= List of places in Jersey =

Parishes of Jersey

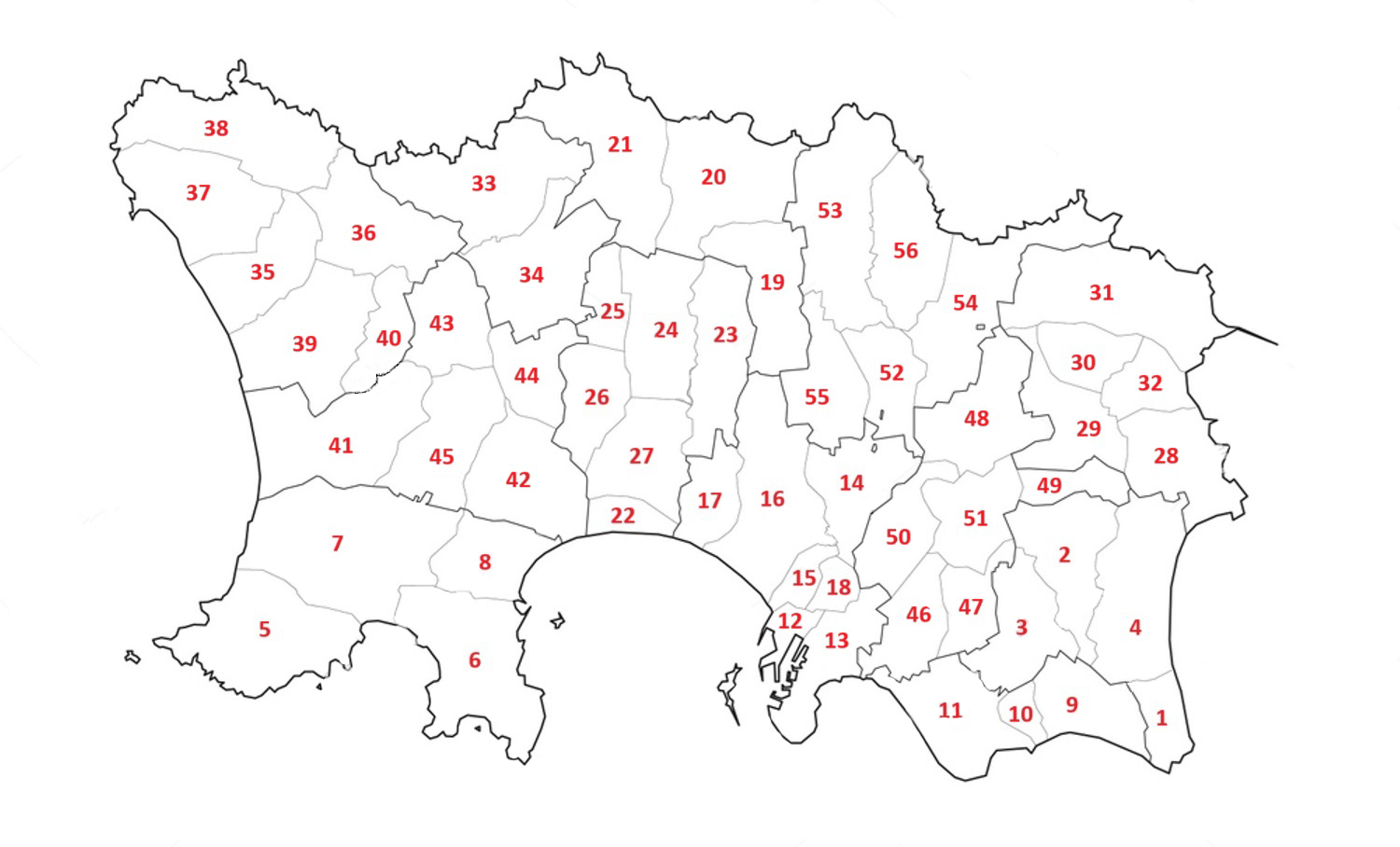
Vingtaines of Jersey

The island of Jersey is located in the Channel Islands and consists of a number of small towns, villages and uninhabited islands. Jersey is divided into twelve administrative parishes which are further subdivided into vingtaines, with Saint Ouen being the exception which uses cueillettes.

Parish	ID - Subdivision
Grouville	4 La Vingtaine des Marais; 2 La Vingtaine de la Rue; 3 La Vingtaine de Longueville; 1 La Vingtaine de la Rocque
Saint Brélade	6 La Vingtaine de Noirmont; 8 La Vingtaine du Coin; 7 La Vingtaine des Quennevais; 5 La Vingtaine de la Moye
Saint Clément	9 La Grande Vingtaine; 11 La Vingtaine du Rocquier; 10 La Vingtaine de Samarès
Saint Helier	12/13 La Vingtaine de la Ville; 18 La Vingtaine du Rouge Bouillon; 14 La Vingtaine de Bas du Mont au Prêtre; 15 La Vingtaine de Haut du Mont au Prêtre; 16 La Vingtaine du Mont à l'Abbé; 17 La Vingtaine du Mont Cochon
Saint John	21 La Vingtaine du Nord; 19 La Vingtaine de Hérupe; 20 La Vingtaine du Douet
Saint Lawrence	La Vingtaine Haut de la Vallée; La Vingtaine Bas de la Vallée; La Vingtaine du Coin Hatain; La Vingtaine du Coin Motier; La Vingtaine du Coin Tourgis Nord; La Vingtaine du Coin Tourgis Sud
Saint Martin	La Vingtaine de Rozel; La Vingtaine de Faldouet; La Vingtaine de la Quéruée; La Vingtaine de l'Église; La Vingtaine du Fief de la Reine
Saint Mary	La Vingtaine du Sud; La Vingtaine du Nord
Saint Ouen	La Petite Cueillette; La Grande Cueillette; La Cueillette de Grantez; La Cueillette de Millais; La Cueillette de Vinchelez; La Cueillette de Léoville
Saint Peter	La Vingtaine du Douet; La Vingtaine de St. Nicolas; La Grande Vingtaine; La Vingtaine des Augerez; La Vingtaine du Coin Varin
Saint Saviour	La Vingtaine de Maufant; La Vingtaine de Sous la Hougue; La Vingtaine des Pigneaux; La Vingtaine de la Grande Longueville; La Vingtaine de la Petite Longueville; La Vingtaine de Sous l'Église
Trinity	La Vingtaine de la Ville-à-l'Évêque; La Vingtaine de Rozel; La Vingtaine du Rondin; La Vingtaine des Augrès; La Vingtaine de la Croiserie

== Places by parish ==
=== Grouville ===
- Minquiers

=== Saint Brélade ===
- Saint Aubin

=== Saint Clément ===
- La Motte

=== Saint Helier ===
- Saint Helier Marina

=== Saint John ===
- Bonne Nuit

=== Saint Martin ===
- Écréhous
- Gorey

=== Saint Mary ===
- Pierres de Lecq
