= Grande Vingtaine =

There are two Grande 'Vingtaines' in Jersey

- Grande Vingtaine (St Clement) in the parish of St Clement
- Grande Vingtaine (St Peter) in the parish of St Peter
