= Vingtaine des Marais =

Vingtaine in Grouville, Jersey

Vingtaine des Marais Marais
- Vingtaine
- Location within Jersey Location within Channel Islands
- Coordinates: 49°11′21″N 2°02′24″W
- Country: Jersey
- Parish: Grouville

Population (January 1, 2021)
  - Total: 3,318
- Time zone: UTC+00:00
- Postal code: JE3–9GA

La Vingtaine des Marais (Jèrriais: Vîngtaine des Mathais) is one of the four vingtaines of the Parish of Grouville in the Channel Island of Jersey.

== See also ==
- Vingtaine de la Rue
- Vingtaine de Longueville
- Vingtaine de la Rocque
