= Vingtaine du Douet =

There are two Vingtaines du Douet in Jersey. They do not have a common border.

- Vingtaine du Douet (St John) in the parish of St John
- Vingtaine du Douet (St Peter) in the parish of St Peter
