= Lists of cities in Europe =

This is a list of lists of cities in Europe. Lists of countries includes countries that fall to at least some extent within European geographical boundaries according to certain definitions.

== Europe ==
- List of European cities by population within city limits

== European Union ==
- List of cities in the European Union by population within city limits
- List of urban areas in the European Union
- List of European Union cities proper by population density

== Sovereign states ==
- List of cities in Albania
- List of cities and towns in Andorra
- List of cities and towns in Armenia
- List of cities and towns in Austria
- List of cities in Azerbaijan
- List of cities and towns in Belarus
- List of cities in Belgium
- List of cities in Bosnia and Herzegovina
- List of cities and towns in Bulgaria
- List of cities in Croatia
- List of cities, towns and villages in Cyprus
- List of cities and towns in the Czech Republic
- List of cities in Denmark
- List of cities and towns in Estonia
- List of cities and towns in Finland
- List of communes in France
- List of cities in Georgia
- List of cities and towns in Germany
- List of cities in Greece
- List of cities and towns in Hungary
- List of cities and towns in Iceland
- List of cities in Ireland
- List of cities in Italy
- List of cities in Kazakhstan
- List of cities and towns in Latvia
- List of municipalities in Liechtenstein
- List of cities in Lithuania
- List of towns in Luxembourg
- List of cities in Malta (historical only)
- List of cities and towns in Moldova
- Monaco (city-state)
- List of cities in Montenegro
- List of cities in the Netherlands
- List of cities in North Macedonia
- List of towns and cities in Norway
- List of cities and towns in Poland
- List of cities in Portugal
- List of cities and towns in Romania
- List of cities and towns in Russia
- List of municipalities of San Marino
- List of cities and towns in Serbia
- List of cities and towns in Slovakia
- List of cities and towns in Slovenia
- List of municipalities of Spain
- List of cities in Sweden
- List of cities in Switzerland
- List of cities in Turkey
- List of cities in Ukraine
- List of cities in the United Kingdom
- Vatican City (city-state)

== Dependencies, autonomies, other territories ==
- Gibraltar (city territory)
- List of towns in Guernsey
- List of places in Jersey
- List of cities and towns in Kosovo
- List of places in the Isle of Man
- Towns of the Faroe Islands

== See also ==
- Lists of cities
- Lists of cities by country
- List of villages in Europe by country
