= Vingtaine du Nord (St John) =

Vingtaine in Saint John, Jersey

Vingtaine du Nord Nord
- Vingtaine
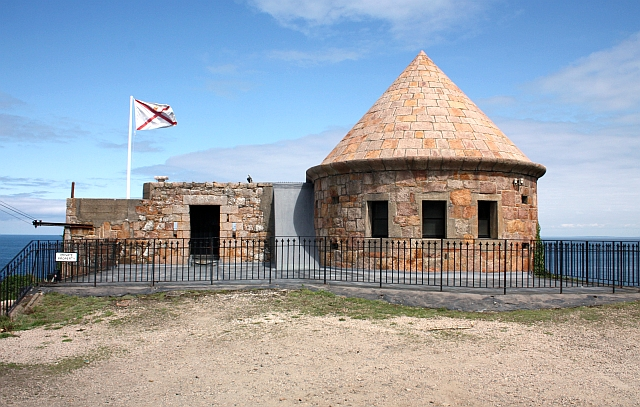
- La Crete Fort

- Location within Jersey Location within Channel Islands
- Coordinates: 49°14′39″N 2°07′28″W
- Country: Jersey
- Parish: Saint John

Population (January 1, 2021)
  - Total: 1,421
- Time zone: UTC+00:00
- Postal code: JE4–8PA

La Vingtaine du Nord is one of the three vingtaines of the Parish of St John in Jersey, Channel Islands. It contains the second highest point in Jersey at Mont Mado (473 ft).

The Vingtaine du Nord, Vingtaine de Hérupe and Vingtaine du Douet all form a single electoral district of St John.

== Places in the vingtaine ==
- Bonne Nuit
- Frémont Point Transmitter
- La Crête Fort
- Wolf's Caves
- Le Mont Mado
