= Vingtaine du Coin =

Vingtaine in Saint Brélade, Jersey

Vingtaine du Coin Coin
- Vingtaine
- Location within Jersey Location within Channel Islands
- Coordinates: 49°11′36″N 2°10′26″W
- Country: Jersey
- Parish: Saint Brelade

Population (January 1, 2021)
  - Total: 988
- Time zone: UTC+00:00
- Postal code: JE3–8BS

Vingtaine du Coin is one of the four vingtaines of St. Brélade Parish on the Channel Island of Jersey.

Together with Vingtaine de Noirmont, it forms "St.Brélade No. 1 district" and elects one Deputy.
