= Vingtaine des Quennevais =

Vingtaine in Saint Brélade, Jersey

Vingtaine des Quennevais Quennevais
- Vingtaine
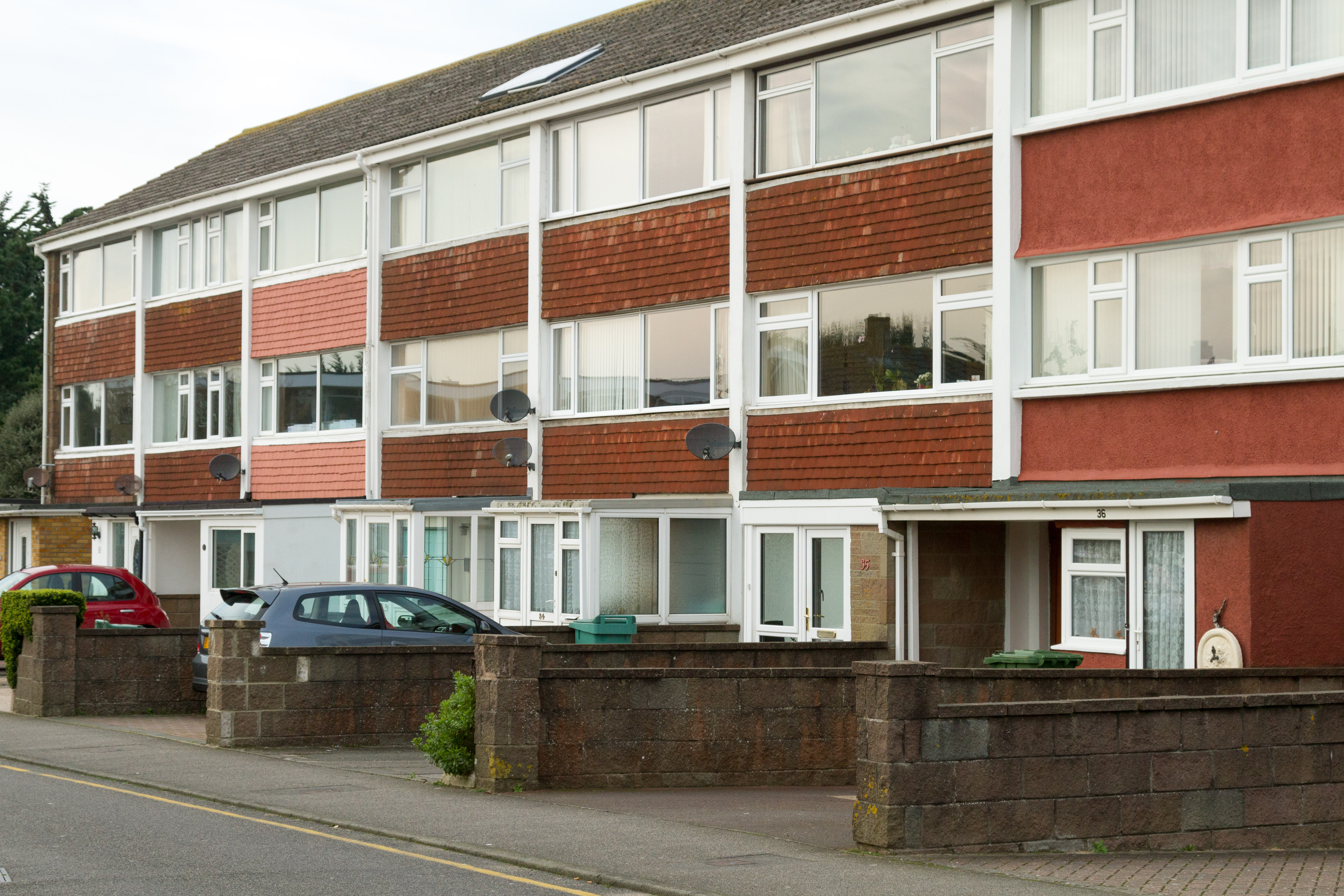
- Housing in the vingtaine

- Location within Jersey Location within Channel Islands
- Coordinates: 49°11′40″N 2°12′16″W
- Country: Jersey
- Parish: Saint Brelade

Population (January 1, 2021)
  - Total: 5,358
- Time zone: UTC+00:00
- Postal code: JE3–8BS

Vingtaine des Quennevais (Jèrriais: "La Vîngtaine des Tchennevais") is the largest of the four vingtaines of the Parish of St. Brélade in Jersey in the Channel Islands.

Together with the Vingtaine de la Moye it forms part of "St. Brélade No. 2" electoral district which used to elect two deputies. Since the 2022 election at which the reforms of 2021 to the constitution of the States were give effect St. Brélade No. 2 is simply a district for which there is a separate electoral register prepared and where there is a returning officer appointed for the conduct of the poll, but the Deputies for St Brelade are now elected on a whole-Parish basis.

Some land, ancillary buildings and structures for Jersey Airport are situate in the Vingtaine..

7 "Officiers du Connétable" (Constable's Officers) are elected by the Parish Assembly to serve in respect of the Vingtaine.

The South Telephone Exchange in Jersey is located in the Vingtaine on La Route Orange.

== Sport ==
Les Quennevais Rugby Football Club is named after the vingtaine.

This vingtaine also contains Les Quennevais Sports Centre, which has the only other public swimming pool in Jersey apart from Aquasplash in St Helier.
