= Vingtaine de Noirmont =

Vingtaine in Saint Brélade, Jersey

Vingtaine de Noirmont Noirmont
- Vingtaine
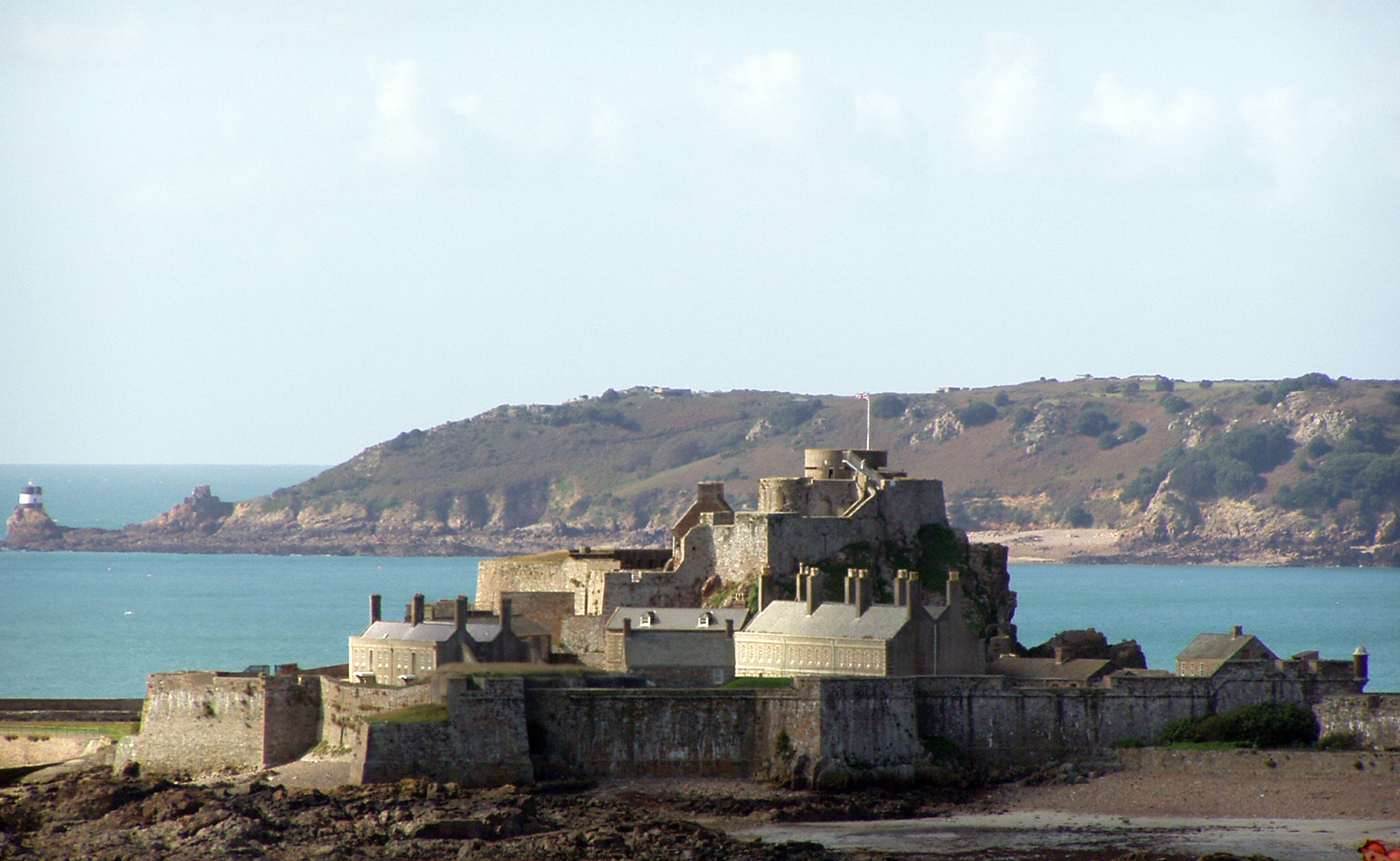
- Noirmont Point can be seen in the background behind Elizabeth Castle

- Location within Jersey Location within Channel Islands
- Coordinates: 49°10′40″N 2°10′46″W
- Country: Jersey
- Parish: Saint Brelade

Population (January 1, 2021)
  - Total: 2,505
- Time zone: UTC+00:00
- Postal code: JE3–8BS

Vingtaine de Noirmont is one of the four vingtaines of St. Brélade Parish on the Channel Island of Jersey.

Together with Vingtaine du Coin, it forms "St.Brélade No. 1 district" and elects one Deputy.
