= Vingtaine de la Ville =

Vingtaine in Saint Helier, Jersey

Vingtaine de la Ville la Ville
- Vingtaine
- Location within Jersey Location within Channel Islands
- Coordinates: 49°10′44″N 2°06′20″W
- Country: Jersey
- Parish: Saint Helier

Population (January 1, 2021)
  - Total: 11,181
- Time zone: UTC+00:00
- Postal code: JE4–8PA

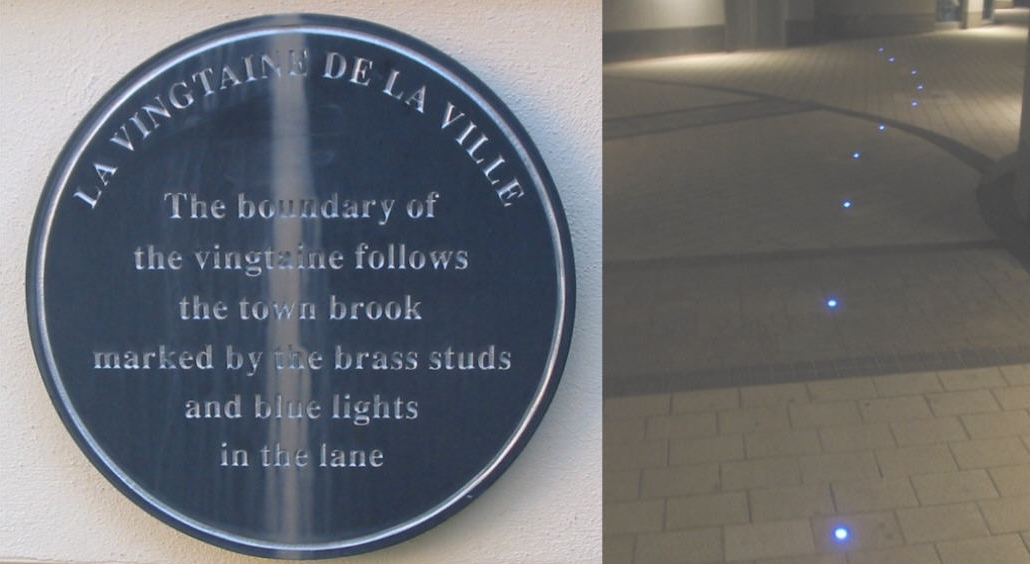
A 2005 residential and commercial development in St. Helier incorporates a plaque and light installation marking the boundary of La Vingtaine de la Ville

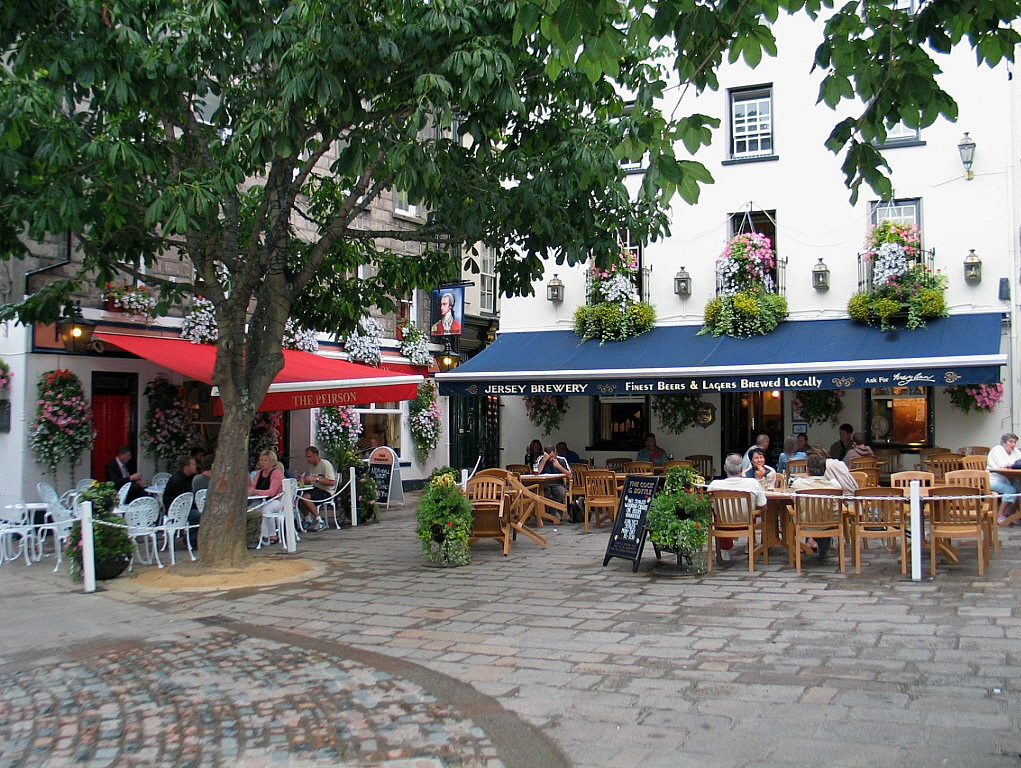
The Historic Town Centre of St Helier is in the vigntaine

The Vingtaine de la Ville is one of the six vingtaines of Saint Helier in Jersey, and roughly corresponds to the historic town centre and harbours. It is divided into two cantons:

- Canton de Bas de la Vingtaine de la Ville
- Canton de Haut de la Vingtaine de la Ville

The Vingtaine de la Ville maintains an autonomous financial existence, unlike other vingtaines in Jersey, thanks to an endowment which has its origins in the purchase of Le Mont de la Ville by the British government in 1804. Formerly, Le Mont de la Ville, a craggy plateau overlooking the town of St. Helier, was topped by open common land used for grazing and rabbit hunting. In 1785 part of the plateau was levelled as a parade ground, which led to the discovery of a dolmen which the vingtaine presented to the Governor of Jersey, General Henry Seymour Conway (later Field Marshal), who subsequently transported it to his estate at Henley-on-Thames where it was re-erected. As it is now a listed monument in the United Kingdom, attempts to have it returned to Jersey have been to no avail. The continuing Napoleonic threat persuaded the British government to fortify the hill and Fort Regent was constructed. The proceeds from the sale established the original fund that lay at the foundation of the finances managed by the vingtaine's two elected procureurs today.

Until 1831, many bodies and individuals in Jersey issued their own banknotes. The parishes of Jersey issued notes, as did the Vingtaine de la Ville. Legislation in 1831 attempted to regulate such issues, but the parishes and the Vingtaine de la Ville were exempted from the regulatory provisions. Gradually, administrative and financial functions carried out by the vingtaine were taken over by the parish and by the States of Jersey.

== Elections ==
For electoral purposes, St. Helier is divided into three districts. The Vingtaine de la Ville forms District St Helier South and elects 4 Deputies to the States of Jersey.

== Heritage ==
Despite the effects of inflation and the passage of time, the funds available to the vingtaine are still sufficient to enable small-scale heritage projects to be undertaken.

The vingtaine has its own website here, which contains sites of historical interest, maps, and details of plaques.

In all there are over 50 plaques and features in the Vingtaine that have been erected to commemorate people and/or events that have a special place in the history of the Island or the Vingtaine.

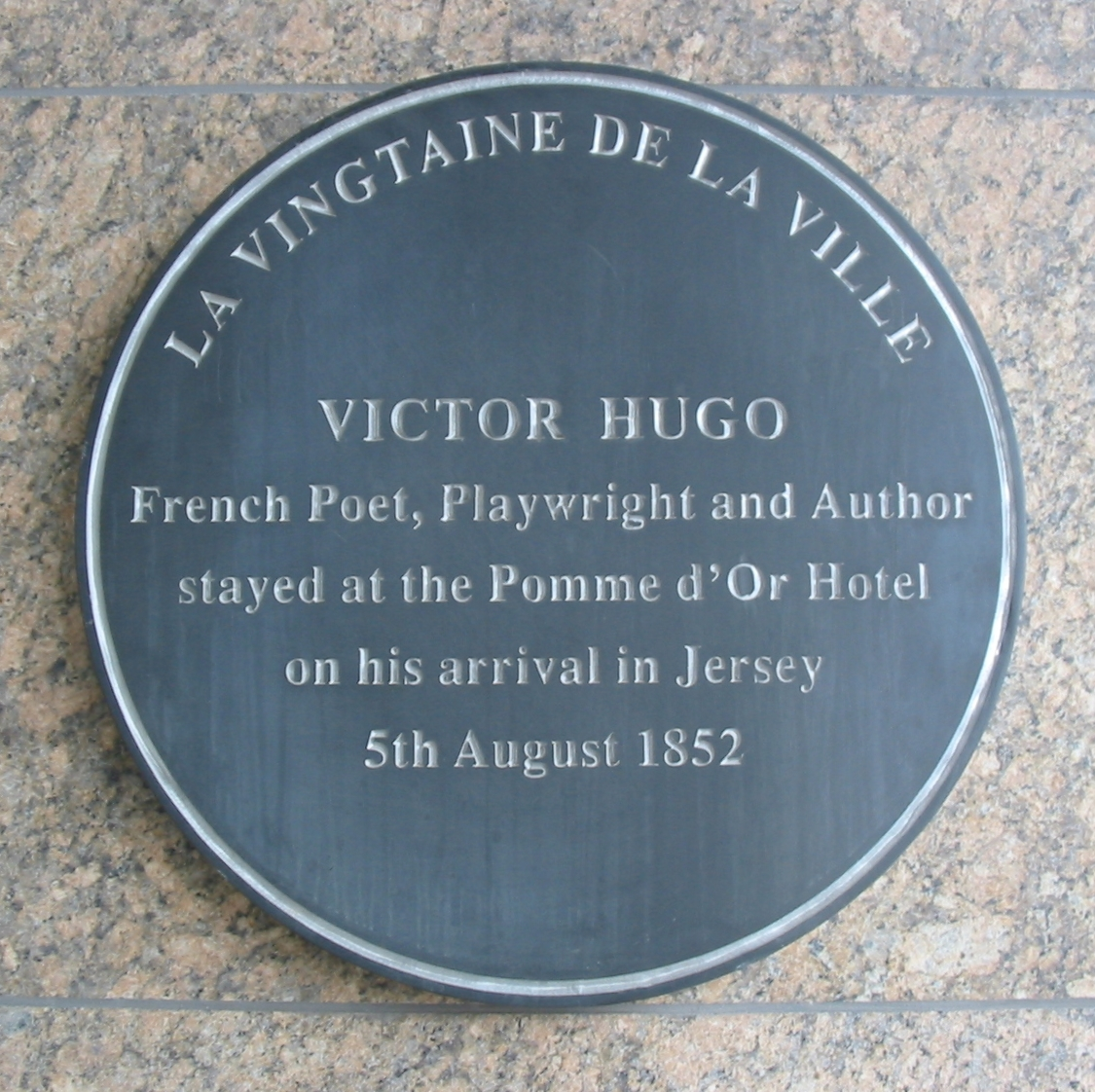
Victor Hugo

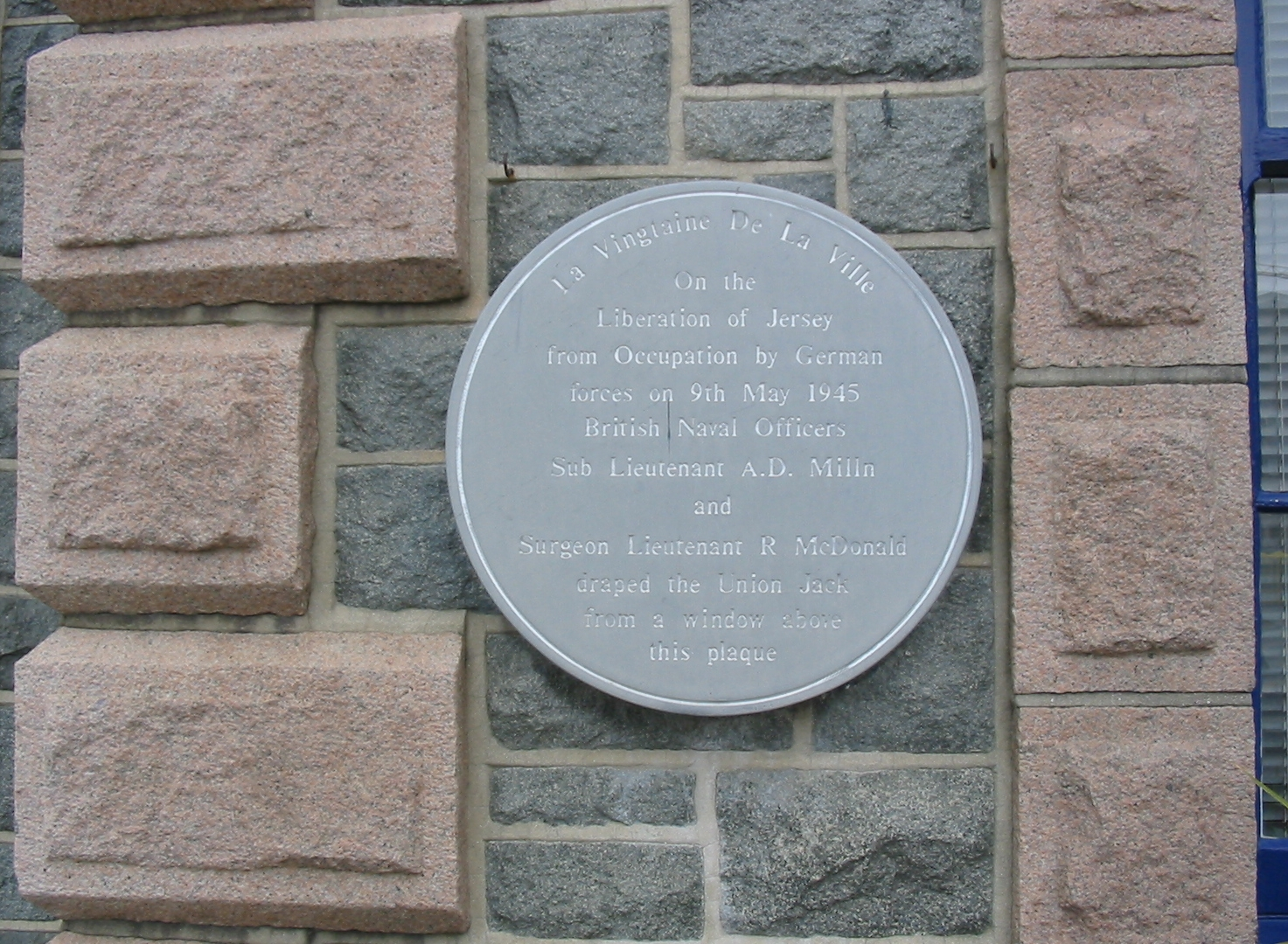
Liberation

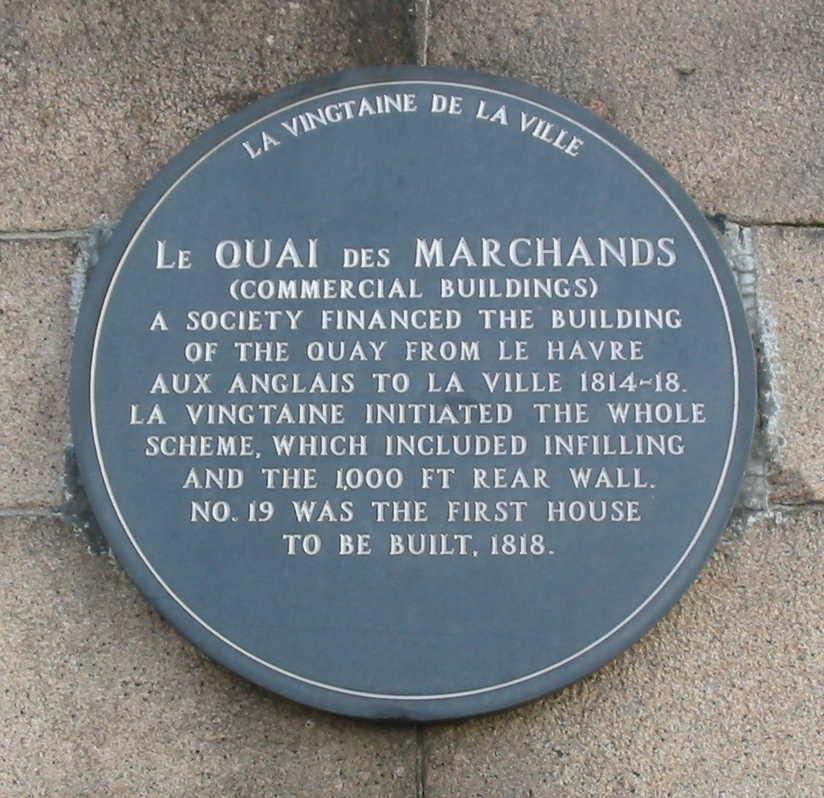
Quai des Marchands

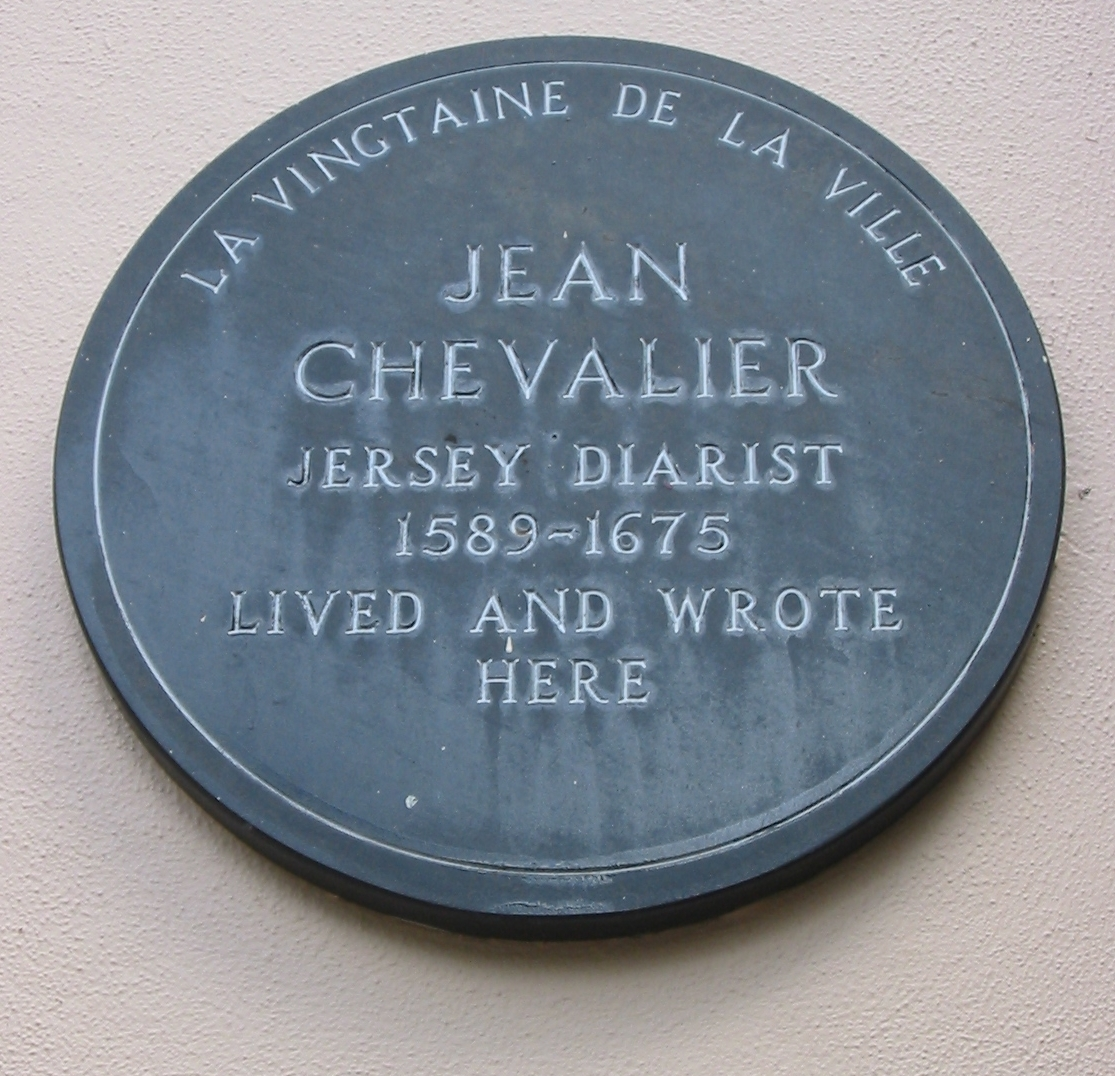
Jean Chevalier

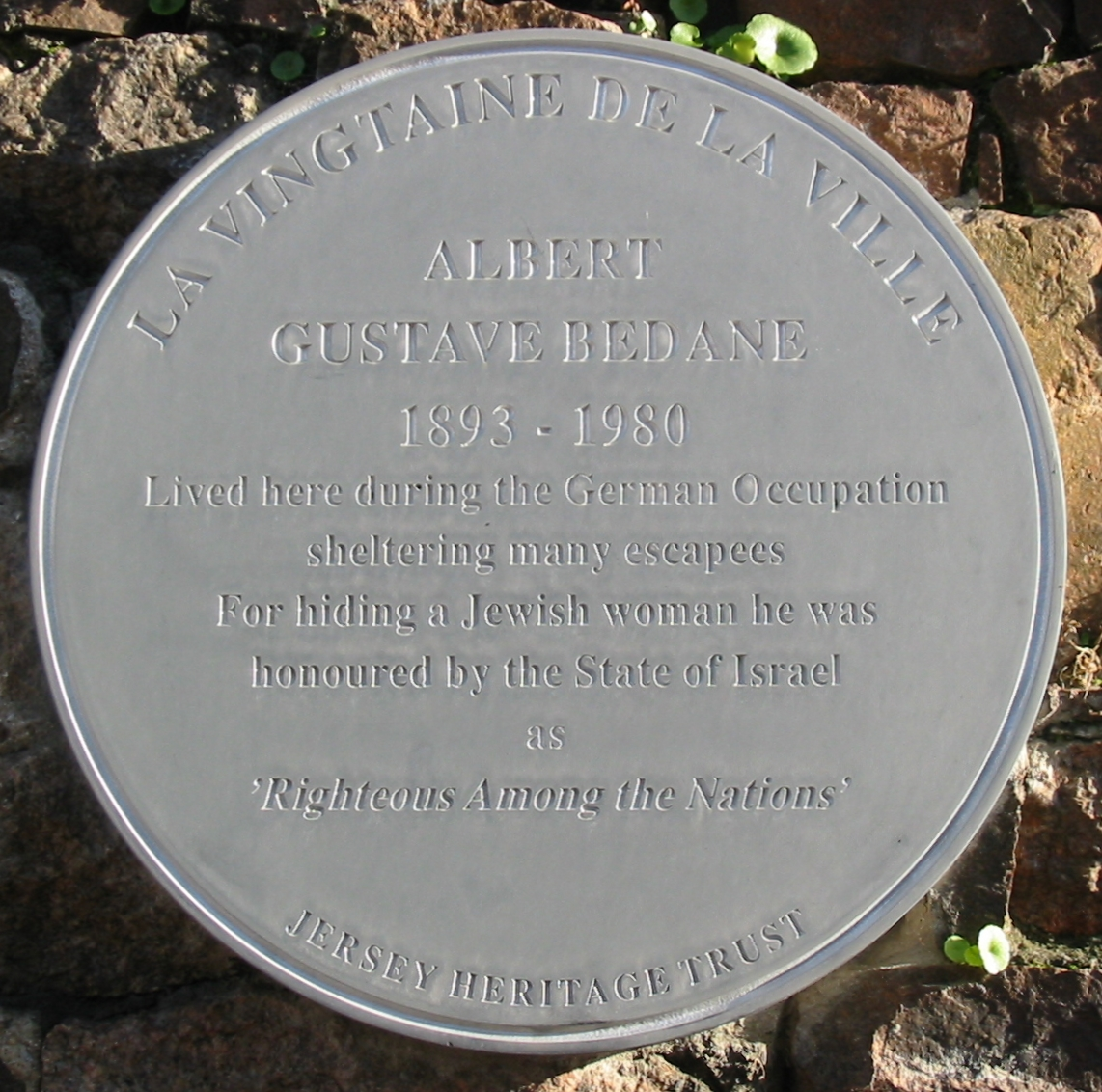
Albert Bedane

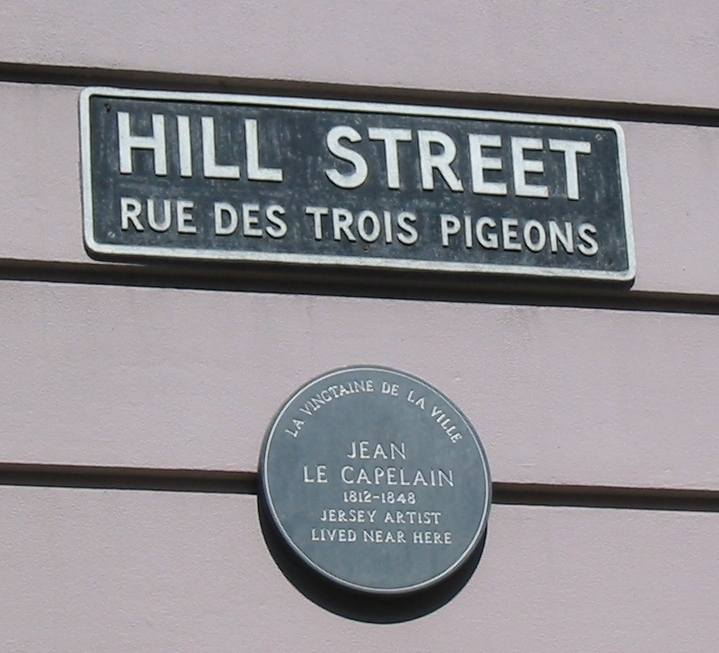
Jean Le Capelain

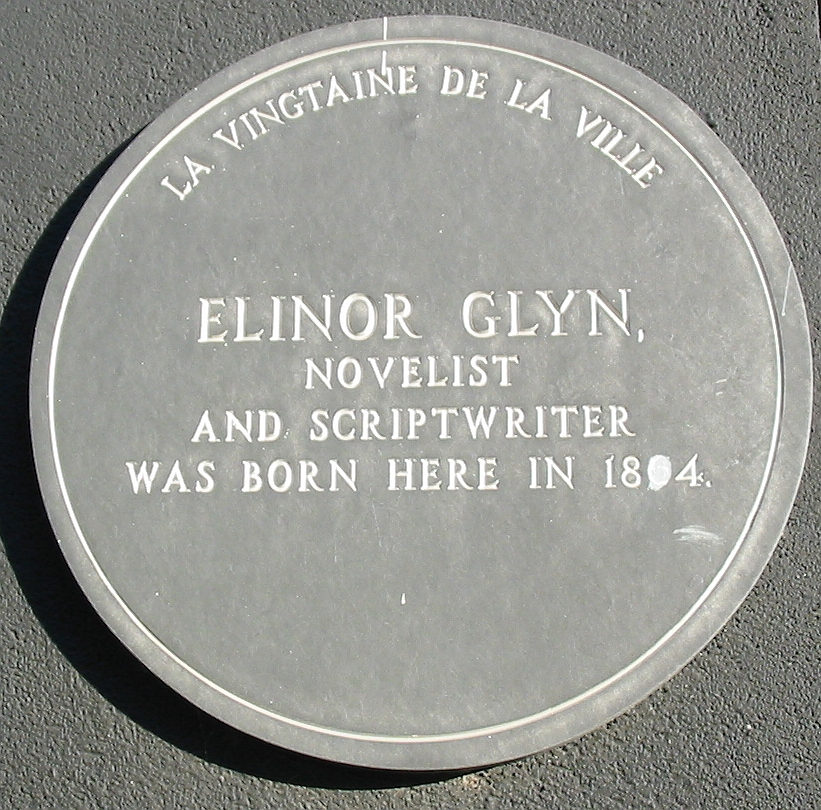
Elinor Glyn

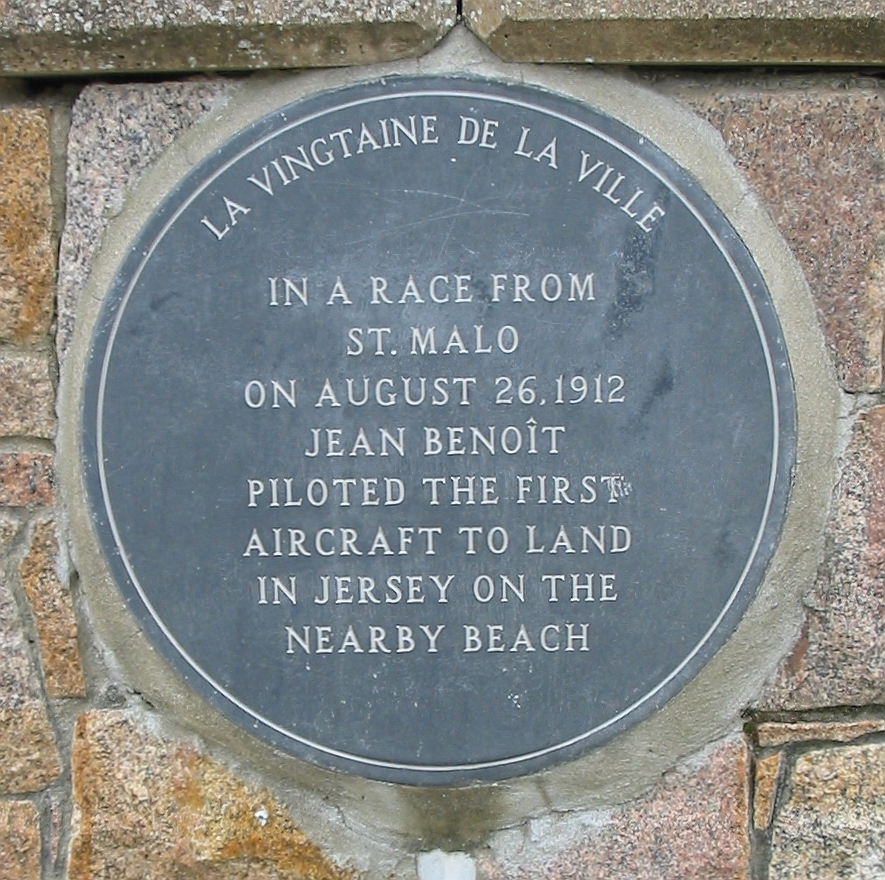
First aircraft in Jersey

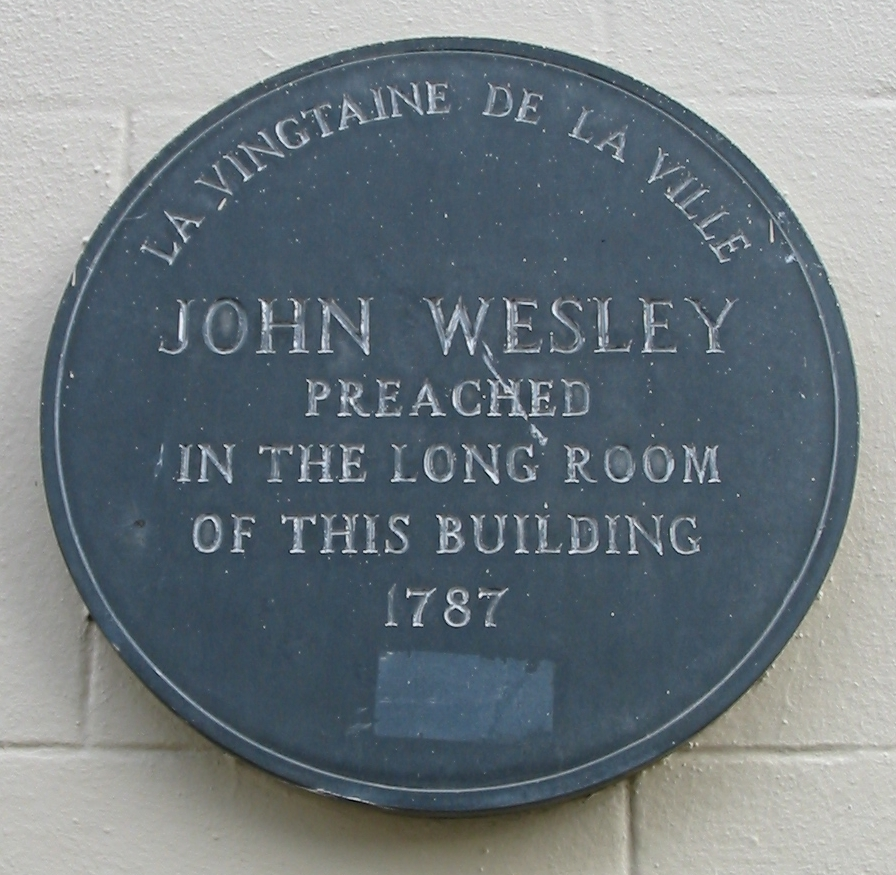
John Wesley

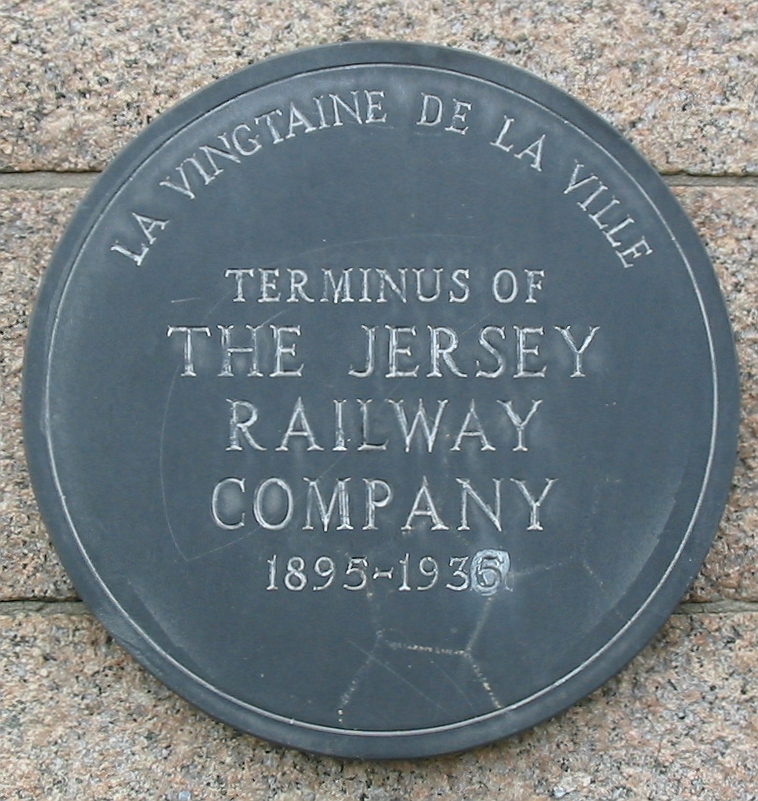
Jersey Railway

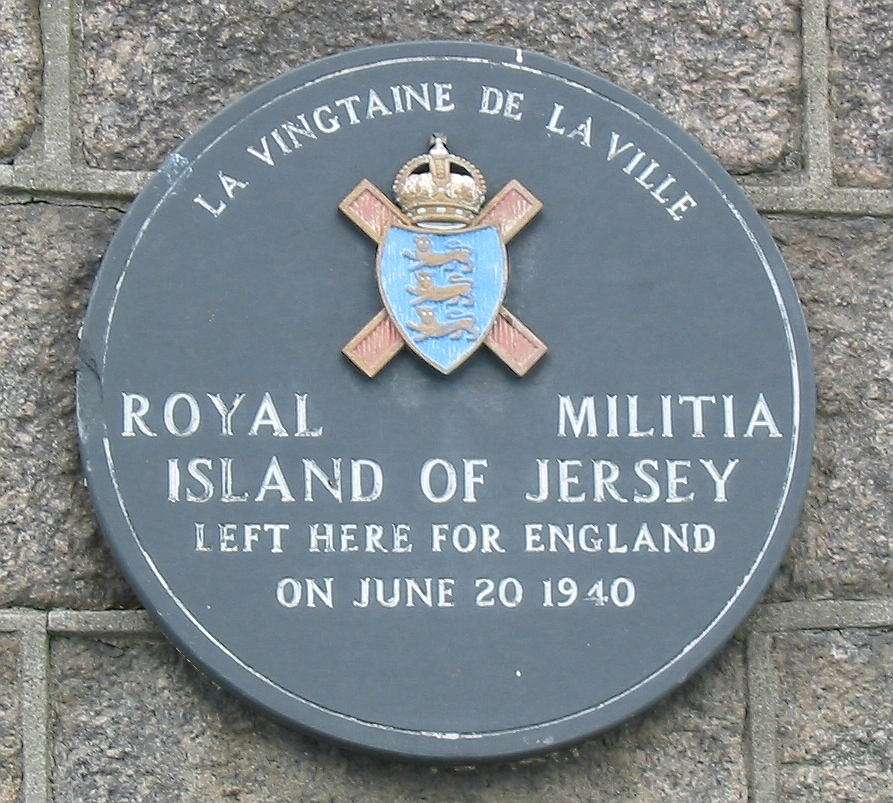
Royal Militia Island of Jersey

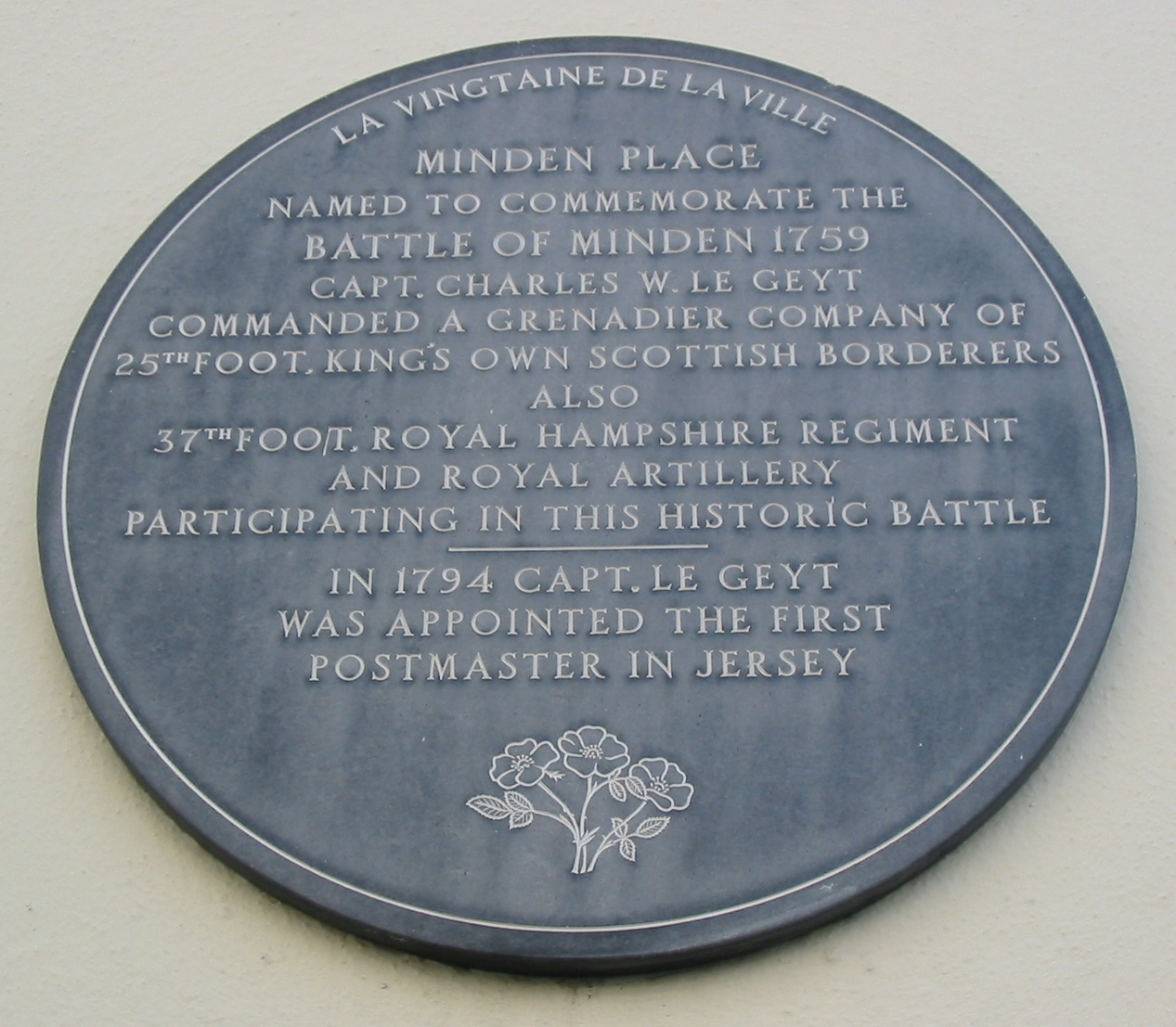
Charles Le Geyt and the Battle of Minden

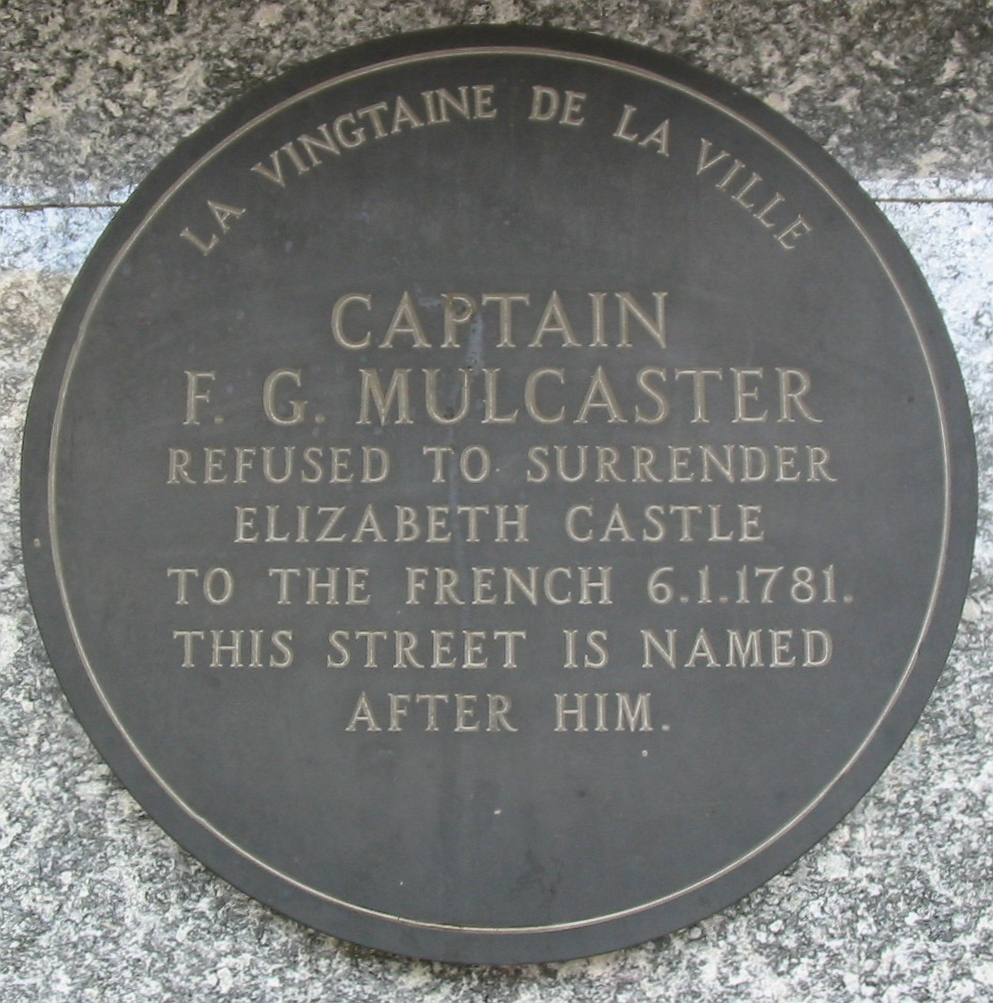
Captain Mulcaster

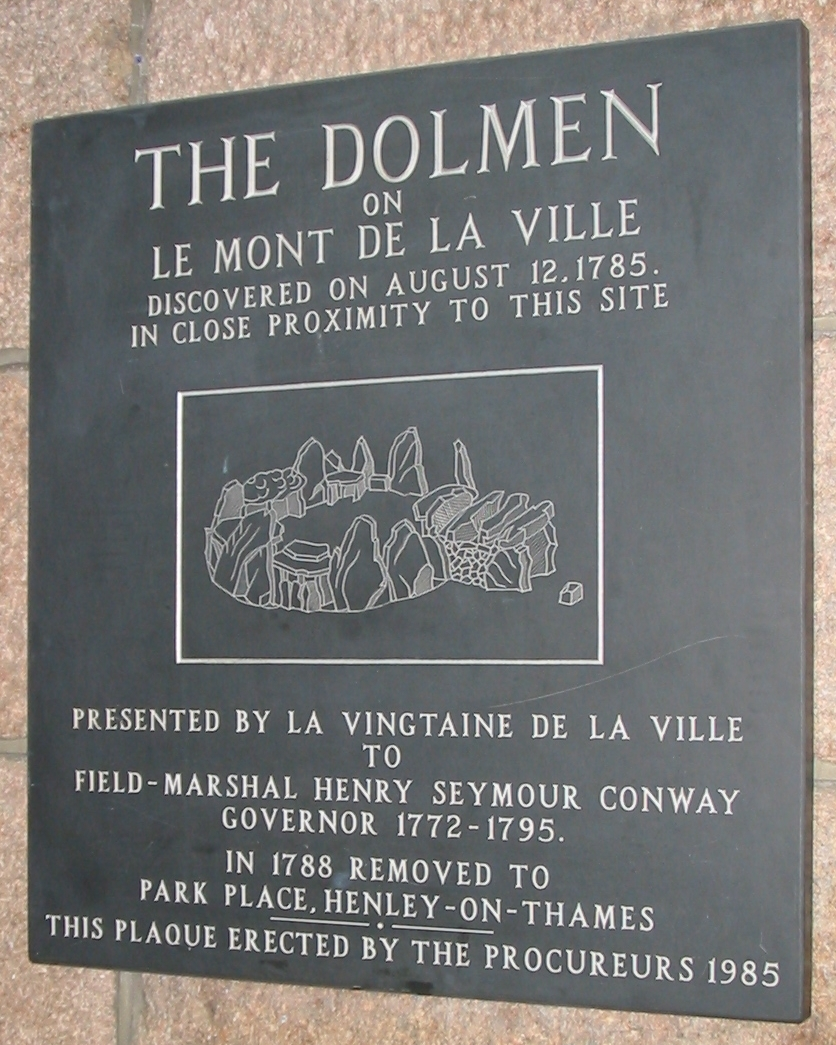

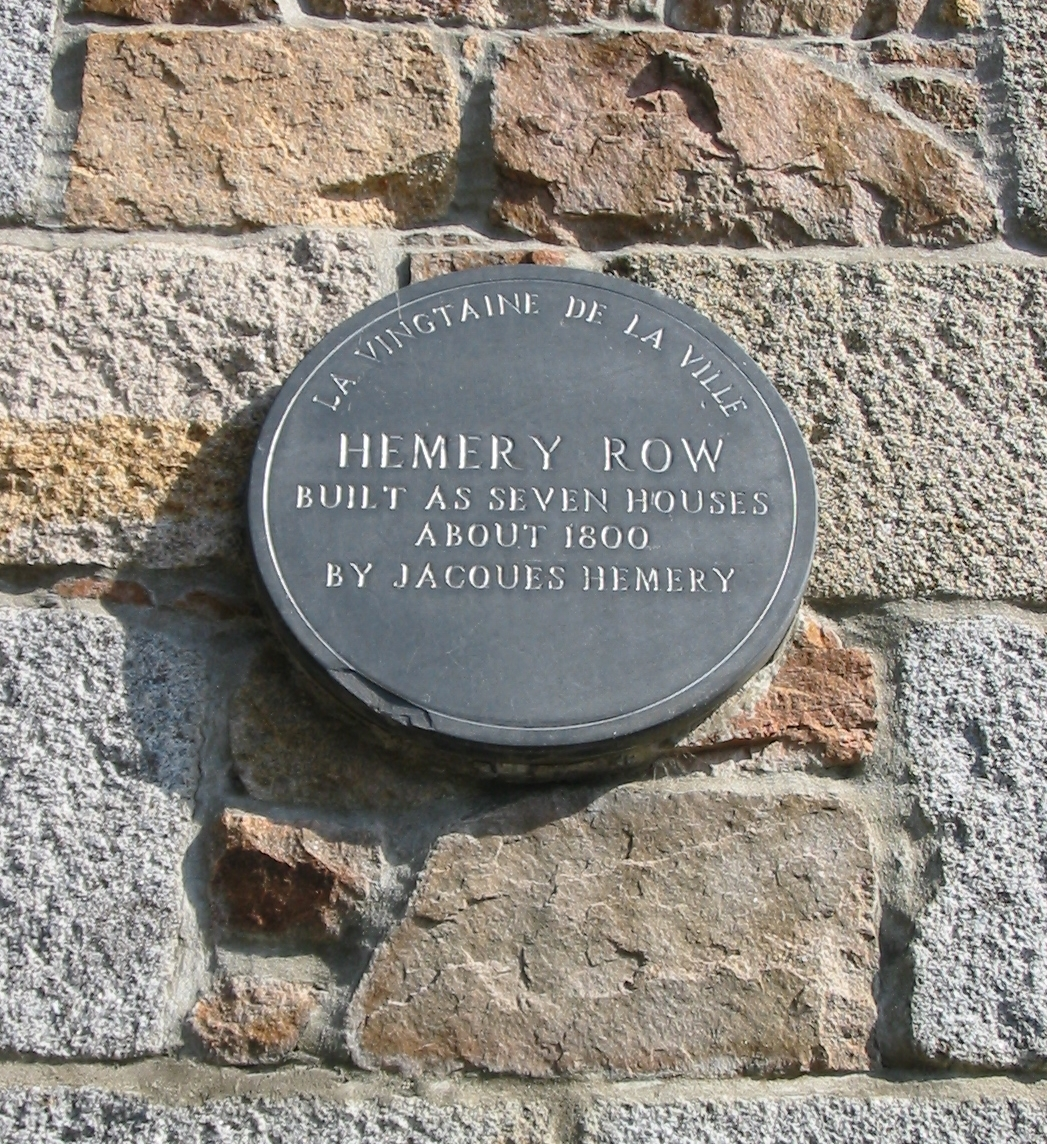
Hemery Row

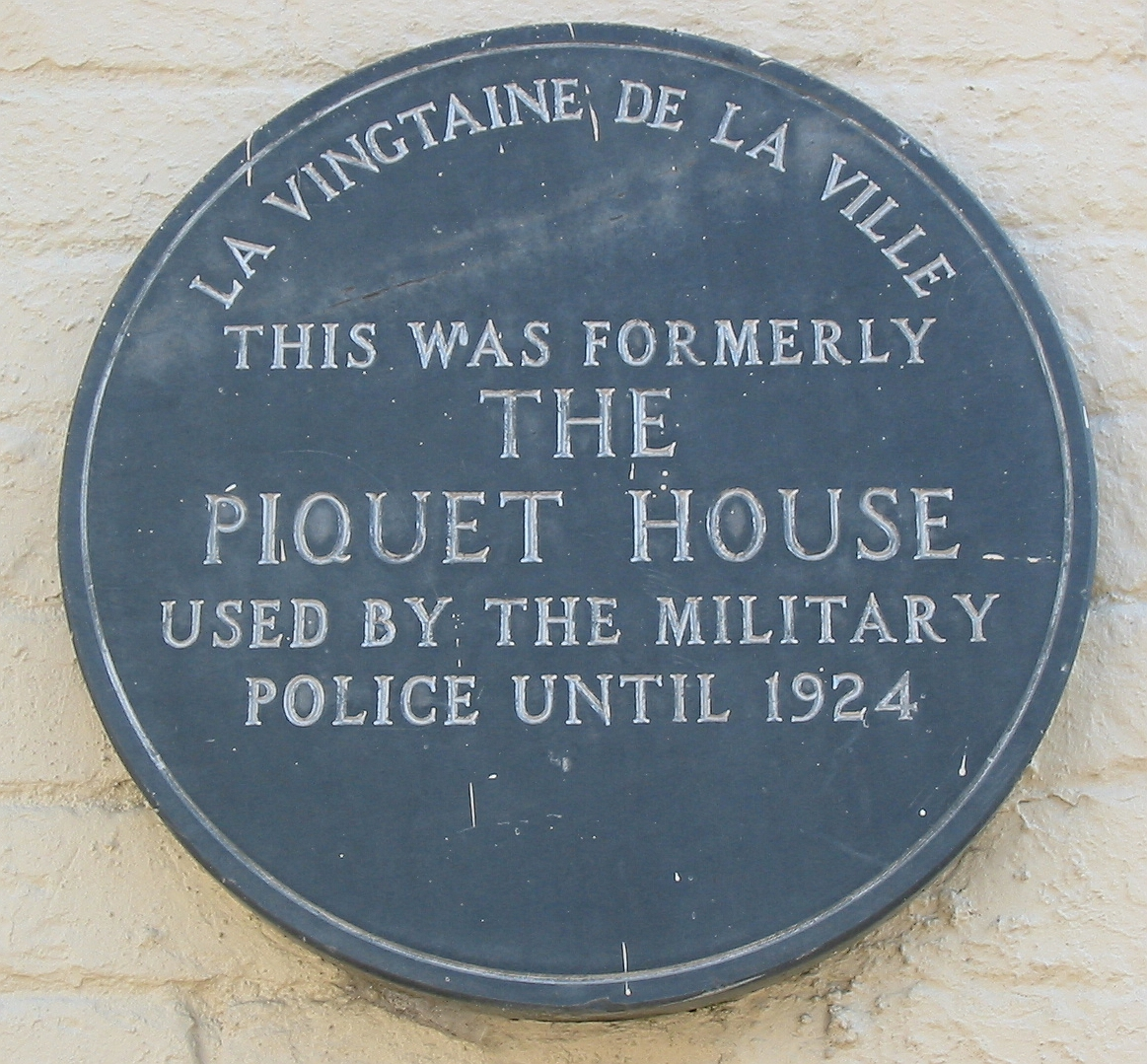
Piquet House

== See also ==
- King Street, Saint Helier
- La Collette Power Station
- Parish Church of St Helier
- Saint Helier Marina
- Jersey Opera House
