= Grande Vingtaine (St Clement) =

la Grande Vingtaine
- Vingtaine
- Location within Jersey Location within Channel Islands
- Coordinates: 49°10′25″N 2°03′22″W
- Country: Jersey
- Parish: Saint Clement

Population (January 1, 2021)
  - Total: 2,292
- Time zone: UTC+00:00
- Postal code: JE2–6FP

La Grande Vingtaine is one of the three vingtaines of St. Clement in the Channel Island of Jersey. It lies to the east of La Vingtaine du Rocquier, and spans the area between Le Hocq and the parish's border with Grouville.

It shares its name with La Grande Vingtaine in St Peter.

== See also ==
- Vingtaine de Samarès
