= Vingtaine de Samarès =

Vingtaine in St. Clement, Jersey

Vingtaine de Samares Samares
- Vingtaine
- Location within Jersey Location within Channel Islands
- Coordinates: 49°10′26″N 2°04′37″W
- Country: Jersey
- Parish: Saint Clement

Population (January 1, 2021)
  - Total: 6,875
- Time zone: UTC+00:00
- Postal code: JE2–6FP

Vingtaine de Samarès is one of the three vingtaines of the Parish of St. Clement in Jersey, Channel Islands.

It takes its name from the salt marsh that used to occupy much of the area of this low-lying coastal vingtaine.

Samarès used to be served by the Jersey Eastern Railway. The local train station was opened on 7 August 1873, and closed on 21 June 1929. The station building still exists, and is now a private house.

== Places in the vingtaine ==
- Samarès Manor
- Samarès primary school
- Mont Ubé and its dolmen
- La Grève d'Azette, a sandy beach which spans from Le Dicq to La Motte
- FB Playing Fields, sports pitches and facilities
- Rocque Berg, the Witches' Rock connected with beliefs of witchcraft
- La Motte, a tidal island and prehistoric site
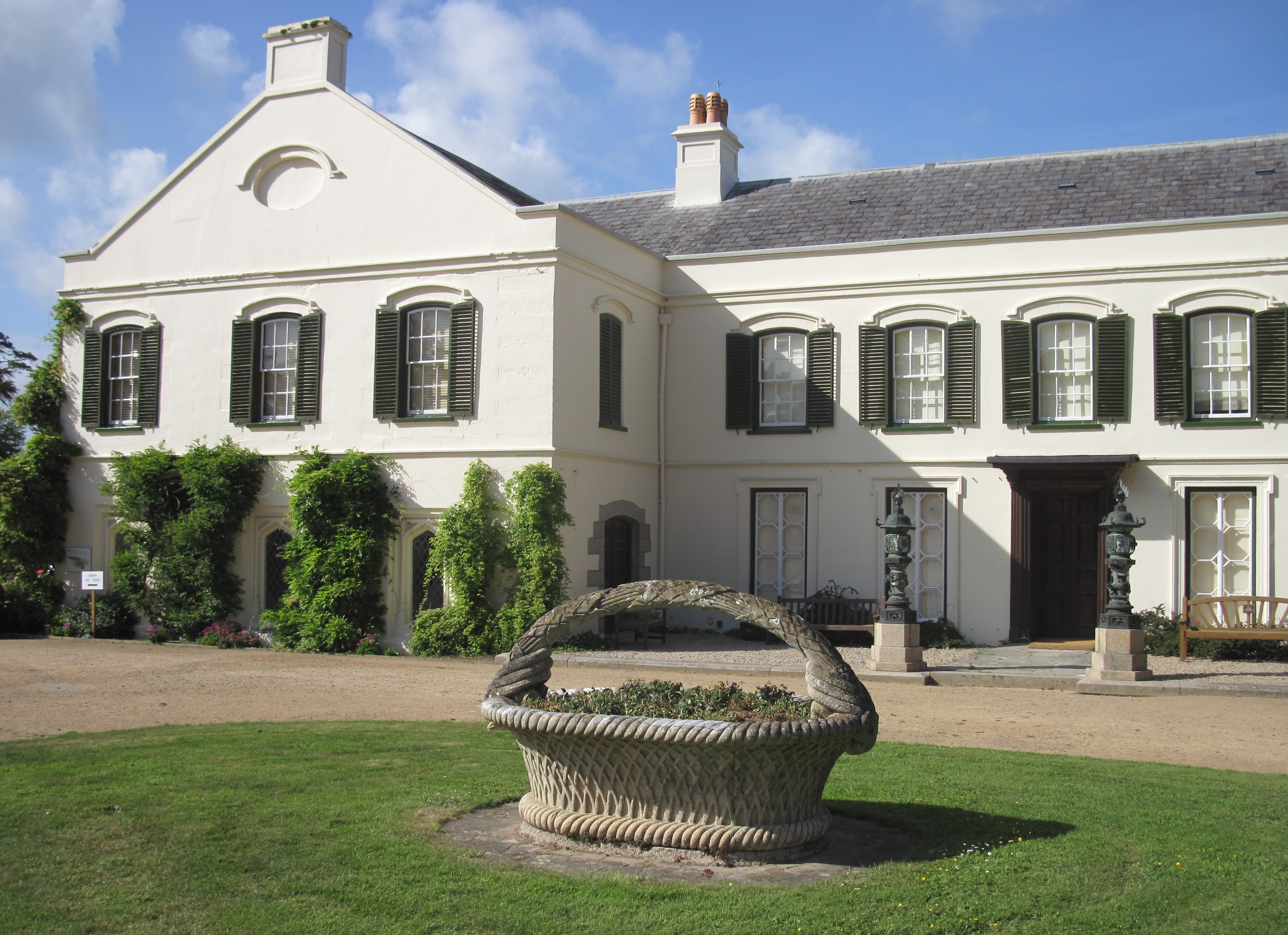
Samarès Manor in 2011

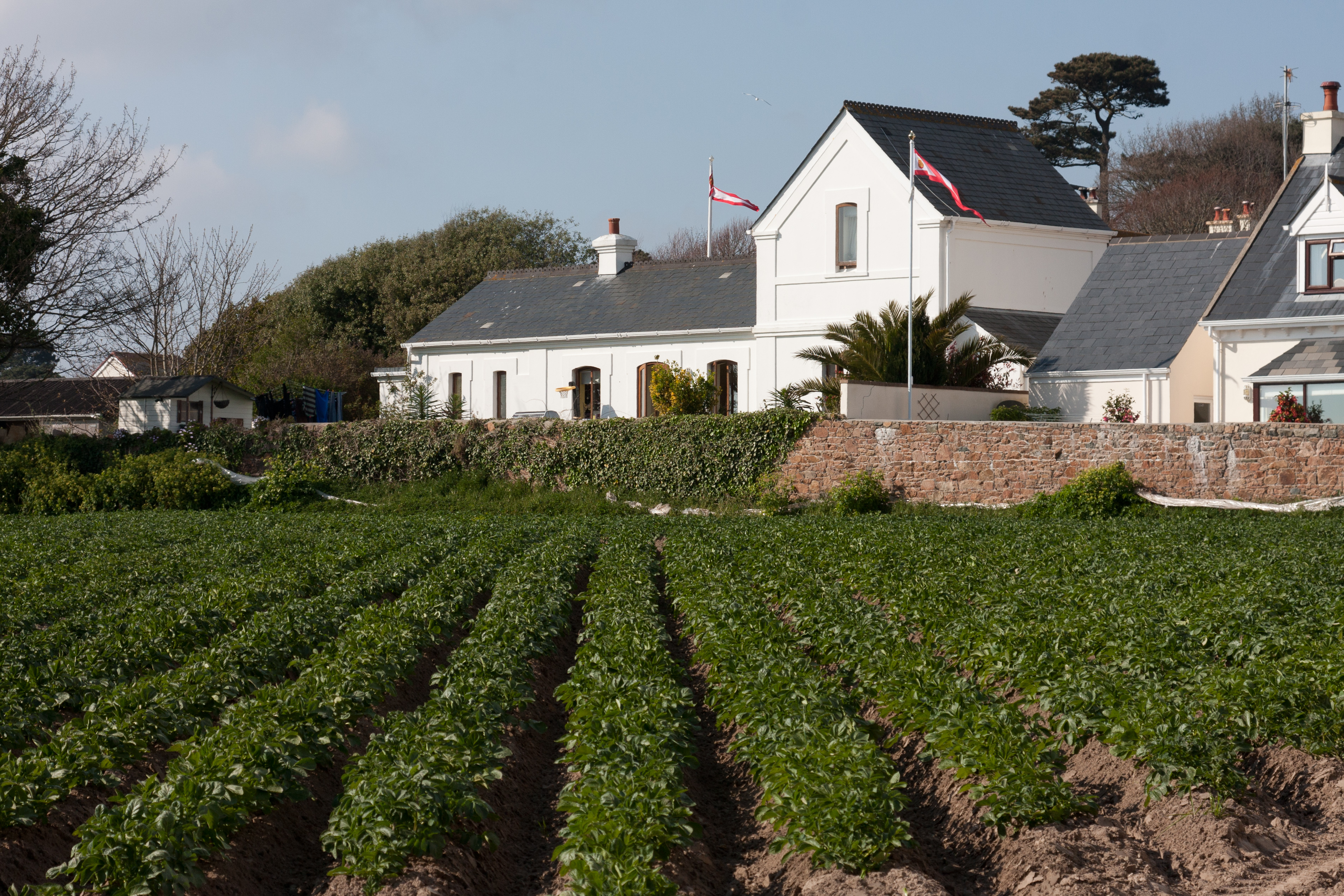
The former train station

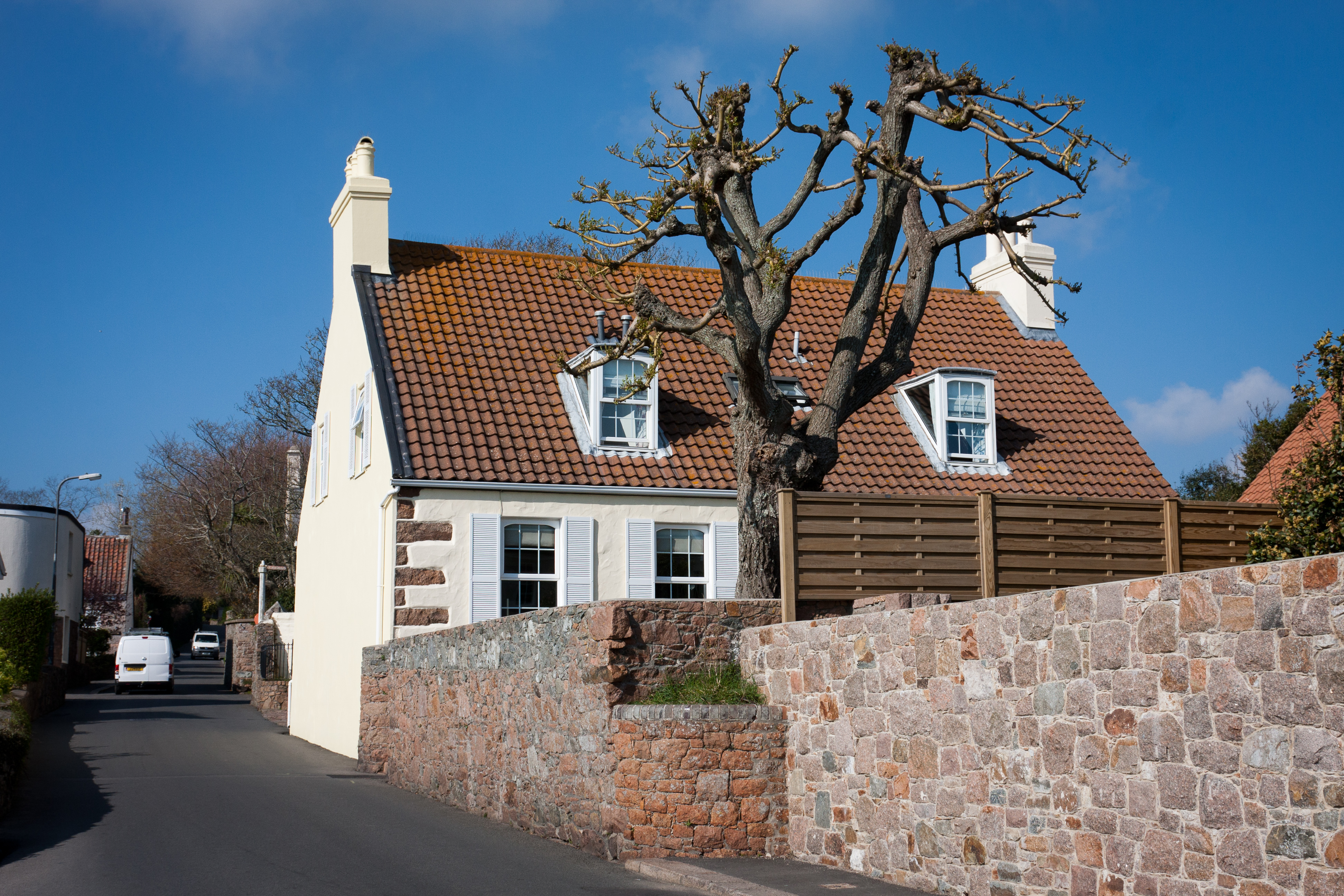
A house on Rue de Samarès

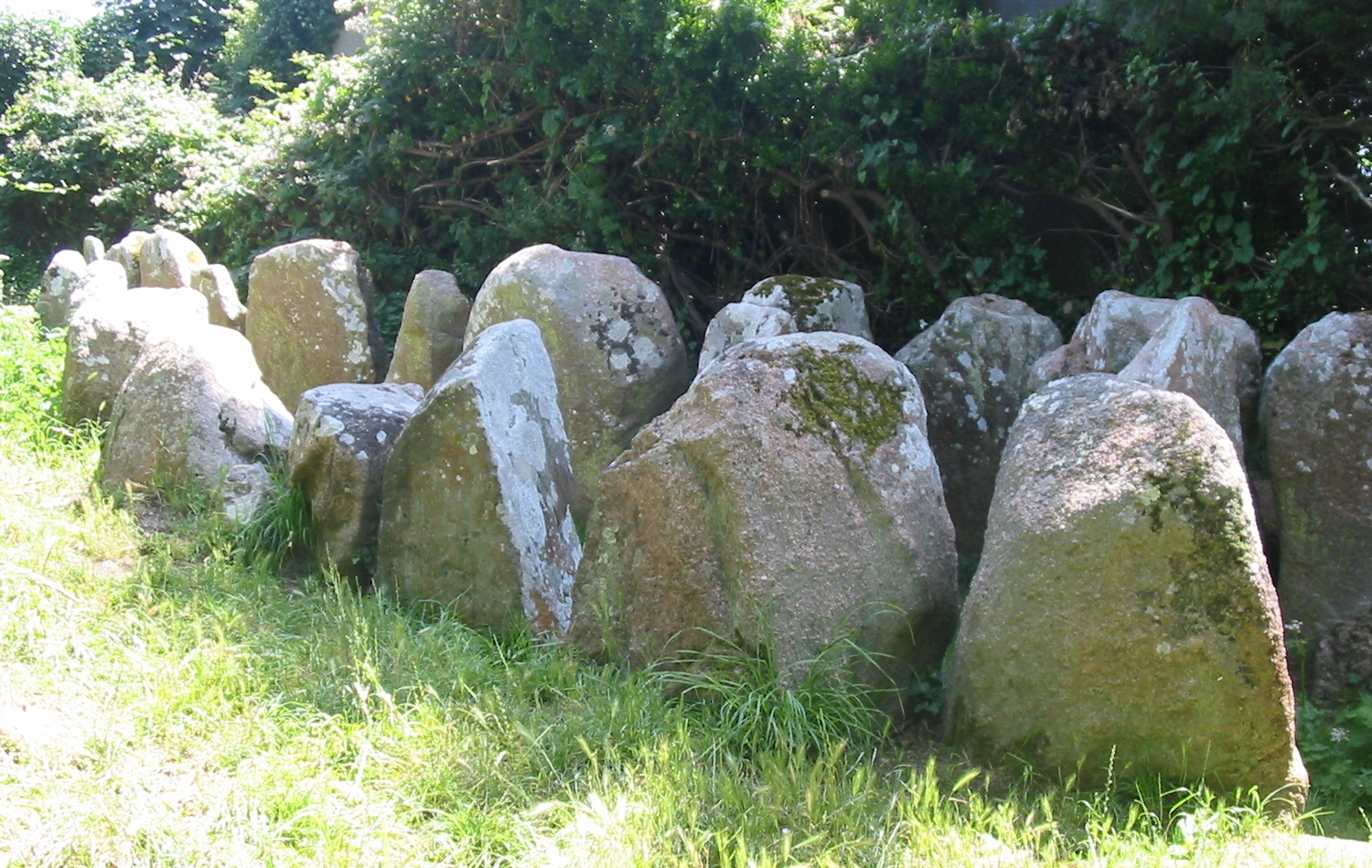
The dolmen at Mont Ubé

== See also ==
- Vingtaine du Rocquier
- Grande Vingtaine
