= Vingtaine de la Ville-à-l'Évêque =

Vingtaine in Trinity, Jersey

Vingtaine de la Ville-à-l'Évêque is one of the five vingtaines of Trinity in the Channel Island of Jersey.

== Places in the vingtaine ==
- Les Platons
