= Vingtaine du Coin Motier =

Vingtaine in Saint Lawrence, Jersey

Vingtaine du Coin Motier is one of the six vingtaines of St Lawrence Parish on the Channel Island of Jersey.
