= Vingtaine du Coin Tourgis Sud =

Vingtaine in Saint Lawrence, Jersey

Vingtaine du Coin Tourgis Sud is one of the six vingtaines of St Lawrence Parish in the Channel Island of Jersey.

== History ==
The Tourgis family owned the Fief des Arbres in 1292.

== See also ==
- Vingtaine du Coin Tourgis Nord
