= Vingtaine de St. Nicolas =

Vingtaine in St. Peter, Jersey

Vingtaine de St. Nicolas is one of the five vingtaines of St Peter Parish on the Channel Island of Jersey.
