= Vingtaine de la Rue =

Vingtaine in Grouville, Jersey

Vingtaine de la Rue la Rue
- Vingtaine
- Location within Jersey Location within Channel Islands
- Coordinates: 49°11′26″N 2°03′22″W
- Country: Jersey
- Parish: Grouville

Population (January 1, 2021)
  - Total: 441
- Time zone: UTC+00:00
- Postal code: JE3–9GA

Vingtaine de la Rue is one of the four vingtaines of Grouville Parish on the Channel Island of Jersey.
