= Vingtaine Haut de la Vallée =

Vingtaine in St. Lawrence, Jersey

Vingtaine Haut de la Vallée is one of the six vingtaines of St Lawrence Parish on the Channel Island of Jersey.
