= Vingtaine du Coin Varin =

Vingtaine in Saint Peter, Jersey

Vingtaine du Coin Varin is one of the five vingtaines of St Peter Parish on the Channel Island of Jersey.
