= Vingtaine du Douet (St John) =

Vingtaine in Saint John, Jersey

Vingtaine du Douet Douet
- Vingtaine
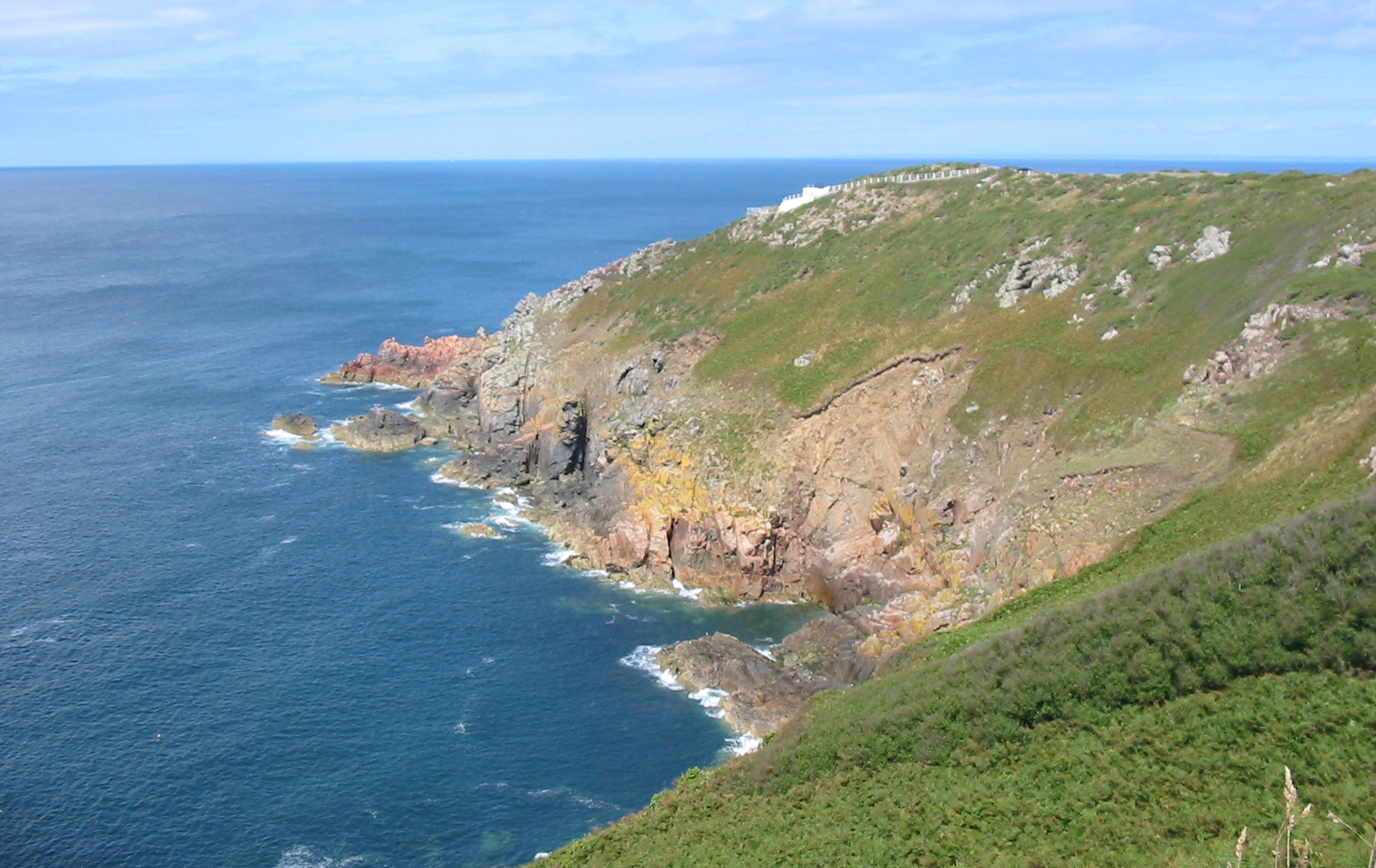
- Sorel

- Location within Jersey Location within Channel Islands
- Coordinates: 49°14′54″N 2°09′12″W
- Country: Jersey
- Parish: Saint John

Population (January 1, 2021)
  - Total: 769
- Time zone: UTC+00:00
- Postal code: JE4–8PA

La Vingtaine du Douet is one of the three vingtaines of the Parish of Saint John in Jersey, Channel Islands.

It includes the coastline that covers Sorel and its lighthouse and the quarries at Ronez.

The Vingtaine de Hérupe, Vingtaine du Nord and Vingtaine du Douet all form a single electoral district of St John.

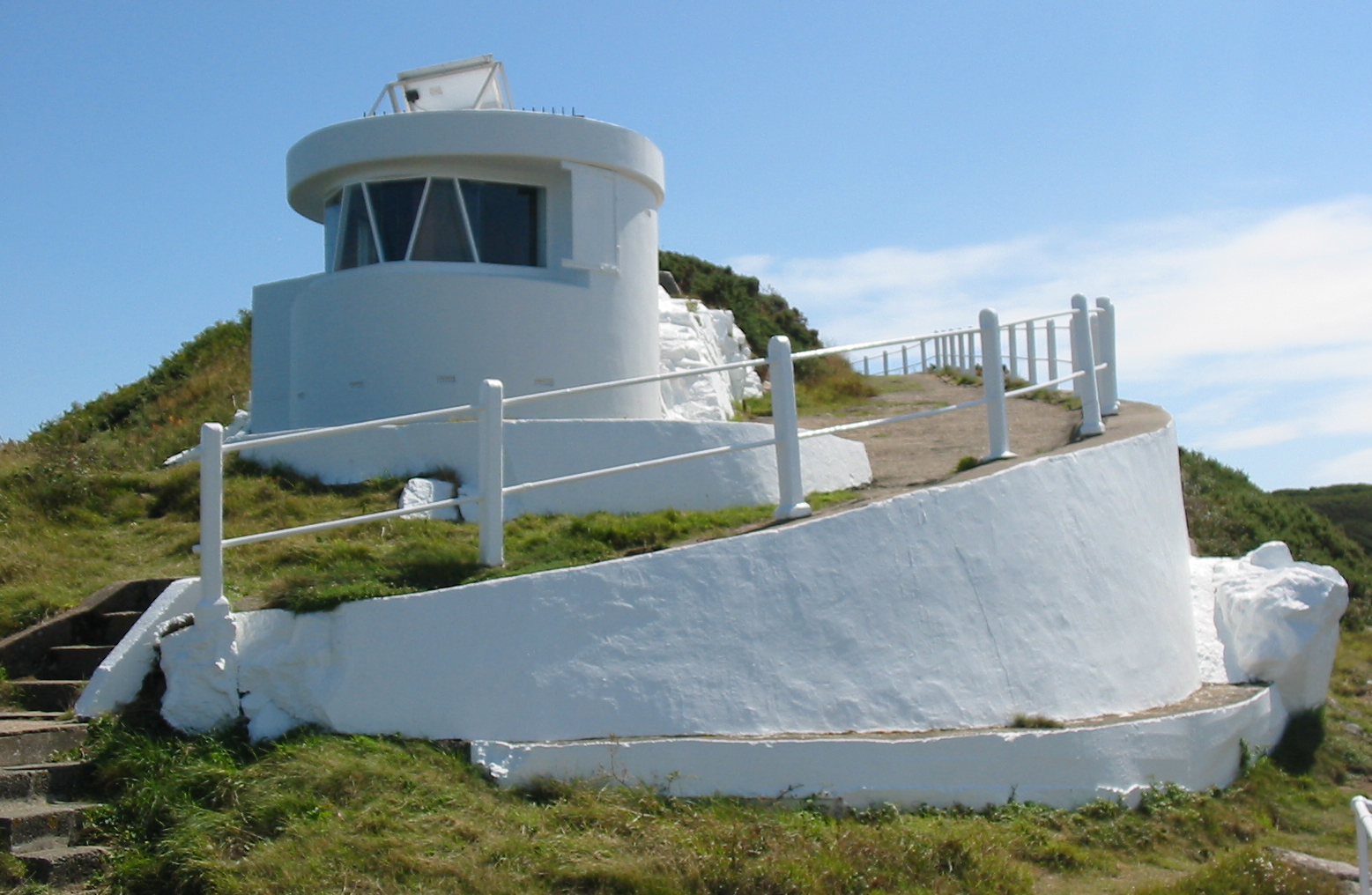
Sorel lighthouse

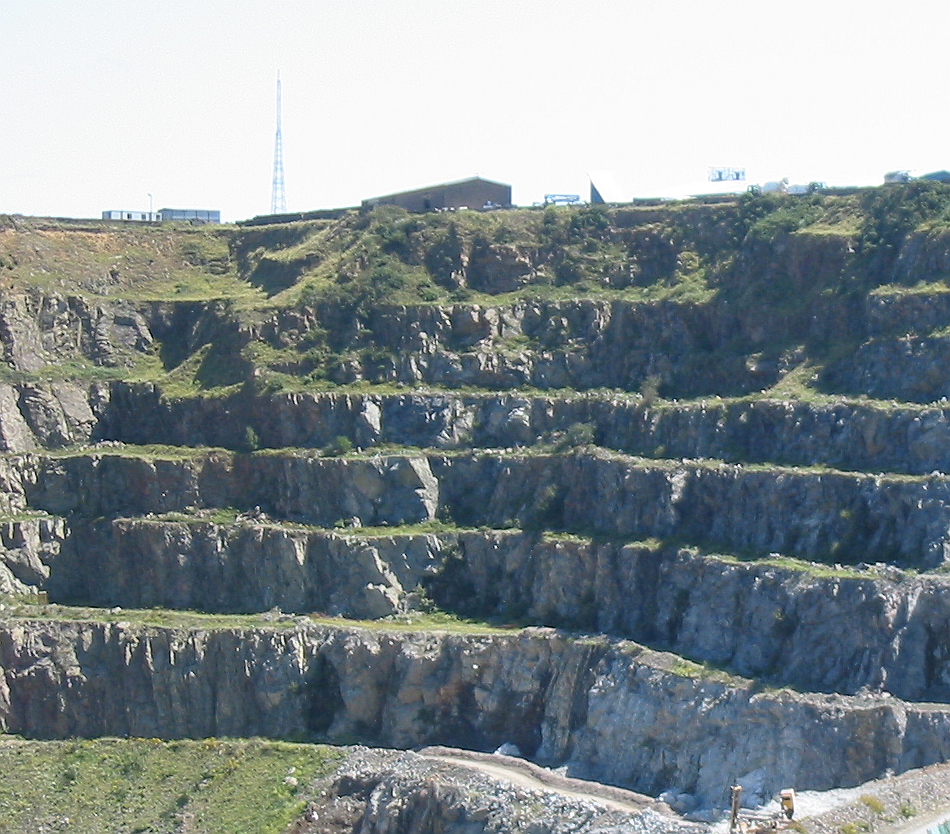
Ronez quarries
