= Bonne Nuit (Jersey) =

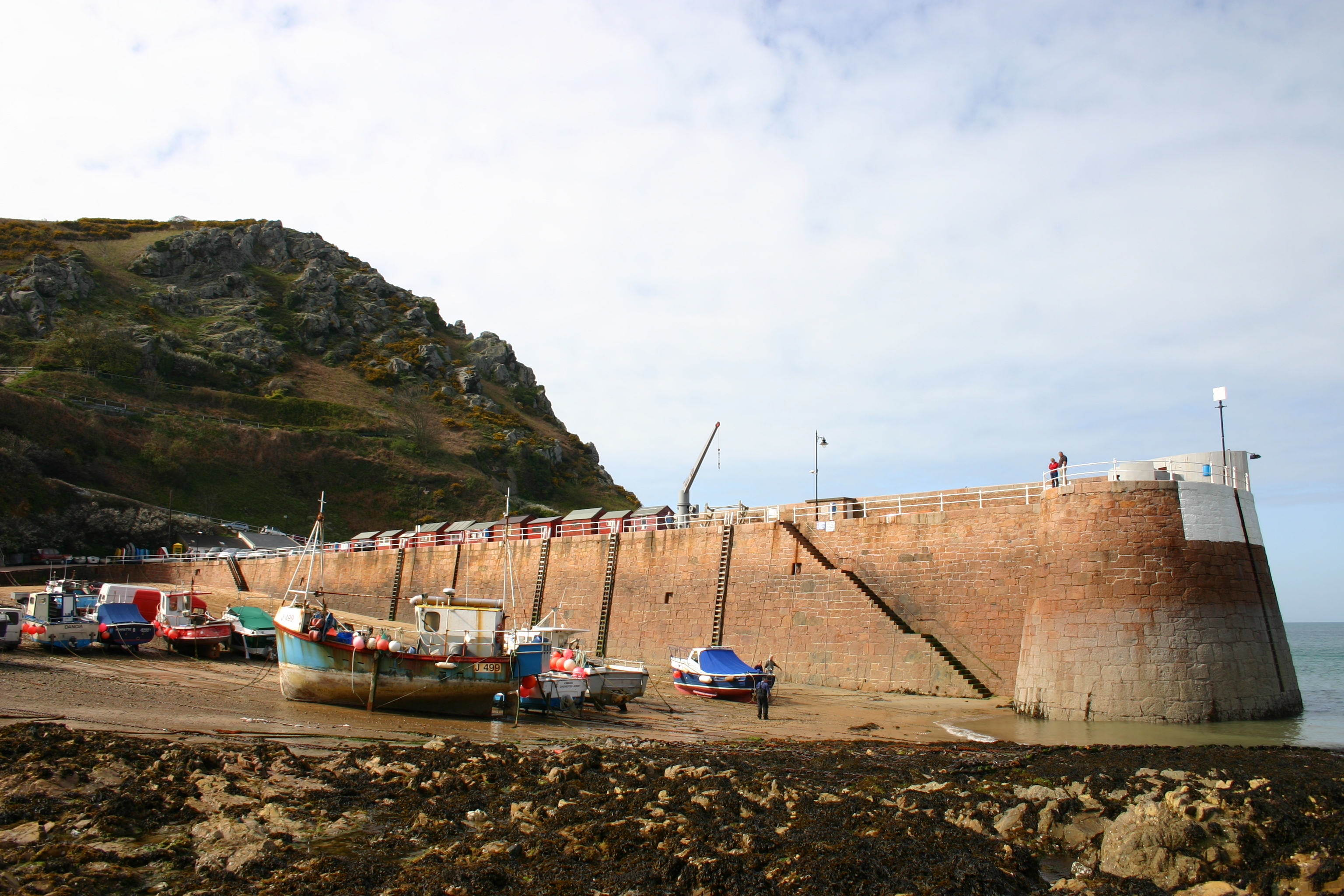
- Bonne Nuit
- Interactive map of Bonne Nuit

Location
- Location: Saint John, Jersey
- Coordinates: 49.2515°N 2.1191°W

Details
- Opened: 1872
- No. of piers: 1

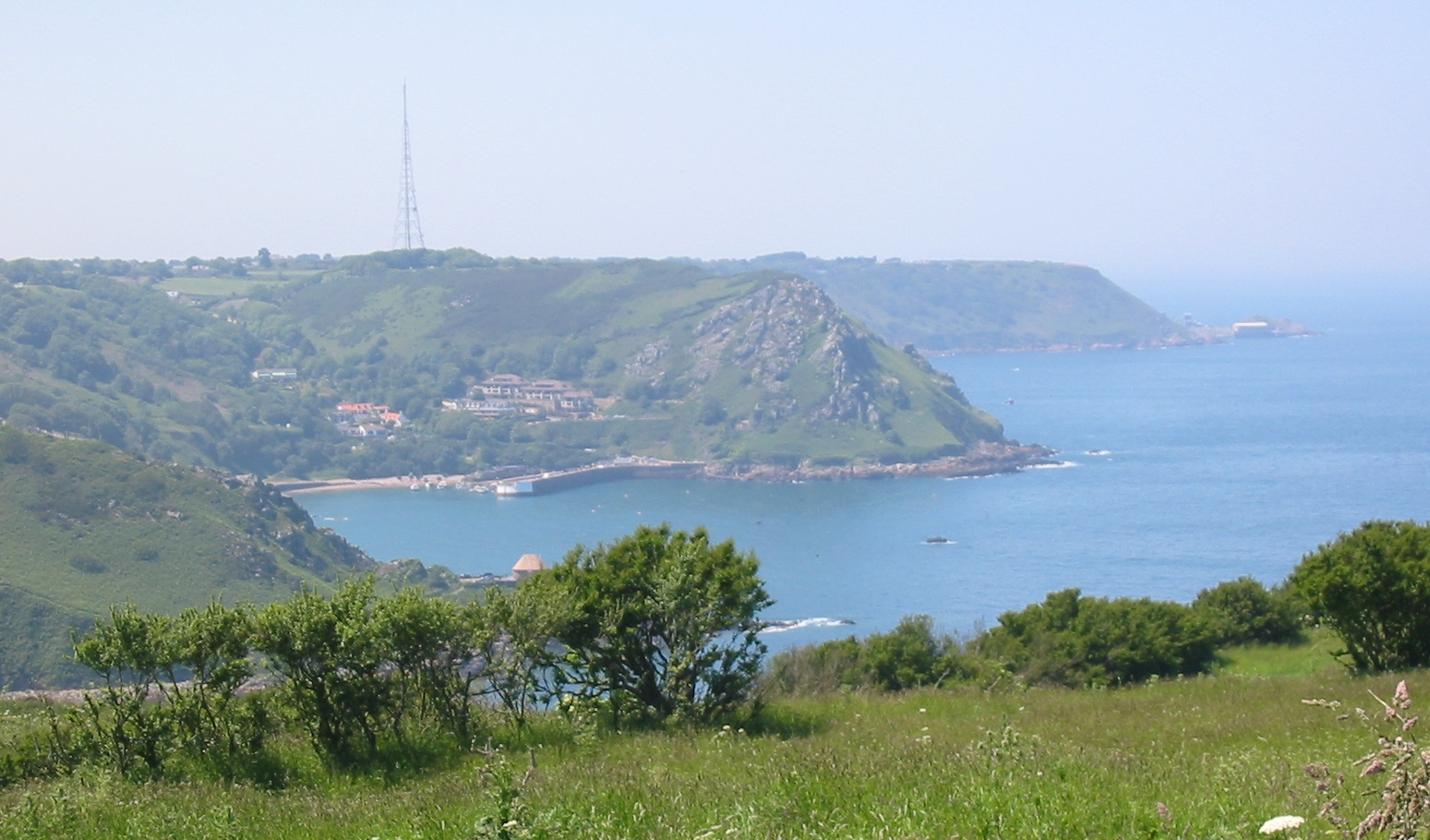
Bonne Nuit from the East

Bonne Nuit (Jèrriais: Bouonne Niet) is a small natural harbour in the Vingtaine du Nord, Saint John, Jersey, Channel Islands. Both Bonne Nuit in French and Bouonne Niet in Jèrriais mean "good night", referring to the shelter sailors could rely on by overnighting in the harbour. The bay nestles between the headlands of Frémont in the West and La Crête in the East.

== History ==
In 1150 Saint Mary's chapel in St John was given to the Abbey of Saint-Sauveur-le-Vicomte and was described as being the chapel de Bona Nocte. This is the first documentary reference to the name. The priory and chapel continued its existence, owning land at neighbouring Frémont, and being noted for the dinner the prior was obliged to offer to the Bailiff of Jersey, the Vicomte and the King's Receiver every Midsummer day. In 1413 all alien priories were suppressed; the site of the priory and chapel is now unknown.

The bay was used for smuggling in the 17th and 18th centuries. The first fortification was a battery of two cannons constructed in 1736. The threat of French invasion led to the building of a small fort at La Crête, overlooking both Bonne Nuit and the adjacent bay Le Havre Giffard, between 1816 and 1834. La Crête Fort, the official summer residence of the Lieutenant-Governor of Jersey, is currently used by Jersey Heritage Trust as a holiday-let property.

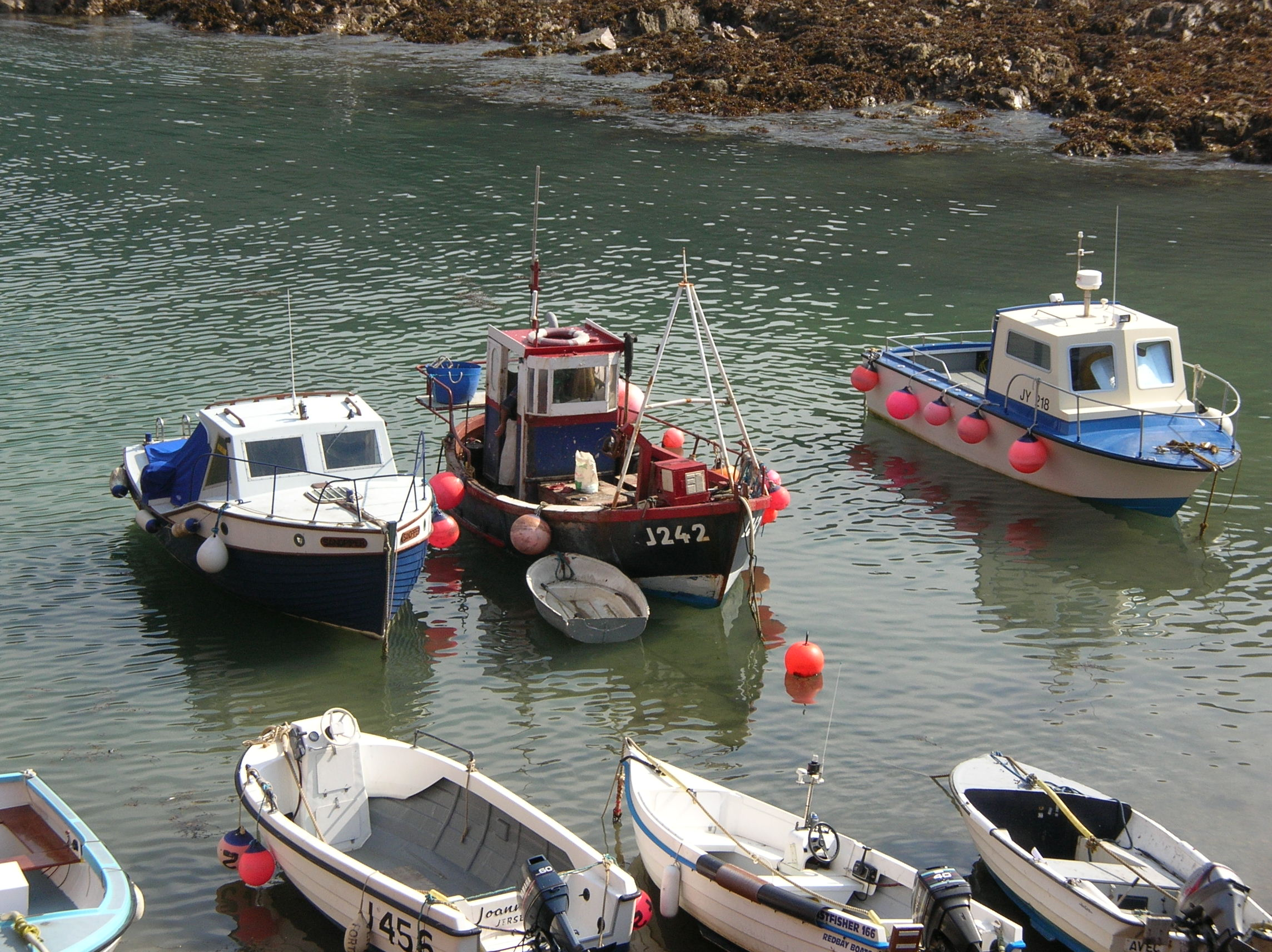
Some fishing continues from Bonne Nuit - mostly for crabs and lobsters

The pier was constructed in 1872 by the States of Jersey for fishing boats, and to serve the quarry of Mont Mado up above the bay.

Le Cheval Guillaume, a rock formation in the bay, was the focus of St John's Day (Midsummer) celebrations, as people would row round the rock for luck. According to legend, the rock is the petrified remains of a water sprite who took the form of a horse to abduct and drown a man called Guillaume in order to steal away his sweetheart Anne-Marie.

Several references and film scenes from the harbour were featured on "Bergerac", a BBC television show.

== Geography ==
There is a small beach with pebbles. La Vallette (a National Trust for Jersey property, Le Don Hudson) leads down La Falaise de la Vallette to the shore. Le Don Best, another National Trust for Jersey property also looks down into the bay.

The cliffs around the harbour are the highest paragliding launch site on the island. Favourable winds owing to the bowl-shaped harbour create exceptional lift.

== Transportation ==
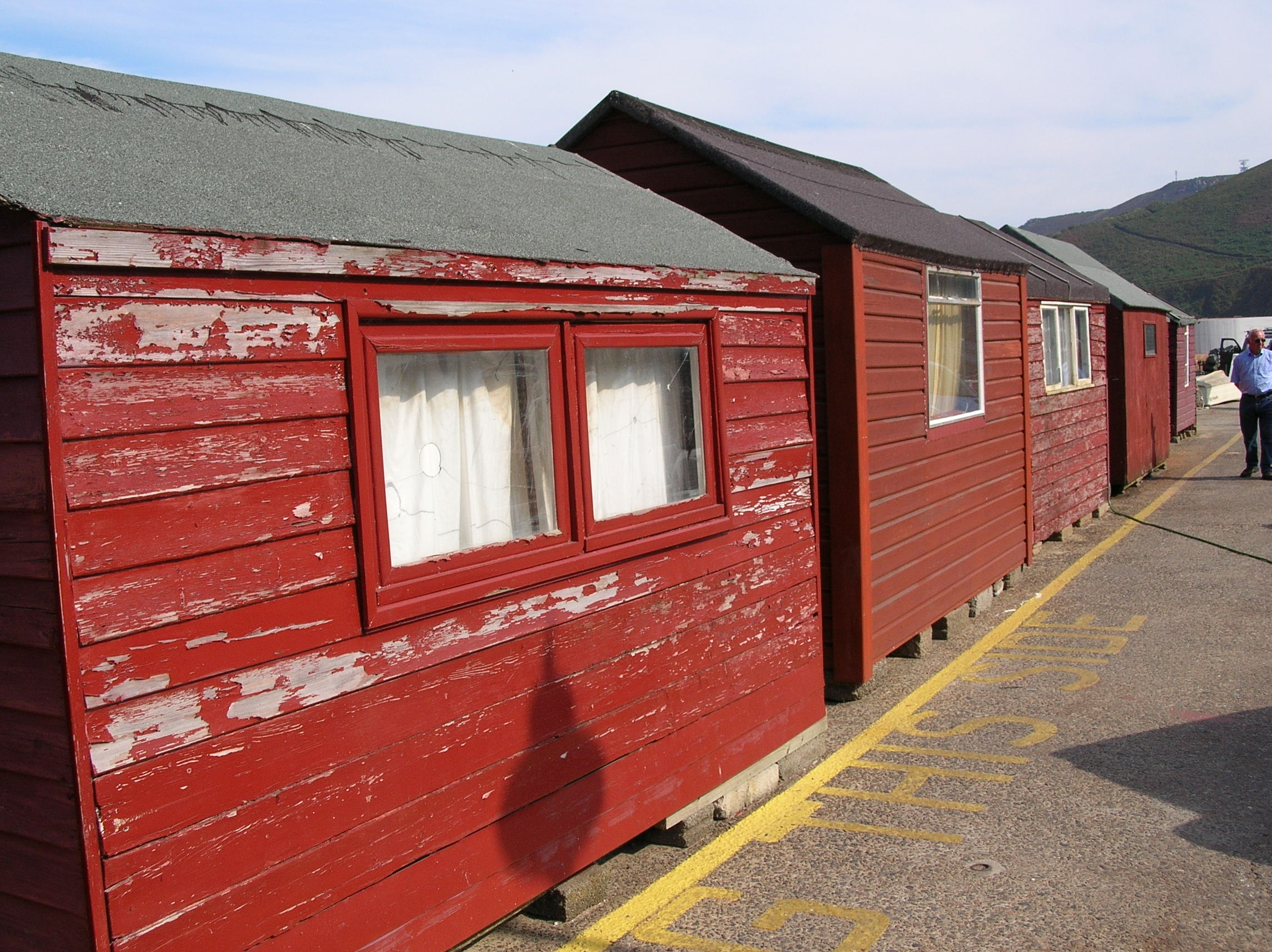
Harbourside huts are used by fishermen

The bay is linked to Saint Helier by bus route 4. Car parking is limited.
