= Vingtaine de la Croiserie =

Vingtaine in Trinity, Jersey

Vingtaine de la Croiserie is one of the five vingtaines of Trinity in the Channel Island of Jersey.
