= Vingtaine des Augerez =

Vingtaine in Saint Peter, Jersey

Vingtaine des Augerez is one of the five vingtaines of St Peter Parish on the Channel Island of Jersey.
