= Vingtaine des Augrès =

Vingtaine of Trinity in Jersey

Vingtaine des Augrès is one of the five vingtaines of Trinity in the Channel Island of Jersey.
