= Vingtaine du Sud =

Vingtaine in Saint Mary, Jersey

The Vingtaine du Sud (La Vîngtaine du Sud in Jèrriais) is one of the two vingtaines of the parish of St. Mary in Jersey in the Channel Islands.
