= Vingtaine du Coin Hâtain =

Vingtaine in Saint Lawrence, Jersey

Vingtaine du Coin Hâtain is one of the six vingtaines of St Lawrence Parish on the Channel Island of Jersey.
