= Vingtaine =

Political subdivision of Jersey in the Channel Islands

A vingtaine (French pronunciation: [vɛ̃tɛn], literally "group of twenty" in French), is a political subdivision of Jersey parishes. St Ouen has cueillettes (Jèrriais: Tchilliettes) instead of vingtaines. One, La Vingtaine de la Ville (The Vingtaine of the Town), in St Helier, is further divided into two cantons.

== Officers ==
Vingteniers are elected by a Parish Assembly for a term of three years but are elected to a particular vingtaine (or cueillette) in that Parish. They are sworn in as officers by the Royal Court.

== Honorary police ==
In each vingtaine, vingteniers and constable's officers (in French: officiers du connétable) are elected as part of Jersey's Honorary Police system. They do not have to live within the vingtaine or cueillette they represent, but they must live in the parish they represent (except in St. Helier, where ratepayers and mandataires are eligible).

Vingteniers carry out general community policing in the parish, and fulfill administrative roles within their vingtaine in respect of tasks such as the visite du branchage.

== Roads inspectors ==
Roads inspectors are elected to serve a vingtaine or cueillette at an assembly of the electors of the parish. They are responsible to for maintaining the highways and byways of the vingtaine. Roads inspectors report to and must enforce the decisions of the roads committee of the parish.

== Table of vingtaines ==
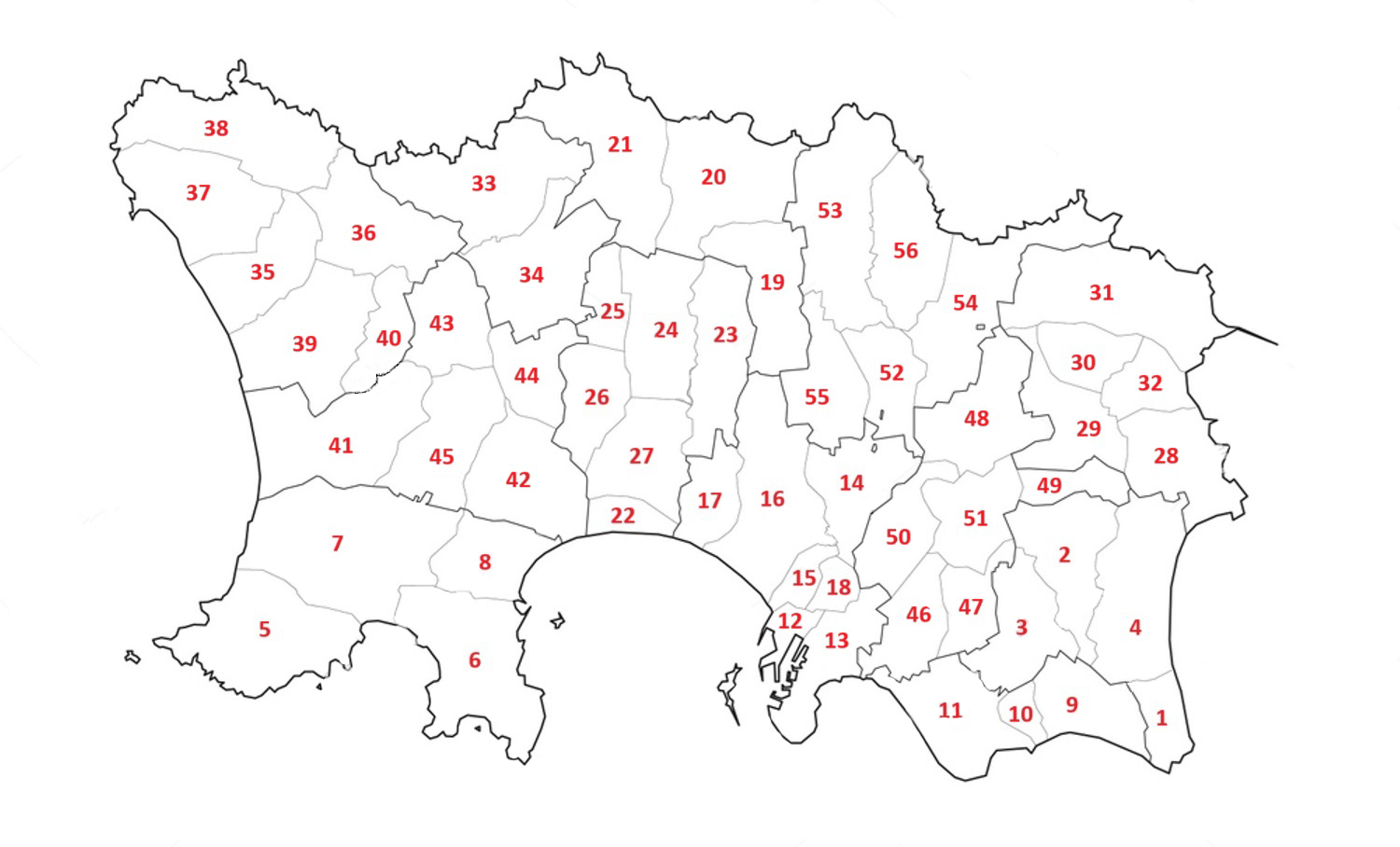
Vingtaines of Jersey

Parishes of Jersey

_id	Vingtaine	Parish	area hectares	population	density per km²	
1	La Vingtaine de la Rocque	Grouville	98.35	914	929.3	^{1}
2	La Vingtaine de la Rue	Grouville	220.25	441	200.2	
3	La Vingtaine de Longueville	Grouville	198.40	728	366.9	
4	La Vingtaine des Marais	Grouville	304.40	3318	1090.0	
5	La Vingtaine de la Moye	Saint Brélade	338.01	2161	639.3	
6	La Vingtaine de Noirmont	Saint Brélade	342.39	2505	731.6	
7	La Vingtaine des Quennevais	Saint Brélade	483.90	5358	1107.3	
8	La Vingtaine du Coin	Saint Brélade	163.16	988	605.5	
9	La Grande Vingtaine	St Clement	169.86	2292	1349.3	
10	La Vingtaine du Rocquier	Saint Clement	49.11	758	1543.5	
11	La Vingtaine de Samarès	Saint Clement	219.82	6875	3127.6	^{2}
12	Canton de Bas de la Vingtaine de la Ville	St Helier	33.22	1397	4205.3	^{6}
13	Canton de Haut de la Vingtaine de la Ville	St Helier	179.65	9784	5446.1	^{6}
14	La Vingtaine de Haut du Mont au Prêtre	St Helier	189.02	2939	1554.9	
15	La Vingtaine du Rouge Bouillon	St Helier	56.92	6726	11816.6	
16	La Vingtaine du Mont à l'Abbé	St Helier	334.48	7207	2154.7	
17	La Vingtaine du Mont Cochon	St Helier	125.89	1989	1580.0	
18	La Vingtaine de Bas du Mont au Prêtre	St Helier	44.96	5780	12855.9	
19	La Vingtaine de Hérupe	St John	227.44	861	378.6	
20	La Vingtaine du Nord	Saint John	322.06	1421	441.2	
21	La Vingtaine du Douet	Saint John	370.62	769	207.5	
22	La Vingtaine Bas de la Vallée	St Lawrence	67.69	2046	3022.6	
23	La Vingtaine du Coin Hâtain	Saint Lawrence	230.06	446	193.9	
24	La Vingtaine du Coin Motier	Saint Lawrence	227.76	622	273.1	
25	La Vingtaine du Coin Tourgis Nord	Saint Lawrence	91.18	560	614.2	
26	La Vingtaine du Coin Tourgis Sud	Saint Lawrence	157.19	356	226.5	
27	La Vingtaine Haut de la Vallée	Saint Lawrence	207.93	1531	736.3	
28	La Vingtaine de Faldouet	St Martin	221.98	1107	498.7	
29	La Vingtaine de la Quéruée	Saint Martin	186.18	1087	583.8	
30	La Vingtaine de l'Église	Saint Martin	109.81	598	544.6	
31	La Vingtaine de Rozel	Saint Martin	405.63	722	178.0	^{3}
32	La Vingtaine du Fief de la Reine	Saint Martin	104.53	434	415.2	
33	La Vingtaine du Nord	St Mary	359.69	539	149.9	^{4}
34	La Vingtaine du Sud	Saint Mary	295.61	1279	432.7	
35	La Cueillette de Grantez	St Ouen	206.05	542	263.0	^{5}
36	La Cueillette de Léoville	Saint Ouen	347.43	446	128.4	^{5}
37	La Cueillette de Millais	Saint Ouen	268.70	1452	540.4	^{5}
38	La Cueillette de Vinchelez	Saint Ouen	293.79	947	322.3	^{5}
39	La Grande Cueillette	Saint Ouen	298.48	583	195.3	^{5}
40	La Petite Cueillette	Saint Ouen	119.38	236	197.7	^{5}
41	La Grande Vingtaine	St Peter	366.65	837	228.3	
42	La Vingtaine de St. Nicolas	Saint Peter	254.00	2102	827.6	
43	La Vingtaine des Augerez	Saint Peter	183.15	506	276.3	
44	La Vingtaine du Coin Varin	Saint Peter	140.20	312	222.5	
45	La Vingtaine du Douet	Saint Peter	230.92	1507	652.6	
46	La Vingtaine de la Petite Longueville	St Saviour	148.67	5109	3436.5	
47	La Vingtaine de la Grande Longueville	Saint Saviour	112.61	468	415.6	
48	La Vingtaine de Maufant	Saint Saviour	239.25	1152	481.5	
49	La Vingtaine de Sous la Hougue	Saint Saviour	80.58	764	948.1	
50	La Vingtaine de Sous l'Église	Saint Saviour	158.16	4846	3064.0	
51	La Vingtaine des Pigneaux	Saint Saviour	189.06	1565	827.8	
52	La Vingtaine de la Croiserie	Trinity	144.21	287	199.0	
53	La Vingtaine de la Ville-à-l'Évêque	Trinity	350.91	707	201.5	
54	La Vingtaine de Rozel	Trinity	342.20	811	237.0	
55	La Vingtaine des Augrès	Trinity	183.24	676	368.9	
56	La Vingtaine du Rondin	Trinity	234.07	874	373.4	

== Notes ==
^1 includes the remote and uninhabited Minquiers
^2 includes La Motte Island
^3 including the remote and uninhabited Écréhous and Les Dirouilles
^4 including the remote and uninhabited Pierres de Lecq
^5 Unusually, the subdivisions of St Ouen parish are not named vingtaines, they are instead named cueillettes
^6 This canton is a subdivision of la Vingtaine de la Ville
