= La Motte, Jersey =

Tidal island, and listed archaeological site in Jersey

La Motte
- Green Island
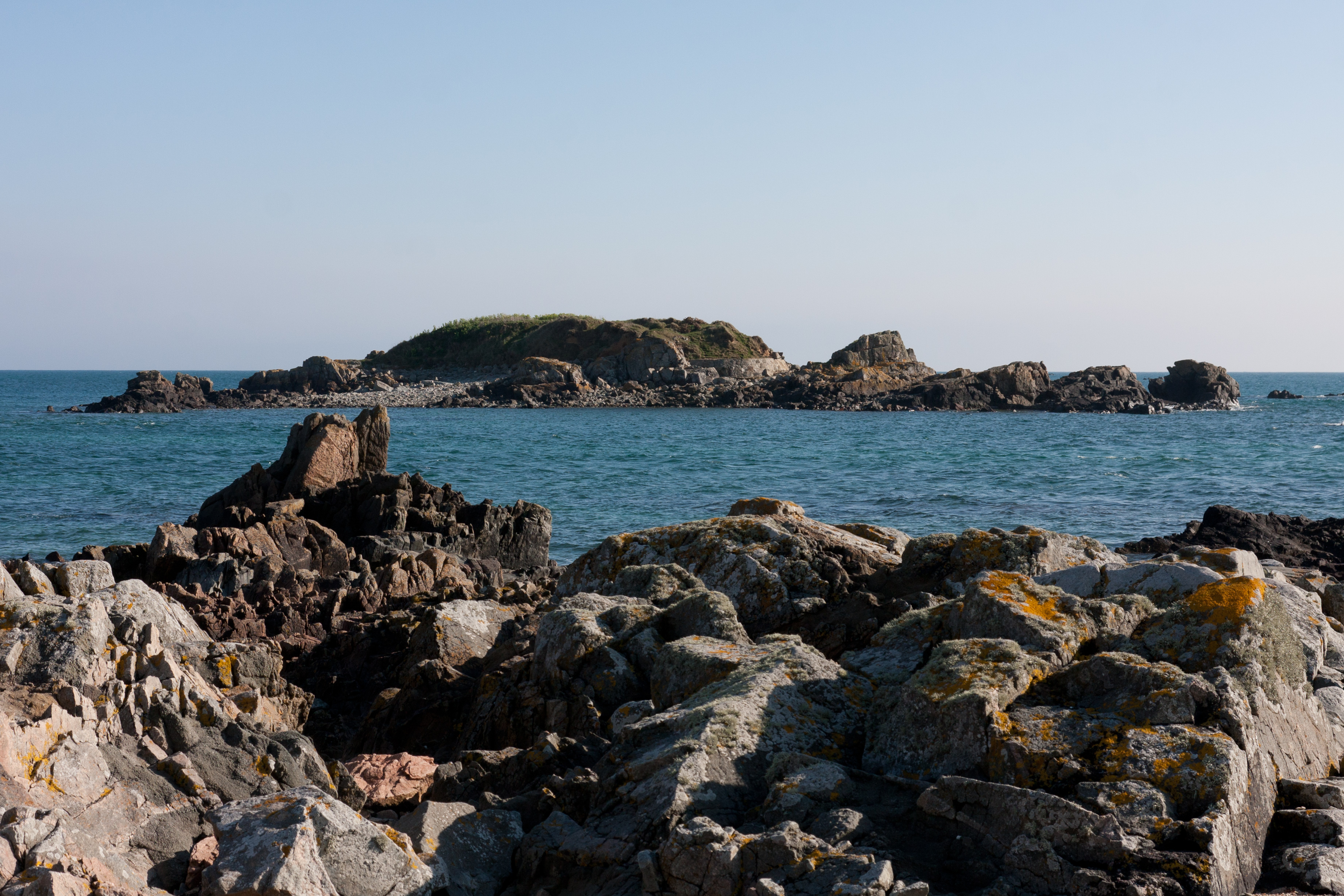
- The islet in 2012

- Location within Channel Islands
- 49°09′38″N 02°04′38″W
- Location: Vingtaine de Samarès, Jersey

La Motte (French pronunciation: [la mɔt]) is a tidal island, and listed archaeological site, also known as Green Island, located in the Vingtaine de Samarès in the parish of St Clement on the south-east coast of Jersey, Channel Islands.

There is evidence of human visits to the island since Neolithic times, having left a cairn, a number of middens and cists which were uncovered in the early 20th century. The island rises to 17 metres (56 ft) above mean sea level and can only be accessed at low tide. The rock is from the late Pleistocene covered with loess below a grassy surface.

== Location ==
The island is approximately 200 metres (660 ft) from the beach and rises to 17 metres (56 ft) above sea level. The island has a grassy surface and is predominantly clay surrounded by rocks. In recent times efforts have been made to reduce erosion of the island by the construction of walls and steps. It is only accessible at low tide and cut off twice a day when the sea water rises.

== Archaeology ==
Some archaeological evidence has been found here. Remains of a cemetery on La Motte are believed to be from later settlers. There are Neolithic elements including a cairn and a number of middens, dating from 1500 BC to 300 BC, on La Motte. The 18 cists have been removed, and transferred to the La Hougue Bie museum. They were excavated between 1911 and 1914.

== Geological site ==
The surrounding area and beach were listed as a site of special scientific interest in 2009. The rock was laid down in the late Pleistocene and is covered with preserved loess. They provide evidence of past environmental changes in the locality.

== Gallery ==
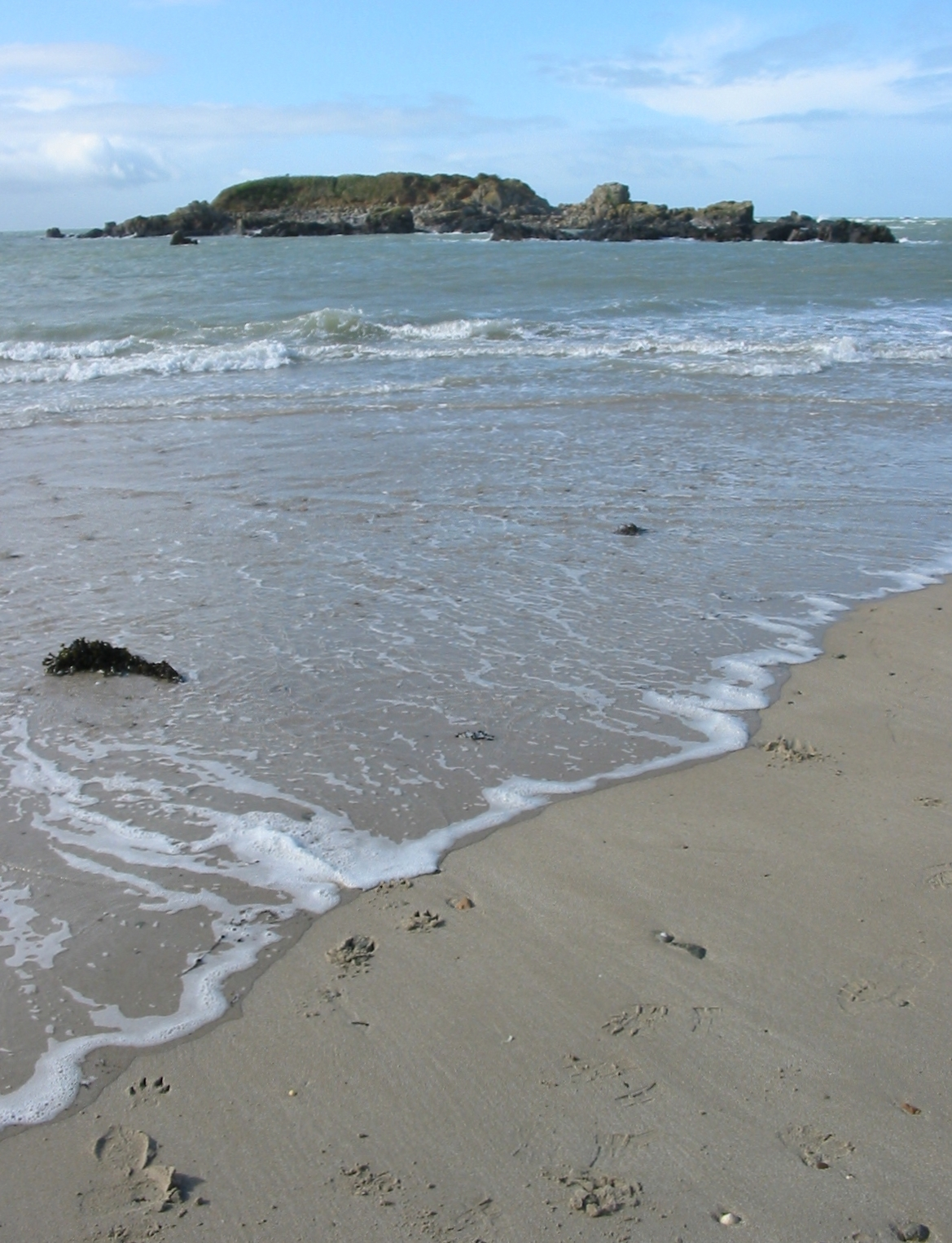
La Motte seen from the beach at La Sordonnière.

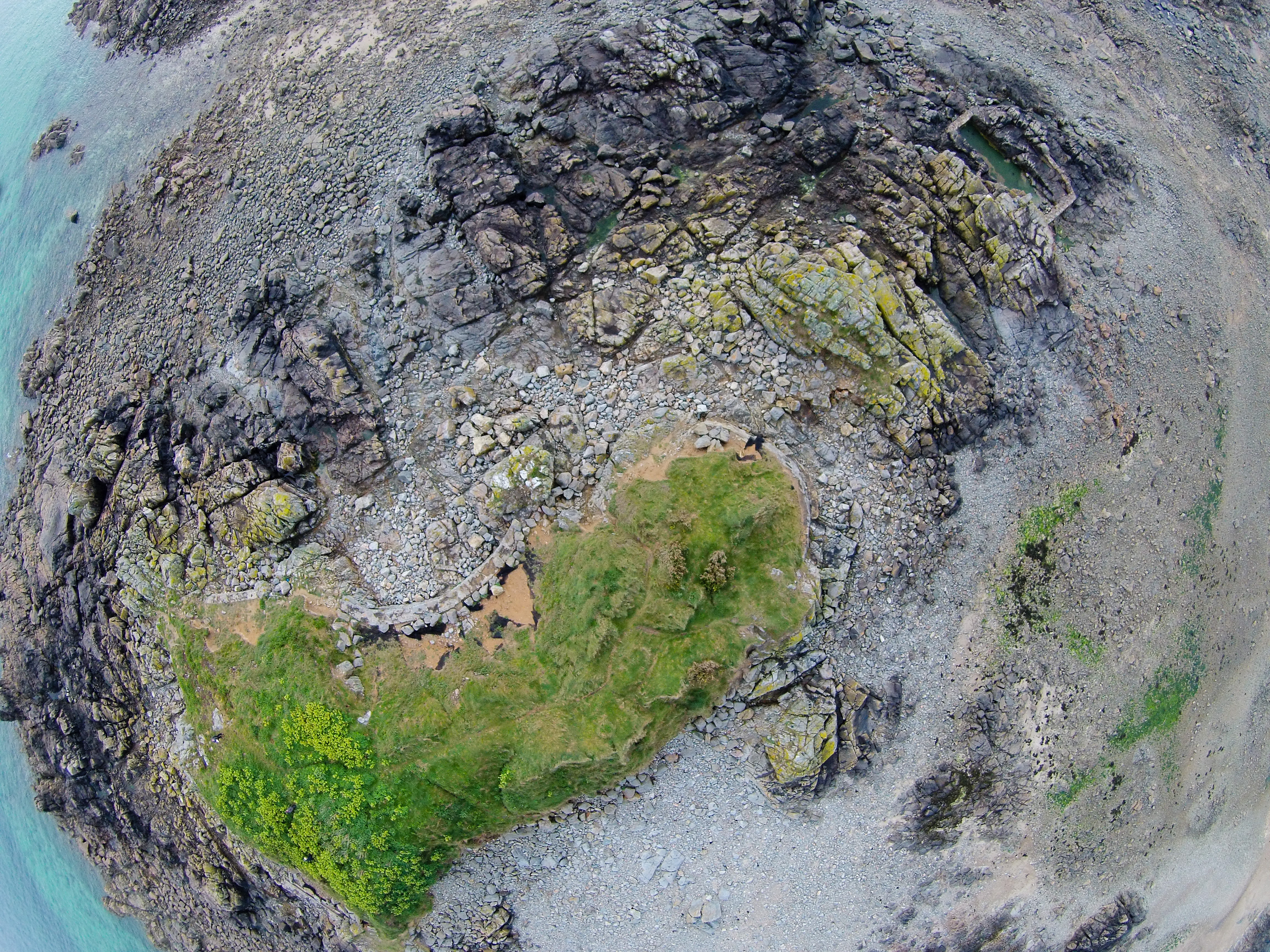
La Motte seen from the air.

== See also ==
- Archaeology of the Channel Islands
- Jersey dolmens
