= Vingtaine du Douet (St Peter) =

Vingtaine in Saint Peter, Jersey

Vingtaine du Douet is one of the five vingtaines of St Peter Parish on the Channel Island of Jersey.
