= Vingtaine de Longueville =

Vingtaine in Grouville, Jersey

- Vingtaine
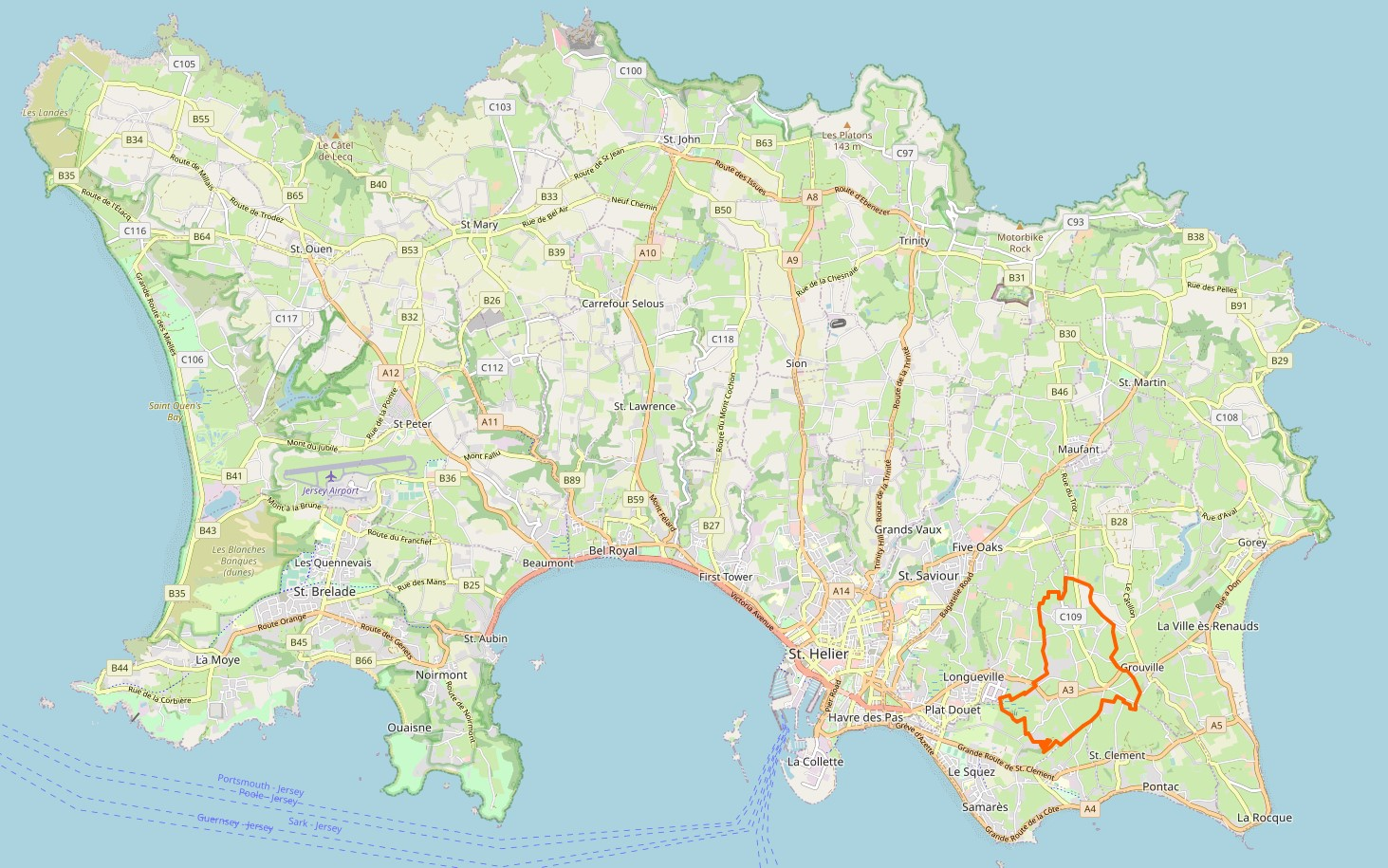
- Boundaries of the Vingtaine de Longueville

- Location of Vingtaine de Longueville (green) in Europe (dark grey)
- Coordinates: 49.1836°N 2.0634°W
- Island: Jersey
- Parish: Grouville

Area
  - Total: 1.984019 ha (4.90262 acres)

Population (2021-03-21)
  - Total: 728
  - Density: 36,700/km^{2} (95,000/sq mi)
- Time zone: UTC±00:00 (GMT)
  - Summer (DST): UTC+01:00 (BST)
- Website: grouville.je

Vingtaine de Longueville is one of the four vingtaines of the parish of Grouville on the Channel Island of Jersey.
