= JE postcode area =

Postcode area for Jersey

Jersey
- Postcode area
- Coordinates: 49.181°N 2.081°W
- Sovereign state responsible: United Kingdom
- Crown Dependency: Jersey
- Postcode area: JE
- Postcode area name: Jersey
- Post towns: 1
- Postcode districts: 5
- Postcode sectors: 29
- Postcodes (live): 3,290
- Postcodes (total): 3,576
- Statistics as at May 2020

The JE postcode area, also known as the Jersey postcode area, is a group of postal districts covering Jersey.

== Coverage ==
The approximate coverage of each postcode district:

Postcode district	Sector	Parish (or non-geographic use)
JE1	various	large users
JE2	3	Saint Helier
JE2	4	Saint Helier
JE2	6	Saint Clement
JE2	7	Saint Saviour
JE3	1	Saint Lawrence
JE3	2	Saint Ouen
JE3	3	Saint Mary
JE3	4	Saint John
JE3	5	Trinity
JE3	6	Saint Martin
JE3	7	Saint Peter
JE3	8	Saint Brélade
JE3	9	Grouville
JE4	various	PO boxes
JE5	various	bespoke delivery

The post town for all addresses is JERSEY.

== See also ==
- Postcode Address File
- Jersey Post
- List of postcode areas in the United Kingdom
- Guernsey postcode area
