= List of politicians in Jersey =

Updates December 2023, most are up-to-date however some are still being updated This list includes all elected officials who must take an oath of office before the Royal Court of Jersey.

== States of Jersey Assembly ==
Jersey's Parliament of elected representatives with the title of senator for whole island, connétable for each parish and deputy for the electoral districts. New list as of the election 7th June 2026

=== Island-wide elections ===
==== Senators ====
The role of senator was an elected politician with an elected mandate covering the whole of the Island of Jersey. There were eight seats in this position of office that allowed the electorate to vote from anywhere in the island, regardless of parish or vingtaigne district. This role was discontinued for the 2022 election leaving only constables of the respective twelve parishes and now thirty-seven deputies of newly adjusted constituencies as the island's political representation of the States Assembly.

In 2025 the States of Jersey Assembly voted to bring back the role of senator for the 2026 election. It is envisaged nine seats will be created, being one seat taken from each of the deputy districts.

- Senator - Tom Binet
- Senator - Sir Mark Boleat
- Senator - Lyndon John Farnham
- Senator - Ian Gorst
- Senator - Serena Kersten Guthrie
- Senator - Mary Le Hegarat
- Senator - Alan Maclean
- Senator - Helen Miles
- Senator - Elaine Millar

=== Parish-wide elections ===
- St Helier - Connétable - Inna Gardiner
- St Brelade - Connétable - Steve Pallett
- St Clement - Connétable - Marcus Troy
- Grouville - Connétable - Mark Labey
- St John - Connétable - Andy Jehan
- St Lawrence - Connétable - Tina Palmer
- St Martin - Connétable - Karen Shenton-Stone
- St Mary - Connétable - David Johnson
- St Ouen - Connétable - Richard Honeycombe
- St Peter - Connétable - Richard Vibert
- St Saviour - Connétable - David Curtis
- Trinity - Connétable - Andy Howell

=== Electoral district-wide elections ===
==== St Helier - South ====
- Deputy - Tom Coles
- Deputy - Samantha Gleave
- Deputy - Beatriz Porée

==== St Helier - Central ====
- Deputy - Carina Alves
- Deputy - Lee Carpenter
- Deputy - Catherine Curtis
- Deputy - Lyndsay Feltham

==== St Helier - North ====
- Deputy - Max Andrews
- Deputy - Victoria Li
- Deputy - Gerald Voisin

==== St Brelade ====
- Deputy - Gabriel Raimondo
- Deputy - Jonathan Renouf
- Deputy - Montfort Tadier

==== St Mary | St Ouen | St Peter ====
- Deputy - Arlene Maltman
- Deputy - Chris Rebindaine
- Deputy - Lucy Stephenson

==== St John | St Lawrence | Trinity ====
- Deputy - Hilary Jeune
- Deputy - Kirsten Morel
- Deputy - Phil Romeril

==== St Saviour ====
- Deputy - Louise Doublet
- Deputy - Malcolm Ferey
- Deputy - Chris Leck
- Deputy - Robert Parker

==== Grouville | St Martin ====
- Deputy - Rose Binet
- Deputy - Carolyn Labey

==== St Clement ====
- Deputy - Alex Curtis
- Deputy - Barbara Ward
- Deputy - Karen Wilson

=== Council of Ministers ===
The Council of Ministers is the governing members of, and chosen/voted by, the States of Jersey Assembly members.

- Chief Minister | Senator - Lyndon John Farnham
- Minister for Justice and Home Affairs | Senator - Helen Miles
- Minister for Treasury and Resources | Senator - Alan Maclean
- Minister for Health and Social Services | Senator - Tom Binet
- Minister for Social Security | Senator - Elaine Millar
- Minister for Regulation and Planning | Senator - Sir Mark Boleat
- Minister for Infrastructure | Deputy - Jonathan Renouf
- Minister for Environment | Senator - Mary Le Hegarat
- Minister for External Relations | Senator - Ian Gorst
- Minister for International Development | Deputy - Carolyn Labey
- Minister for Sustainable Economic Development | Deputy - Gerald Voisin
- Minister for Housing | Deputy - Malcolm Ferey
- Minister for Children and Families | Connétable - Richard Vibert
- Minister for Education and Lifelong Learning | Deputy - Catherine Curtis

== Municipality of St Helier (Capital) ==
=== Office of the Connétable ===
- Connétable of St Helier - Inna Gardiner
- Procureur du Bien Public - Peter Pearce
- Procureur du Bien Public - James Corbett

=== Rates Committee ===
- Rates Assessor - Jason Lagadu (Dec 2018)
- Rates Assessor - Alan Oliver (Dec 2022)
- Rates Assessor - Paula Every (Jan 2023) (Chairperson)
- Rates Assessor - Rosemary Furzer (Jan 2023)
- Rates Assessor - Sue Bennett (Jan 2025)

=== Roads Committee ===
- Principal of the Roads Committee - Jason Lagadu
- Principal of the Roads Committee - Heather-Anne Hubbell
- Principal of the Roads Committee - Bernard Manning
- Principal of the Roads Committee - Kevin Proctor
- Principal of the Roads Committee - Mario Pirozzolo
- Parish Rector (not elected) - The Very Reverend Mike Keirle (The Dean of Jersey)

=== Honorary Police & Roads Inspectors ===
- Centenier Daniel Scaife (Chef de Police)
- Centenier Paul Davies
- Centenier David Curtis
- Centenier Louise Happer
- Centenier Shirley Madden
- Centenier Peter Garrett
- Centenier Marta Fontes
- Centenier Paul Huelin
- Centenier Lesley Stirk
- Centenier Jane Pearce

==== Vingtaine ====
===== Vingtaine de la Ville =====
- Vingtenier Isaura De Castro
- Vingtenier Ben Wheaton
- Constable's Officer Diane Pontes
- Constable's Officer Patricia Esteves
- Roads Inspector Geraint Jennings
- Roads Inspector Eberhard Stegenwalner

===== Vingtaine du Mont Cochon =====
- Vingtenier Cindy Skinner
- Constable's Officer John Brawley
- Constable's Officer Heather Fowler
- Constable's Officer Rachel Nugent
- Constable's Officer Paulo Correia
- Roads Inspector Robert Morris
- Roads Inspector Eileen Morris

===== Vingtaine du Mont à l'Abbé =====
- Vingtenier Merces Pereira
- Constable's Officer Aneta Popiolek
- Constable's Officer Anthony Bougeard
- Roads Inspector Rosemary Boleat
- Roads Inspector Julie Bisson

===== Vingtaine du Rouge Bouillon =====
- Vingtenier Elizabeth Deahl
- Constable's Officer Thomas Nerac
- Constable's Officer Rosemary Le Mottee
- Constable's Officer Rachel Williams
- Roads Inspector Michael Channing
- Roads Inspector Martyn Gallery

===== Vingtaine de Bas du Mont au Prêtre =====
- Vingtenier Steve Gaston
- Constable's Officer Cristina Cercel
- Constable's Officer Elvis Vieira
- Constable's Officer Sinead Hanrahan
- Constable's Officer Aneta Jerziorska-Entwistle
- Roads Inspector Daren O’Toole
- Roads Inspector Julie Wallman

===== Vingtaine de Haut du Mont au Prêtre =====
- Vingtenier Liana Le Rossignol
- Constable's Officer Lauren Thomson
- Roads Inspector Sarah Richardson
- Roads Inspector Stephen Gavey

== Municipality of St Brelade ==
=== Office of the Connétable ===
- Connétable of St Brelade - Steve Pallett
- Procureur du Bien Public - Arthur Morley
- Procureur du Bien Public - Christopher Cooke

=== Rates Committee ===
- Rates Assessor - Roger Bignell
- Rates Assessor - Paul Hesten
- Rates Assessor - Mary Jordan
- Rates Assessor - Christine Vibert
- Rates Assessor - Geoffrey Winchester

=== Roads Committee ===
- Principal of the Roads Committee - Edward Baker
- Principal of the Roads Committee - Jeff Hathaway
- Principal of the Roads Committee - Michael George Videgrain
- Parish Rector (not elected) - Reverend Mark Bond

=== Honorary Police & Roads Inspectors ===
- Centenier Michel C Bougeard (Chef de Police)
- Centenier Raoul Gear
- Centenier David Wheeler
- Centenier Amanda Wright

==== Vingtaine ====
===== Vingtaine du =====
- Vingtenier
- Roads Inspector
- Roads Inspector

== Municipality of St Clement ==
=== Office of the Connétable ===
- Connétable of St Clement - Marcus Troy
- Procureur du Bien Public - Mrs S Mathew
- Procureur du Bien Public - Mr G Pirouet

=== Rates Committee ===
- Rates Assessor - Mr A Brown
- Rates Assessor - Mr N Falla
- Rates Assessor - Mrs R Mathew
- Rates Assessor - Mr M Robinson
- Rates Assessor - Mr G Toudic

=== Roads Committee ===
- Principal of the Roads Committee - Mr G Hamel
- Principal of the Roads Committee - Mr M Mathew
- Principal of the Roads Committee - Mr B Nibbs
- Parish Rector (not elected) - Canon D Shaw

=== Honorary Police & Roads Inspectors ===
- Centenier Mr P Heard (Chef de Police)
- Centenier Mrs T Kirton-Reid
- Centenier Mrs L Stubbs
- Centenier Mr E Wallis

==== Vingtaine ====
===== Vingtaine du Grande =====
- Vingtenier Mr M Watkins
- Roads Inspector Mr R Le Quesne
- Roads Inspector (Vacant)

===== Vingtaine du Roquier =====
- Vingtenier
- Roads Inspector Mr P Farrell
- Roads Inspector Dawn Heard

===== Vingtaine du Samares =====
- Vingtenier
- Roads Inspector Mr A Jelley
- Roads Inspector Mr K Romeril

== Municipality of Grouville ==
=== Office of the Connétable ===
- Connétable of Grouville - Mark Labey
- Procureur du Bien Public - Albert John Lamy
- Procureur du Bien Public - Peter James Le Cuirot

=== Rates Committee ===
- Rates Assessor - Mr Bruce Burnett
- Rates Assessor - Mr Robin Hamilton-Howes
- Rates Assessor - Mr Andrew Koester
- Rates Assessor - Mr Adrian Le GaL
- Rates Assessor - Mr Anthony Powell

=== Roads Committee ===
- Principal of the Roads Committee - David Cummins
- Principal of the Roads Committee - Eric Gavey
- Principal of the Roads Committee - William Stanley Payn
- Parish Rector (not elected) - Reverend Helen Gunton

=== Honorary Police & Roads Inspectors ===
- Centenier Mr Drew Livingston (Chef de Police)
- Centenier Mr Paul Robinson
- Centenier
- Centenier

==== Vingtaine ====
===== Vingtaine de Marais =====
- Vingtenier
- Roads Inspector Mr Jack Hanby
- Roads Inspector Mr William Payn

===== Vingtaine de La Rocque =====
- Vingtenier Mrs Tracy Laurent
- Roads Inspector Mr Claude Bertram
- Roads Inspector Mr Barrie Hamel

===== Vingtaine de Longueville =====
- Vingtenier Mrs Ewa Gracz
- Roads Inspector Mr Michael Labey
- Roads Inspector Mr Neil Wade

===== Vingtaine de La Rue =====
- Vingtenier Mr Akim-Maria Ellah
- Roads Inspector Mr Andrew Labey
- Roads Inspector Mr Philip Le Maistre

== Municipality of St John ==
=== Office of the Connétable ===
- Connétable of St John - Andy Jehan
- Procureur du Bien Public - Julian Guegan
- Procureur du Bien Public - Trevor Tirel

=== Rates Committee ===
- Rates Assessor - Mr Paul Berks
- Rates Assessor - Mrs Joanna Brown
- Rates Assessor - Mr John Le Bas
- Rates Assessor - Mrs Jane Luce
- Rates Assessor - Mr Will Simpson

=== Roads Committee ===
- Principal of the Roads Committee - Nicholas Lane
- Principal of the Roads Committee - Edward Le Cornu
- Principal of the Roads Committee - Peter Pallot
- Parish Rector (not elected) - Reverend Beverley Sproats

=== Honorary Police & Roads Inspectors ===
- Centenier (Chef de Police)
- Centenier Andrew Bisson
- Centenier Francois Le Luyer
- Centenier David Ward

==== Vingtaine ====
===== Vingtaine du Nord =====
- Vingtenier Ian Syvret
- Roads Inspector Alan Coutanche
- Roads Inspector David Gallichan

===== Vingtaine du Douet =====
- Vingtenier Sharnie Olliver
- Roads Inspector Stephen Masters
- Roads Inspector Ralph Morin

===== Vingtaine du Herupe =====
- Vingtenier Ian Averty
- Roads Inspector Kevin Armstrong
- Roads Inspector Colin Queree

== Municipality of St Lawrence ==
=== Office of the Connétable ===
- Connétable of St Lawrence - Tina Palmer
- Procureur du Bien Public - Bruce Harrison
- Procureur du Bien Public - Stephen Linney

=== Rates Committee ===
- Rates Assessor - Mrs Marion Hibbeard
- Rates Assessor - Mr Adrian Renouf
- Rates Assessor - Mr Stephen Ross-Gower
- Rates Assessor - Ms Pam Staley
- Rates Assessor - Mrs Toni Pittom

=== Roads Committee ===
- Principal of the Roads Committee - Jennifer Cartwright
- Principal of the Roads Committee - Eton Winston Le Brun
- Principal of the Roads Committee - Rodney Pallot
- Parish Rector (not elected) - Reverend Philip Warren

=== Honorary Police & Roads Inspectors ===
- Centenier Stuart Lusby (Chef de Police)
- Centenier Jackie Brookfield
- Centenier James Gray
- Centenier Mike Haden

==== Vingtaine ====
===== Vingtaine Coin Hatain =====
- Vingtenier Trevor Le Cornu
- Roads Inspector Derrick Frigot
- Roads Inspector David Pittom

===== Vingtaine Coin Tourigs Sud =====
- Vingtenier Noel Le Fondre
- Roads Inspector Matthew Bartlett
- Roads Inspector Monica Ison

===== Vingtaine Coin Tourigs Nord =====
- Vingtenier
- Roads Inspector David Renault
- Roads Inspector (Vacant)

===== Vingtaine Coin Motier =====
- Vingtenier
- Roads Inspector Mark Bingle
- Roads Inspector Ian Le Brun

===== Vingtaine Haut de la Vallee =====
- Vingtenier
- Roads Inspector Gerald Le Brun
- Roads Inspector Michel Stephan

===== Vingtaine Bas de la Vallee =====
- Vingtenier
- Roads Inspector Christine Gill
- Roads Inspector Guillaume Staal

== Municipality of St Martin ==
=== Office of the Connétable ===
- Connétable of St Martin - Karen Shenton-Stone
- Procureur du Bien Public - Lester Richardson
- Procureur du Bien Public - William Sutton

=== Rates Committee ===
- Rates Assessor - Mr Martin Houguez (Chairman)
- Rates Assessor - Mr C G (Bob) Pallot
- Rates Assessor - Mr Steven Rondel
- Rates Assessor - Mr William Sutton
- Rates Assessor - Mr R A (Bob) White

=== Roads Committee ===
- Principal of the Roads Committee - Michael Jehan
- Principal of the Roads Committee - Richard Le Cornu
- Principal of the Roads Committee - Daniel Wherry
- Parish Rector (not elected) -

=== Honorary Police & Roads Inspectors ===
- Centenier Mr G Jones (Chef de Police)
- Centenier Mr D Burmingham
- Centenier Mr A Phillips
- Centenier Ms T Roland

==== Vingtaine ====
===== Vingtaine de Faldouet =====
- Vingtenier Mr S L Falle
- Roads Inspector Arthur Manning
- Roads Inspector Martin Pallot

===== Vingtaine de La Fief Du Roi =====
- Vingtenier Mr N de Nobrega
- Roads Inspector Sean Corson
- Roads Inspector Steven de Gruchy

===== Vingtaine de La Queruee =====
- Vingtenier Mrs E Foley
- Roads Inspector Paul Le Bihan
- Roads Inspector Stephen de la Haye

===== Vingtaine de Rozel =====
- Vingtenier Mr M Cobden
- Roads Inspector Michael Baudains
- Roads Inspector Colin de la Haye

===== Vingtaine de L'Eglise =====
- Vingtenier
- Roads Inspector Christopher Kelleher
- Roads Inspector Steven Rondel

== Municipality of St Mary ==
=== Office of the Connétable ===
- Connétable of St Mary - David Johnson
- Procureur du Bien Public - Cynthia Cotilliard
- Procureur du Bien Public - David Munns

=== Rates Committee ===
- Rates Assessor - Cynthia Cotillard
- Rates Assessor - Shirley de Gruchy
- Rates Assessor - Les Stanton
- Rates Assessor - Robin Stockton
- Rates Assessor - Martin Stodart

=== Roads Committee ===
- Principal of the Roads Committee - Peter Le Liard
- Principal of the Roads Committee - Trevor Le Sage
- Principal of the Roads Committee - Alan Moullin
- Parish Rector (not elected) - Reverend Kirsty Allan

=== Honorary Police & Roads Inspectors ===
- Centenier Chris Bunt (Chef de Police)
- Centenier John Alcock
- Centenier Glynn Bower
- Centenier Jim Drew

==== Vingtaine ====
===== Vingtaine du Nord =====
- Vingtenier Annette Johnston
- Roads Inspector Adrian de Gruchy
- Roads Inspector Emille Drean

===== Vingtaine du Sud =====
- Vingtenier Sue Heppolette
- Roads Inspector Ivor Barette
- Roads Inspector Jeremy Holmes

== Municipality of St Ouen ==
=== Office of the Connétable ===
- Connétable of St Ouen - Richard Honeycombe
- Procureur du Bien Public - Mr R Le Bas
- Procureur du Bien Public - Mr A Quenault

=== Rates Committee ===
- Rates Assessor - Mr L Armstrong
- Rates Assessor - Mr M J Grigg
- Rates Assessor - Mr N Hall
- Rates Assessor - Mr P James
- Rates Assessor - Mr D C Sharp

=== Roads Committee ===
- Principal of the Roads Committee - Mr J P A’Court
- Principal of the Roads Committee - Mr R J Michel
- Principal of the Roads Committee - Mr J G Reed
- Parish Rector (not elected) -

=== Honorary Police & Roads Inspectors ===
- Centenier Mr R Hall (Chef de Police)
- Centenier Mr B Connor
- Centenier Mr W A P du Feu
- Centenier Mrs T Surcouf

==== Vingtaine ====
===== Vingtaine du Grande Cueillette =====
- Vingtenier Ms C. Pinchard
- Roads Inspector Mr N R Vautier
- Roads Inspector Mr S J Vautier

===== Vingtaine du Petite Cueillette =====
- Vingtenier
- Roads Inspector Mr D J Hamilton
- Roads Inspector Mr G C Pallot

===== Vingtaine du Cueillette de Grantez =====
- Vingtenier Mr R D Brown
- Roads Inspector Mr P James
- Roads Inspector Mr D A Richardson

===== Vingtaine du Cueillette de Leoville =====
- Vingtenier Mr T Le Maistre
- Roads Inspector Mr H Batho
- Roads Inspector Mr P F Batho

===== Vingtaine du Cueillette de Millais =====
- Vingtenier
- Roads Inspector Mr J E Le Masurier
- Roads Inspector Mr A M Le Sech

===== Vingtaine du Cueillette de Vinchelez =====
- Vingtenier Ms J-A Grundy
- Roads Inspector Mr A M Malzard
- Roads Inspector Mr N J Le Masurier

== Municipality of St Peter ==
=== Office of the Connétable ===
- Connétable of St Peter - Richard Vibert
- Procureur du Bien Public - Christopher Benest
- Procureur du Bien Public - Robert Surcouf

=== Rates Committee ===
- Rates Assessor - Mr Rogel Noel (Chairman)
- Rates Assessor - Mr Eric Le Ruez
- Rates Assessor - Mrs Zoe Rive
- Rates Assessor - Mr Graeme Rondel
- Rates Assessor - Mrs Jean Shales

=== Roads Committee ===
- Principal of the Roads Committee - Keith Capern
- Principal of the Roads Committee - Paul Townsend
- Principal of the Roads Committee - Martin Zimmer
- Parish Rector (not elected) -

=== Honorary Police & Roads Inspectors ===
- Centenier Joao Camara (Chef de Police)
- Centenier Pavel Bosak
- Centenier Francois “Guy” Le Maistre
- Centenier Marion Romeril

==== Vingtaine ====
===== Vingtaine du Douet =====
- Vingtenier Gerald Le Ruez
- Roads Inspector James Machon
- Roads Inspector Graeme Pallot

===== Vingtaine du Grande =====
- Vingtenier Tony Alves
- Roads Inspector Steve Morin
- Roads Inspector Nigel Rive

===== Vingtaine du Coin Varin =====
- Vingtenier Vincent Piron
- Roads Inspector Peter D’Anger
- Roads Inspector Peter Lamy

===== Vingtaine du St Nicolas =====
- Vingtenier Dave Robinson
- Roads Inspector Bill Dempsey
- Roads Inspector John Payn

== Municipality of St Saviour ==
=== Office of the Connétable ===
- Connétable of St Saviour - David Curtis
- Procureur du Bien Public - Richard Le Quesne
- Procureur du Bien Public - Martin Roberts

=== Rates Committee ===
- Rates Assessor - Mrs Margaret Forde
- Rates Assessor - Mr Thomas Gales
- Rates Assessor - Mrs Jill Moody
- Rates Assessor - Miss Lesley Norton
- Rates Assessor - Miss Karen Wilson

=== Roads Committee ===
- Principal of the Roads Committee - Peter Blampied
- Principal of the Roads Committee - Geoffrey Morris
- Principal of the Roads Committee - Stuart Pirouet
- Parish Rector (not elected) - Reverend Martin Evans

=== Honorary Police & Roads Inspectors ===
- Centenier Mr P Berrill
- Centenier Mr S Friel
- Centenier Mr S Laffoley-Edwards
- Centenier Mr P Martins
- Centenier Mr J Richards
- Centenier Mr T Ruane
- Centenier Vacant, Assermenté

==== Vingtaine ====
===== Vingtaine du Maufant =====
- Vingtenier
- Roads Inspector Cara Miller
- Roads Inspector Katrina Wyatt

===== Vingtaine du Sous La Hougue =====
- Vingtenier Mr A Goncalves
- Roads Inspector Paul Houzé
- Roads Inspector Stephen Wyatt

===== Vingtaine du Grande Longueville =====
- Vingtenier Ms J Maddox
- Roads Inspector Duncan Maguire
- Roads Inspector Elizabeth Pryke

===== Vingtaine du Petite Longueville =====
- Vingtenier Mr N Byrne
- Roads Inspector Andrew Le Gallais
- Roads Inspector Andrew Pryke

===== Vingtaine du Pigneaux =====
- Vingtenier Mr D Hallam
- Roads Inspector Barry De La Mare
- Roads Inspector Francis Le Quesne

===== Vingtaine du Sous L'Eglise =====
- Vingtenier Nigel John Tanner, Assermenté 19 December 2014
- Roads Inspector Colin Ireson
- Roads Inspector

== Municipality of Trinity ==
=== Office of the Connétable ===
- Connétable of Trinity - Andy Howell
- Procureur du Bien Public - Mr J Moulin
- Procureur du Bien Public - Mr P Williams

=== Rates Committee ===
- Rates Assessor - Mrs A Hassell
- Rates Assessor - Mr Gordon Hayden
- Rates Assessor - Mr Alan Otterwell
- Rates Assessor - Mr R Parker
- Rates Assessor - Mr Christopher Simpson

=== Roads Committee ===
- Principal of the Roads Committee - Mr A Dunford
- Principal of the Roads Committee - Mr B Fossey
- Principal of the Roads Committee - Mr N Le Maistre
- Parish Rector (not elected) - Reverend G Houghton

=== Honorary Police & Roads Inspectors ===
- Centenier (Chef de Police)
- Centenier Mr S De Louche
- Centenier Mr J Howell
- Centenier Mr D Owen
- Centenier Mr O Simmons

==== Vingtaine ====
===== Vingtaine du Augre =====
- Vingtenier Mr C Fossey
- Roads Inspector Mr B Dorrington
- Roads Inspector Mr B C Rondel

===== Vingtaine du Crosierie =====
- Vingtenier Mrs Amanda Ingram
- Roads Inspector Mr C Bright
- Roads Inspector Mr J Le S Gallichan, Jnr

===== Vingtaine du L'Eveque =====
- Vingtenier Mrs J Ozouf
- Roads Inspector Mr L Agnes
- Roads Inspector Mr J-E Le Maistre

===== Vingtaine du Rondin =====
- Vingtenier Mr J Dias
- Roads Inspector Mr M L Le Var
- Roads Inspector Mrs S Stein

===== Vingtaine du Rozel =====
- Vingtenier Mrs O Priestley
- Roads Inspector Mr J Drelaud
- Roads Inspector Mr B Jeanne
