= Elections in Jersey =

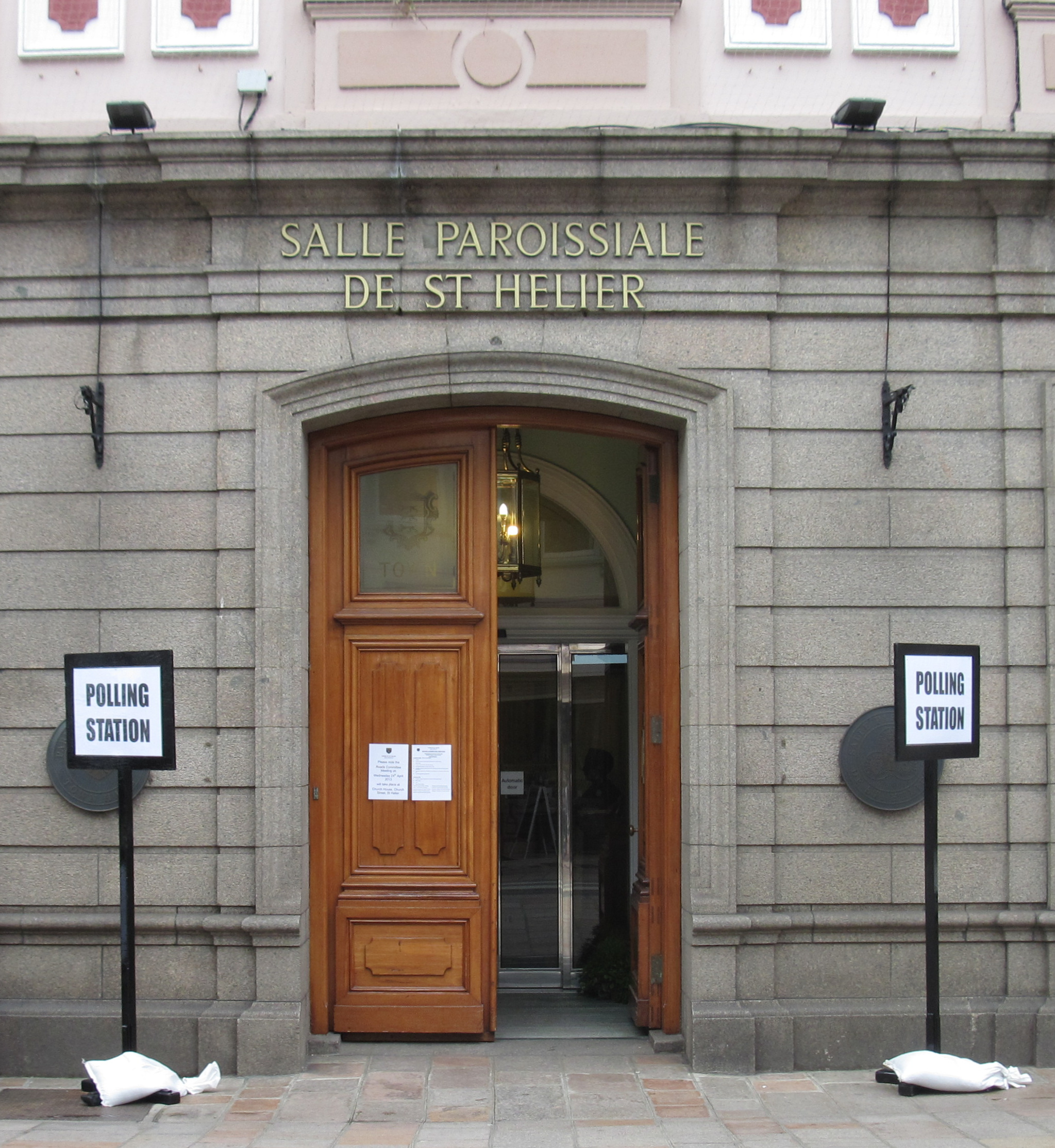
St Helier Town Hall being used as a polling station for the 2013 electoral reform referendum

Elections in Jersey take place for the States Assembly and at parish-level. Various political parties and candidate supporting groups have been formed over the years in Jersey, but most candidates stand for election not affiliated to any political party.

Elections in Jersey use a plurality-based voting system, with voters able to cast different numbers of votes depending on the office. In 2008, the voting age was reduced to 16 years.

== National elections ==
Jersey elects the States Assembly, its legislature. Elections to the States Assembly are held every four years. The elections are overseen by the Jersey Electoral Authority. Jersey's most recent island-wide election took place on Sunday 7 June 2026.

Since June 2026, the States Assembly has 49 elected members: nine senators (elected on an island-wide basis), 28 deputies (elected in single- and multi-seat constituencies) and 12 connétables (heads of the parishes).

Voters may cast up to nine votes for senator, one vote for connétable and between two and four votes for deputy depending on their constituency.

=== Senators ===
Senators are elected on an island-wide basis to the States Assembly. Since the 2026 general election, Jersey has elected nine senators, with voters able to cast up to nine votes.

The office of senator was created in 1948. Senators were historically elected on an island-wide basis, with all voters able to vote for candidates across Jersey. The length of a senator's term was originally nine years, later reduced to six years in 1966 and four years in 2011.

The number of senators changed several times. The office was abolished before the 2022 general election, leaving the States Assembly made up of deputies and connétables. In March 2025, the States Assembly approved the reintroduction of senators for the 2026 election, with nine senators elected island-wide and one deputy seat removed from each of the nine deputy constituencies.

=== Deputies ===
Deputies are elected from constituencies. Since the 2026 Jersey general election, there have been 28 deputies elected from single- and multi-member constituencies. Voters may cast as many votes for deputy as there are deputy seats in their constituency; for example, voters in St Helier Central could select up to four candidates at the 2026 election.

== Past elections ==
- 1993 Jersey general election
- 1996 Jersey general election
- 1999 Jersey general election
- 2002 Jersey general election
- 2005 Jersey general election
- 2008 Jersey general election
- 2011 Jersey general election
- 2014 Jersey general election
- 2018 Jersey general election
- 2022 Jersey general election
- 2026 Jersey general election

=== By-elections ===
For senators:

- 1999 Jersey by-elections
- 2003 Jersey by-elections
- 2004 Jersey by-elections
- 2010 Jersey by-elections
- 2016 Jersey by-election

For deputies:

- 1999 Jersey by-elections
- 2000 Jersey by-elections
- 2014 Jersey by-elections

== Parish and local elections ==
Jersey's 12 parishes form the island's system of local administration. Each parish is headed by a connétable (or "constable"), who is elected as a member of the States Assembly and also acts as head of the parish.

The Elections (Jersey) Law 2002 distinguishes between public elections and parish elections. Public elections are for senator, deputy or connétable, while parish elections are for centeniers and procureurs du bien public.

Procureurs du bien public and centeniers are elected at parish level for three-year terms of office.

Members of the Honorary Police are also elected in the parishes. The Honorary Police comprises centeniers, vingteniers and constable's officers, who take an oath before the Royal Court

Parish assemblies also elect local officeholders such as members of the roads committee and roads inspectors. The roads committee is responsible for parish by-roads, while roads inspectors are chosen for each vingtaine or cueillette.

== Electoral register ==
Jersey introduced automatic voter registration in March 2026. The system automatically adds eligible islanders to the electoral register using information from the Government of Jersey's central People Directory, including social security contribution records.

Those entitled to vote must be

- at least 16 years old (lowered from 18 in 2008);

and either

1. lived in Jersey for 12 months on election day,
2. lived in Jersey for six months on election day plus previous periods of residence totalling five years.

The right to vote is determined by residency, not citizenship, and voters do not have to be British citizens.

The first general election held after the introduction of automatic voter registration was the 2026 Jersey general election. Analysis by the Policy Centre Jersey estimated turnout at 32%, down from 42% in 2022, although the number of people who cast a vote increased from 25,334 to 27,133. The analysis attributed the lower turnout percentage predominantly to the larger electoral roll created by automatic registration.

On 4 July 2007, the States of Jersey voted to reduce voting age to 16. The law was brought into force on 12 March 2008, with effect from 1 April 2008, allowing 16- and 17-year-old voters to register in time for the 2008 elections.

The first public election by secret ballot was held on 1 December 1891, following the passing of a law providing for secret ballots earlier that year. Under the Elections (Jersey) Law 2002, every public election or parish election poll is conducted by secret ballot.

== Indirect elections ==
Since the 1948 constitutional reforms, Jurats are elected by electoral college rather than by Islandwide vote.

== See also ==
- Politics of Jersey
- Political parties in Jersey
- States Assembly
- Parishes of Jersey
- Electoral system
