= Pretre =

Pretre or Prêtre, meaning priest in French, may refer to:

- Georges Prêtre (1924-2017), a French conductor
- Jean-Gabriel Prêtre (1768-1849), Swiss-French natural history painter
  - Amazone De Pretre, another name for the red-spectacled amazon, a parrot species, named for the painter
- John McDonell (Le Prêtre) (1768–1850), a soldier, judge and political figure in Upper Canada
- Sebastien Le Pretre de Vauban (1633–1707), a Marshal of France and the foremost military engineer of his age
- Vingtaine de Bas du Mont au Prêtre, one of the five vingtaines of St. Helier Parish on the Channel Island of Jersey
- Vingtaine de Haut du Mont au Prêtre, one of the five vingtaines of St. Helier Parish on the Channel Island of Jersey
- Prêtre Martin, a character who serves the Mass alone to himself

== See also ==
- Pretrei (disambiguation)
