= Channel Island English =

Dialects specific to the Archipelago in the Channel that separates England and France

- Region: Channel Islands
- Ethnicity: Channel Islanders
- Language family: Indo-European: Germanic; West Germanic; Ingvaeonic; Anglo-Frisian; Anglic; English; European English; British English; Channel Island English
- Dialects: Alderney; Guernsey; Jersey
- Writing system: Latin (English alphabet)

Language codes
- ISO 639-3: –
- Glottolog: None

Channel Island English refers to Alderney English, Guernsey English, and Jersey English and similar dialects of English found in the other Channel Islands.

== Variations ==
=== Alderney English ===
Alderney English is the variety of English spoken by some residents of Alderney. It is questionable whether this is a separate dialect: due to Alderney's small size and high rate of immigration and emigration, particularly to/from nearby Guernsey and the UK, a high proportion of the population speaks the English of their place of origin, while many people who have been educated in Guernsey in their youth have acquired a way of speaking that is close to Guernsey English.

Thus Alderney English currently corresponds quite closely to standard English, with a tendency towards mild archaism due to the population demographic in which the over-50s are the largest group.

Its distinguishing feature is a small but significant number of loan words from Guernésiais (the variety of Norman spoken on the neighbouring island of Guernsey), Legal French (which was the language of legislation before the Second World War) and a very much smaller number of words that have come down from Auregnais (now a dead language, it is no longer certain whether there are any rememberers still alive).

An example of a word used in Alderney that appears neither in standard English nor in Guernsey English is "Impôt" (meaning 'rubbish tip/recycling centre' and not 'tax/imposition' as elsewhere). In addition there is an idiosyncratic pronunciation of certain local surnames, "Dupont" as French pronunciation: [dipõ] and "Simon" as [symõ], rather than the standard Parisian pronunciation. Any remainder of the historic influence of Auregnais on Alderney English is very hard to discern, since Guernésiais and Auregnais differed only slightly.

=== Guernsey English ===
Guernsey English is the dialect of English spoken in Guernsey, distinguished by having considerable influence from Guernésiais, the variety of Norman indigenous to Guernsey.

The dialect contains terms such as buncho (from Dgèrnésiais: bond d'tchu) for the English "somersault"; "it picks" instead of "it stings", from the Guernsey equivalent of the French "ça pique"; "chirry" for "goodbye"; and "Budlo Night" instead of Bonfire Night on 5 November.

Often Guernsey people will add the word "Eh" to the end of a sentence, inferring a general agreement that something is held to be true or correct. It can also be used in the context of asking a question or seeking reassurance that what was said is correct if it is believed to be a contentious issue.

=== Jersey English ===
Jersey English is a dialect of English spoken in Jersey, Channel Islands, the accent of which has been likened to that of South African English. It is influenced by the use of Jèrriais and Jersey Legal French.

==== Influence of Jersey Legal French on Jersey English ====
Jersey English has imported a number of Jersey Legal French titles and terminology. Many of these, in turn, derive from Jèrriais. The following are examples likely to be encountered in daily life and in news reports in Jersey:

- rapporteur
- en défaut (in default, i.e. late for a meeting)
- en désastre
- au greffe
- greffier (clerk-of-court or the States)
- bâtonnier (lawyer in charge of bar, particularly for legal aid)
- mandataire
- autorisé (returning officer at elections, or other functions)
- projet (parliamentary bill)
- vraic
- côtil
- temps passé (time past)
- vin d'honneur (municipal or official reception)
- centenier
- vingtenier
- chef de police (senior centenier)
- branchage (pronounced in English as the Jèrriais cognate even though spelt in the French manner - trimming hedges and verges on property border; also used jocularly for a haircut)
- seigneur (feudal lord of the manor)

== Phonology ==
=== Vowels ===
Channel Islands English vowels
Lexical set	Channel Islands English	Examples
KIT	[i ~ ï]	bid, pit
DRESS	[ɛ ~ ɛ̈]	bed, pet
TRAP	[æ]	bad, pat
LOT	[ɒ~ɒ̈]	cot, bother, off
CLOTH	[ɒ~ɒ̈]	cot, bother, off
STRUT	[ɔ~ʌ]	bud, putt
FOOT	[ʊ]	good, foot, put
BATH	[ɑː~ɑ̟ː]	grass, father, farm
PALM	[ɑː~ɑ̟ː]	grass, father, farm
START	[ɑː~ɑ̟ː]	grass, father, farm
NURSE	[ɜː~əː]	bird, herd, furry
FLEECE	[iː~ɪi]	bead, peat
FACE	[eɪ~e̞ɪ]	bay, hey, fate
THOUGHT	[ɔː~oː]	caught, born, more
NORTH	[ɔː~oː]	caught, born, more
FORCE	[ɔː~oː]	caught, born, more
GOAT	[ɔʊ~əʊ]	road, stone, toe
GOOSE	[uː~ʉː]	booed, food
PRICE	[ɒɪ~ɑɪ~ʌɪ]	buy, write
CHOICE	[ɔɪ~oɪ]	boy, voice
MOUTH	[aʊ]	how, mouse
NEAR	[ɪə~iə]	beer, fear
SQUARE	[ɛə~ɛː]	bear, hair
CURE	[ʊə]	fury, pure, rural
Reduced vowels
LETTER	[ə~œ]	runner, butter
COMMA	[ə]	Rosa, cuppa

=== Consonants ===
- H-drops and intrusive H leading to sentences like: “My mother was very hill and I was the heldest, and I stayed to 'elp my mother.”
- Ing as /ɪn/ or /ɪŋ/
- R tends to be uvular in the island of Sark, and trilled throughout the archipelago.
- Medial yod often appears after an initial voiced consonant such as /ˈɡjɑːdn/
- /t/ and /d/ are dental and unaspirated.
- Interference from the Norman Languages caused their intonation and word stress to be different sometimes, like edu'cated, Liver'pool and rail'way.

== Morphosyntax ==
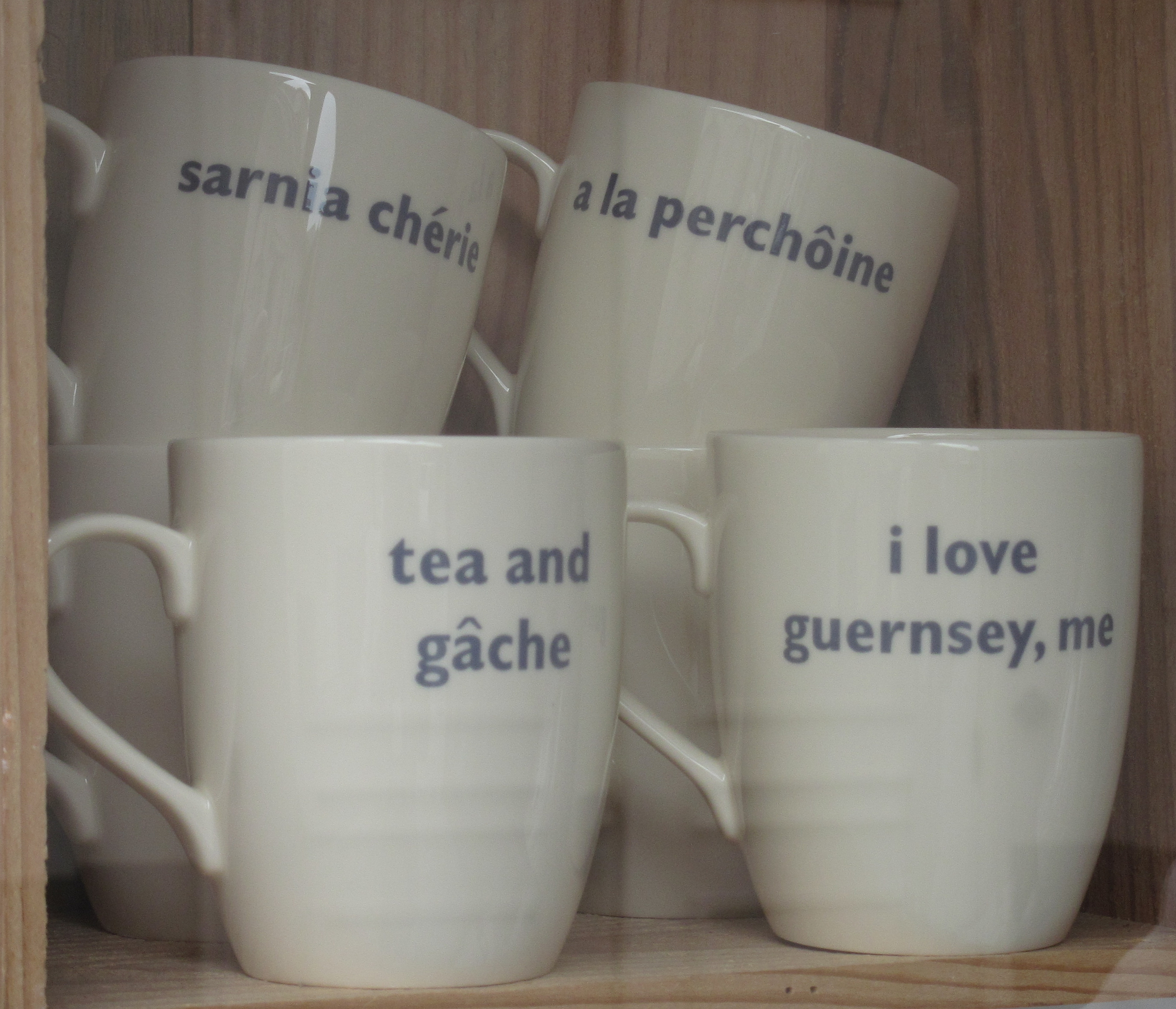
"I love Guernsey, me" - this slogan on a cup demonstrates the typical use of the emphatic pronoun

- The Norman Influence is more clearly demonstrable in Channel Island English morphosyntax than in its phonology.

Examples of structures used by people in the Channel Islands are:

- “There's ten years I am a farmer” for “I've been a farmer for ten years.”
- “Me, I don't want to go” or “I don't want to go, me.”
- “That's the one, eh?” Eh for “isn't it?”, “aren't they?”, “don't you think?”, or else.
- “There's two castles there” for “There are two castles there.”
- “... and the teacher, she was angry, eh.” (use of emphatic personal pronoun.)

== See also ==
- Ebenezer Le Page
