= Referendums in Jersey =

Referendums in Jersey are provided for by the Referendums (Jersey) Law 2017. A lead campaign is limited to spending £2,800 for a particular referendum, and a further £0.11 for each person entitled to vote in that referendum. It is illegal to keep anonymous donations, which must be sent to the Treasurer of the States to be donated to charity.

A two-round referendum was held in 2013 on electoral reform; the outcome of which was that St Helier should be divided into two districts, and other parishes combined in order to improve proportionality within the island's electoral system.

Another referendum was held in 2014 on whether Connétables should continue to be permitted to sit in the States automatically as members. Their continued automatic membership was approved by 62% of voters.

Residents of Jersey are not usually permitted to vote in referendums held in the United Kingdom, notably the EU referendum in 2016, unless they are eligible due to past residence there.
