= Vingtaine du Mont Cochon =

Vingtaine in Saint Helier, Jersey

Vingtaine du Mont Cochon Mont Cochon
- Vingtaine
- Location within Jersey Location within Channel Islands
- Coordinates: 49°12′09″N 2°07′46″W
- Country: Jersey
- Parish: Saint Helier

Population (January 1, 2021)
  - Total: 1,989
- Time zone: UTC+00:00
- Postal code: JE4–8PA

https://opendata.gov.je/dataset/2021-census/resource/8a69b1b1-2675-44a1-93e4-a5b346959032?view_id=47828236-f6fb-4298-b6c6-1834be63560a

Vingtaine du Mont Cochon is one of the six vingtaines of the parish of St. Helier, in the Channel Island of Jersey. It is close to St Lawrence.

== Elected officials ==
=== National elections ===
With the Vingtaine du Mont à l'Abbé and the Vingtaine de Haut du Mont au Prêtre, which forms District St Helier North the electors return four deputies to the States of Jersey.

=== Municipal elections ===
The parish assembly of St Helier elects one vingtenier, three constable's officers and two roads inspectors to represent the vingtaine for a term of three years.
