= Vingtaine du Mont à l'Abbé =

Vingtaine in Saint Helier, Jersey

Vingtaine du Mont a l'Abbe Mont a l'Abbe
- Vingtaine
- Location within Jersey Location within Channel Islands
- Coordinates: 49°12′07″N 2°06′50″W
- Country: Jersey
- Parish: Saint Helier

Population (January 1, 2021)
  - Total: 7,207
- Time zone: UTC+00:00
- Postal code: JE4–8PA

https://opendata.gov.je/dataset/2021-census/resource/8a69b1b1-2675-44a1-93e4-a5b346959032?view_id=47828236-f6fb-4298-b6c6-1834be63560a

The Vingtaine du Mont à l'Abbé is one of six vingtaines of the parish of Saint Helier in the Channel Island of Jersey.

== Elected officials ==
Two vingteniers, three constable's officers and two roads inspectors are elected for three years term to represent this vingtaine.

The current serving vingtenier is Merces Pereira.

Roads inspectors are Edward Lindsey and Darius Pearce.

There are currently three vacancies for constable's officers in this vingtaine.

Along with the Vingtaine du Mont Cochon and the Vingtaine de Haut du Mont au Prêtre it forms District St Helier North and elects 4 Deputies to the States of Jersey.
