= States of Jersey Police =

Agency overview
- Formed: 1951

Jurisdictional structure
- Operations jurisdiction: Jersey
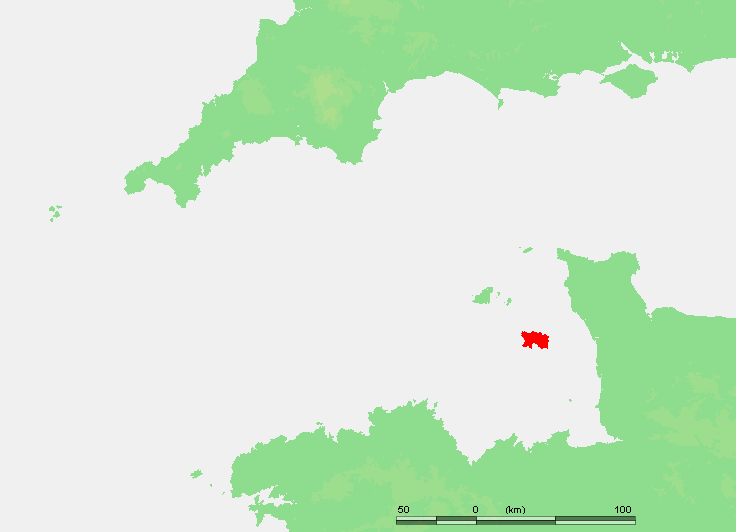
- States of Jersey Police area in red
- Area: 119.4 km^{2} (46.1 sq mi)
- Population: 104,200
- General nature: Civilian police

Operational structure
- Headquarters: Saint Helier
- Sworn members: 306
- Agency executive: Robin Smith, Chief Officer
- Uniformed Shifts: 5

Facilities
- Stations: 2

Website
- www.jersey.police.je

The States of Jersey Police or States Police are a paid police force in the Bailiwick of Jersey. Alongside the unpaid Honorary Police, the States Police make up the 13 official police forces on the island, though the States Police are the only force to be paid and to operate island-wide. The States Police was established in its current form by the Police Force (Jersey) Law, 1974 and consists of around 240 officers.

This was some 130 years after the need for a full-time force was identified. A body of paid and uniformed town police was set up in Saint Helier in 1854, which became the nucleus of the Paid Police established to operate Island-wide in 1951 by the Paid Police Force (Jersey) Law. The Paid Police was renamed the States of Jersey Police in 1960.

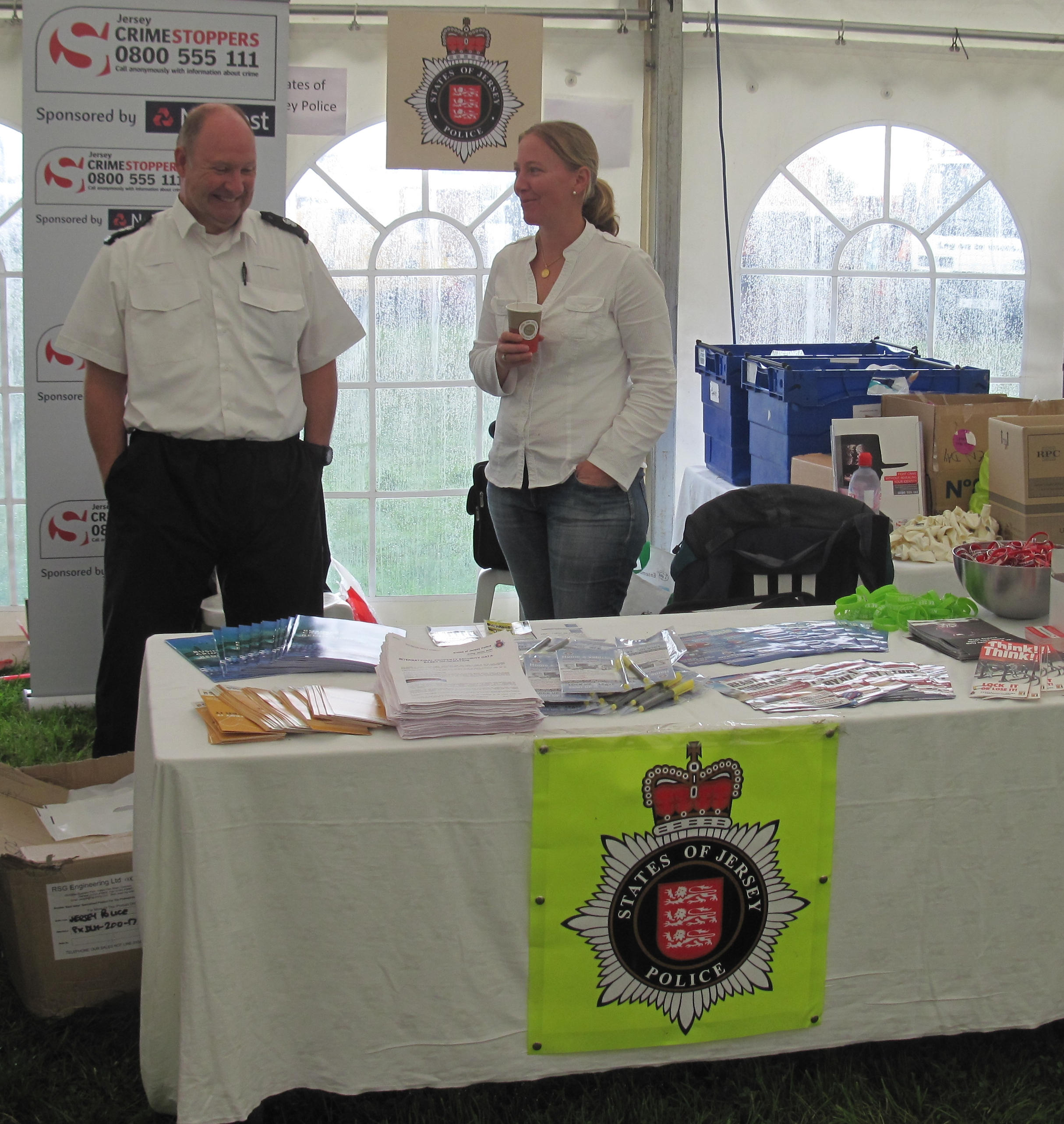
States of Jersey Police community outreach: a crime prevention information stand at the 2012 West Show

The States of Jersey Police are the only officers with Island-wide powers and provide a professional response to all serious crimes on the Island. Under a memorandum of understanding with the twelve parish forces the latter routinely handle minor matters and traffic control, but Centeniers remain the only officers able to bring charges.

The fictional Bureau des Étrangers department of the States of Jersey Police featured in the British TV series Bergerac.

== History ==
The States Police's origin dates to 1853 as a small group of uniformed officers. This was a combined police force and fire service, whose offices were within the St Helier Town Hall, as they only served the town.

In the 1890s, this became more standardised as the St Helier Paid Police Force were established. They began to serve other parishes in the 1930s.

The paid police remained a parish-run body until 1952, when the States of Jersey Police were established on 24 May with 64 officers.

In 2013, plans to build a new headquarters building were approved. The new building which supersedes the old headquarters located in Rouge Bouillon, was opened on 7 March 2017, and sits on land which was occupied by a part of Green Street car park.

== Role ==
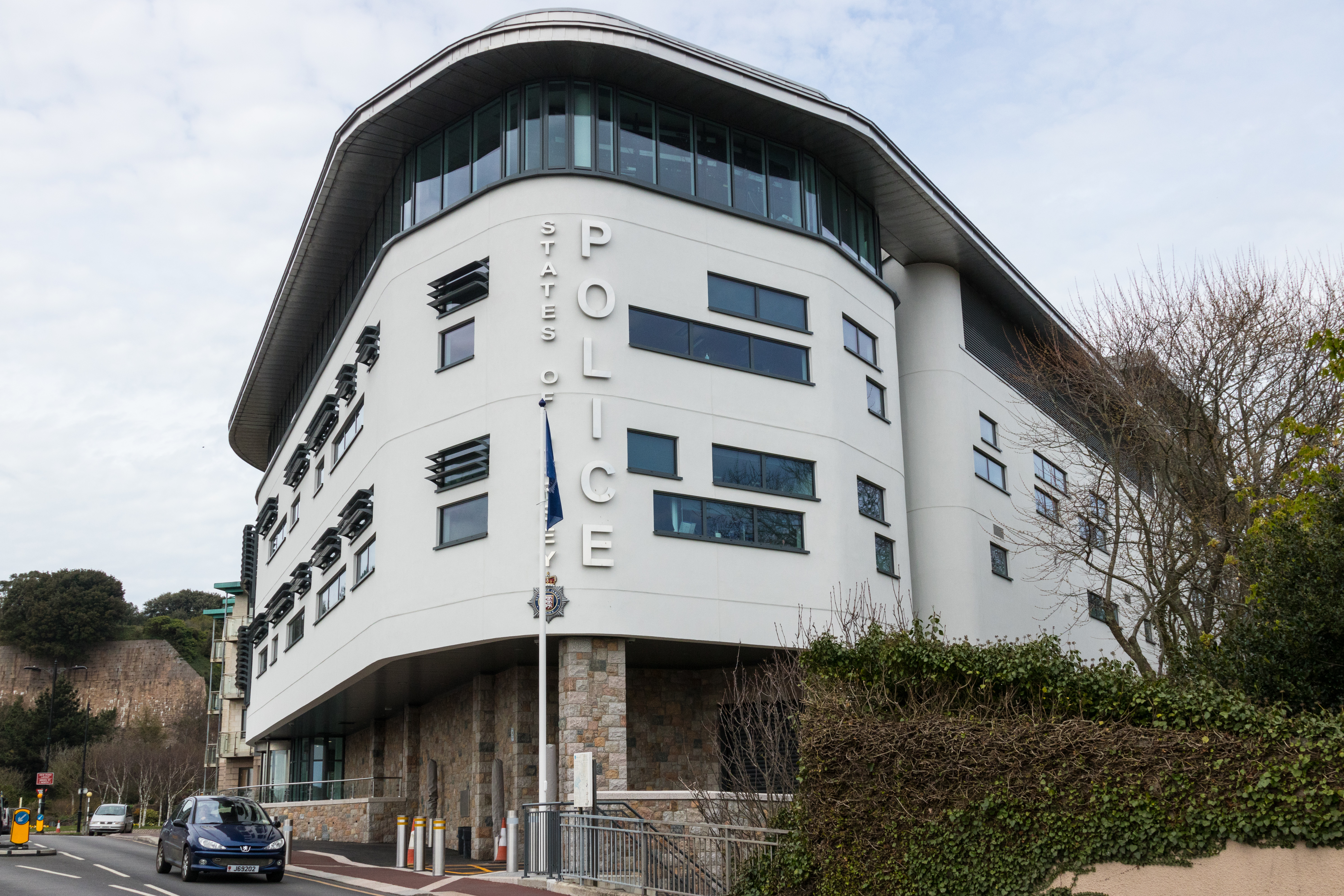
The States of Jersey Police HQ on La Route du Fort in St. Helier.

Jersey's status as a self-governing Crown Dependency outside the United Kingdom creates a unique environment for policing compared to most British forces. The States Police must therefore take on roles which may be taken on by other agencies for a UK force.

The force's Joint Financial Crimes Unit works with global policing agencies to combat money laundering and terrorist financing.

== Notable investigations ==
=== Child services abuse scandal ===
An investigation into allegations of historical child abuse had begun in 2006. Several sites on the grounds of Haut de la Garenne, a former children's home, were excavated in 2008, and finds of human remains and other items were announced amid sensational international publicity. In September 2008, Detective Superintendent Mick Gradwell of Lancashire Police took over as Senior Investigating Officer in the abuse enquiry. In August 2008, David Warcup, Deputy Chief Constable of Northumbria Police, took over as Deputy Chief Officer of the States of Jersey Police. The new team launched a review of the investigation to date, and subsequently in November 2008, Warcup expressed "much regret" that misleading information had been released throughout the enquiry and that there was "no evidence" of any child murders at Haut de la Garenne.

Detective Superintendent Gradwell retired in August 2009 at the end of his contract and returned to the UK. On retiring, he described the investigation before the time he took over as a "poorly managed mess" and, in particular, the decision to excavate at Haut de la Garenne as being without justification and "a complete and total waste of public money, time and effort".

As a result of the wider investigation, disregarding the controversial excavations at Haut de la Garenne, charges were brought against three individuals, and convictions were obtained in court in 2009.

=== Suspension of Graham Power ===
The Chief Officer of the States of Jersey Police, Graham Power, was suspended in November 2008 pending an inquiry into his handling of the historic abuse inquiry, in the wake of the public withdrawal by police of claims of evidence.

In August 2009, it was announced that Power, still on suspension but contesting his suspension through legal process, had been suspended again in relation to the keeping of secret files on politicians, an affair unrelated to the historic abuse inquiry.

Power later retired and was replaced in the interim by David Warcup, who subsequently announced his own departure in July 2010.

== Ranks ==
States of Jersey Police ranks and insignia
Rank	Chief officer	Deputy chief officer	Superintendent	Chief inspector	Inspector	Sergeant	Constable
Epaulette insignia							

== See also ==
- Law of Jersey
- Courts of Jersey
- Bailiff of Jersey
- Jersey Honorary Police
- List of law enforcement agencies in the United Kingdom, Crown Dependencies and British Overseas Territories
