= Jersey French =

Jersey French may refer to:

- Jersey Legal French
- Jèrriais
