= Jersey Legal French =

French dialect formerly used administratively in Jersey

- français de jersey
- Native speakers: None
- Language family: Indo-European: Italic; Latino-Faliscan; Latinic; Romance; Italo-Western; Western; Gallo-Iberian?; Gallo-Romance; Gallo-Rhaetian?; Arpitan–Oïl; Oïl; Francien zone; French; Jersey Legal French
- Early forms: Old Latin: Vulgar Latin; Proto-Romance; Old Gallo-Romance; Old French; Middle French

Official status
- Official language in: Jersey

Language codes
- ISO 639-3: –
- Glottolog: None
- IETF: fr-JE

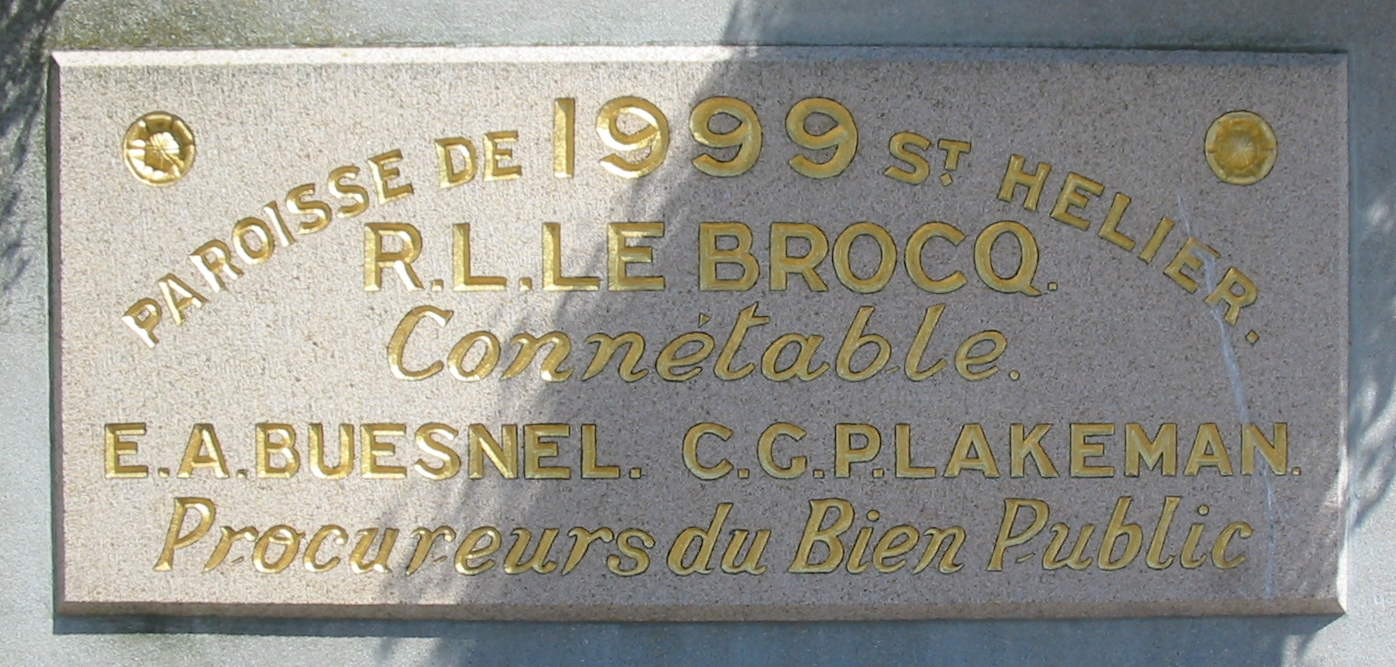
This official stone which marks the inauguration of a municipal office in 1999 bears the names of the Connétable and the Procureurs du Bien Public of Saint Helier.

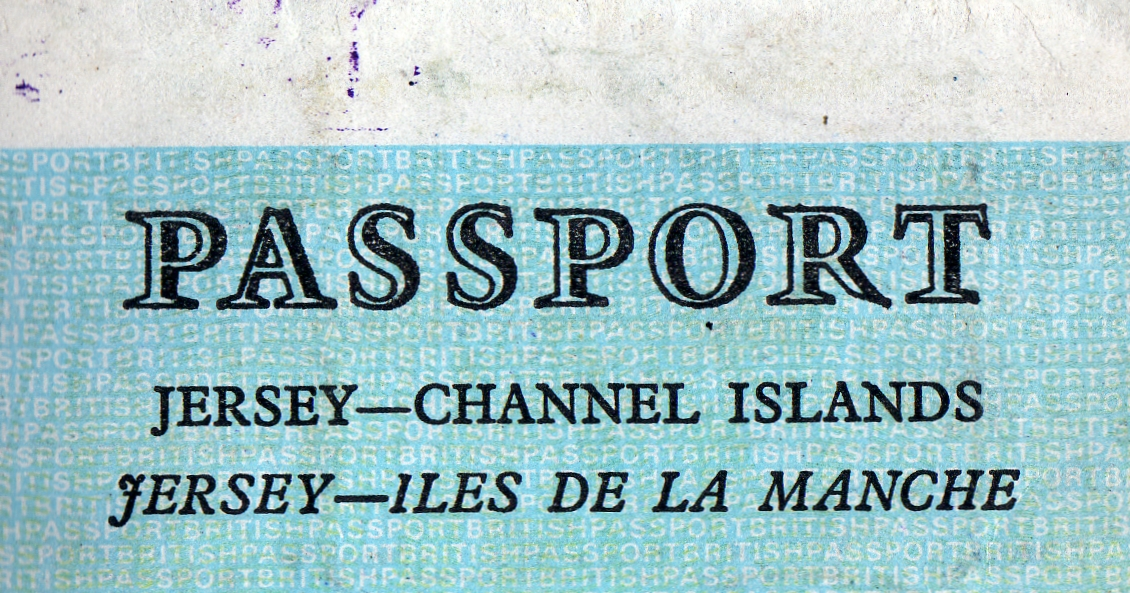
Îles de la Manche (Channel Islands) used in a Jersey passport

Jersey Legal French, also known as Jersey French (French: français de Jersey), was the official dialect of French used administratively in Jersey. Since the anglicisation of the island, it survives as a written language for some laws, contracts, and other documents. Jersey's parliament, the States of Jersey, is part of the Assemblée parlementaire de la Francophonie. The use of the English language has been allowed in legislative debates since 2 February 1900; the current use of French in the States of Jersey is generally restricted to certain limited official state functions and formalities (prayers, ceremonies, formulae).

The French of Jersey differs little from that of France. It is characterised by several terms particular to Jersey administration and a few expressions imported from English and Norman.

Jersey Legal French is not to be confused with Jèrriais, a variety of the Norman language also called Jersey Norman French. By common custom and usage, the most spoken languages of Jersey in present times are the English language and Jèrriais.

== List of distinguishing features ==
It is notable that the local term for the archipelago is îles de la Manche ('Channel Islands') – îles anglo-normandes ('Anglo-Norman Islands') is a somewhat recent invention in continental French.

As in Swiss French and Belgian French, the numbers 70 and 90 are septante and nonante, respectively, not soixante-dix and quatre-vingt-dix (compare the use of nénante for 90 in Jèrriais).

Initial capital letters are commonly used in writing the names of the days of the week and months of the year.

Messire is used for the title of knighthood; for example, the former Bailiff of Jersey, Sir Philip Bailhache, is correctly addressed in French as Messire Philip Bailhache.

== Finance ==
| Jersey Legal French | French | English |
|---|---|---|
| barguin | affaire | bargain |
| chelin | chelin or shilling | shilling |
| louis | livre | pound |
| en désastre | en banqueroute | bankrupt |
| impôts | droits de régie | customs and excise duties |
| principal | contribuable du rât | principal (ratepayer of a certain value) |
| quartier | unité de valeur de propriété foncière | quarter (unit of ratable value) |
| rât paroissial | taxe foncière | parish rate |
| taxe sur le revenu | impôt sur le revenu | income tax |
| taxer le rât | voter la taxe foncière (lors d'une assemblée de paroisse) | set the rate (by vote at a parish assembly) |

== Agriculture ==
| Jersey Legal French | French | English |
|---|---|---|
| bannelais | | road sweepings (used for fertiliser) |
| charrière | | passage between rocks used for vraicing (collecting seaweed for fertiliser) |
| fossé | haie | hedge |
| hèche | barrière | gate |
| heurif | tôt | early (e.g. potatoes) |
| vraic | varech | seaweed (used for fertiliser) |

== Administration ==
| Jersey Legal French | French | English |
|---|---|---|
| mandataire | | voting representative of a ratepaying company |
| perquage | chemin de sanctuaire | (so-called) sanctuary path |
| procureur du bien public | | elected attorney (legal and financial representative) of a Parish |
| rapporteur | porte-parole | spokesperson (of committee) |
| visite du branchage | | inspection of roads |
| visite royale | | inspection of a parish by the Royal Court |
| vingtaine | | administrative division of a parish |
| vingtenier | | Honorary Police officer |
| voyeur | témoin assermenté | sworn witness |
| centenier | | senior Honorary Police officer |
| écrivain | notaire | solicitor |
| connétable | maire | constable (elected head of parish) |
| deputé-bailli | bailli adjoint | deputy bailiff |
| juré-justicier | juge | (elected) judge |
| levée de corps | enquête judiciaire | inquest |
| lier à la paix | relâcher sous condition | bind over to keep the peace |
| loger au greffe | déposer (un projet de loi) | lodge (table) a bill etc. |

== Real estate ==
| Jersey Legal French | French | English |
|---|---|---|
| icelle borne | ladite borne | the said boundary stone |
| corps de bien fonds | parcelle de bien-fonds | Latin: corpus fundi |
| côtil | | steeply sloping field or other land |
| côtière | côté d'un édifice où le mur n'est pas en pignon | external wall of building other than gable end |
| becquet de terre | champ de terre | parcel of land |
| borne | borne (établie) | (established) boundary stone |
| bail à fin d'héritage | vente (de propriété foncière) | sale |
| bail à termage | bail (de propriété foncière) | lease |
| issues | | strip of land alongside road |
| lisière | bande de terrain | strip of land |
| pierre ou devise | borne (à établir) | boundary stone (newly established) |
| au pourportant | de la même étendue | co-extensive |
| relief | | strip of land on other side of wall or hedge |

== Influence on Jersey English ==
Jersey English has imported a number of Jersey Legal French titles and terminology. Many of these, in turn, derive from Jèrriais. The following are examples likely to be encountered in daily life and in news reports in Jersey: rapporteur, en défaut (in default, i.e. late for a meeting), en désastre, au greffe, greffier (clerk to court or the States), bâtonnier (lawyer in charge of bar, particularly for legal aid), mandataire, autorisé (returning officer at elections, or other functions), projet (parliamentary bill), vraic, côtil, temps passé (time past), vin d'honneur (municipal or official reception), centenier, vingtenier, chef de police (senior centenier), Ministre Desservant, branchage (pronounced in English as the Jèrriais cognate even though spelt in the French manner – trimming hedges and verges on property border; also used jocularly for a haircut), seigneur (feudal lord of the manor).
