= Vingtaine du Rouge Bouillon =

Vingtaine du Rouge Bouillon Rouge Bouillon
- Vingtaine
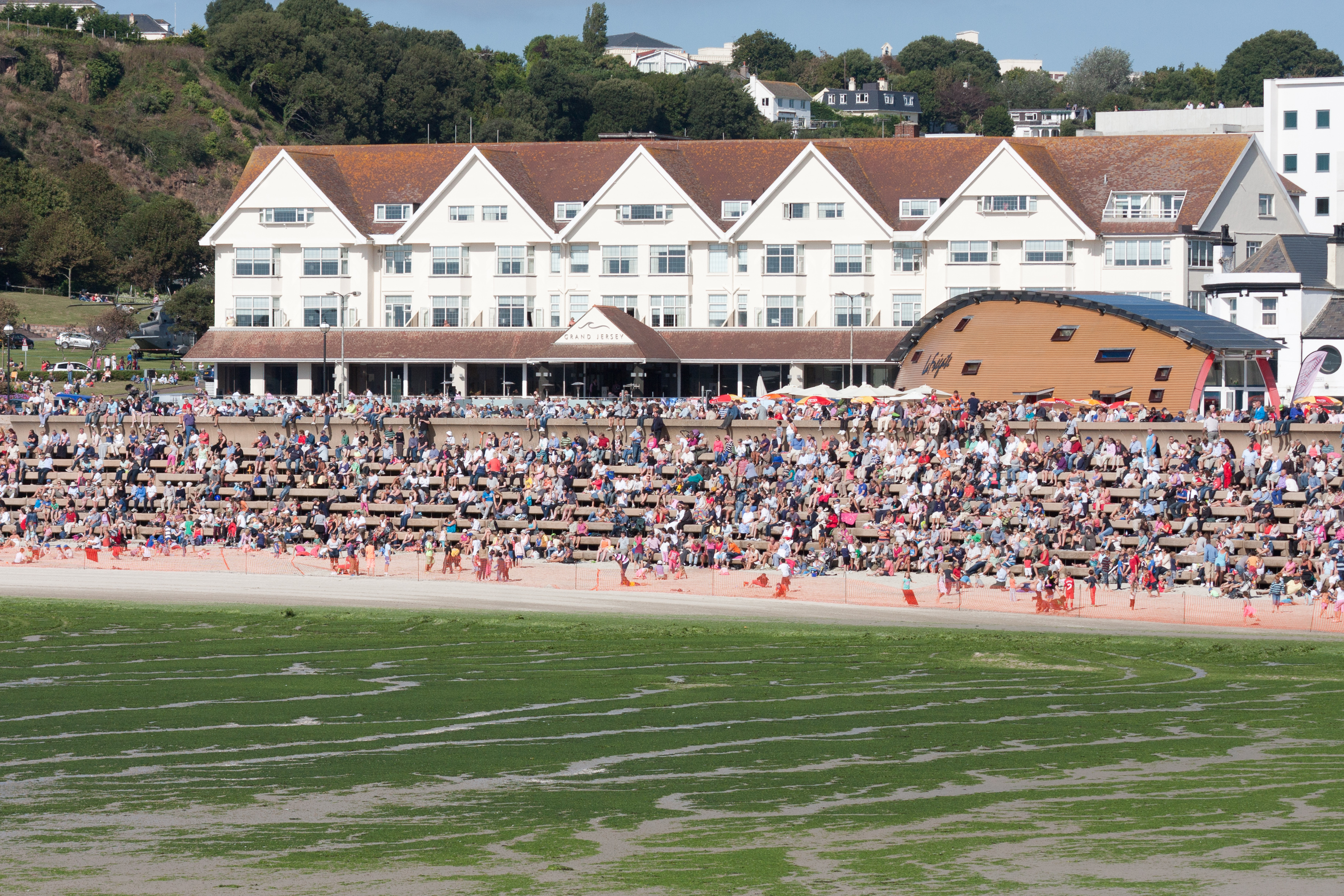
- The Grand Hotel and Esplanade at West Park

- Location within Jersey Location within Channel Islands
- Coordinates: 49°11′33″N 2°06′30″W
- Country: Jersey
- Parish: Saint Helier

Population (January 1, 2021)
  - Total: 6,726
- Time zone: UTC+00:00
- Postal code: JE4–8PA

https://opendata.gov.je/dataset/2021-census/resource/8a69b1b1-2675-44a1-93e4-a5b346959032?view_id=47828236-f6fb-4298-b6c6-1834be63560a

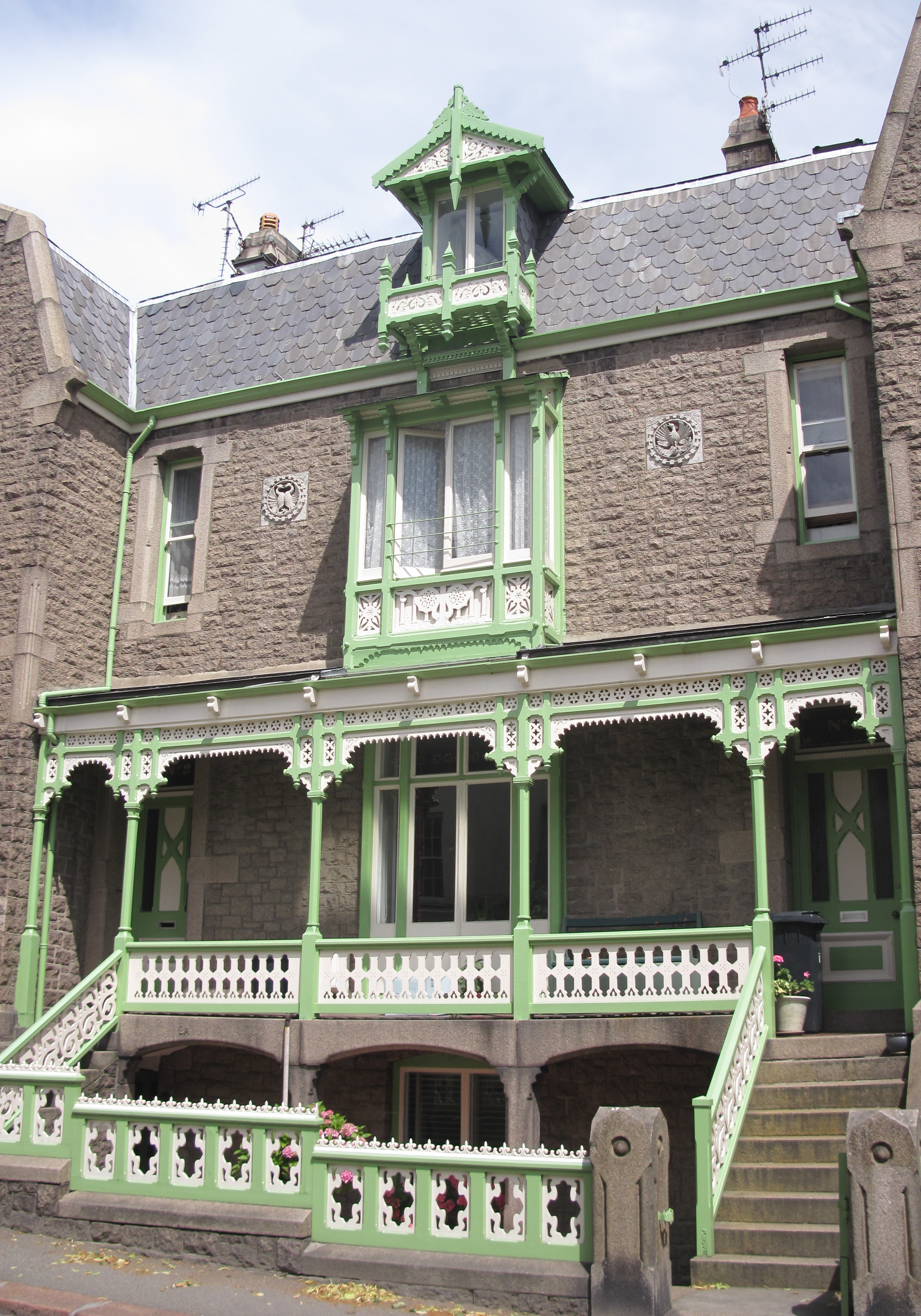
A building on Queen's Road.

Vingtaine du Rouge Bouillon is one of the six vingtaines of St Helier in Jersey, Channel Islands.

The vingtaine is named after the main road through the centre of it, known as Rouge Boullion. The vingtaine also has a number of landmarks, such as the Parade, the Hospital and most of People's Park.

== Elected officials ==
=== Island elections ===
With the Vingtaine de Bas du Mont au Prêtre this vingtaine forms District St Helier Central which return five deputies to the States of Jersey.

=== Parish elections ===
The parish assembly of St Helier elects one vingtenier, three constable's officers and two roads inspectors to represent the vingtaine for a term of three years.
