= Roads committee =

Highway authority on the island of Jersey

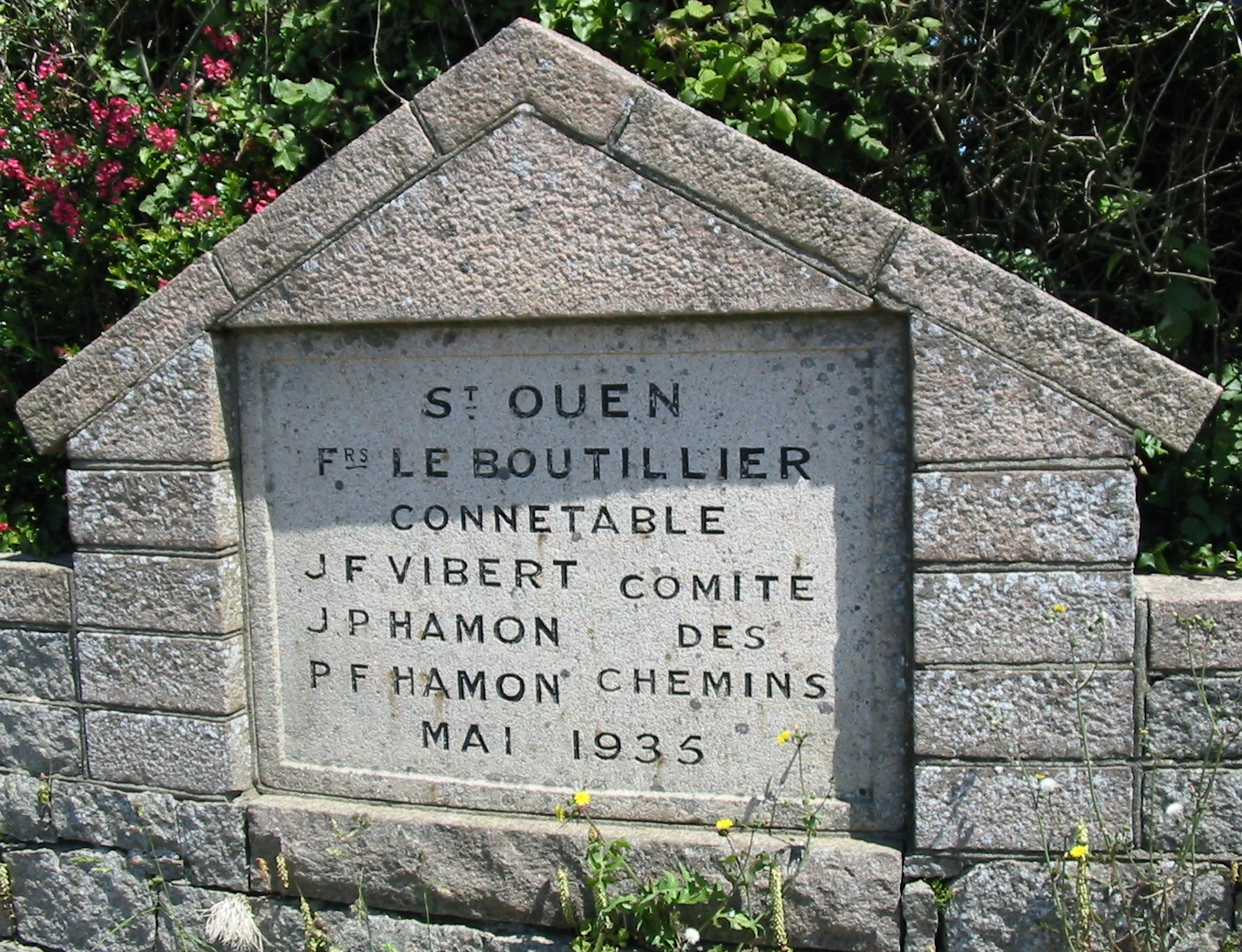
Road marker stone in Saint Ouen dated 1935 inscribed with the names of the Roads Committee

In Jersey, a roads committee (French: comité des chemins) is the highway authority for parish roads in each parish.

In accordance with the Loi (1914) sur la Voirie, the roads committee:

- superintends the repair and maintenance of by-roads in the parish
- establishes boundary stones
- issues Choses Publiques licenses
- examines planning applications that fall within its responsibilities
- supervises refuse collection
- adjudicates fines during the visite du branchage
- proposes new road names, as may be necessary, for approval by the parish assembly.

The connétable presides over the roads committee which also includes the rector and three principals of the parish (or five principals, for St Helier) elected for a term of three years by the parish assembly. Instructions are passed to roads inspectors whose duty it is to ensure that the repairs are carried out.

St. Helier has a larger Roads Committee which also undertakes additional non-statutory responsibilities with regard to parks and other matters. It acts, in the absence of a municipal council, as an advisory body to the connétable. By convention, the two procureurs du bien public of St. Helier attend meetings of the Roads Committee, but cannot vote.
