= 2003 Jersey by-elections =

== Senator ==
A by election for a Senator took place on February 26, 2003 after the retirement of Senator Ann Bailhache.

Candidate	Votes	%
Ted Vibert	3,983	32.05
Alastair Layzell	3,712	29.87
Ian MacFirbhisigh	2,487	20.01
Geno Gouveia	1,761	14.17
Harry Cole	486	3.91
Total	12,429	100.00
Valid votes	12,429	98.89
Invalid/blank votes	139	1.11
Total votes	12,568	100.00
Registered voters/turnout	47,825	26.28

== Grouville Constable ==
A by election for the Grouville Constable took place on September 17, 2003 following the resignation of Frank Amy due to ill-health.

Candidate	Votes	%
Dan Murphy	851	62.76
Bruce Willing	505	37.24
Total	1,356	100.00
Valid votes	1,356	100.00
Invalid/blank votes	0	0.00
Total votes	1,356	100.00
Registered voters/turnout	2,892	46.89
