= 2004 Jersey by-elections =

A by-election for a Senator to the States Assembly of Jersey was held on 24 March 2004, following the resignation of Christopher Lakeman.

Candidate	Votes	%
Richard Shenton	7,144	62.78
Juliette Gallichan	1,715	15.07
Robert Weston	1,284	11.28
Kevin Lewis	724	6.36
Robert Brown	264	2.32
Terry Coutanche	249	2.19
Total	11,380	100.00
Valid votes	11,380	99.14
Invalid/blank votes	99	0.86
Total votes	11,479	100.00
Registered voters/turnout		24.7
