= 2013 Jersey electoral reform referendum =

24 April 2013

First round
Option A	39.59%
Option B	40.93%
Option C	19.48%
Voter turnout was 26.24%

Second round
Option A	45.02%
Option B	54.98%
Voter turnout was 26.24%

A referendum on electoral reform was held on Jersey on 24 April 2013. Voters were offered three choices for a future electoral system, and will be asked to rank them in order of preference. Option B was the most preferred option, receiving 41% of votes in the first round, and 55% after second preferences were counted. Voter turnout was just 26%, and the proposed reforms were later rejected by the States.

== Background ==
In 2012 an Electoral Commission was set up to examine potential reforms to the electoral system after a campaign by former States deputy Daniel Wimberly. The then-current system provided for a 51-seat States, with constituency size ranging from 1,200 to 98,000 residents. The States had three types of elected members; 29 deputies elected in constituencies of between 1,200 and 3,000 residents; constables who head the 12 parishes of Jersey; and 10 senators elected on an island-wide basis.

The three options put to voters were:

Option	Constables	Deputies	Senators	Total members	Notes
A	0	42	0	42	Deputies would be elected in six 7-member constituencies
B	12	30	0	42	Deputies would be elected in six 5-member constituencies
C	12	29	8	49	Deputies would be elected in constituencies of varying sizes

However, Wimberly was unhappy with the proposals, claiming that the options presented did not make the changes people wanted, as they would still not be able to choose their government.

== Electoral system ==
Voters were asked to rank their preferences. If no option received over 50% of the vote, the second preferences of ballots for the third-placed option would be tallied and added to the totals of those in first and second place. Voters had to be registered by 3 April.

== Campaign ==
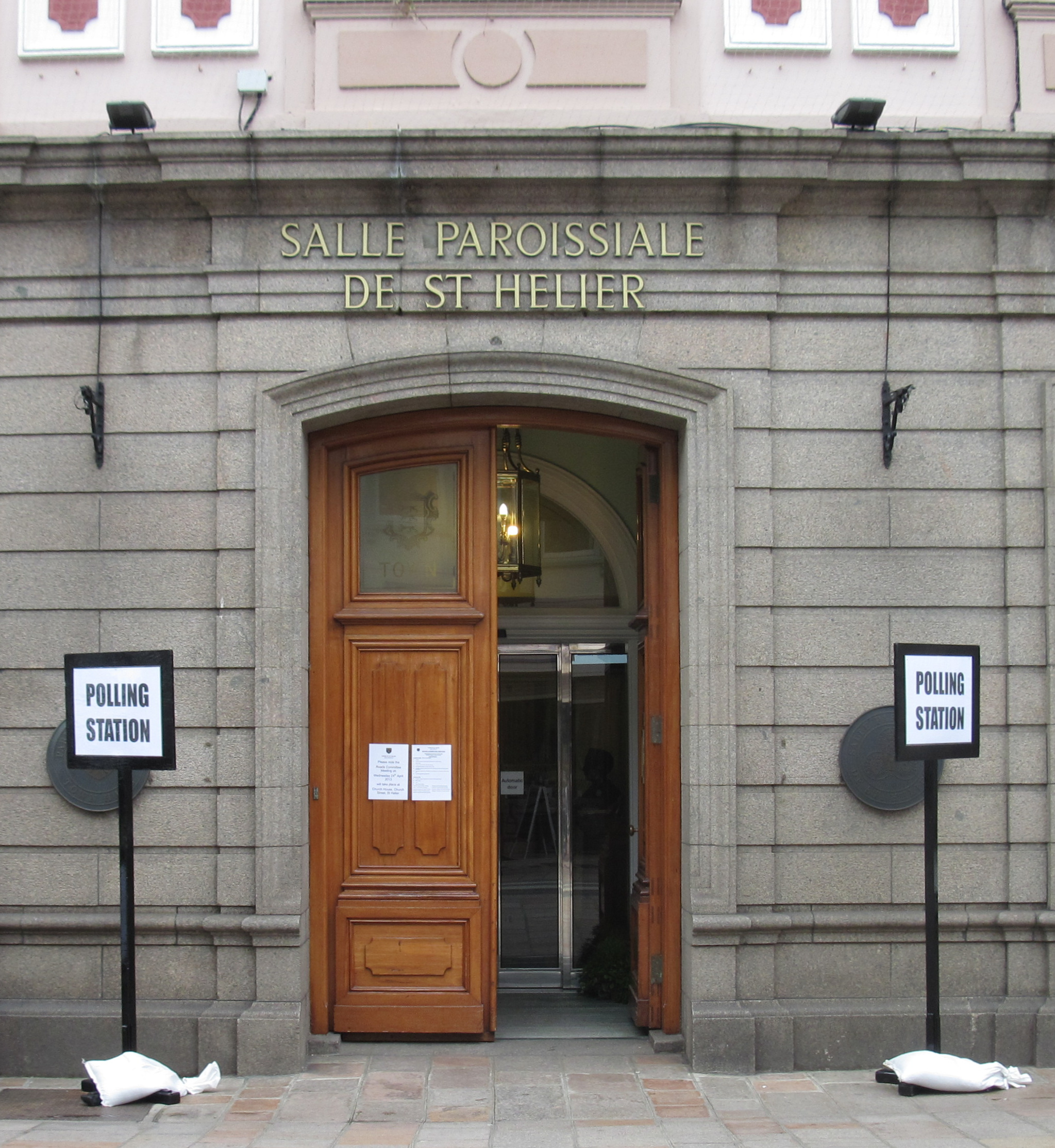
Polling station in Saint Helier during referendum

Option A was supported by the "A Team", who claimed it was simple, fair and equal and its implementation would mean that "for the first time, all islanders will have an equal say in how the States is made up". Supporters of Option B claimed that removing the Constables from the States would lead to parishes being unrepresented, whilst supporters of Option C claimed that keeping the Senators was important, describing them as "the most representative elected office and therefore the most democratic."

States deputy Jeremy Maçon called for a minimum turnout threshold of 40% for the referendum to encourage more people to vote, but the proposal was rejected by a vote of 31–13 in the States. A proposal by Constable Phil Rondel for a 51% threshold was rejected by 36–7. Adrian Lee, an expert on Jersey politics, claimed that turnout would probably be low enough for the States to ignore the results.

In March, Senator Lyndon Farnham asked the treasury minister for £5,000 to be given to each of the campaign groups, and for each campaign's spending to be capped at £10,000. Farnham is supporting the Option C campaign.

== Results ==
Choice	First round		Second round	
Choice	Votes	%	Votes	%
Option A	6,581	39.59	6,707	45.02
Option B	6,804	40.93	8,190	54.98
Option C	3,239	19.48		
Unused votes	–	–	1,727	–
Invalid/blank votes	155	–	155	–
Total	16,779	100	16,779	100
Registered voters/turnout	63,945	26.24	63,945	26.24
Source: States of Jersey, BBC

== Aftermath ==
The States voted on adopting the reforms in July 2013, but rejected them by a vote of 28–21, with one abstention. Following the vote, Simon Crowcroft resigned as chairman of the Privileges and Procedures Committee.
