= Prêtre Martin =

Prêtre Martin (Father Martin), also Prestre Martin in Old French is a character from old French proverbs who serves the Mass alone to himself:

- Prêtre Martin qui chante et qui répond (19th century) - 'Father Martin who chants and who responds', said of a man who wants to be involved in everything.
- Faire le Prêtre Martin (15th century) - 'To do Father Martin', meaning "to answer to oneself".

Osip Mandelstam likened poets to Prêtre Martin in his essay "On the interlocutor" ["О собеседнике"].
