= Vingtaine de Bas du Mont au Prêtre =

Vingtaine in Saint Helier, Jersey

Vingtaine de Bas du Mont au Pretre Bas du Mont au Pretre
- Vingtaine
- Location within Jersey Location within Channel Islands
- Coordinates: 49°11′22″N 2°06′14″W
- Country: Jersey
- Parish: Saint Helier

Population (January 1, 2021)
  - Total: 5,780
- Time zone: UTC+00:00
- Postal code: JE4–8PA

Vingtaine de Bas du Mont au Prêtre is one of the six vingtaines of St. Helier Parish on the Channel Island of Jersey. With the Vingtaine du Rouge Bouillon this vingtaine forms District St. Helier Central which returns five Deputies to the States of Jersey.

The Roads Inspectors for this Vingtaine are Mr. Paul Huelin and Mr. Daren O'Toole.

== Gallery ==
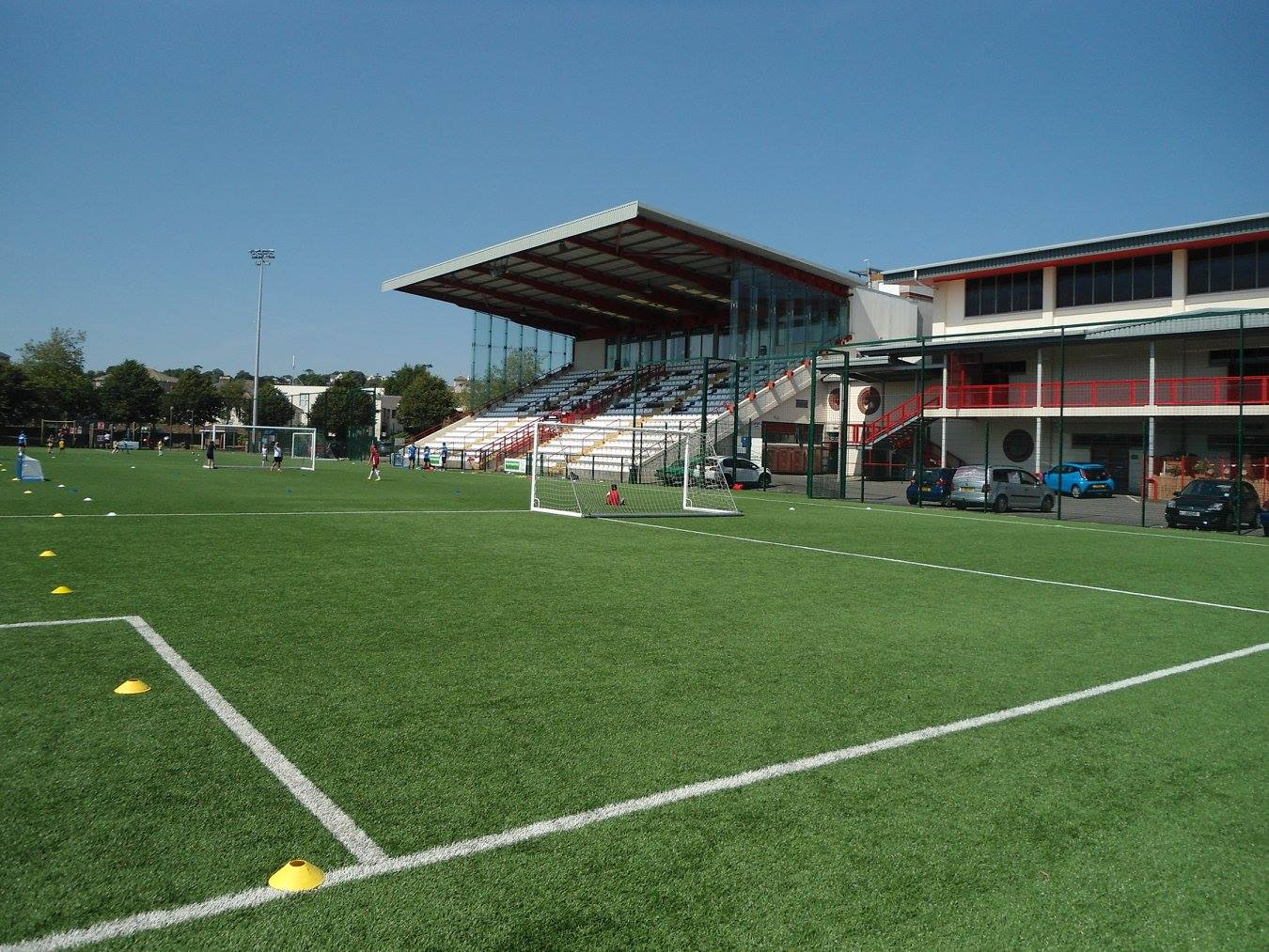
Springfield Stadium

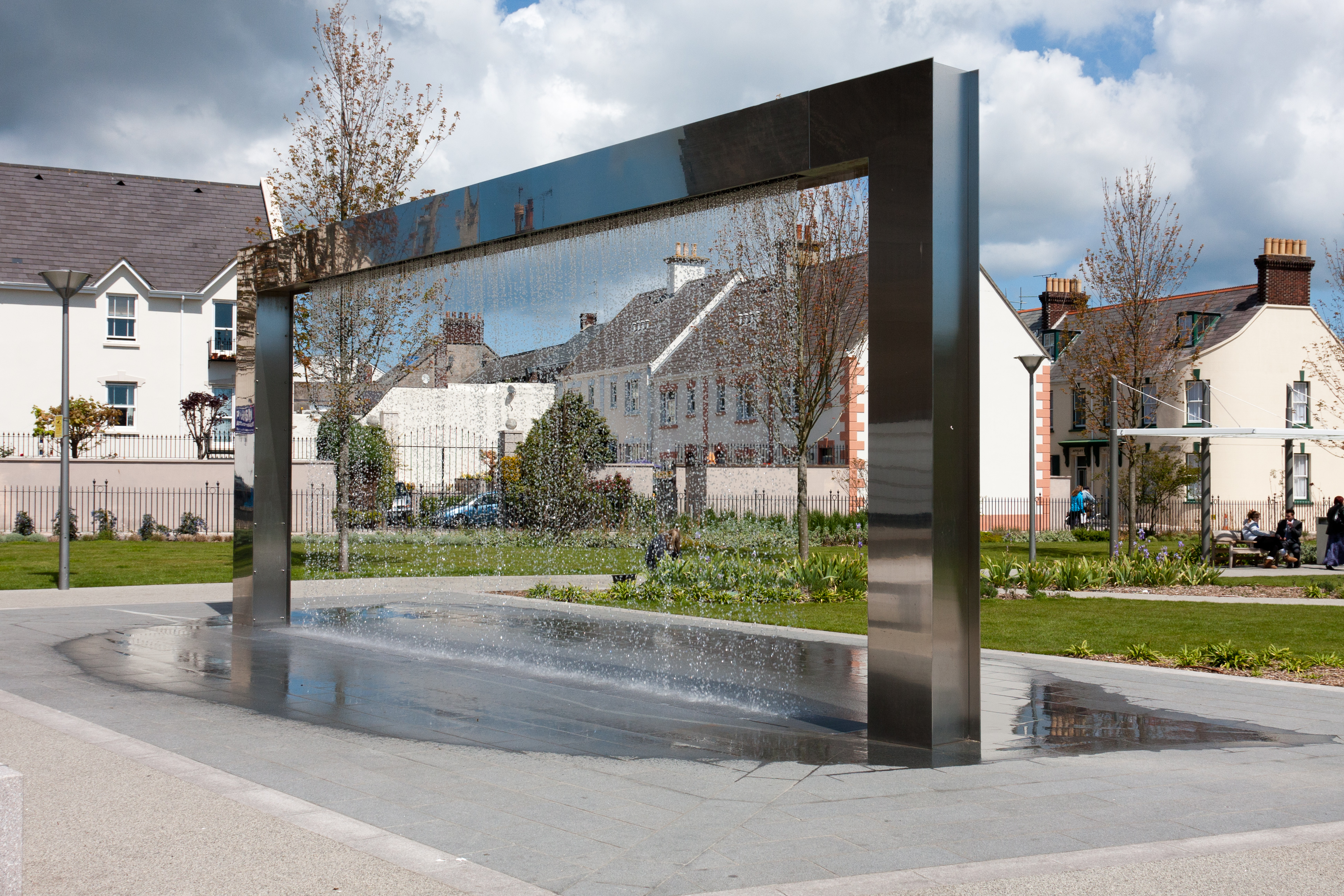
There is a park in the south-east of the vigntaine
