= Procureur du Bien Public =

French public prosecutor

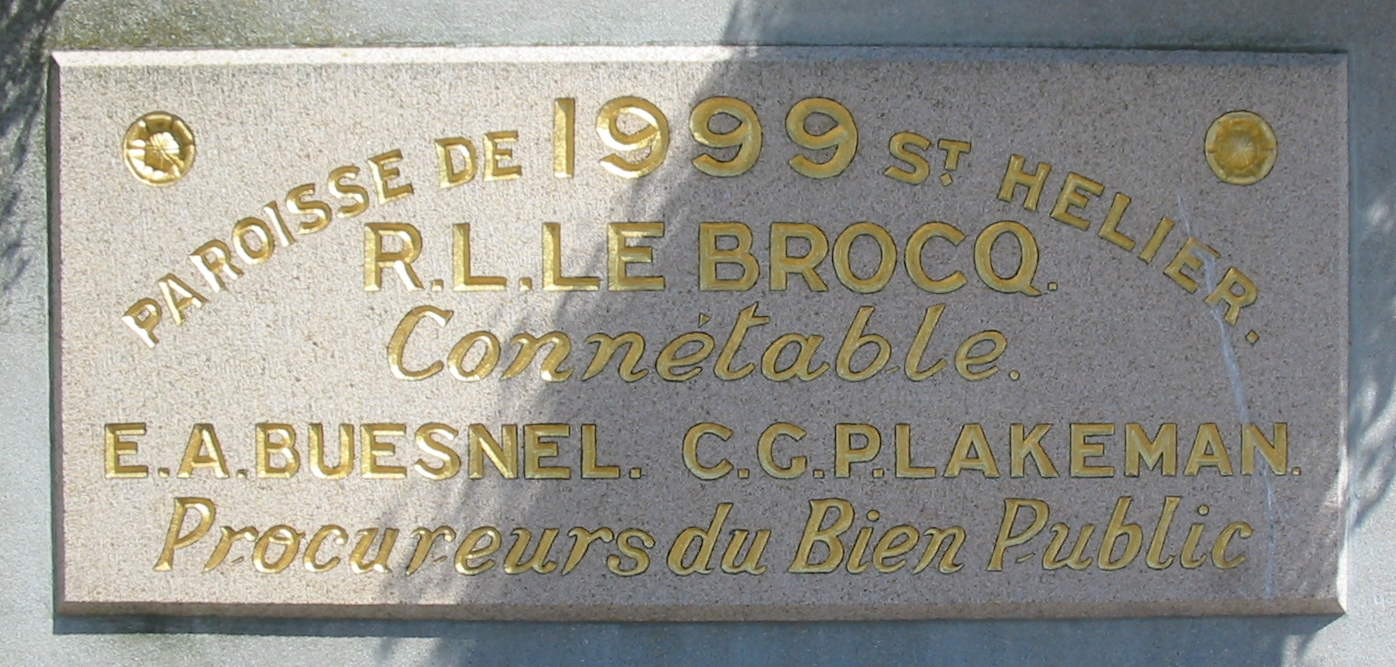
Official stone dated 1999 bearing the names of the procureurs du bien public during whose term of office the stone was placed

A procureur du bien public (French: attorney of the public good) is the legal and financial representative of a parish in Jersey. Procureurs are elected for a term of three years.

There are two procureurs for each parish and their duty is to act as public trustees, maintaining an oversight of parish finances and represent the parish along with the connétable in respect of property transactions of the parish (if so authorised by a vote of the parish assembly).

Since 2003 (in accordance with the Public Elections (Amendment) (Jersey) Law 2003) procureurs du bien public are elected at a public election. Before the passage of the 2003 law an assembly of electors of each parish elected the procureurs in accordance with the Loi (1804) au sujet des assemblées paroissiales.
