= Connétable (Jersey and Guernsey) =

Elected heads of parishes in Jersey and Guernsey

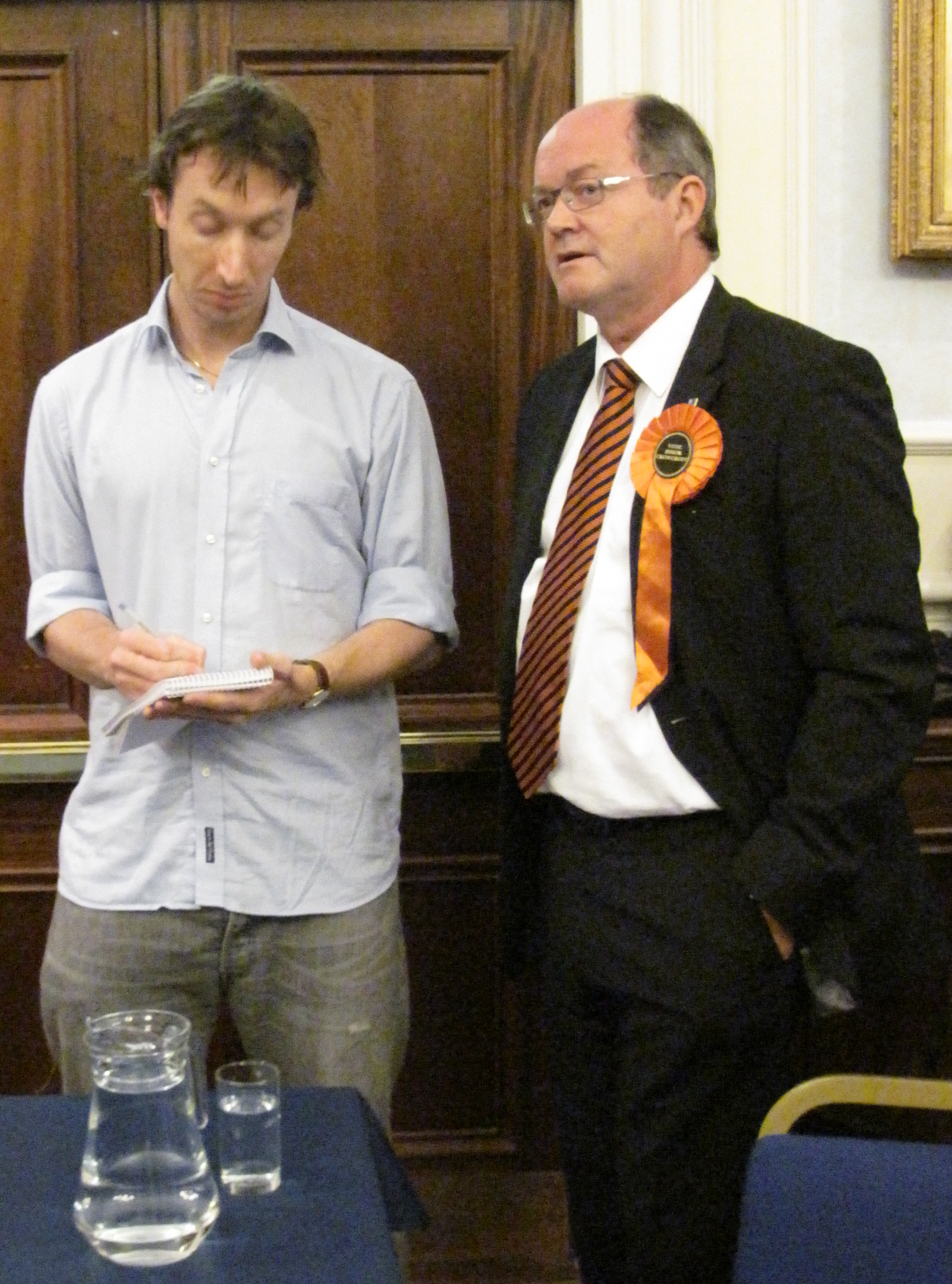
Simon Crowcroft (right), Connétable of St Helier

Connétables or constables (Jèrriais: Connétabl'ye) are the civic heads of the twelve parishes of Jersey and ten parishes of Guernsey. The Connétable is grounded in Norman customary law. The structure, powers and responsibilities of the role differ between the islands, reflecting their different political histories.

== Jersey ==
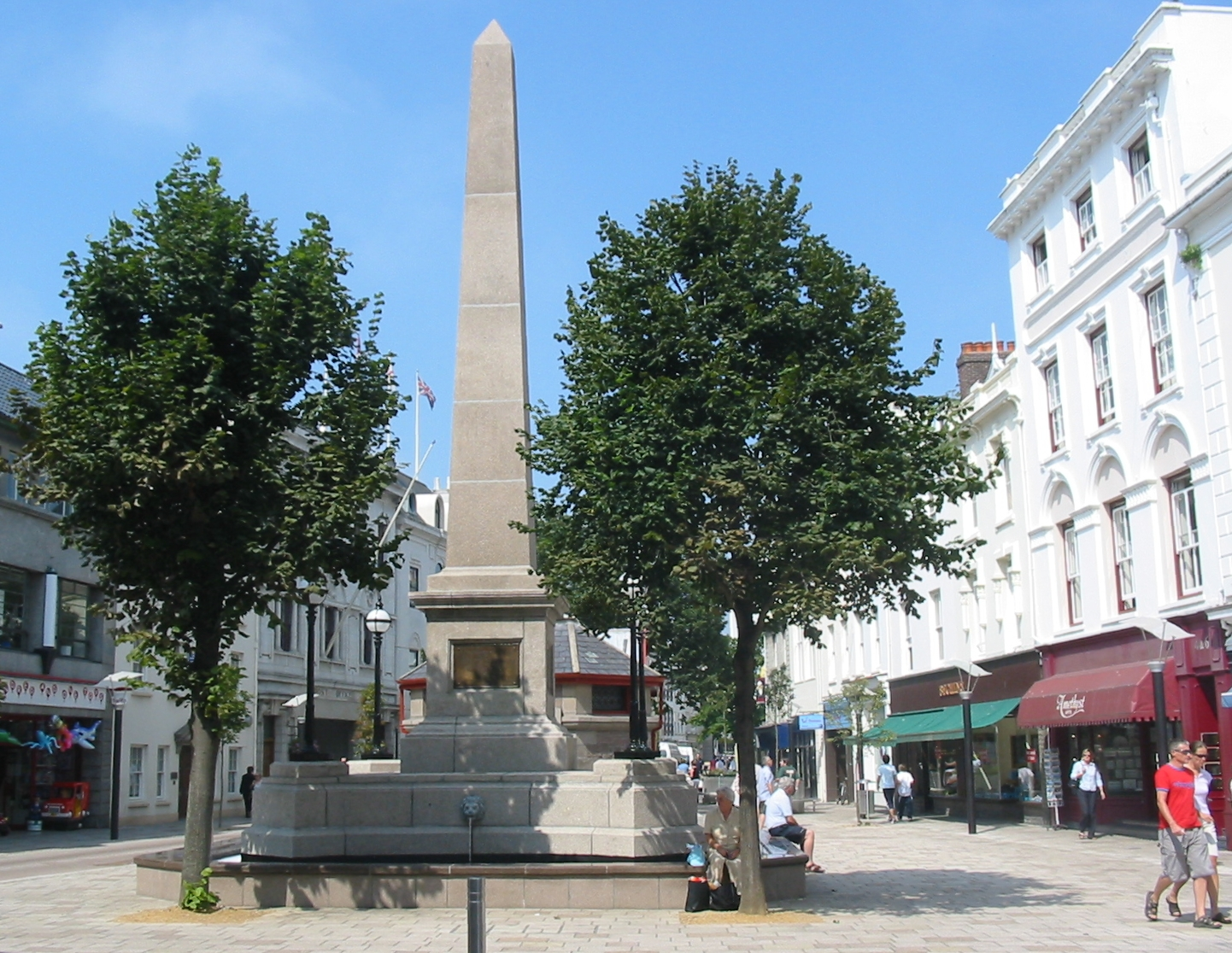
Monument in St Helier to Pierre Le Sueur, elected connétable five times in the 19th century

Each of the 12 parishes elects a connétable.

In the parish, the connétable presides over the parish assembly (l'assemblée paroissiale), which sets the rates (land tax), elects various officers, votes on applications for liquor licenses, names roads, and authorises contracts to be entered into by the parish.

The connétable is also head of the parish's honorary police force.

Each connétable is, by reason of that office, a member of the States Assembly.

In Jersey, each parish elects a connétable at general elections to run the parish and also represent the parish in the legislature, the States Assembly.

At parish-level, the constable presides over the roads committee, the Conseil Paroissial (except St. Helier) and parish assemblies. The twelve constables also collectively sit as the Comité des Connétables. The constable is the titular head of the Honorary Police. With the roads inspectors, roads committees and other officers, the constable of each parish also carries out a visites du branchage twice a year.

=== History ===
The origins of the connétable are believed to be military and the position is recorded as early as 1462. The office is unique to the island, being no parallel office in England or mainland Normandy, though Victor Hugo believed the office to be of English origin, perhaps a version of the English mayor.

== Guernsey ==
In Guernsey, each parish elects two constables, the senior constable and the junior constable. Persons elected generally serve a year as junior and then senior constable. The senior constable presides over the Douzaine that runs the parish. The constables are responsible for enforcing the decisions of the parish including the branchage (summer hedge-cutting).

=== Sark ===
In Sark, the connétable (or constable) is the senior of two police officers and police administrator and the vingtenier is the junior police officer.

== See also ==
- Constable
