= Visite du branchage =

Type of inspection of roads in Jersey and Guernsey

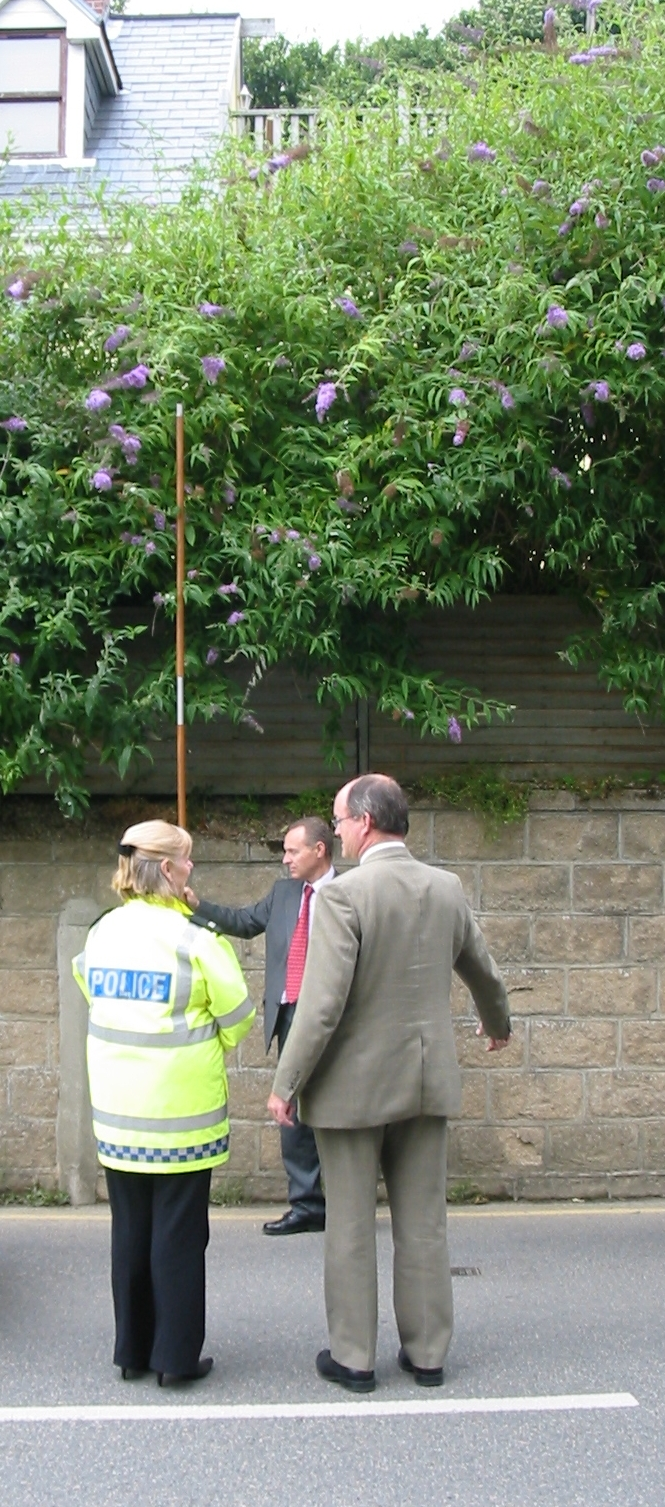
Measuring overhanging greenery with a pole of standard length

A visite du branchage is an inspection of roads in Jersey and Guernsey to ensure property owners have complied with the laws against vegetation encroaching onto the road.

== Jersey ==
A visite du branchage takes place in each parish twice a year to check that occupiers of houses and land bordering on public roads have undertaken the 'branchage'.

The Loi (1914) sur la Voirie imposes a duty on all occupiers of property to ensure that encroachments are removed from the public highway.

The first visite is between 24 June – 15 July and the second is between 1 – 21 September.

On a visite du branchage the connétable, assisted by the members of the roads committee, roads inspectors and the centeniers, will visit the roads of his parish accompanied by the vingteniers in their respective vingtaines to ensure that the branchage has been completed. Occupiers of land may be fined up to £50 for each infraction.

- the 'branchage' [hedges, branches and overhanging trees] has been trimmed back so as to give a clearance of 12 feet over main roads and by-roads;
- the 'branchage' [hedges, branches and overhanging trees] has been trimmed back so as to give a clearance of 8 feet over footpaths; and all trimmings have been removed from the road.

If the branchage has not been completed the occupier will be required to undertake the work and, if it is not carried out, the parish may arrange for the work to be done and charge the occupier the cost of that work.

The visite du branchage applies to all public roads including main roads, by-roads and footpaths.

The Branchage Film Festival, takes its name from the visites du branchage.

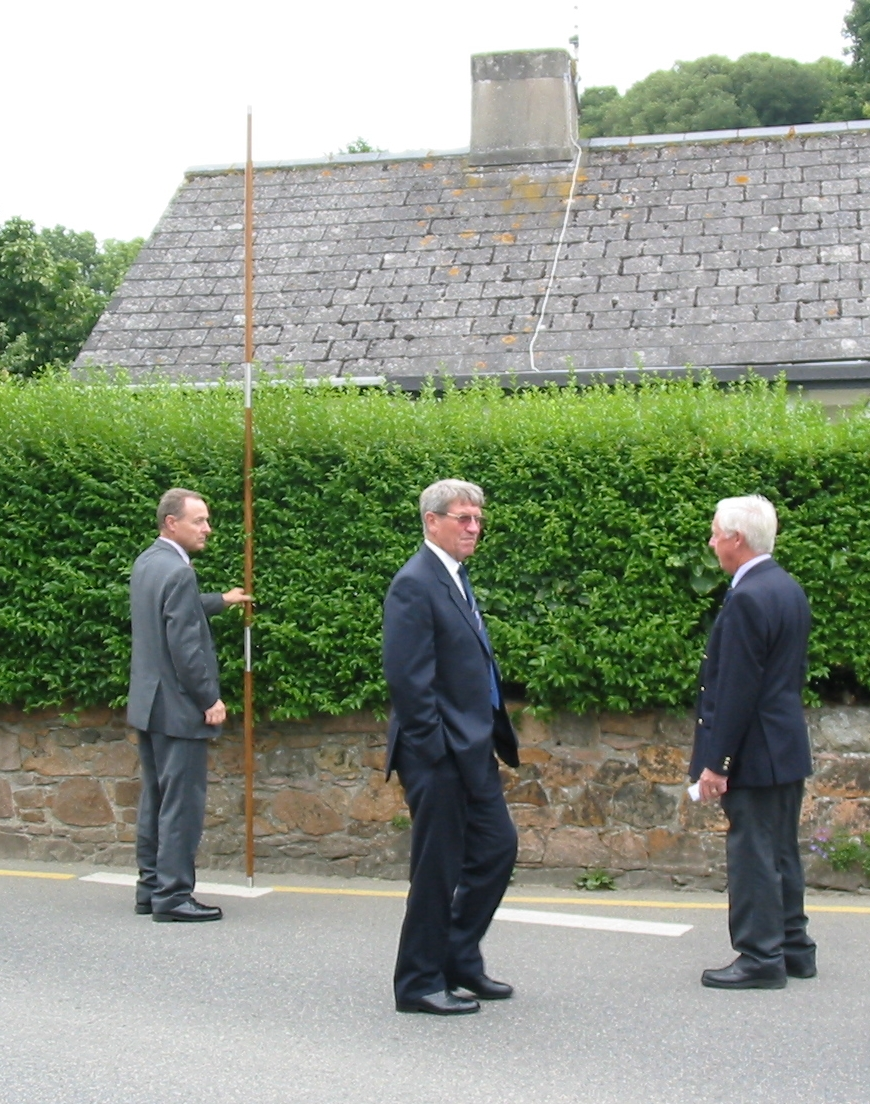
Members of the Roads Committee inspect an encroaching hedge

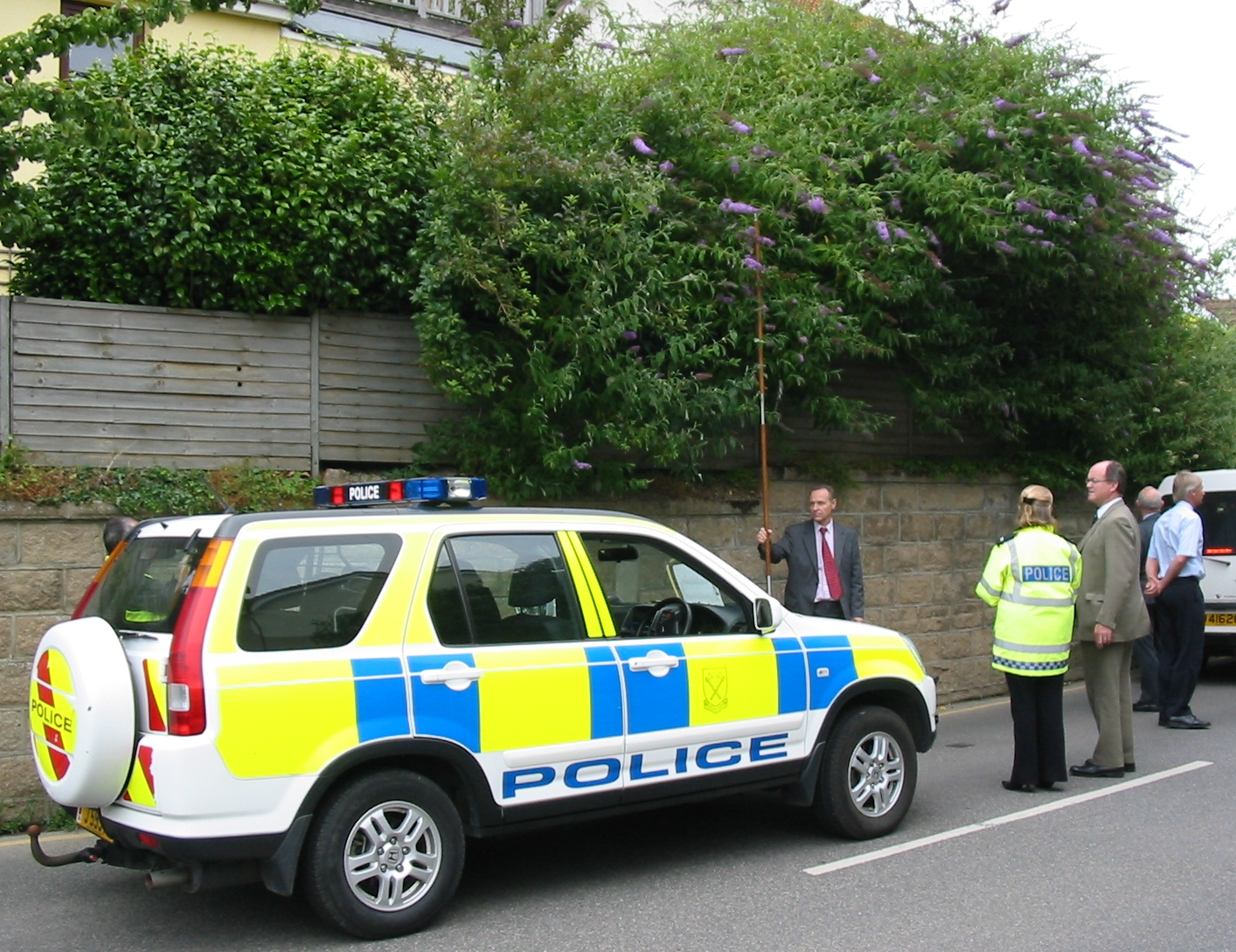
A Vingtenier draws up any charges

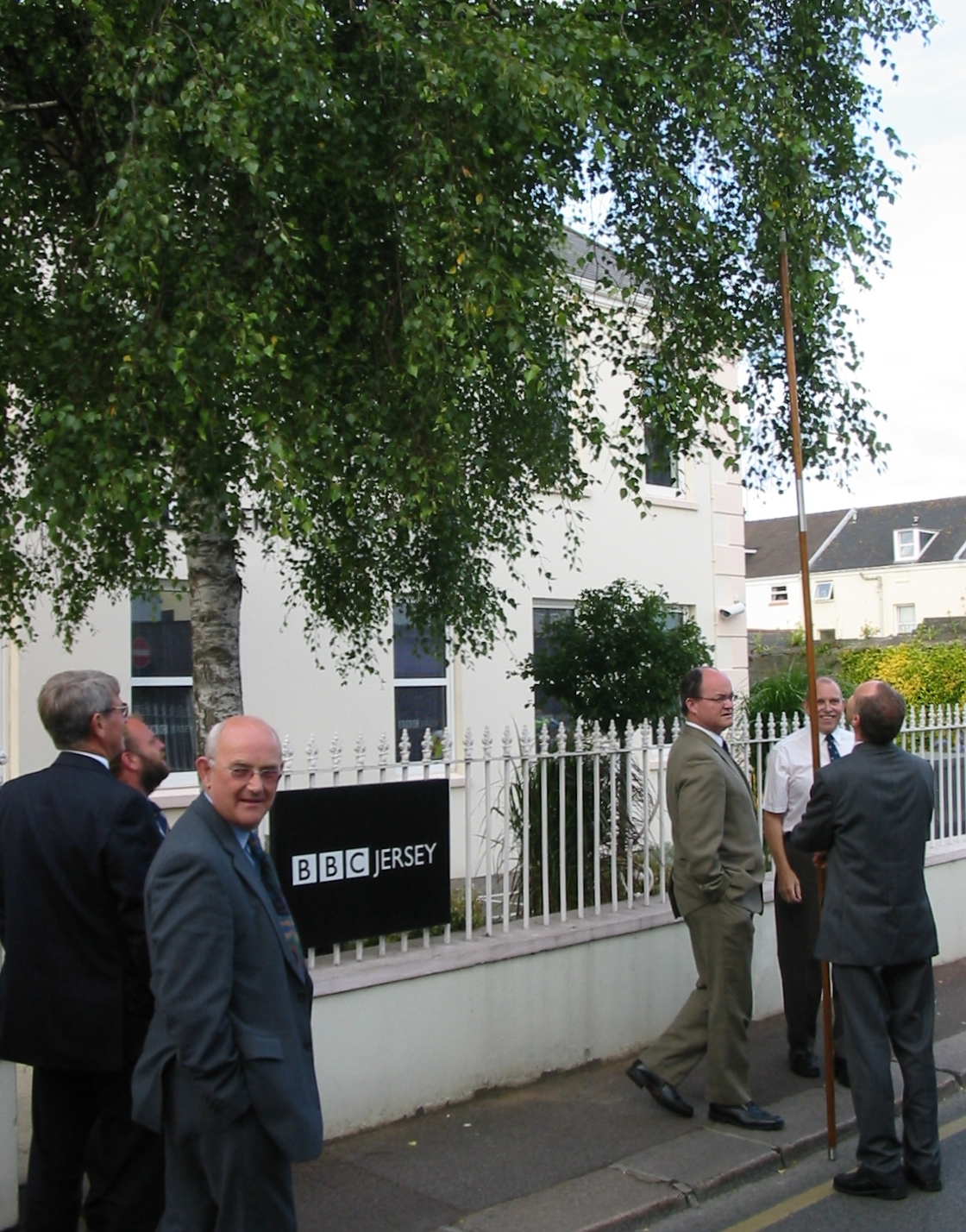
A tree is measured for encroachment over the footway and the roadway
