= Vingtaine de Haut du Mont au Prêtre =

Vingtaine in Saint Helier, Jersey

Vingtaine de Haut du Mont au Prêtre Haut du Mont au Prêtre
- Vingtaine
- Location within Jersey Location within Channel Islands
- Coordinates: 49°12′08″N 2°05′50″W
- Country: Jersey
- Parish: Saint Helier

Population (January 1, 2021)
  - Total: 2,939
- Time zone: UTC+00:00
- Postal code: JE4–8PA

Vingtaine de Haut du Mont au Pretre is one of the six vingtaines of St. Helier Parish on the Channel Island of Jersey.

Along with the Vingtaine du Mont Cochon and the Vingtaine du Mont à l'Abbé it forms District St Helier North and elects four deputies to the States Assembly.
