= Roads inspector (Jersey) =

Public office in Jersey

A roads inspector (Jèrriais: l's înspecteurs des c'mîns; French: inspecteur des chemins) is a statutory office in Jersey responsible for the maintenance of public highways.

The parish assembly elects two roads inspectors for each vingtaine (or cueillette in St Ouen) for a three-year term of office in accordance with the Loi (1914) sur la Voirie. Roads inspectors are responsible for the repair of by-roads of the parish and have to ensure the instructions of the roads committee are carried out.

In the parish of St Helier, the roads inspectors also undertake additional non-statutory responsibilities with regard to the policing of infractions of the Road Traffic Act (Jersey) and other areas of the law within the parochial remit such as dog licensing and fly posting. They also serve as conduits of information to the Honorary Police.

Their chief role is the annual visite du branchage and the triennial visite royale.
