= Honorary Police =

Unpaid police force in Jersey

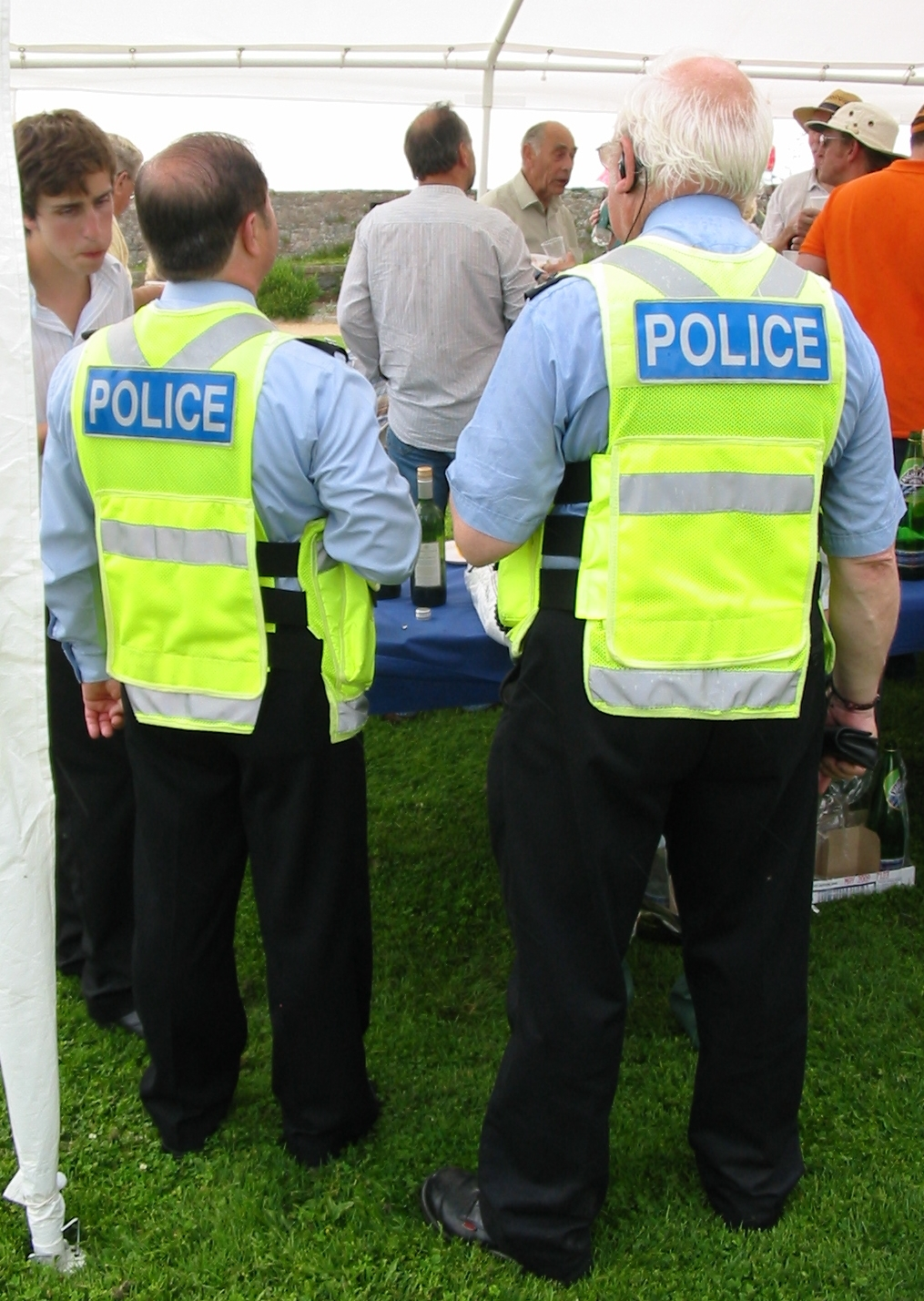
Officers of Saint Helier Honorary Police (Police Honorifique de Saint-Hélier)

There is an Honorary Police (French: Police Honorifique) force in each of the twelve parishes of Jersey. Members of the Honorary Police are elected by the voters of the parish in which they serve, and are unpaid.

Honorary Police officers have, for centuries, been elected by parishioners to assist the connétable of the parish to maintain law and order. Officers are elected as centeniers, vingteniers or constable's officers, each with various duties and responsibilities.

Until the 19th century, the Honorary Police provided the only civilian law enforcement in Jersey. However, in the early part of the 19th century, crime was widespread among the urban population in Saint Helier (around 25,000 people) and paid police officers for the Parish of Saint Helier were appointed in 1853, and their remit was later extended to serve the whole island as the States of Jersey Police (SOJP). However, even today the SOJP cannot charge anyone with an offence – charges have to be brought by the centenier of the parish in which the alleged offence was committed – and as such the Honorary Police continue to have a significant role in policing.

== History ==
The Honorary Police have existed since around the 15th century, though possibly before.

Until the 19th century the Honorary Police provided the only civilian law enforcement in Jersey. However, in the early part of the 19th century, crime was widespread among the urban population in St Helier (around 25,000 people) and paid police officers for the Parish of St Helier were appointed in 1853 and their remit was later extended to serve the whole island as the States of Jersey Police (SOJP).

In 2012, the connétables were removed from their function as the head of the parish police, with the post transferring to the chief centenier (the chef de police).

== Honorary Police offices ==
Each parish elects a number of centeniers, vingteniers and constable's officers who act in the name of the connétable of the parish in maintaining law and order. These officers are elected for a period of three years and take an oath in the Royal Court.

All Honorary Police officers must live in the parish at the time of their first election or, in the case of St Helier, be a ratepayer or mandataire of that parish. If an officer moves out of the parish during their term of office, they may continue their term of office with the approval of His Majesty's Attorney General and the connétable of the parish and may stand for re-election provided there is no break in service.

A person may be nominated for election as a member of the Honorary Police if, on the day of nomination, they are at least 20 years of age and less than 70 years of age.

Honorary Police officers are on duty for one week at a time, usually every three or four weeks depending upon the roster within the parish, and are on call 24 hours a day during that period. Honorary Police officers are elected to serve the parish but in certain circumstances may assist or operate outside the parish.

Anyone standing for election as a member of the Honorary Police will have to undergo a criminal record check.

== Ranks of the Honorary Police ==
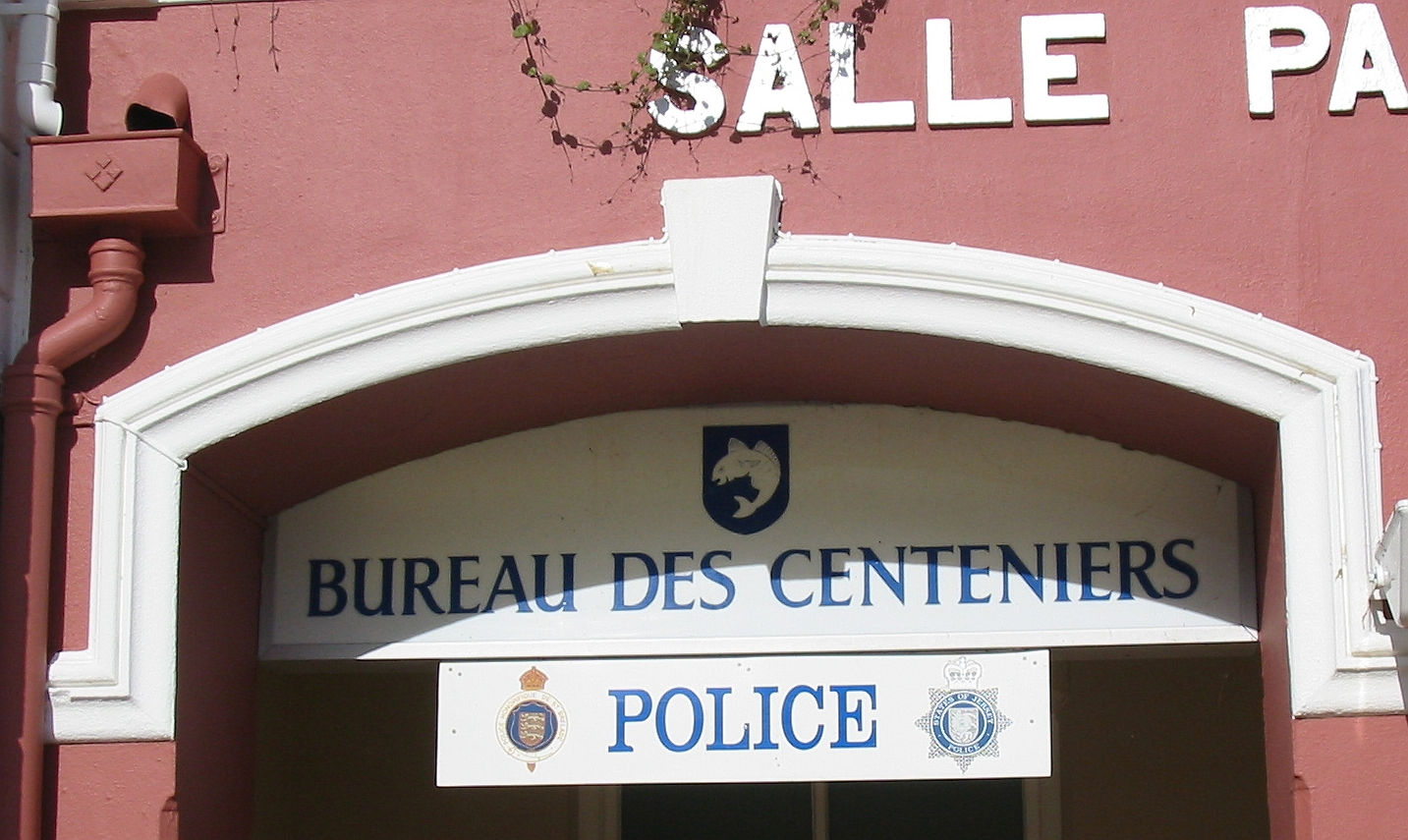
Bureau des Centeniers, Saint Brelade

=== Connétables ===
The connétables (the civil head of the parish) were formerly the head of the parish honorary police force, but this role has since been transferred to the chef de police. The connétables do still have a supervisory role over the police force and organise, with the chef de police, an annual policing plan for their parish. They also handle complaints against members of the parish police.

=== Centenier and chef de police ===
A centenier is a senior member of the Honorary Police of Jersey. Centeniers are elected for a mandate of three years at a public election within the parish. In addition to general policing matters, the centenier remains the only officer entitled to charge and bail offenders. The constable of the parish appoints one of the centeniers as chef de police of the parish. Under Jersey law, anyone charged at the States of Jersey Police (SOJP) headquarters must be charged by a centenier of the Honorary Police, and they too will present the charges against an individual if the case is taken to the magistrate.

The centenier presides at parish hall enquiries and acts as prosecuting officer before the Magistrate's Court.

Centeniers are, if a person admits to an offence, able to give a written caution, a fine or charged to Court. This is a Parish Hall Sanction and not a criminal record, although the results are still reported to the SOJP to be placed on the person's record.

Separate enquiries are held for youth offences, where centeniers will try to resolve the situation without the need for the young offender to attend court, thus diverting them from obtaining a criminal record whenever possible.

If the person does not admit to an offence, the charge is still placed by the centenier, but the case is handled in court by a member of the Law Officers Department.

=== Vingtenier ===
A vingtenier is a member of the Honorary Police elected by a parish assembly of electors and ratepayers for a term of three years for a particular vingtaine (or, in St. Ouen, a cueillette) in that parish. Vingteniers, who occupy a rank below that of centenier in the Honorary Police, carry out general community policing in the parish, and fulfill administrative roles within their vingtaine in respect of tasks such as the visite du branchage. The office of vingtenier (which is believed to refer to a responsibility of looking after twenty (French: vingt) households) may date back to 1331, although the first recorded reference to the title of vingtenier dates to 1462.

The political system of Sark, which was modelled after Jersey's in 1579, also includes a vingtenier. In Sark, the sole vingtenier is elected by Chief Pleas as junior to the constable.

=== Constable's officers ===
Constable's officers are the lowest rank of the elected police officers, collectively known as the Honorary Police, who represent a vingtaine in a parish (or to a cueillette in St Ouen) of Jersey. Constable's officers do not have to live within that vingtaine (or cueillette), but must live within the parish at the time of their election. If they move in the interim they are allowed to complete their term of office. They assist both the centeniers and vingteniers of the parish with general policing matters.

== Attorney General ==
The Attorney General of Jersey also has the role of the titular head of the island's Honorary Police force. This is not a formal, but an informal, relationship between the police force and the role of the AG.

The Attorney General serves to:

- give directions and guidance to the Honorary Police;
- contribute during disciplinary proceedings concerning Honorary Police Officers; and
- supervise centeniers as prosecutors (in the Attorney's role as Chief Prosecutor).

== Mission ==
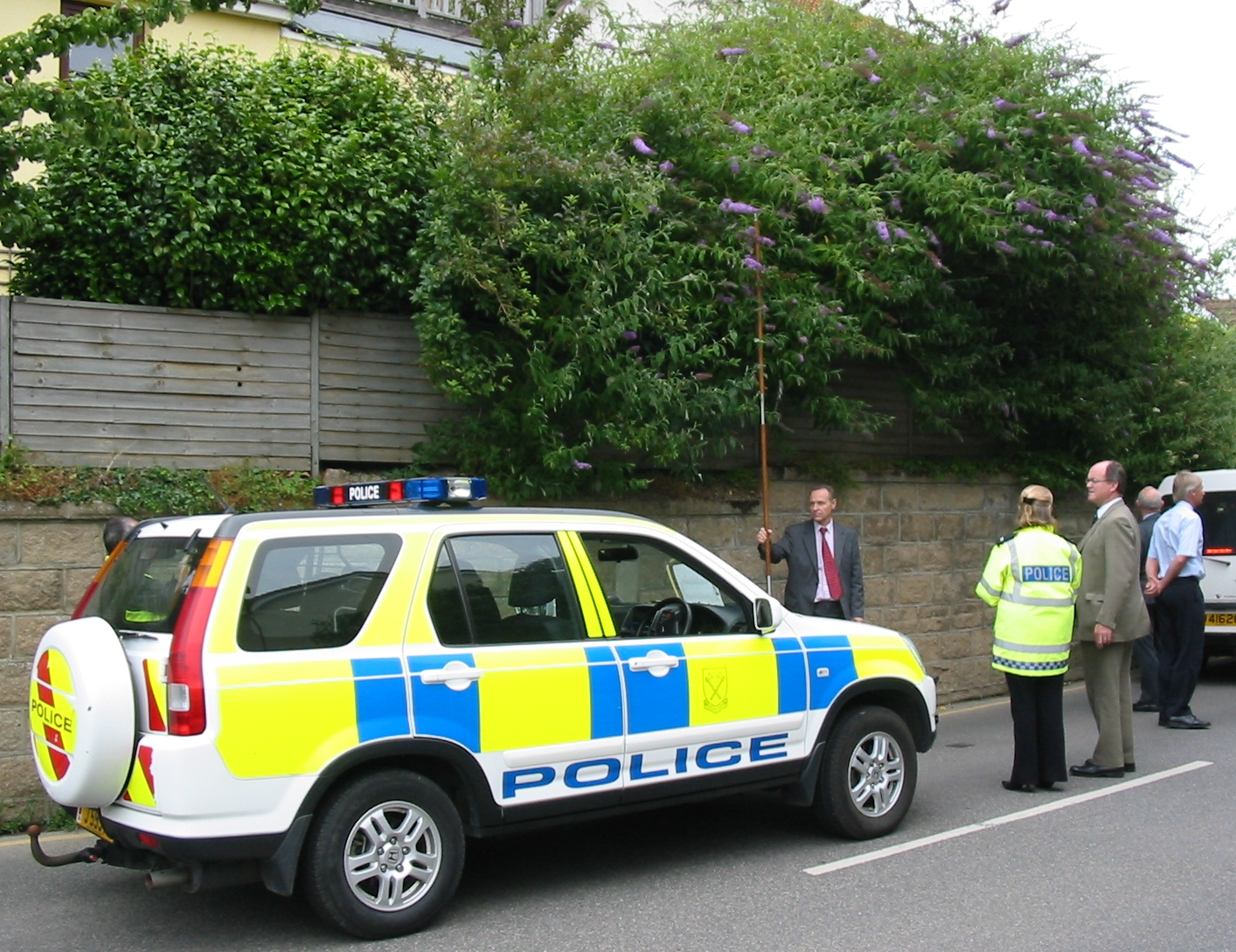
Saint Helier Honorary Police (Police Honorifique de Saint-Hélier) vehicle in attendance at visite du branchage

The tasks are very varied and can include the following: provide foot and mobile patrols, perform speed and road checks, perform premises licence and curfew checks, assisting in searches for missing persons, assist policing major events, centeniers perform parish hall enquiries, assist and co-operate with the States of Jersey Police (SOJP) and with other parishes’ Honorary Police in the policing of island events or as needed or requested.

Centeniers and vingteniers also assist their parishes with the visite du branchage twice yearly and the visite royale, which happens once every six years.

Duty is usually performed for a week on a rota basis. The different parishes differ slightly in their specific arrangements; however, all parishes hold a monthly meeting that their connétable must attend.

== Honorary Police Association ==
Centeniers, vingteniers and constable's officers are members of the Honorary Police Association.

== Comité des Chefs de Police ==
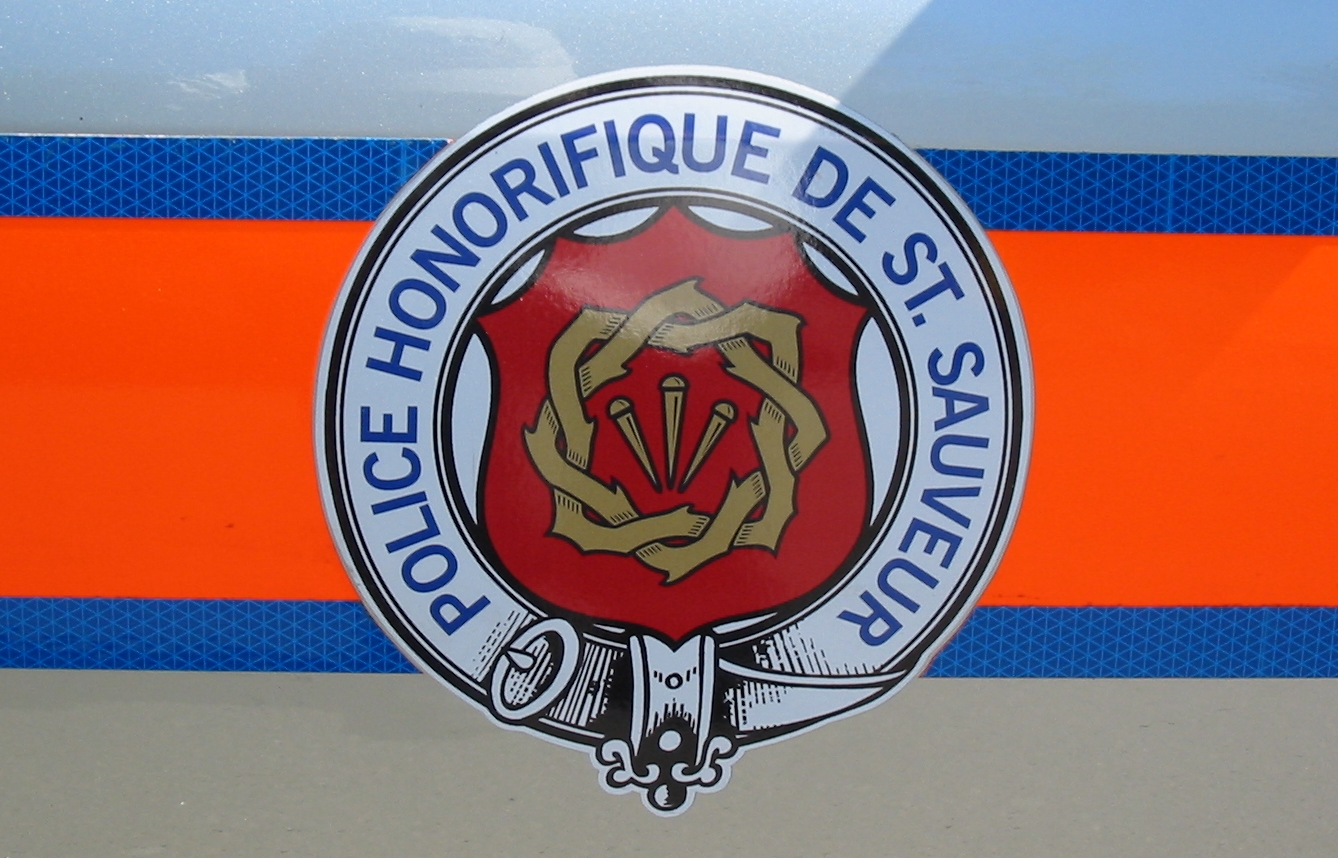
Livery of Saint Saviour Honorary Police (Police Honorifique de Saint-Sauveur) on the side of a police vehicle

A chef de police is appointed in each parish from the centeniers of that parish and is responsible to the connétable for the operational policing of the parish. The chef de police of every parish is a member of the Comité des Chefs de Police (the Chiefs of Police Committee), and it is the role of the Comité to seek to strengthen and uphold the Honorary Police by: fostering and maintaining the unity of its members; oversee the management of resources made available to the Honorary Police; co-ordinate the provision of advice and guidance to members of the Honorary Police; promote consistency in operational practice between the Honorary Police of each parish; and foster continued co-operation with the States of Jersey Police (SOJP) and other agencies.

== Honours ==
Established on 1 December 2014, the Jersey Honorary Police Long Service and Good Conduct Medal may be awarded to Jersey Honorary Police officers after twelve years service with a clasp awarded for each additional period of nine years service.

In addition, officers with a minimum of 5 years service received the Queen's Jubilee Medals of 2002, 2012, 2022 and the King Charles III Coronation Medal 2023 on the same basis as members of other British police services.

The service was also awarded the Queen's Award for Voluntary Service in 2003.

== See also ==
- States of Jersey Police is the professional police service of Jersey.
- Parish constable
- Special constable
- Auxiliary constable
- Auxiliary police
- Special police
