= St Helier =

Capital town and most populous parish of Jersey

St Helier Saint Hélyi (Norman) Saint-Hélier (French)
- Parish
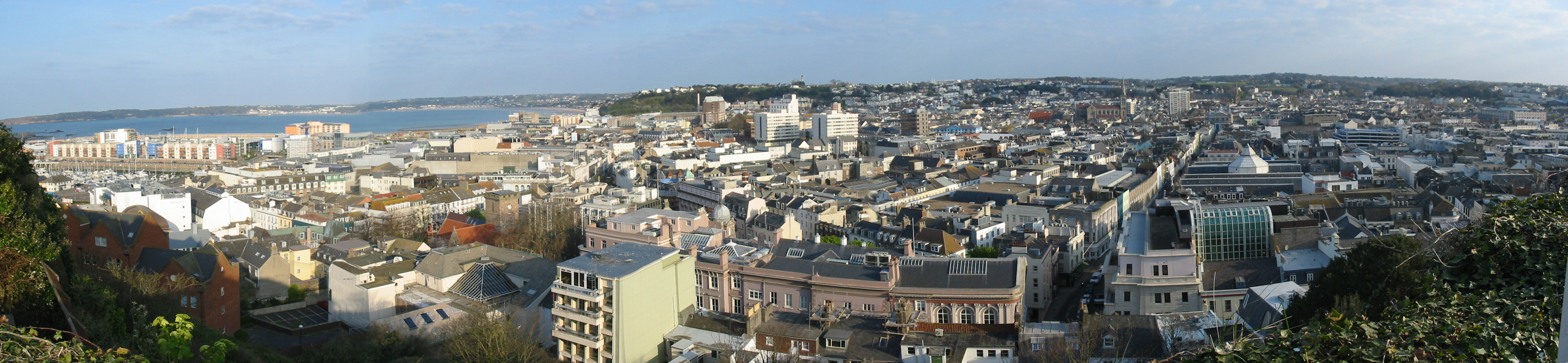
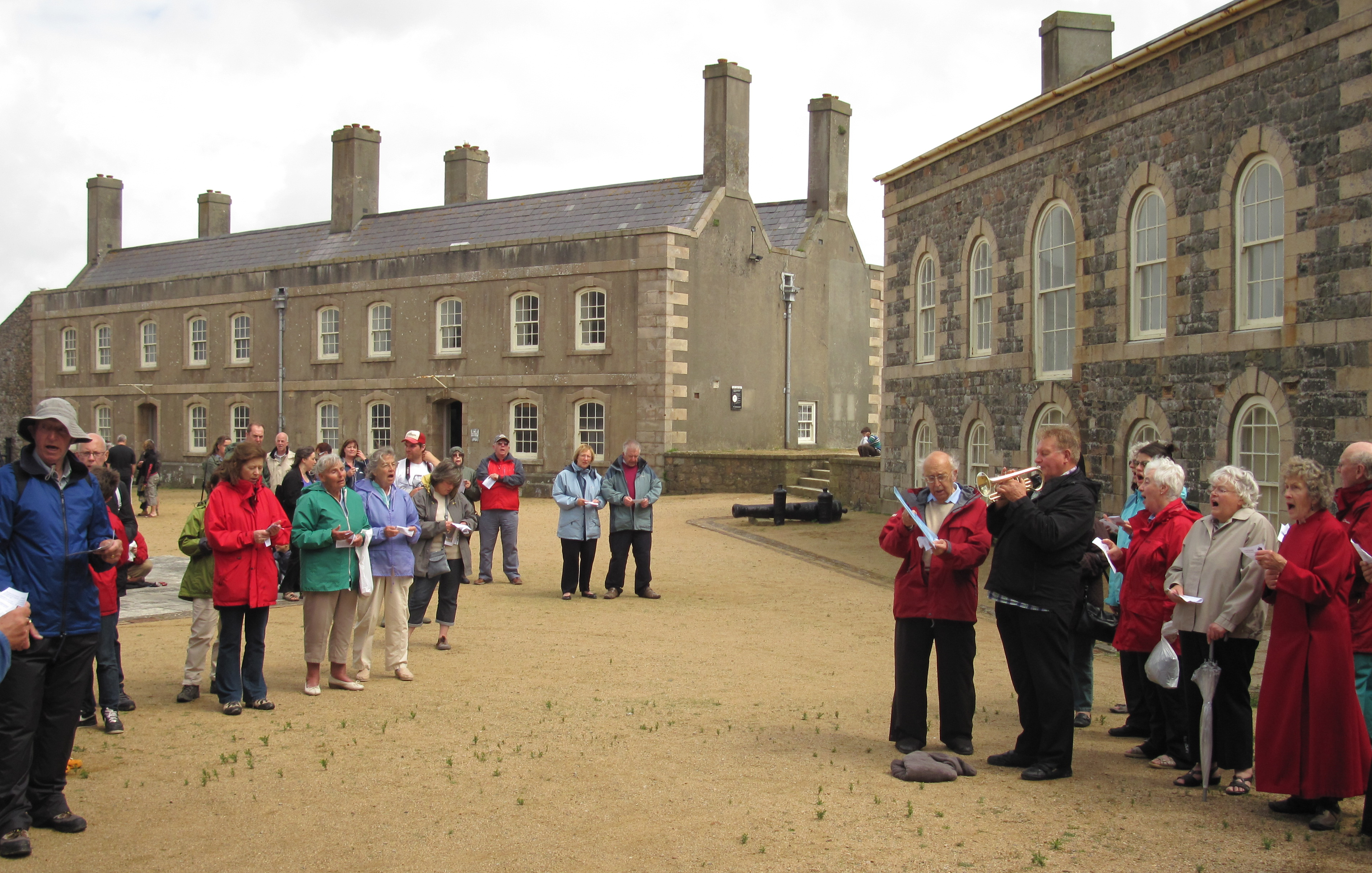
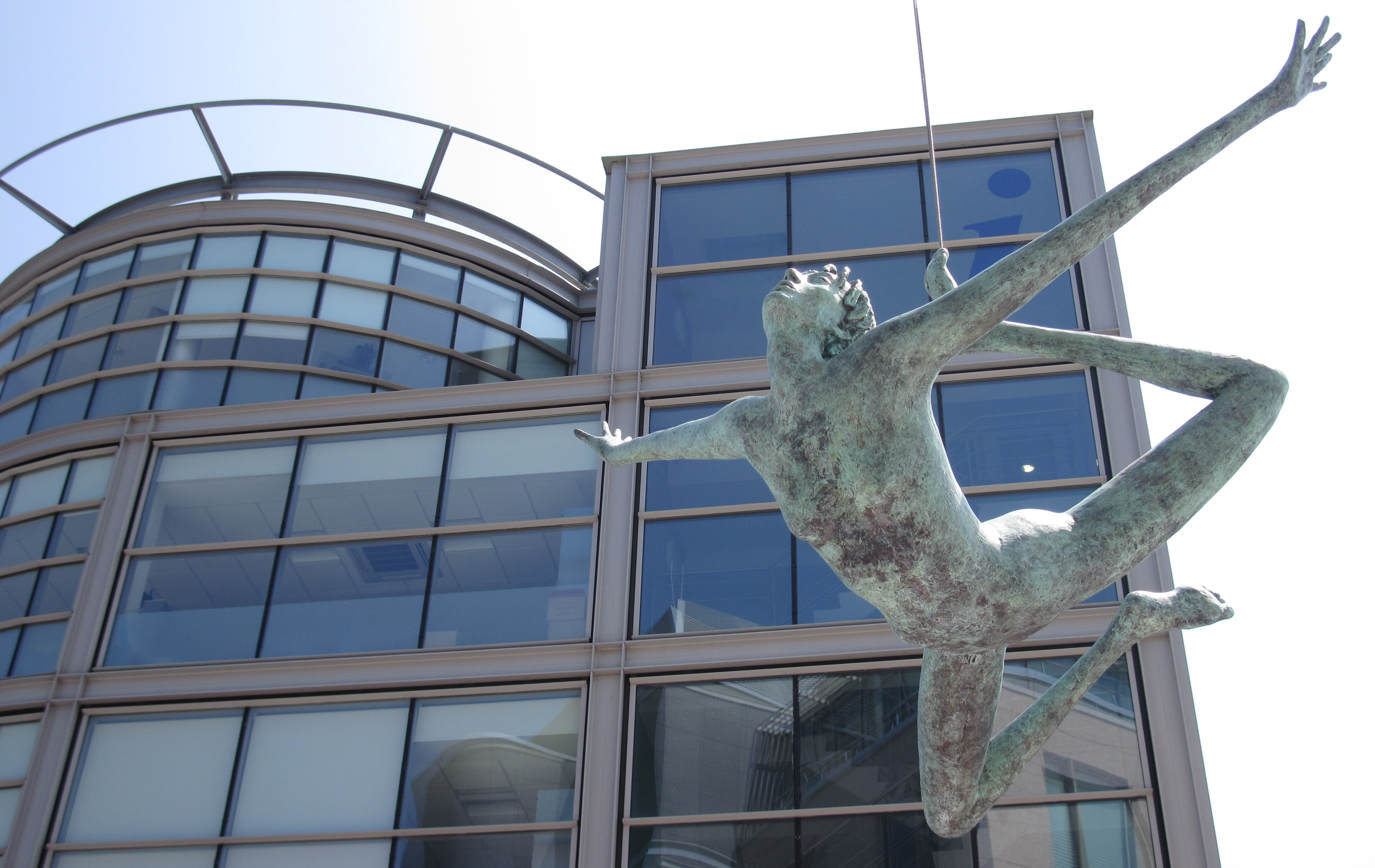
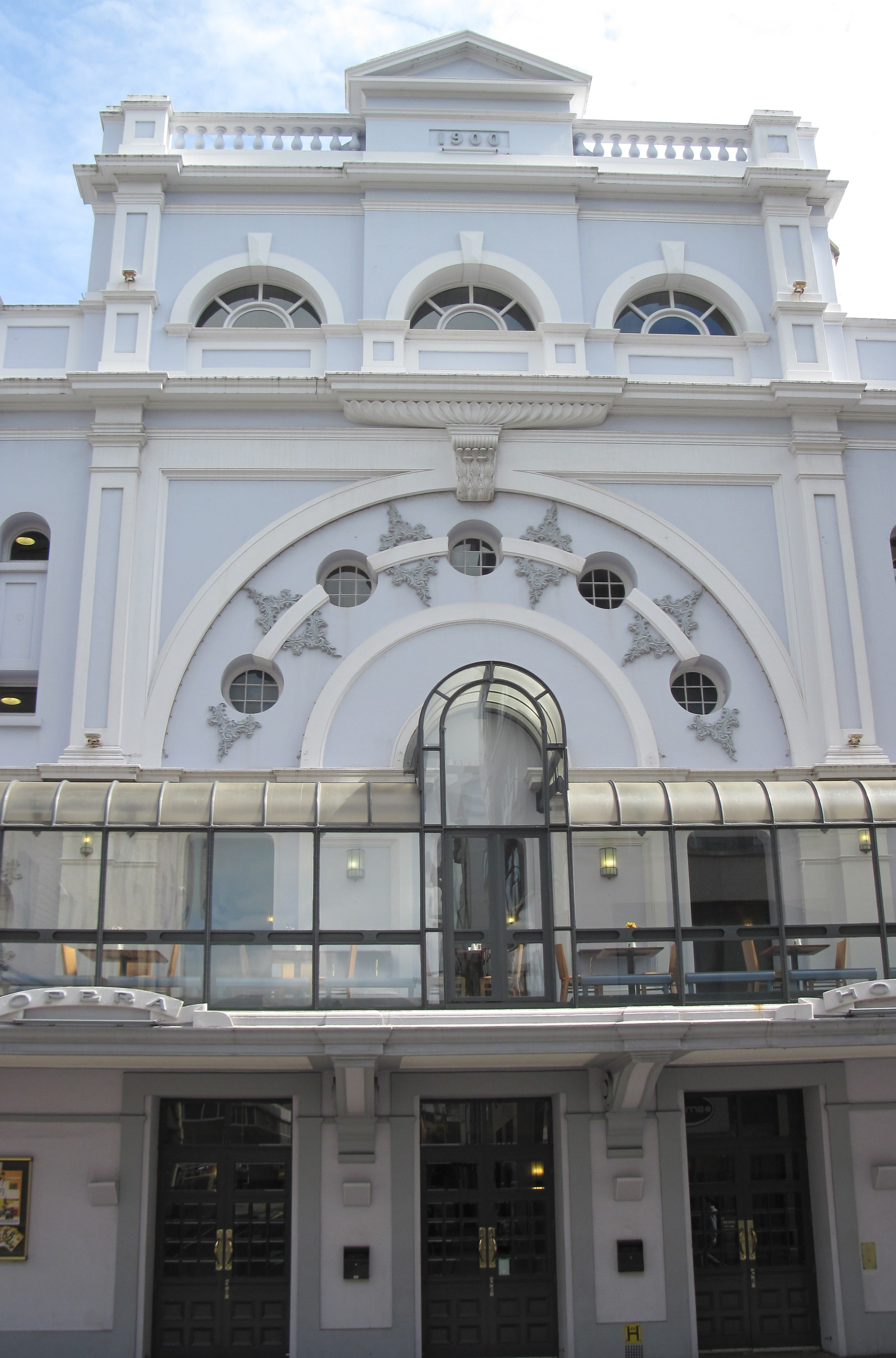
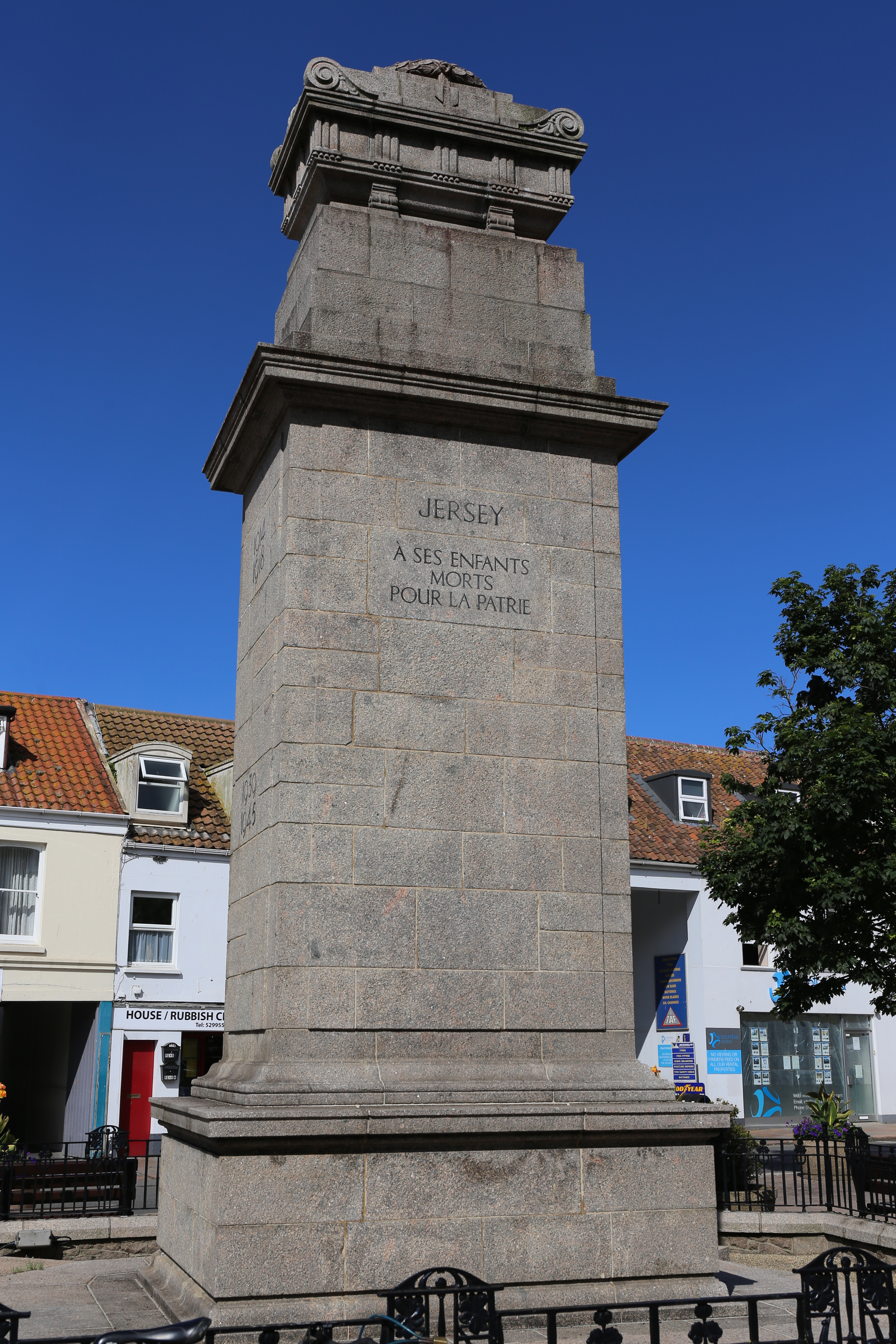
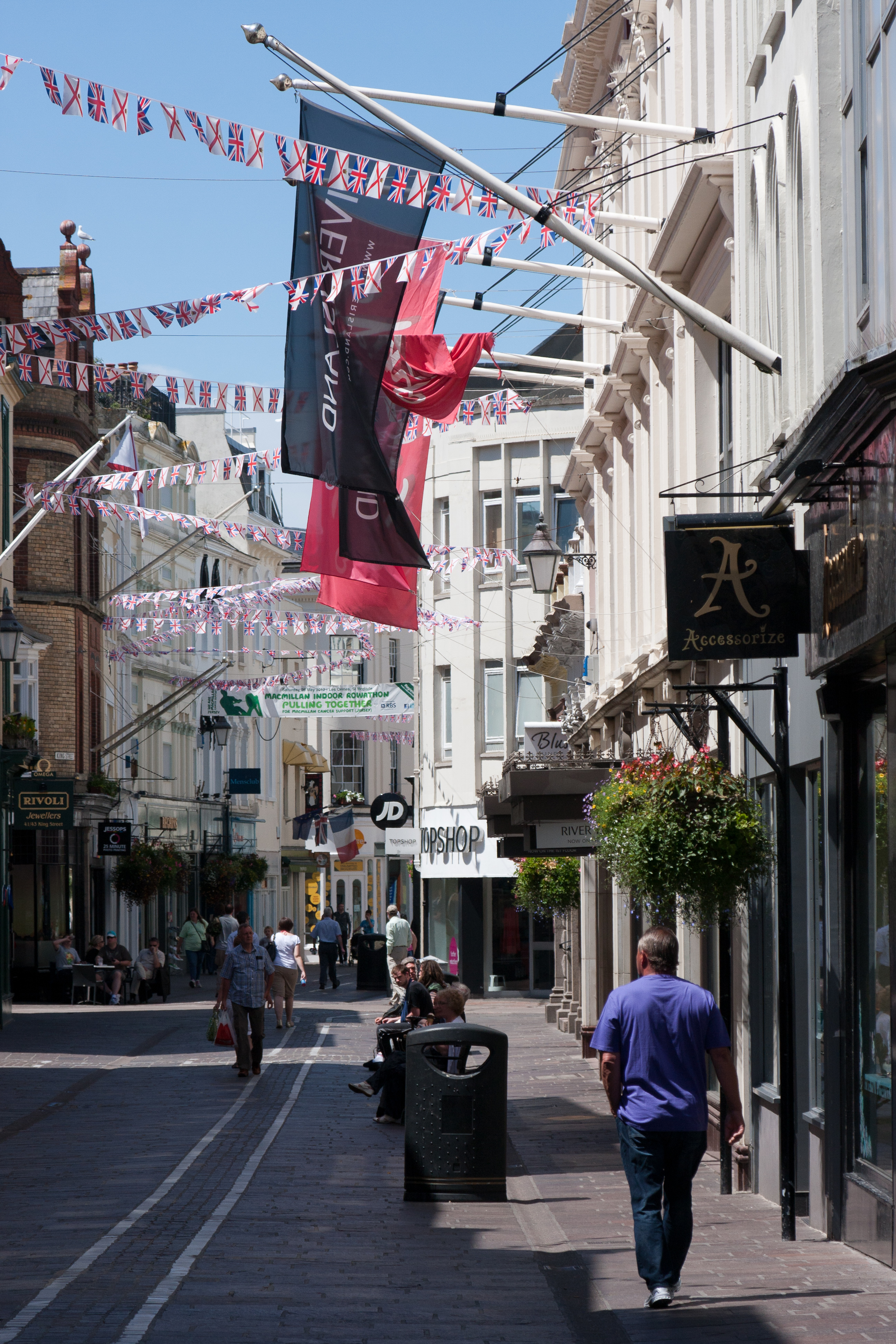
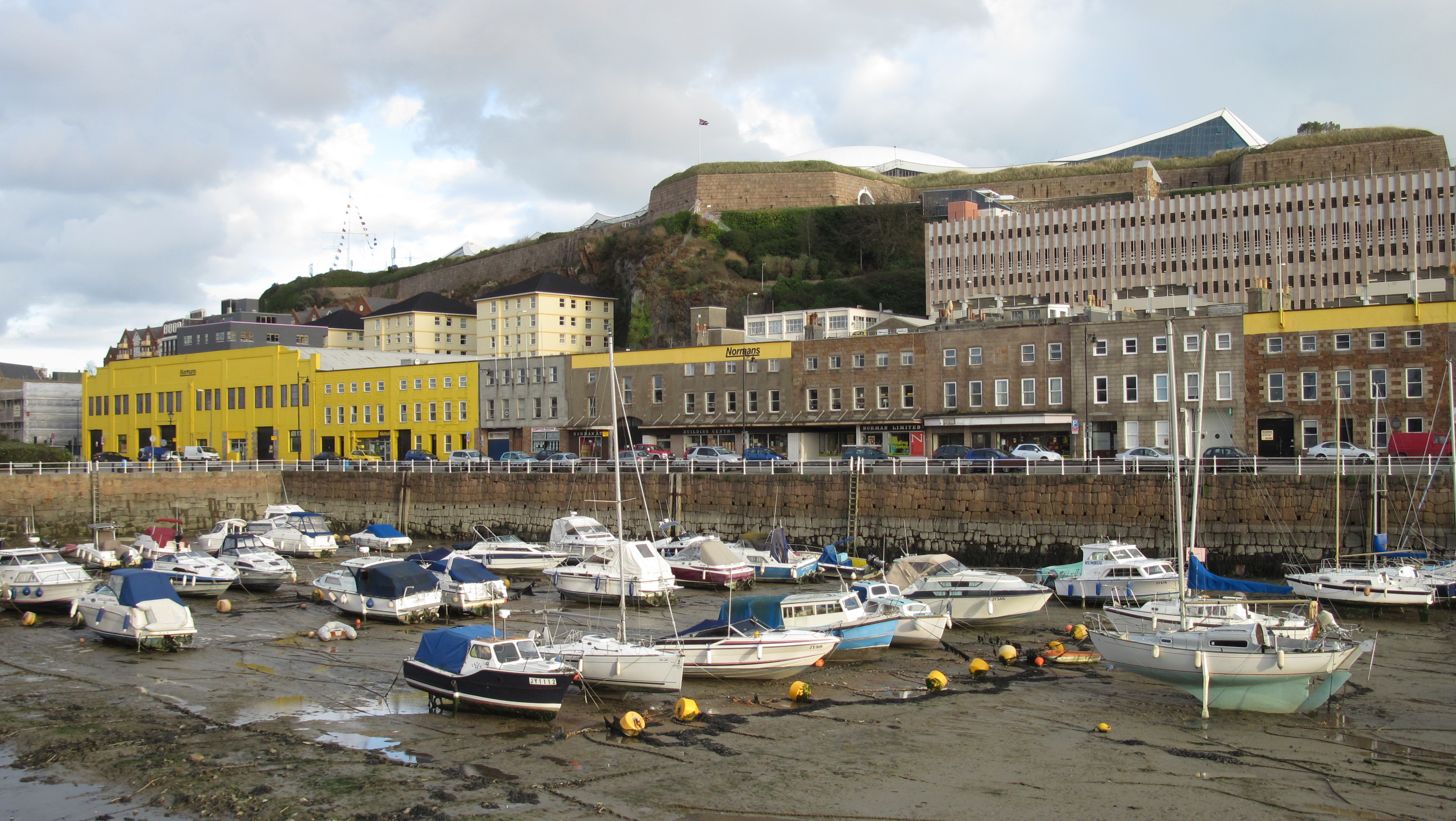
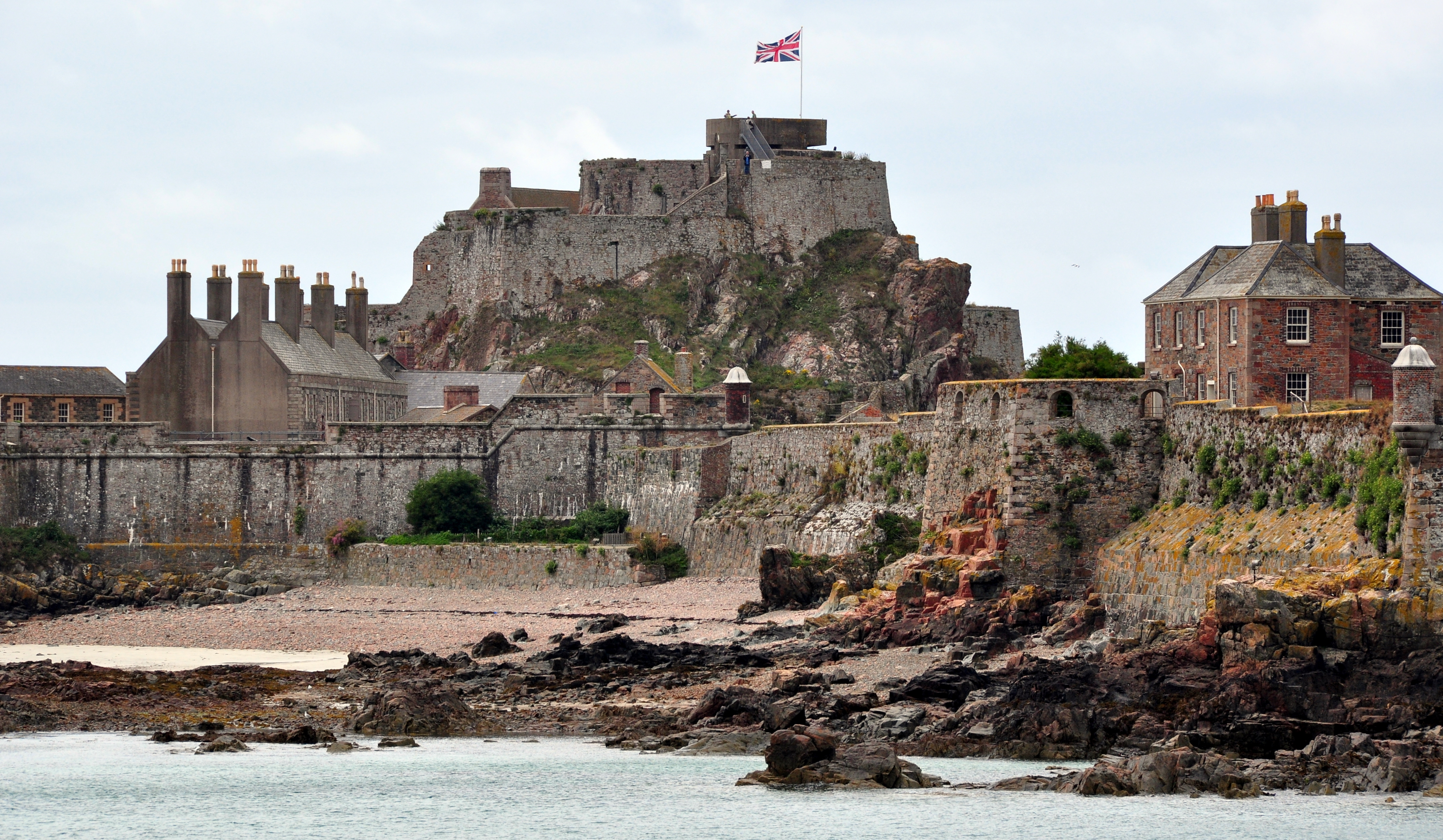
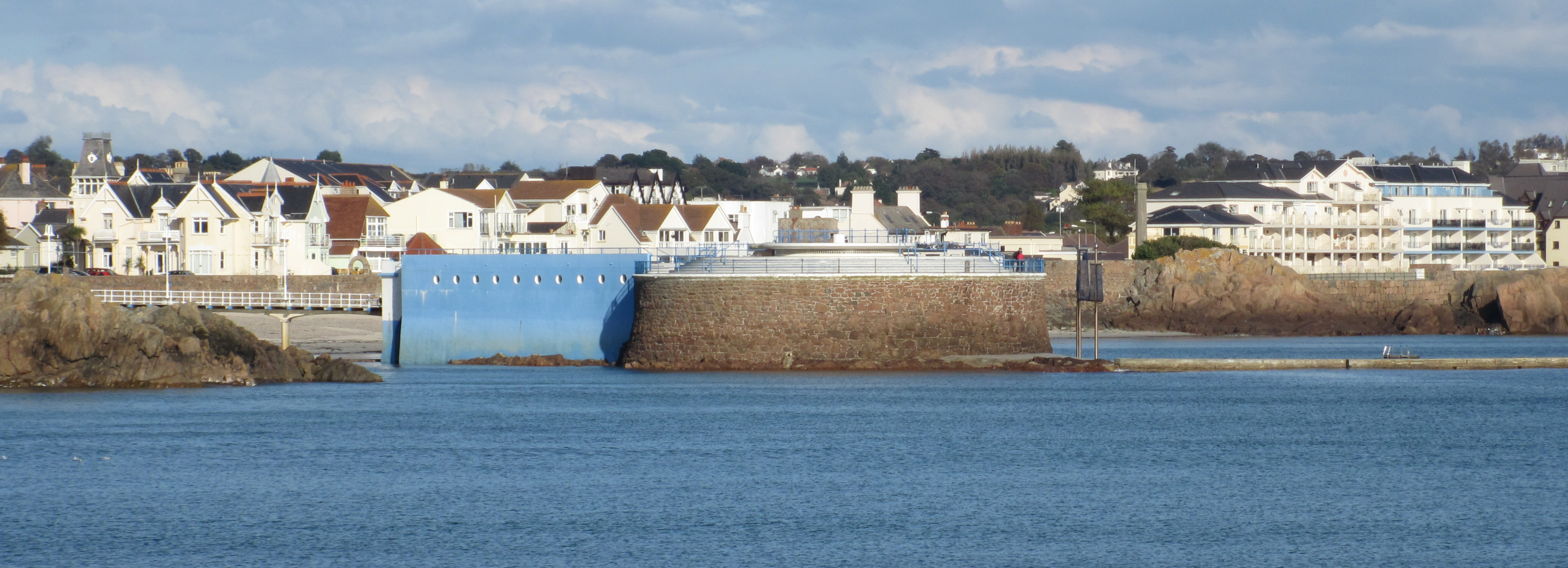
- Panoramic, Saint Helier pilgrimage, Jersey Girl sculpture, Jersey Opera House, Cenotaph, war memorial of Jersey; King Street, Ferries, Elizabeth Castle, Houses in Saint Helier

- Flag Coat of arms
- Nickname: Town
- Location of Saint Helier in Jersey

- Location within Jersey Location within Channel Islands
- Coordinates: 49°11′09″N 02°06′36″W
- Crown Dependency: Jersey
- Named for: Helier, patron saint of Jersey
- Vingtaines: List: Vingtaine de la Ville; Vingtaine du Rouge Bouillon; Vingtaine de Bas du Mont au Prêtre; Vingtaine de Haut du Mont au Prêtre; Vingtaine du Mont à l'Abbé; Vingtaine du Mont Cochon

Government
  - Connétable: Inna Gardiner (Ind.)

Area
  - Total: 10.6 km^{2} (4.1 sq mi)
  - Rank: Ranked 5th

Population (2021 census)
  - Total: 35,822
  - Density: 3,380/km^{2} (8,750/sq mi)

Ethnicity (2021 census)
  - Ethnic groups: 93.7% White; 37.0% Jersey; 25.8% British; 30.9% White Other; 3.0% Asian; 1.7% Black; 1.6% Mixed
- Time zone: GMT
  - Summer (DST): UTC+01
- Postcode district: JE2
- Postcode sector: 3 and 4
- Website: www.sthelier.je

St Helier (/ˈhɛliə/; Jèrriais: Saint Hélyi; French: Saint-Hélier) is the capital of Jersey, the largest of the Channel Islands in the English Channel. It is the most populous of the twelve parishes of Jersey, with a population of 35,822, over one-third of the island's total population. The town of St Helier is the largest settlement and only town of Jersey. The town consists of the built-up areas of St Helier, including First Tower, and parts of the parishes of St Saviour and St Clement, with further suburbs in surrounding parishes.

The greater part of the parish of St Helier is rural. It covers a surface area of 4.1 sq mi (10.6 km^{2}), being 9% of the total land area of the island (this includes reclaimed land area of 494 acres (2.00 km^{2}) or 200 ha).

The town sits by the coast in the southeastern corner of the parish. Within it lies the main commercial district and the principal harbour of the island. As the capital, it also hosts the island's government, parliament and courts. Evidence of settlement exists as far back as the 13th century, and the growth of the town since has been described as "spasmodic", its expansion reflecting the waves of migration to the island.

The parish arms are two crossed gold axes on a blue background, the blue symbolising the sea, and the axes symbolising the martyrdom of Helier at the hands of Saxon pirates in 555 AD.

== History ==
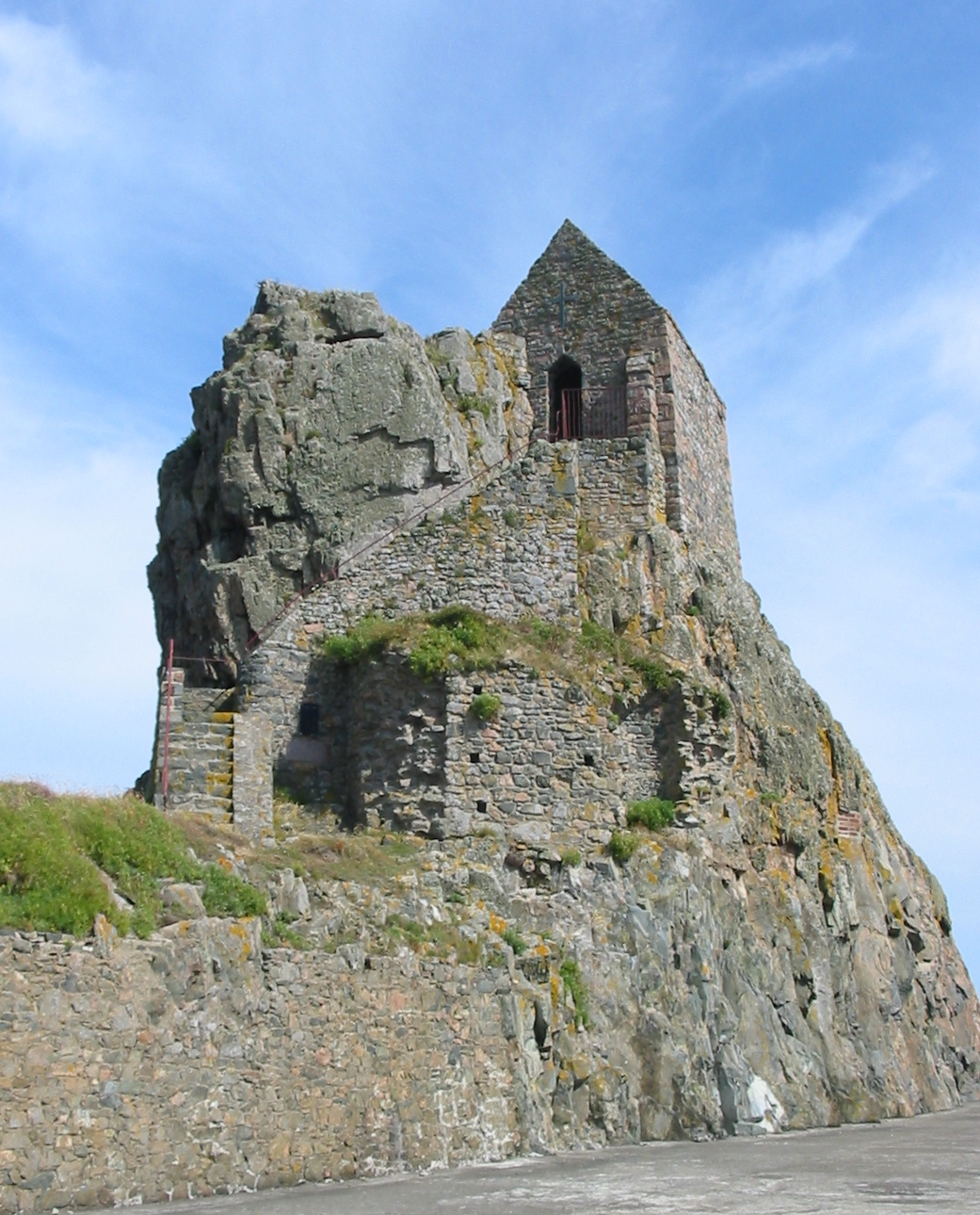
The Hermitage of Saint Helier lies in the bay off St Helier and is accessible on foot at low tide.

=== Saint ===
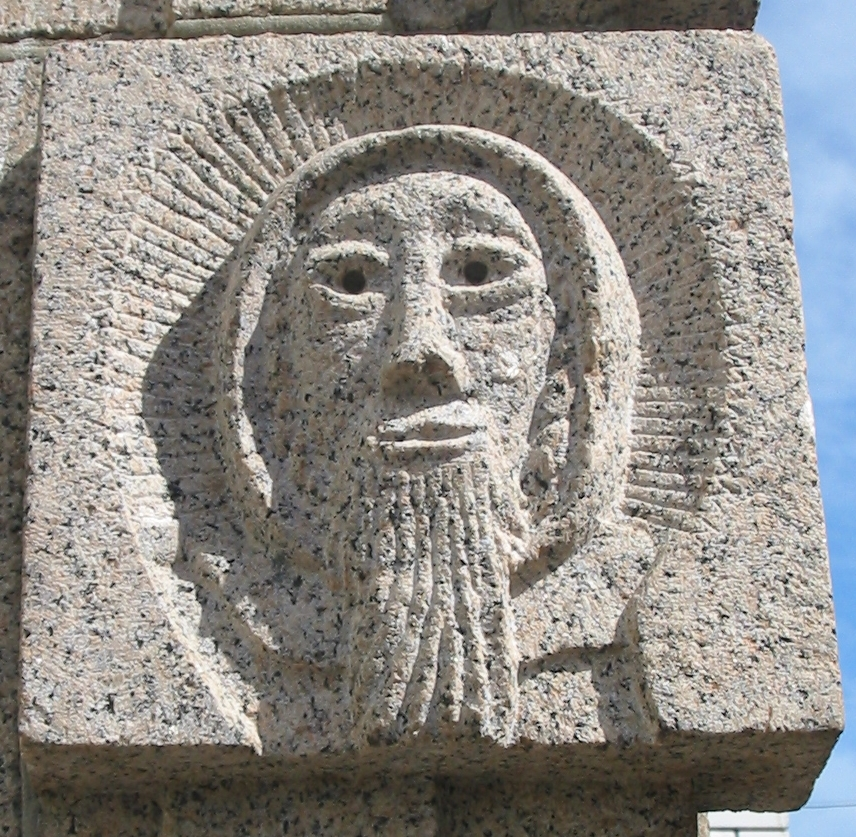
The face of St Helier as sculpted on the 1978 monument La Croix de la Reine in St Helier

St Helier is named after Helier (or Helerius), a 6th-century ascetic hermit from Belgium. The traditional date of his martyrdom is AD 555. His feast day, marked by an annual municipal and ecumenical pilgrimage to the Hermitage, is on 16 July.

The medieval hagiographies of Helier, the patron saint martyred in Jersey and after whom the parish and town are named, suggest a picture of a small fishing village on the dunes between the marshy land behind and the high-water mark.

An Abbey of Saint Helier was founded in 1155 on L'Islet, a tidal island adjacent to the Hermitage. Closed at the Reformation, the site of the abbey was fortified to create the castle that replaced Mont Orgueil as the island's major fortress. The new Elizabeth Castle was named after the Queen by the Governor of Jersey 1600–1603, Sir Walter Raleigh.

=== Early St Helier ===
The land now known as the town of St Helier was once not much more than a low-lying basin consisting of marshy lands and sand dunes (to the west), surrounded by low hills on other sides. There is very little evidence of prehistoric settlement in the St Helier basin; the archaeological site in the parish is an Iron Age dolmen, which used to sit atop Mont de la Ville (the present site of Fort Regent), but which was moved to the house of a former Governor in Henley-on-Thames in the 1780s. It is thought that the site of St Helier was settled at the time of the Roman control of Gaul.

By 540 AD, the monk Helerius (for whom the parish is named) had settled on the islet in the bay of St Aubin, now part of the parish and the modern-day site of Elizabeth Castle. From this hermitage, the monk converted the island's population to Christianity, but he was killed in 555 AD by seagoing raiders, attempting to defend the island. Therefore, his hermitage took on great spiritual significance. This establishment of Christianity as the principal religion of the islanders brought with it new governmental structures by the end of the 10th century, including the parochial system. It is believed the boundaries of the parish have not much changed since that time.

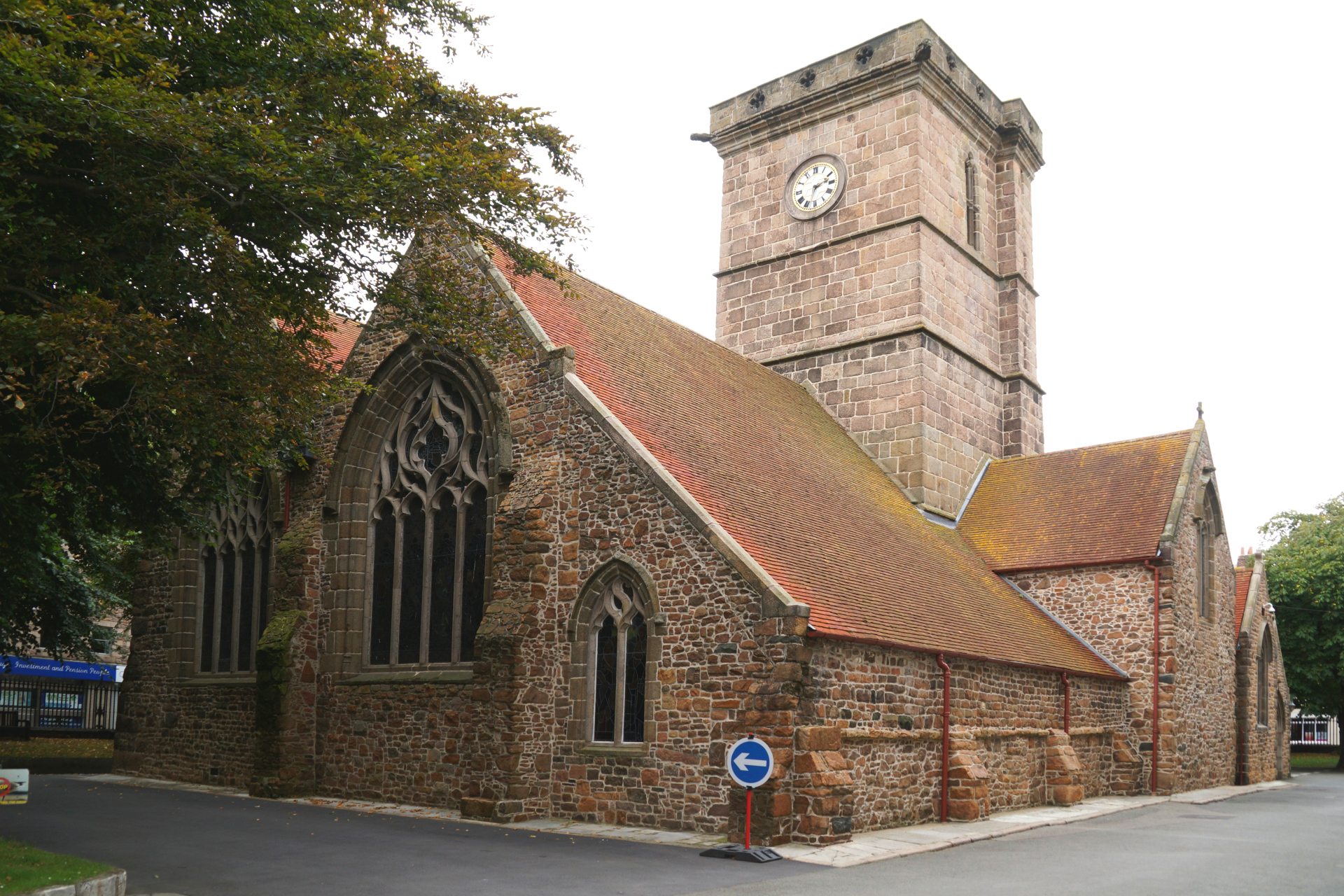
The Parish Church of St Helier

The first evidence for the existence of a settlement in St Helier is in the Assize Roll of 1229. However, the parish church, the Town Church, is known to contain features that date to at least the 11th century. Although it is now some considerable distance from the sea, at the time of its original construction it was on the edge of the dunes at the closest practical point to St Helier's Hermitage. Before land reclamation and port construction started, boats could be tied up to the churchyard wall on the seaward side.

It is believed the first residences in St Helier were along modern-day Hill Street, opposite the church. These would have been simple fishermen's huts, probably constructed from local granite with roofs of thatch. There is some archaeological evidence of 12th-century habitation around Old Street, outside the medieval town area. Another site of settlement was around the Town Mills at the base of Mont Nerou. Despite not having access to the site, the location of the Abbey and the Town Church led to the village developing into the main town for the insular community. Regular markets were held in the town from at least the 15th century and the Royal Court is recorded to have sat in St Helier from ancient times. The town gained formal recognition by the Privy Council by the mid-16th century.

The street layout of the medieval town is difficult to determine, as there are no detailed street maps. A 1563 map shows a group of buildings huddled behind the town church, with an axis - likely either King Street or the Royal Square - through the centre. It is believed that the Royal Square ("place du Marché"), which was initially the town's market square, became entirely encircled with buildings by 1550. At this time, the line of King Street ("rue de Derrière") and Queen Street ("rue du Milieu") were established, extending from Charing Cross ("la Pompe du bas", the outlet of Le Grand Douet) and Snow Hill ("Pompe de haut").

St Helier's growth has been marked by waves aligning with waves of migration to the island. The earliest such period of growth for the town seems to be between the Reformation and the Civil War as many French Protestants sought refuge in Jersey, Jersey being a Francophone Protestant state, especially following the Revocation of the Edict of Nantes in 1685. The first expansion of the old town was to the west. Jurat Helier Hue's lands to the north of Charing Cross were sold and developed as Hue Street and Dumaresq Street. John Seale bought lands near Charing Cross and developed Seale Street. The Vingtaine de la Ville officials confirmed their ownership of Mont de la Ville, so developed a new road La Rue des Trois Pigeons (Hill Street) to the south of the Royal Court.

By the start of the 17th century, the town consisted of the modern Royal Square, Hill Street, Regent Road, Church Street, King Street, Queen Street and little else. The eastern gateway to the town was Snow Hill, where the roads from the eastern parishes met, and the western gateway Charing Cross (which led to the market square down Broad Street), where King Street met the sandy plains over which Westerners would travel to come to town. Therefore, King Street and Queen Street formed the core axis for St Helier at this time. Approaches to the town included La Motte Street (for St Saviour), Val Plaisant onto Old Street (for the northern parishes and the Town Mill), and St John's Road. The land to the north and southeast of the old town were of considerable value, cultivated as market gardens or planted as orchards.

Improvements to take place during the 17th century included the walling of the Town Church cemetery, the construction of a prison (which arched over Charing Cross) and the paving of important streets. An order of the Royal Court in 1610 led to the improvement of the streets, proprietors being compelled to pave the space before his house to a width of 12 ft (3.7 m), leading to a non-uniform pattern of paving.

=== 18th century ===
In 1700, the cattle market was moved from Broad Street to a site on the beach, around 60 to 100 yards to the southwest of the churchyard (roughly the site of the Royal Yacht Hotel). It remained here until being relocated to the modern site of Minden Place Car Park in 1841.

La Cohue (a Norman word for courthouse) stood on one side of the Royal Square, now rebuilt as the Royal Court and States Chamber (called collectively the States Building). The market cross in the centre of the square was pulled down at the Reformation, and the iron cage for holding prisoners was replaced by a prison gatehouse at the western edge of town. The road now known as Broad Street served as the coast road for the town and may have also been referred to as La Rue d'Égypte being exposed to wind-blown sand. The Richmond Map of 1795 shows that the town at this period was only a small stub at the foot of Mont de la Ville, consisting of the main thoroughfare (La Rue de Derrière from Charing Cross through to La Colomberie) to the north of the Royal Square, at the time the town market. La Rue du Val and Old St John's Hill were the primary connections up to the north, with La Rue du Val connecting the town to its mill at Grands Vaux. In 1718, John Durell bought a number of St Helier fiefs and constructed a new gated street from King Street to Rue du Val. Maps show that the town experienced a steady increase in densification between 1700 and 1756.

Falle gives an account in the early 18th century of the state of the town

The Town in its present enlarged state, contains about 400 houses, laid out into several wide and well-paved streets. ... The Town is inhabited chiefly by merchants, shop-keepers ... and retailers of liquors; the landed gentlemen generally living upon their estates in the country. In short here is scarce anything wanting for necessity or convenience. Besides the stream running through the place [and literally under some houses] there is farther supply of good water from wells and pumps.

— Falle, c. 18th century

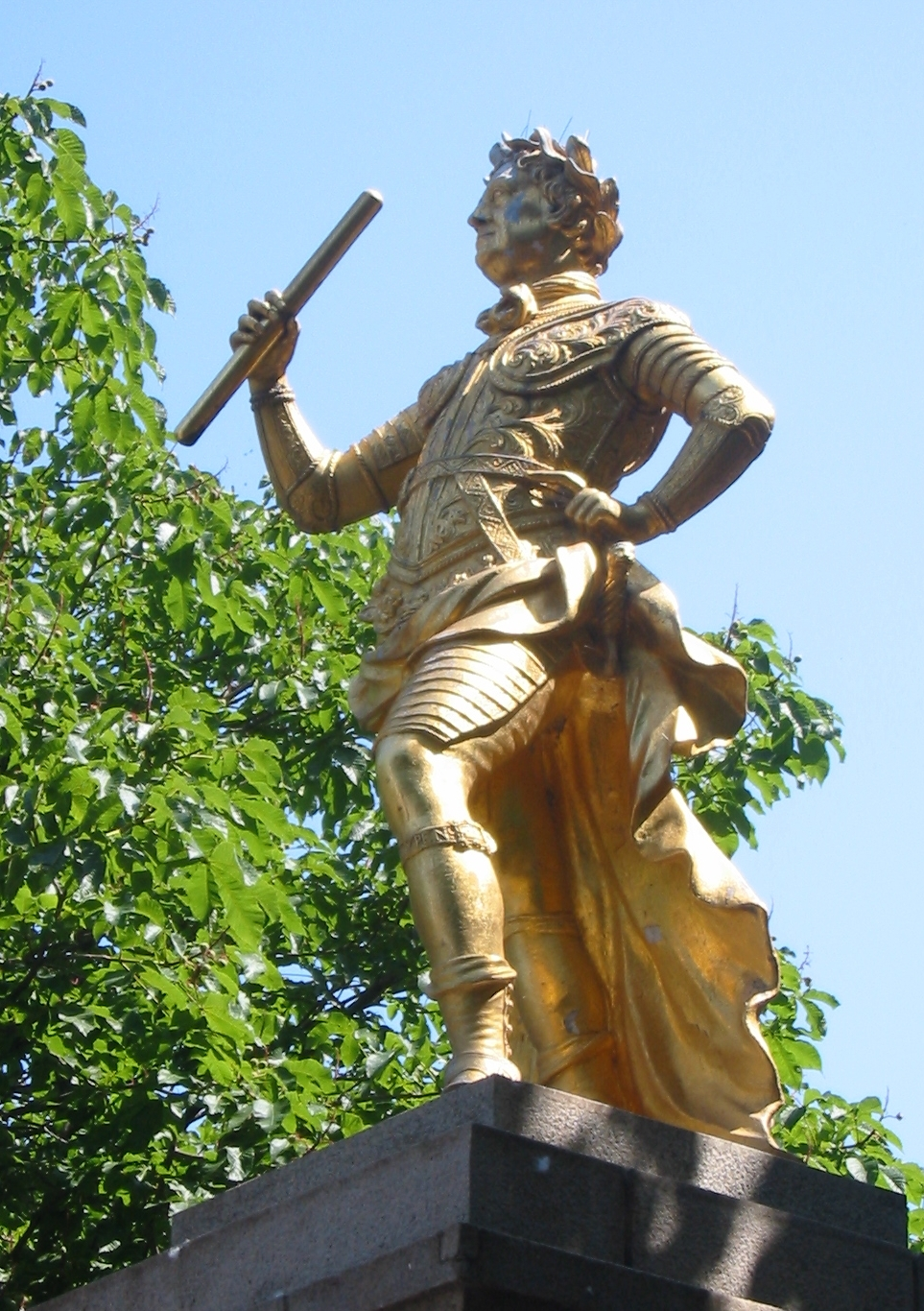
The statue of George II in the Royal Square is the zero milestone from which all distances in Jersey are measured.

George II gave £200 towards the construction of a new harbour – previously boats would be beached on a falling tide and unloaded by cart across the sands. A statue of the king by John Cheere was erected in the square in 1751 in gratitude, and the marketplace was renamed Royal Square, although the name has remained Lé Vièr Marchi (the old market) to this day in Jèrriais. Many of St Helier's road names and street names are bilingual English/French or English/Jèrriais, but some have only one name. The names in the various languages are not usually translations: distinct naming traditions survive alongside each other.

The Royal Square was also the scene of the Battle of Jersey on 6 January 1781, the last attempt by French forces to seize Jersey. John Singleton Copley's epic painting The Death of Major Peirson captures an imaginative version of the scene. Following the 1789 French Revolution, many thousands of French refugees settled in Jersey, many aristocratic and most settling in St Helier. This doubled the number of houses in town and its vicinity; many of the tree-lined lanes leading from the town became built up with new houses and streets.

As harbour construction moved development seaward, a population growth meant that marshland and pasture north of the ribbon of urban activity was built on speculatively. Settlement by English immigrants added quarters of colonial-style town houses to the traditional building stock.

Continuing military threats from France spurred the construction of a citadel fortress, Fort Regent, on the Mont de la Ville, the crag dominating the shallow basin of St Helier.

=== 19th century ===
Around 1800, the market was moved from the Royal Square to a new purpose-built and enlarged premises at its current site. This shifted the cultural core of the town out of its old medieval heart, but did not diminish the importance of the old centre, which also saw new works to the waterfront, such as the building of Commercial Buildings. Military roads linking coastal defences around the island with St Helier harbour allowed farmers to exploit Jersey's temperate micro-climate and use new fast sailing ships and then steamships to get their produce to the markets of London and Paris before the competition. This was the start of Jersey's agricultural prosperity in the 19th century.

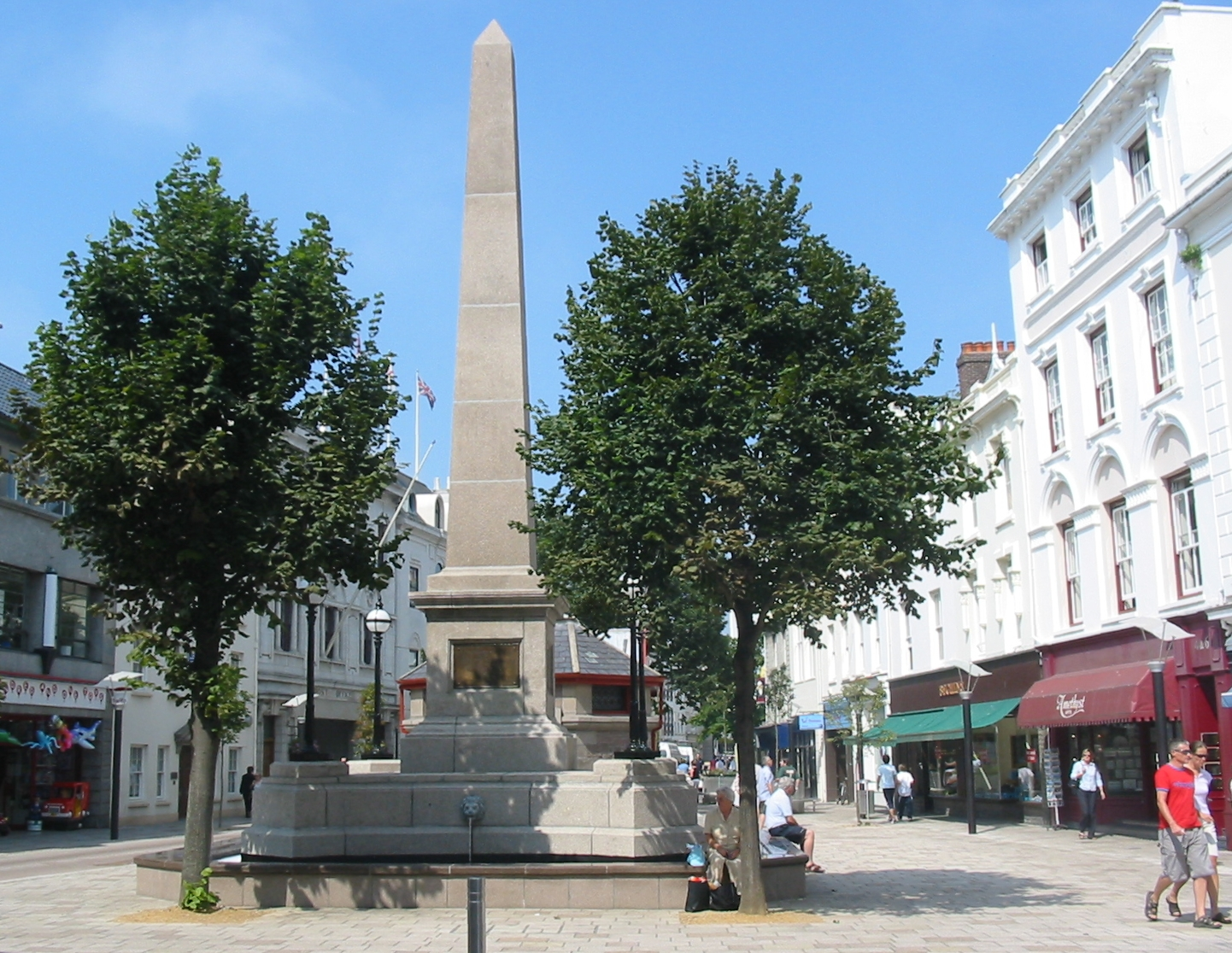
In 1855 an obelisk was constructed in Broad Street to commemorate the reformer Pierre Le Sueur, five times elected Constable of St Helier. The monument was restored in 2005 and the fountains restored to working order.

The Napoleonic Wars brought the threat of war to Jersey's shores, and the island was fortified against French invasion. Martello towers were constructed around the coast (including First Tower in St Helier) and in 1805, the States agreed to sell to the British government Mont de la Ville to site a major fort. The construction of the fort buildings led to a major influx of both people and capital, many of whom came from Ireland and England. The States used the proceeds of the sale of Mont de la Ville to fund improvements to town pavements.

The early 19th century was a period of growth of trade for Jersey. An English Custom House was established in the island in 1810. A key turning point in St Helier history was the introduction of steamships. Previous to that, travel to the island was long and unpredictable. In the mid-1820s, the post office switched to steam as well. The first paddle steamer to visit Jersey was the Medina on 11 June 1823. In 1824, two shipping companies were established, each operating weekly steamship services to England.

This brought thousands of passengers to the town. By 1840, there were 5,000 English residents in Jersey, who some say did not mix well or interact deeply with the native Jèrriais. The number of English-speaking soldiers stationed on the island and the number of retired officers and English-speaking labourers who came to the islands in the 1820s led to the island gradually moving towards an English-speaking culture in St Helier. This new immigration had a large impact on local architecture, with a number of mainland Georgian-style houses and terraces erected on the main roads out of the town. It also expanded with many new streets, such as Burrard Street, first developed in 1812. In 1831, gas street lighting was first introduced on town roads.

The rapid growth of St Helier was one of the most significant changes in the landscape of Jersey during the 19th century. The town developed from a small settlement by the coast to encompassing most of the parish and spreading out into St Clement and St Saviour. The town's expansion mainly happened in the semi-saucer of flat land between Westmount and Mount Pleasant, so there remained a significant rural part of the parish. In 1776, both St Aubin and St Helier had had roughly the same size; however, by the end of the 19th century, St Helier was far larger. It is estimated that the number of houses by the mid-19th century was 2,600, 2,000 higher than just sixty years prior.

An important growth for St Helier in the early 19th century was the construction of the harbour. Previously, ships coming into the town had only a small jetty at the site now called the English Harbour and the French Harbour. The Chamber of Commerce urged the States to build a new harbour, but the States refused, so the Chamber took it into their own hands and paid to upgrade the harbour in 1790. A new breakwater was constructed to shelter the jetty and harbours. In 1814, the merchants constructed the roads now known as Commercial Buildings and Le Quai des Marchands to connect the harbours to the town and in 1832 construction was finished on the Esplanade and its sea wall. A rapid expansion in shipping led the States in 1837 to order the construction of two new piers: the Victoria and Albert Piers.

Pierre Le Sueur, reforming constable of St Helier, was responsible for installing sewerage and provision of clean water in St Helier following outbreaks of cholera in the 1830s. An obelisk with a fountain in the town centre was raised to his memory following his premature death in office from overwork.

In the second half of the 19th century, hundreds of trucks laden with potatoes and other export produce needed access to the harbour. This prompted a programme of road-widening which swept away many of the ancient buildings of the town centre. Pressure for redevelopment has meant that very few buildings remain in urban St Helier which date to before the 19th century, giving the town primarily a Regency or Victorian character.

Towards the end of the century, in the 1870s, the new Jersey Railway opened, connecting the town to the West, with its terminus at the Weighbridge, and a few years later the Eastern Railway, with its terminus at Snow Hill. By this time, the town had two parks: the Parade Gardens, and West Park (now commonly known as People's Park). Until the opening of the Waterfront and Millenium Parks in the late 20th and early 21st centuries, these parks would be the only three to exist in the town basin.

The expansion of the town during the 19th century also caused an expansion of social facilities, particularly of churches, due to the importance of religion. These 19th-century churches include St James' Church (1829), St Mark's Church (1843), Wesley Street Methodist Chapel (1827, rebuilt in 1876) and St Thomas' Catholic Church (1887).

=== 20th century ===
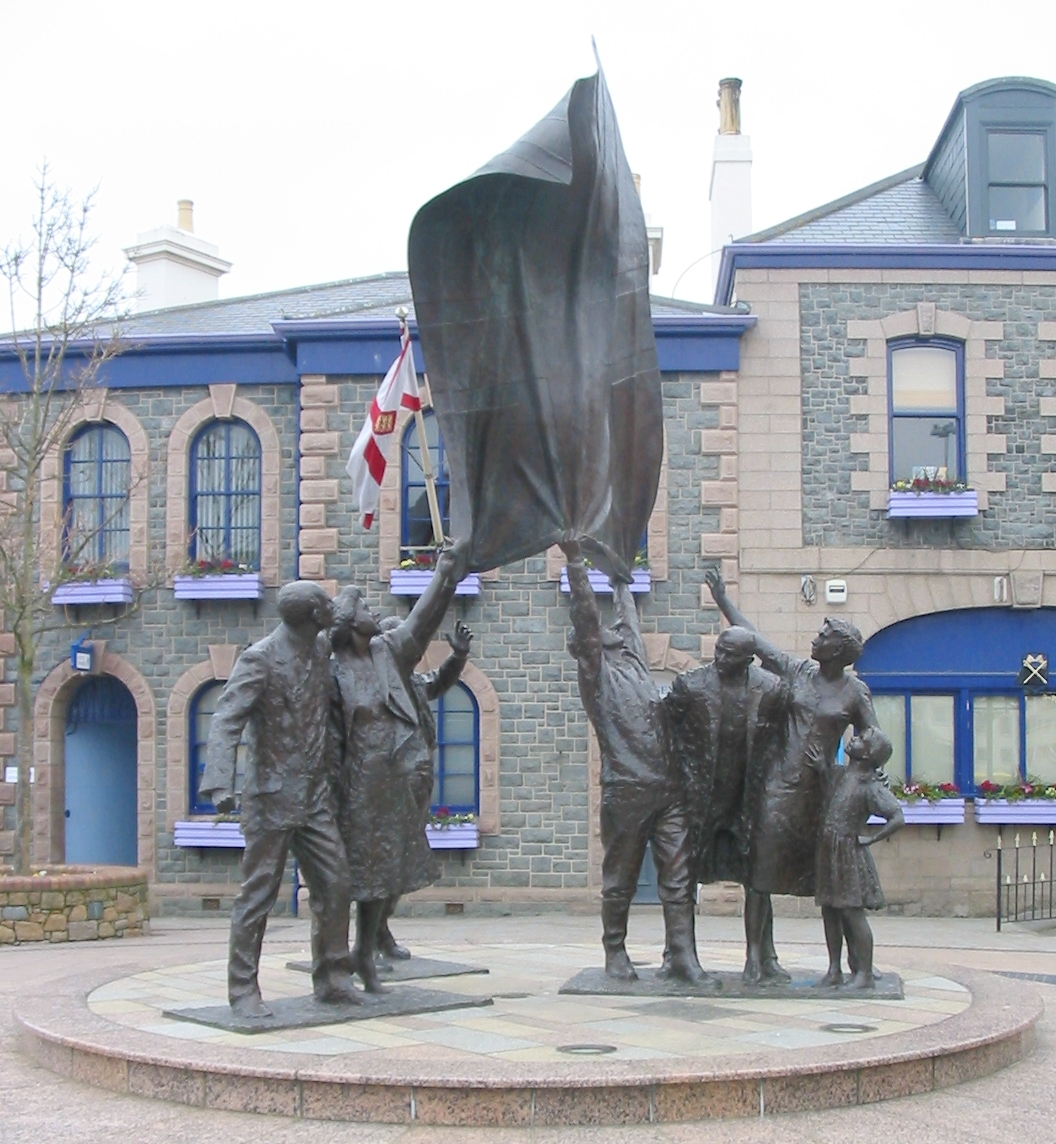
A statue celebrating the island's liberation from Nazi occupation

By the turn of the century, all the large open spaces around St Helier were mostly developed. Most new buildings involved maximising the density of a plot, joining smaller plots to form larger premises (especially in order to retailize the heart of town). After the First World War, the need for new homes could not be met in the confines of the basin, and with the growth of the motorcar, the roads leading out into the country allowed ribbon development in all directions, along the coast, up over the hills and into neighbouring parishes. In the 1930s, the States constructed the first-ever public housing estate in Jersey at Wellington Park.

After the German occupation of the Channel Islands, St Helier continued to change as a result of renewed tourism industry and Jersey's role as a financial centre. A large change was the unprecedented movement of people around the island thanks to the motor car, which required higher capacity on the old road network and more parking. In the 1960s, income from the Jersey States Lottery was used to excavate a two-lane road tunnel under Fort Regent, enabling traffic from the harbour to the east coast towns to avoid a tortuous route around the fort.

A number of architecturally and historically significant buildings have been destroyed since the Second World War, including the demolishing of one of the oldest townhouses the Manoir de la Motte, located on the corner of Grosvenor Street and St James Street, the site where Lt-Governor Corbet surrendered to the French during the Battle of Jersey. A heritage architecture preservation movement grew, partly due to the destruction of a number of historic buildings in the Hue/Dumaresq Street area. This led to increased planning restrictions aimed to preserve the town's architectural heritage and preservation of the town's character has become a key part of Jersey's national planning policy. About the same time, Fort Regent was converted into a major leisure facility and was linked to the town centre by a gondola cableway, which was closed and demolished in the 1990s. In the 1970s, a programme of pedestrianisation of the central streets was undertaken.

=== 21st century ===
In 2006, it was reported that the connétable, with the backing of the Chief Minister of Jersey, was to seek city status for St Helier.

An explosion at a block of flats in Pier Road on 10 December 2022 killed at least eight people. The initial assumption is that it was caused by a gas leak.

== Politics and government ==
=== Municipality ===
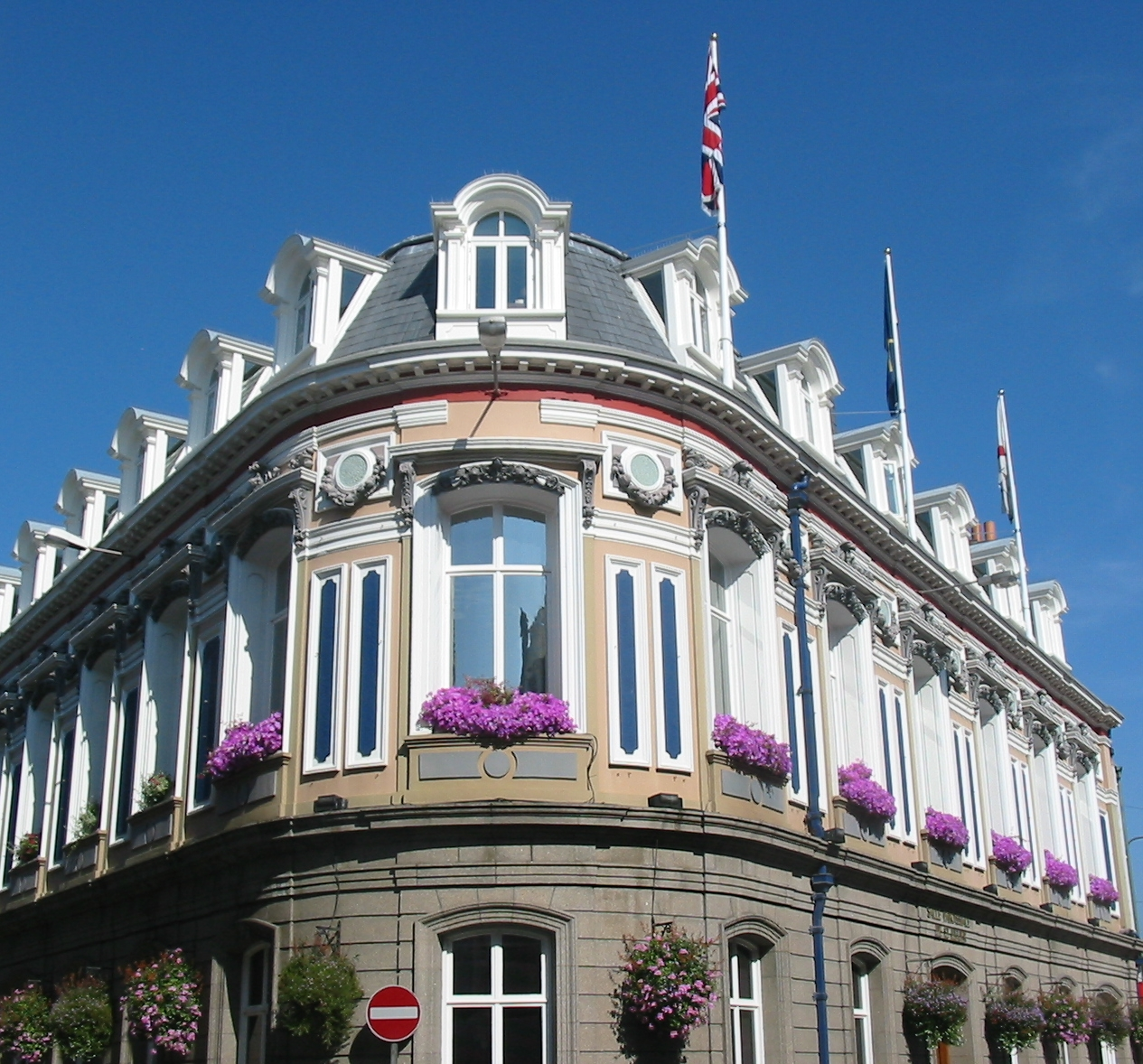
St Helier Town Hall

The parish has its own responsibilities, and elections to the municipality of St Helier take place to elect honorary officials who fulfill a variety of roles for parishioners under the overall control of the constable, two procureurs du bien public and the parish assembly. Elected officials are supported by a paid administration within the parish.

Five members of the Roads Committee and ten roads inspectors are also elected by parishioners and ensure that the roads of the parish are kept in good repair. The members of the Assessment Committee are elected to agree to the rate chargeable to each property in the parish. The Accounts Committee are elected to ensure that the accounts of the Parish represent a 'true and fair view' of the state of the parish finances in order that the Parish Assembly may rely upon the information to set the parish rate. As with the other parishes, St Helier has an honorary police force.

The parish is divided into vingtaines for administrative purposes:

- La Vingtaine de la Ville
  - Canton de Bas de la Vingtaine de la Ville
  - Canton de Haut de la Vingtaine de la Ville
- La Vingtaine du Rouge Bouillon
- La Vingtaine de Bas du Mont au Prêtre
- La Vingtaine de Haut du Mont au Prêtre
- La Vingtaine du Mont à l'Abbé
- La Vingtaine du Mont Cochon

==== Conseil Municipal ====
The Conseil Municipal is a new municipal council for St Helier. The idea of creating a council was first floated in 1892; however, the idea was not put into place until November 2019, when it was agreed to establish a Shadow Conseil to trial the idea in 2020. The idea is to help the Parish to deliver the parish objectives.

It is composed of:

- The Constable
- The procureurs du bien public
- Roads Committee members
- One elected youth member
- Four other members to be elected

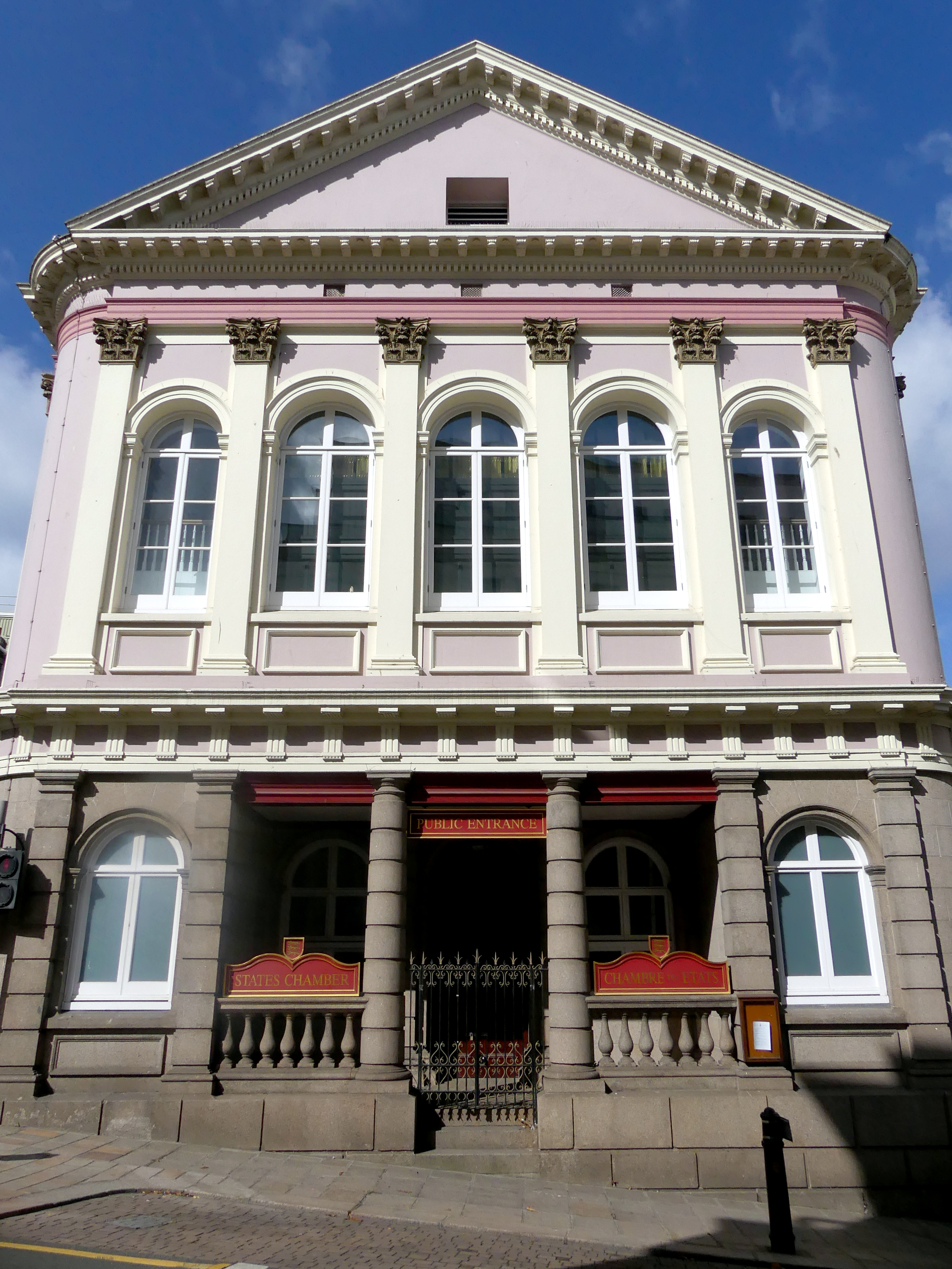
The States Building, the island's parliamentary building, is located in St Helier.

=== States representation ===
At present, the parish forms three electoral districts for States Assembly elections and elects 13 Deputies and the parish's Connétable, who sits in the States ex oficio. The current Deputies for St Helier are listed below.

Electoral districts of St Helier
District	Vigntaines	States members
Whole parish for Connétable		Simon Crowcroft
North	Vingtaine du Mont Cochon; Vingtaine du Mont à l'Abbé; Vingtaine de Haut du Mont au Prêtre	Inna Gardiner; Mary Le Hegarat; Max Andrews; Steve Ahier
Central	Vingtaine de Bas du Mont au Prêtre; Vingtaine du Rouge Bouillon	Carina Alves; Catherine Curtis; Lyndsay Feltham; Robert Ward
South	Vingtaine de la Ville	Beatriz Porée; David Warr; Geoff Southern; Sam Mézec; Tom Coles

=== Capital city ===
St Helier is the de facto capital of Jersey as the main town and seat of both the civil government and legal system, though the seat of the Crown is Government House, St Saviour. The States Assembly – the legislative body – meets at the States Chamber, next to the Royal Court – the highest court of the island's judicial system. Both are based in the Royal Square. The executive is based temporarily at offices in Broad Street. New offices are being constructed at Cyril Le Marquand House on the Parade. As foreign relations are the responsibility of the UK, St Helier does not host any foreign embassies, though there are a number of honorary consulates for foreign governments with links to the island (e.g. France and Portugal) based in the town.

== Geography ==
St Helier is one of the twelve parishes of Jersey and is the most populated of them. It is located on the island's south coast, on the eastern end of St Aubin's Bay. It covers the majority, and the principal part of, the island's principal settlement (henceforth referred to as "the town"). A large part of the parish is rural.

The town has no clearly defined boundary and does not directly match any parish boundaries. The 2011 Island Plan defines the built-up area as including a large part of the Southern part of the parish (the contiguous built-up area within the parish, notably excluding parts of Mont à l'Abbé, Le Mont au Prêtre, Grands Vaux, and St Andrews), a part of St Saviour (however not the Five Oaks area, despite being part of the contiguous urban area) and the Georgetown-Plat Douet area of St Saviour and St Clement. Most of the town is located on low-lying land, consisting of escarpment and flood plain.

The town's centre is located entirely within the Parish of St Helier, and mostly consists of the area surrounding King Street and Queen Street. It also contains key buildings such as St Helier Town Hall and the States Building.

The parish has a population of 33,522 and a land area of 10.6 km^{2}, making it the densest parish on the island.

The topography of the parish is one of the most varied. The marshland on which the town is situated is encircled by highlands which protect the town from the worst winds. In the southeast of the parish, rising from the plains in the centre of town is Mont de Ville and Mount Bingham which divide the Havre des Pas district from the harbour.

Le Grand Douet runs underneath the parish from the north near Grands Vaux, out near the Underpass (pictured below).

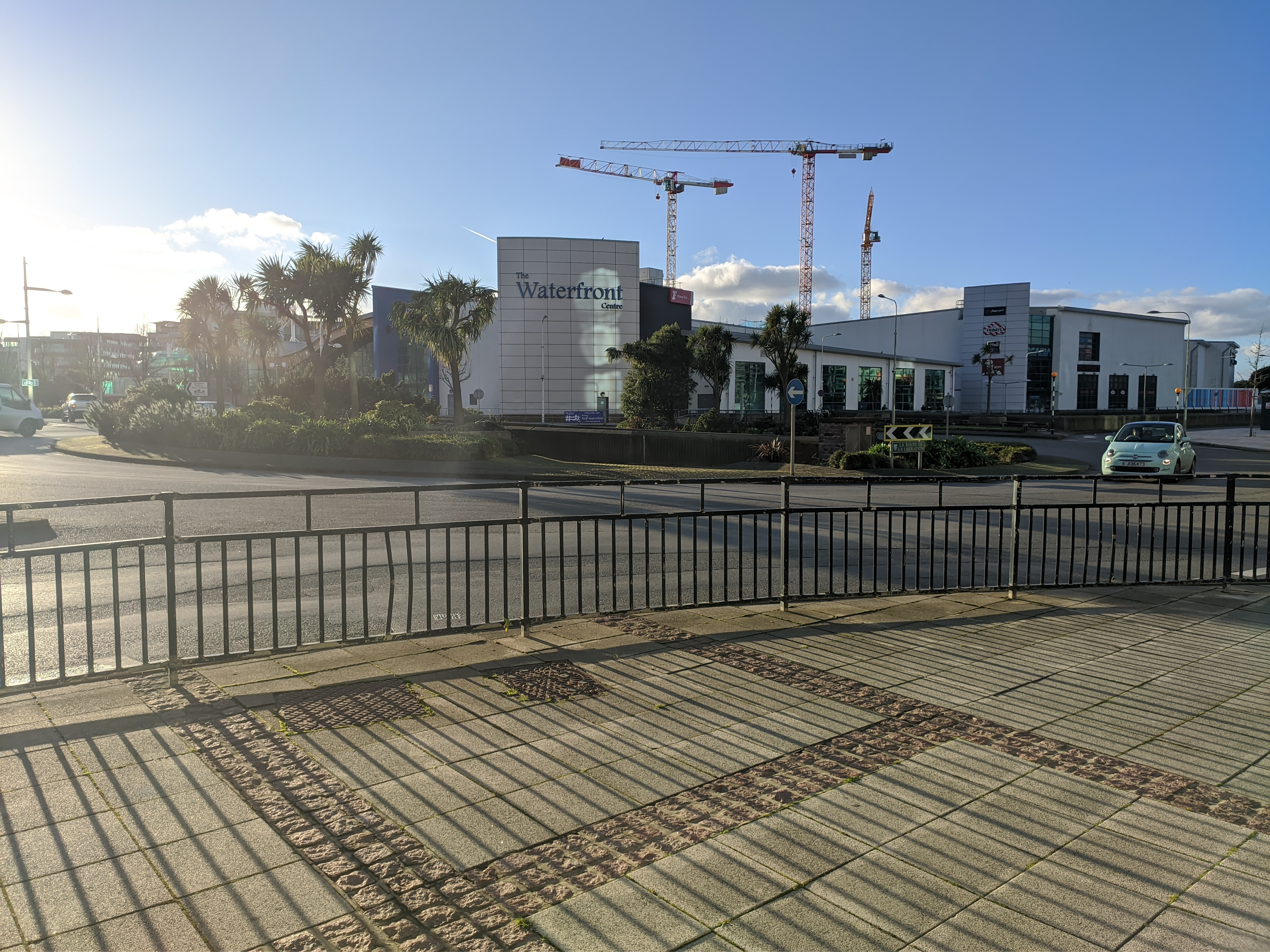
The Waterfront Centre was constructed on land reclaimed in the 1980s.

Since the 1980s, a significant reclamation project has extended the southern area of St Helier – the area now known as the Waterfront. The A1 dual carriageway was upgraded and extended, with a new grade-separated roundabout junction, the first in the Channel Islands.

=== Architecture ===
The town is not particularly visible from the island's countryside due to the town's position in a sheltering landscape. The parish has a number of character areas:

- West Esplanade and Elizabeth Castle is defined by extensive panoramic views of St Aubin's Bay and the sea and architecturally dominated by Elizabeth Castle.
- La Collette consists of mostly reclaimed ground surrounded on three sides by the sea. Its primary usage is industrial and it holds the iconic landmark of La Collette power station chimney, visible across St Helier.
- Havre des Pas is one of the most distinctive and pleasant areas of the town. Predominantly historical architecture with a seaside town flavour.
- Fort Regent – its silhouette is one of the most recognisable images of St Helier. It is an iconic landmark, significant historic site, and major leisure facility.
- Old Harbours has a distinctive identity as a historic harbour area, with open public spaces such as Liberation Square. The piers and harbour structures originate from the early 19th century.
- New Waterfront – on mostly reclaimed land. Distinguishable from the rest of town, consisting of contemporary architecture and a lack of traditional street layout. Home to a leisure centre, modern apartments and office spaces, and several green spaces.
- The Parade and Esplanade is the historic built edge of the town. A mix of historic, post-war and modern buildings. It hosts the General Hospital and the Parade Gardens.
- Town Centre Core, the civic heart of St Helier, has a network of pedestrianised streets and public spaces, as well as a number of significant landmarks.
- Town Centre North is predominantly residential, home to St Thomas' Church, Springfield Stadium, and the Millenium Town Park.
- Town Centre Edges and Slopes hosts predominantly suburban low-density residential, with a notable landmark being Victoria College.

=== Climate ===
Under the Köppen climate classification, St Helier has an oceanic climate (Köppen: Cfb), with cool, unsettled winters and pleasant, quite sunny summers.

Summers on the island are mild to warm, breezy and often sunny. Heatwaves that the UK and mainland Europe experience do occur, but are less frequent and slightly less intense due to sea breezes. As the island is more subject to influence from the Azores High during summer compared with Great Britain, sunshine hours are higher due to the suppression of cumulus and stratocumulus cloud formation. This is consolidated by the surrounding ocean being relatively cool compared with the nearby land, creating a stable marine layer. Thunderstorms or severe weather are uncommon in this period, but can be sparked by a Spanish Plume event.

The hottest temperature ever recorded in St Helier was 39.3°C (102.7°F) on 25 June 2026, which beat the previous record of 37.9°C (100.2°F) set on 18 July 2022. The coldest temperature ever recorded was -10.3°C (13.5°F), which was measured in 1894.

Rainfall is plentiful in autumn and winter but modest in spring and summer, with July being the driest month. Significant extratropical cyclones can affect the island during the autumn and winter period, the most damaging in recent times being the Great Storm of 1987 and Storm Ciarán, the latter of which produced an exceptionally destructive tornado that damaged eastern suburbs of St Helier in November 2023.

Winters on the island tend to be milder than in mainland Britain, being greatly moderated by the surrounding ocean. Snowfall and frost are unusual and have become rarer in recent decades. There are exceptions to this rule however; given the islands close proximity to continental Europe, a southeasterly wind component in tandem with a land breeze can import very cold continental air. The last significant snowfall was on 9 January 2024.

January is the coldest month with an average high of 9 °C (48 °F), and a low of 5 °C (41 °F). July is the warmest month, with an average high of 21 °C (70 °F), and a low of 14 °C (57 °F).

Sunshine hours are noticeably higher than in mainland UK and northern France averaging 2080 hours per year compared to 1670 hours in London. St Helier also set the record for the most sunshine ever reported in one calendar year in the British Isles.

Climate data for Saint Helier 54m asl, 1991-2020
Month	Jan	Feb	Mar	Apr	May	Jun	Jul	Aug	Sep	Oct	Nov	Dec	Year
Mean daily maximum °C (°F)	9.4 (48.9)	9.3 (48.7)	11.7 (53.1)	14.4 (57.9)	17.0 (62.6)	19.4 (66.9)	21.9 (71.4)	21.9 (71.4)	20.3 (68.5)	16.3 (61.3)	12.6 (54.7)	10.6 (51.1)	15.4 (59.7)
Mean daily minimum °C (°F)	6.2 (43.2)	5.4 (41.7)	6.3 (43.3)	7.7 (45.9)	10.4 (50.7)	12.8 (55.0)	14.5 (58.1)	15.0 (59.0)	13.8 (56.8)	11.7 (53.1)	9.4 (48.9)	8.0 (46.4)	10.1 (50.2)
Average rainfall mm (inches)	95 (3.7)	72 (2.8)	63 (2.5)	55 (2.2)	54 (2.1)	50 (2.0)	43 (1.7)	52 (2.0)	65 (2.6)	105 (4.1)	107 (4.2)	110 (4.3)	871 (34.2)
Average rainy days (≥ 1.0 mm)	5.9	4.4	2.9	3.3	3.0	2.7	0.5	1.9	3.4	4.5	5.5	5.7	43.7
Mean monthly sunshine hours	70.3	116.0	170.8	198.9	268.7	242.9	278.8	255.0	192.4	127.4	89.6	72.4	2,083.2
Source: Infoclimat

== Demography ==
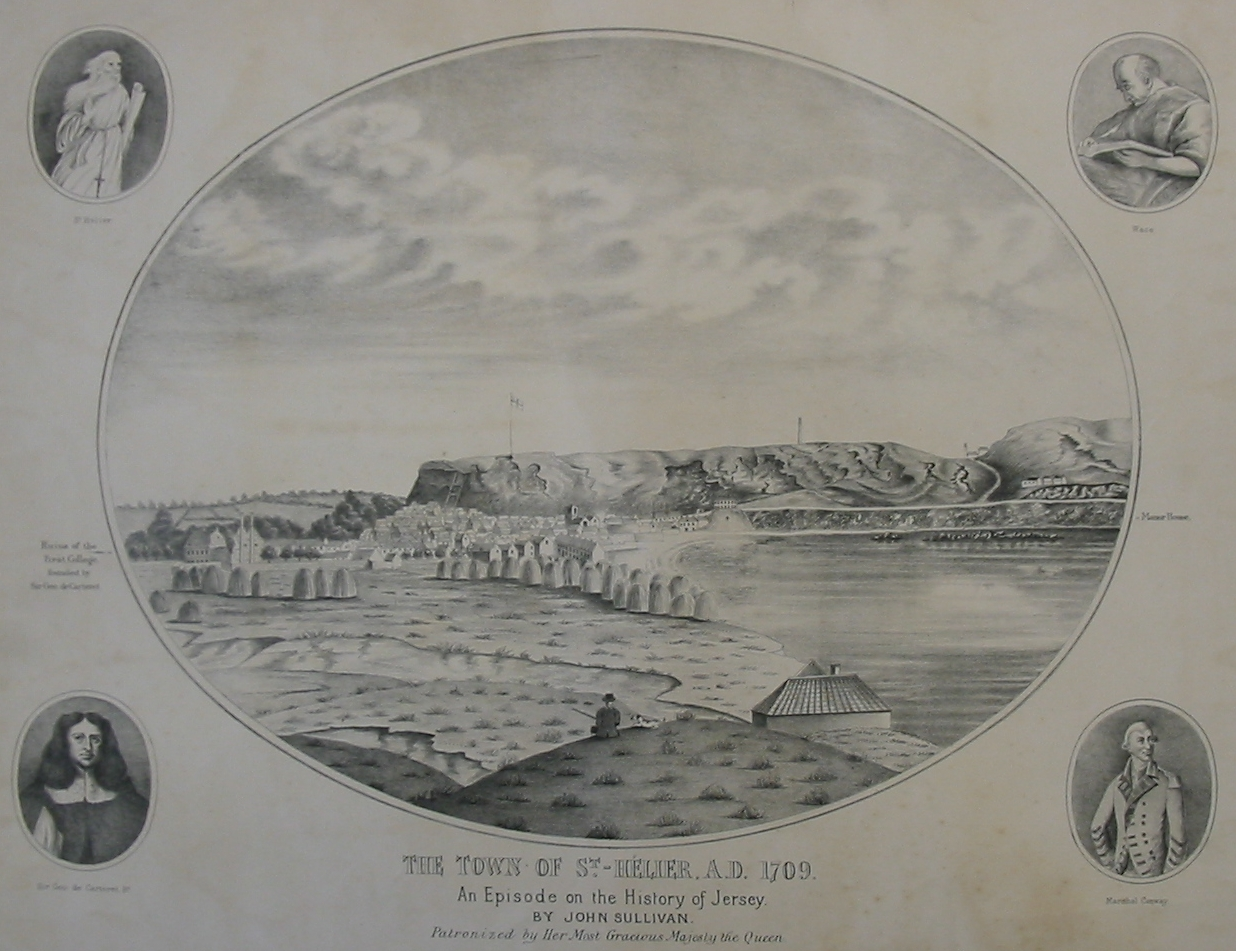
A depiction of the Town of St Helier as it was in 1709

St Helier is the most populated of Jersey's parishes, with 33,522 residents according to the 2011 census.

Historical population
Year	Pop.	±%
1991	28,123	—
1996	27,523	−2.1%
2001	28,310	+2.9%
2011	33,522	+18.4%
2021	35,822	+6.9%

== Culture ==
St Helier contains cultural facilities at the Jersey Museum, the Maritime Museum, the Jersey Opera House, the Jersey Arts Centre, the performance venue of St James, the sports and entertainment facilities at Fort Regent, the Jersey Library, the library of La Société Jersiaise and the Jersey Archive.

The parish has hosted the Jersey Battle of Flowers carnival since 1902.

== Media ==
The BBC has its regional centre in the town. It is the base of BBC Radio Jersey and for BBC Channel Islands regional programmes, the complex contains studios and offices. ITV Channel Television is also based in St Helier and broadcasts the regional programme, ITV News Channel TV on ITV1. Channel 103 is an Independent Local Radio station. The local newspaper is the Jersey Evening Post, which is printed six days a week, and has been in publication since 1890.

== Public squares and parks ==
=== The Weighbridge ===
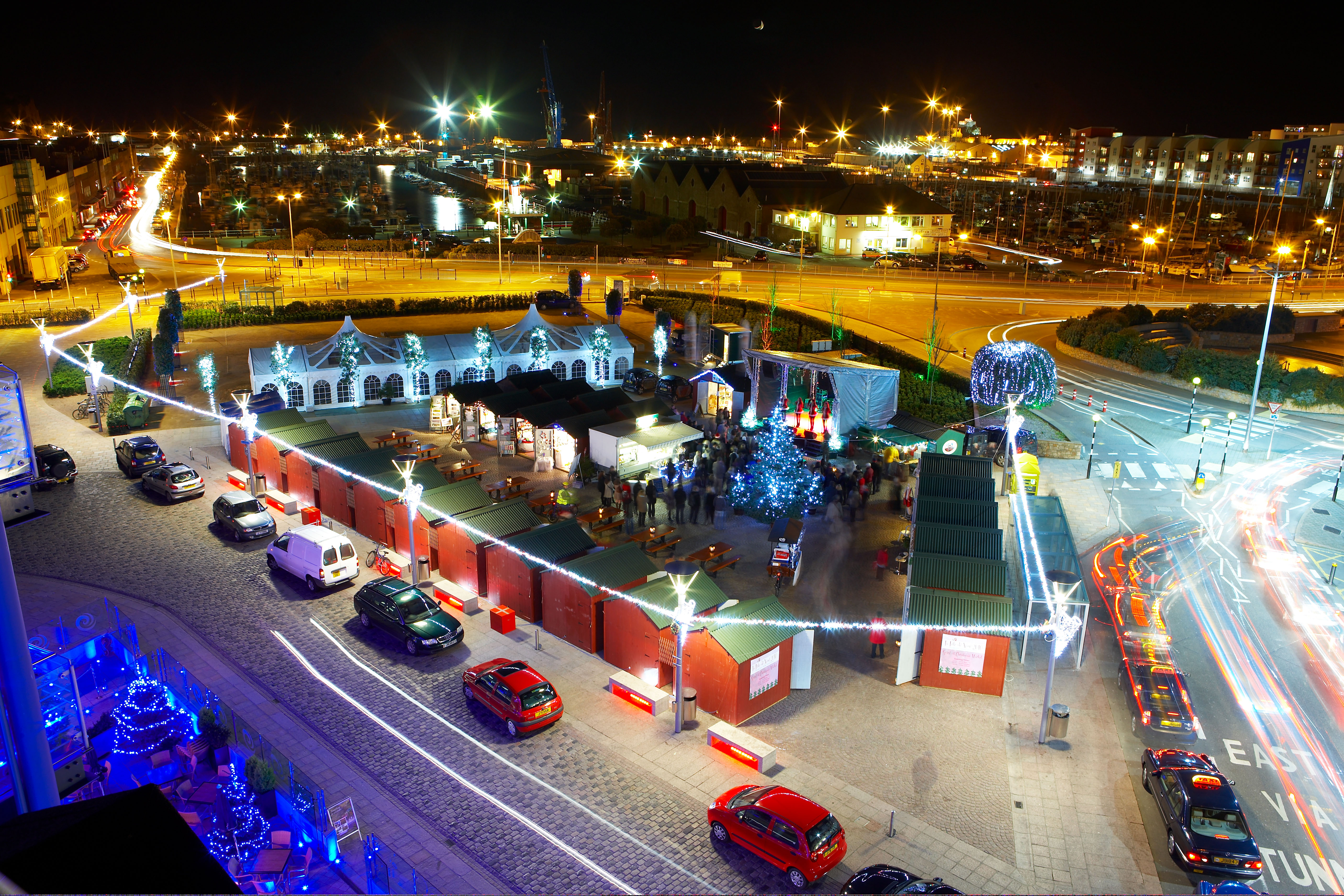
The Fete dé Noué Christmas Market in the Weighbridge in 2010

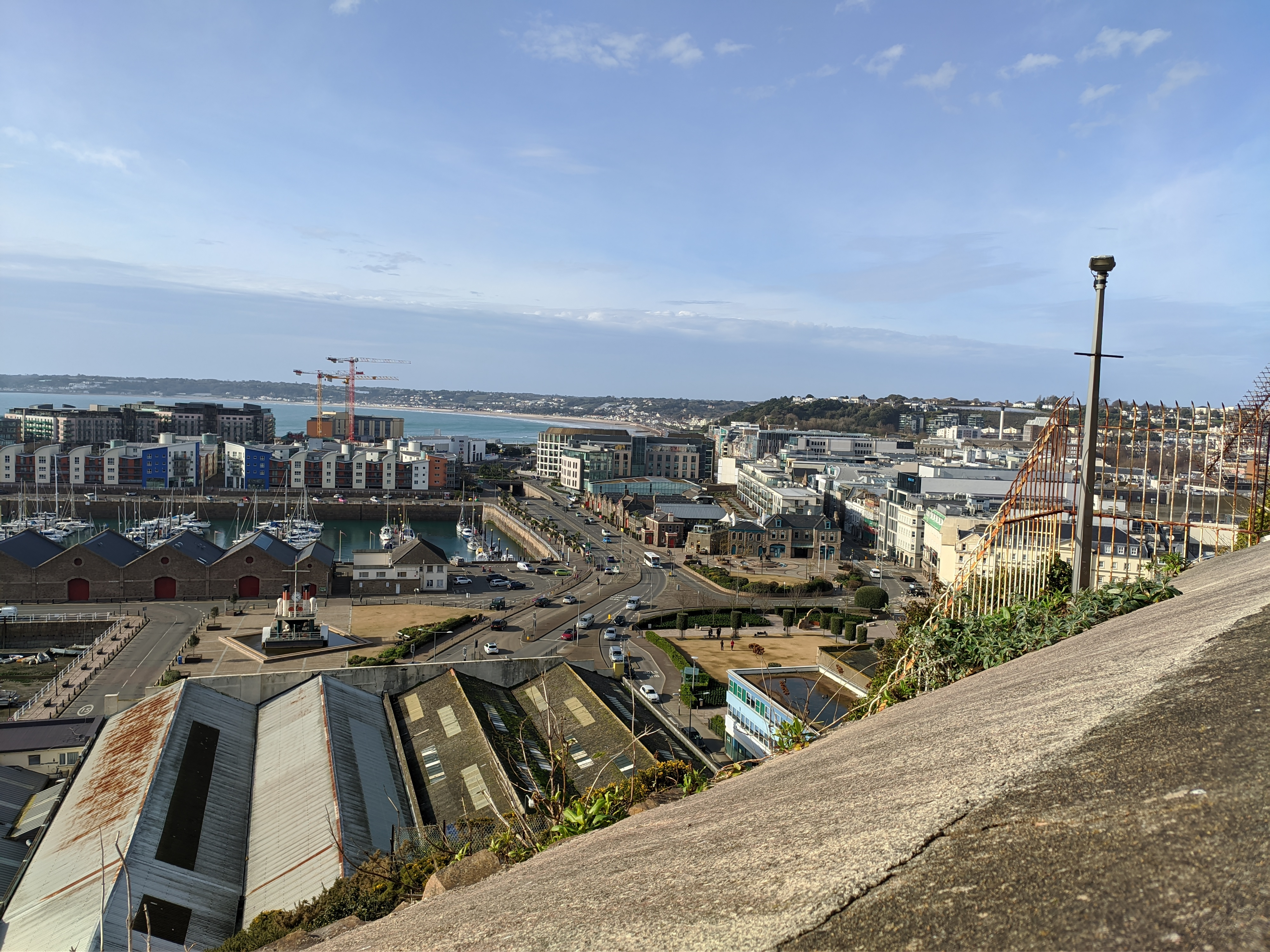
A view over the Weighbridge

The Weighbridge is a public space in the south of town. The modern space consists of three squares, trisected by La Route de la Libération and the Esplanade. The Weighbridge is notable for being the site of the Liberation of Jersey, when British soldiers raised the Union Flag at the Pomme d'Or Hotel, bringing a return to British rule in the island after five years under Nazi occupation.

In 1995, to celebrate the 50th anniversary of Jersey's liberation from Nazi occupation, and thus 50 years of peace, a sculpture was erected in the focal point for the celebrations when the island was liberated.

The sculpture was originally to depict islanders releasing doves of peace, but this came under fierce criticism, with some islanders remarking that had any doves been on the island during the occupation, they would have been eaten by starving German soldiers. Therefore, the sculpture was revised to show islanders raising the British flag, as they had done on the day of liberation 50 years previous.

The site is on reclaimed land and has served many purposes over the years. The initial weighbridge was constructed in 1825. The town terminus of the Jersey Railway was opened here in 1870. A statue of Queen Victoria was initially located in what is now Weighbridge Place (it has been relocated to Victoria Park at West Park). This area also served as the island's bus terminus until the opening of Liberation Station in 2005.

In the 1990s, Liberation Square was built in front of the Pomme D'Or for the 50th anniversary of Liberation. It features a statue of islanders holding up a Union Flag. The circular forms of the square represent free thought and liberation. There is a moat around the statue representing the sea and twelve representing the parishes of the island.

=== The Parade ===
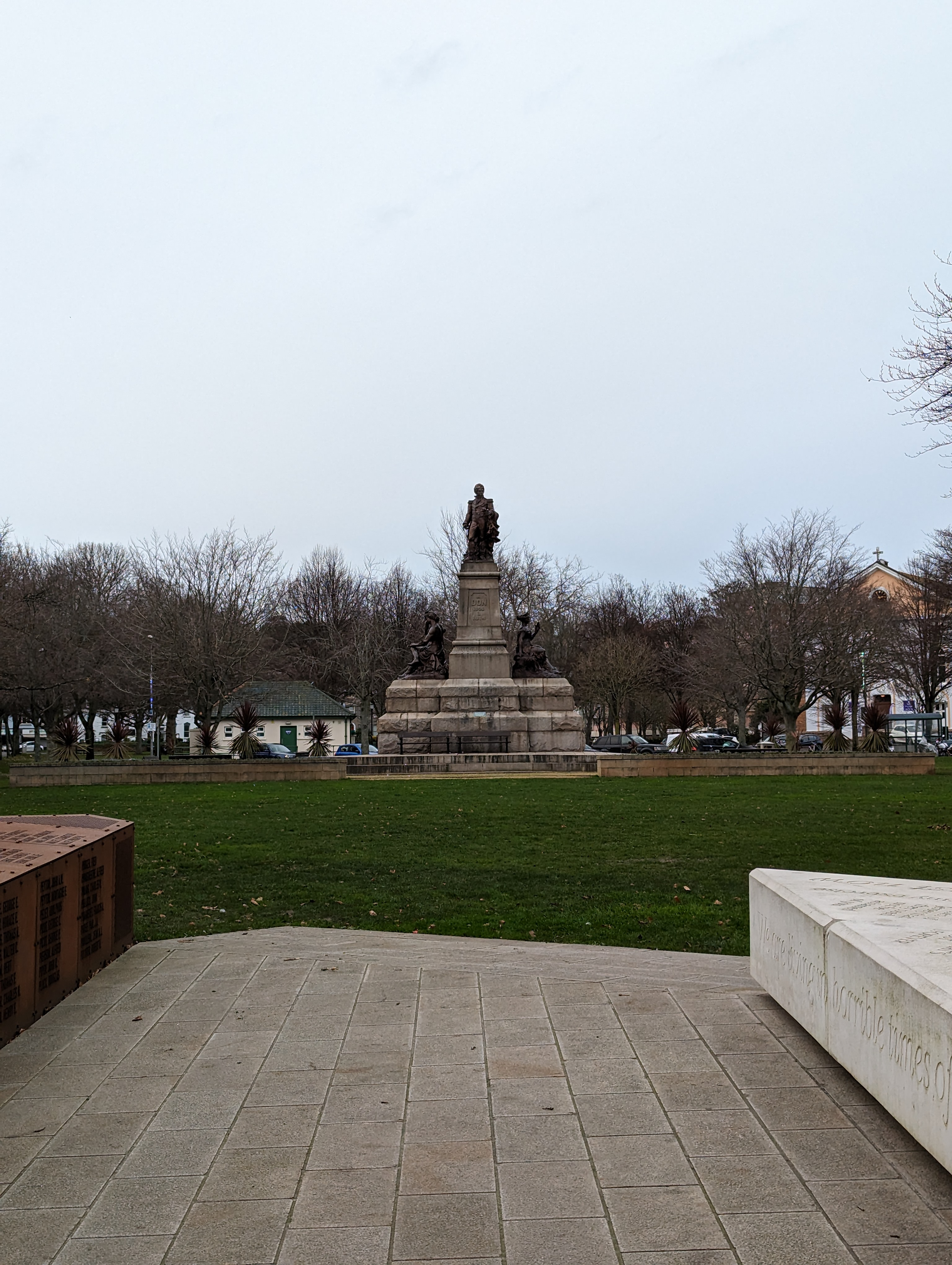
The statue of former Governor Don in Parade Gardens

The Parade is a wide area in the west of St Helier, incorporating a park in the centre and roads around most of the edges. The area is home to the Cenotaph and General Hospital. It is known as Les Mielles in Jèrriais, meaning sand dunes.

It was initially a drilling ground for the island's troops. The original hospital building was completed in 1768, but was originally used as barracks. The Cenotaph was constructed in 1923 to commemorate those islanders who lost their lives in the First World War (however has also been expanded to the Second World War), designed by Charles de Gruchy. It is the focal site for Rememebrance Day celebrations on the island.

=== Millennium Town Park ===
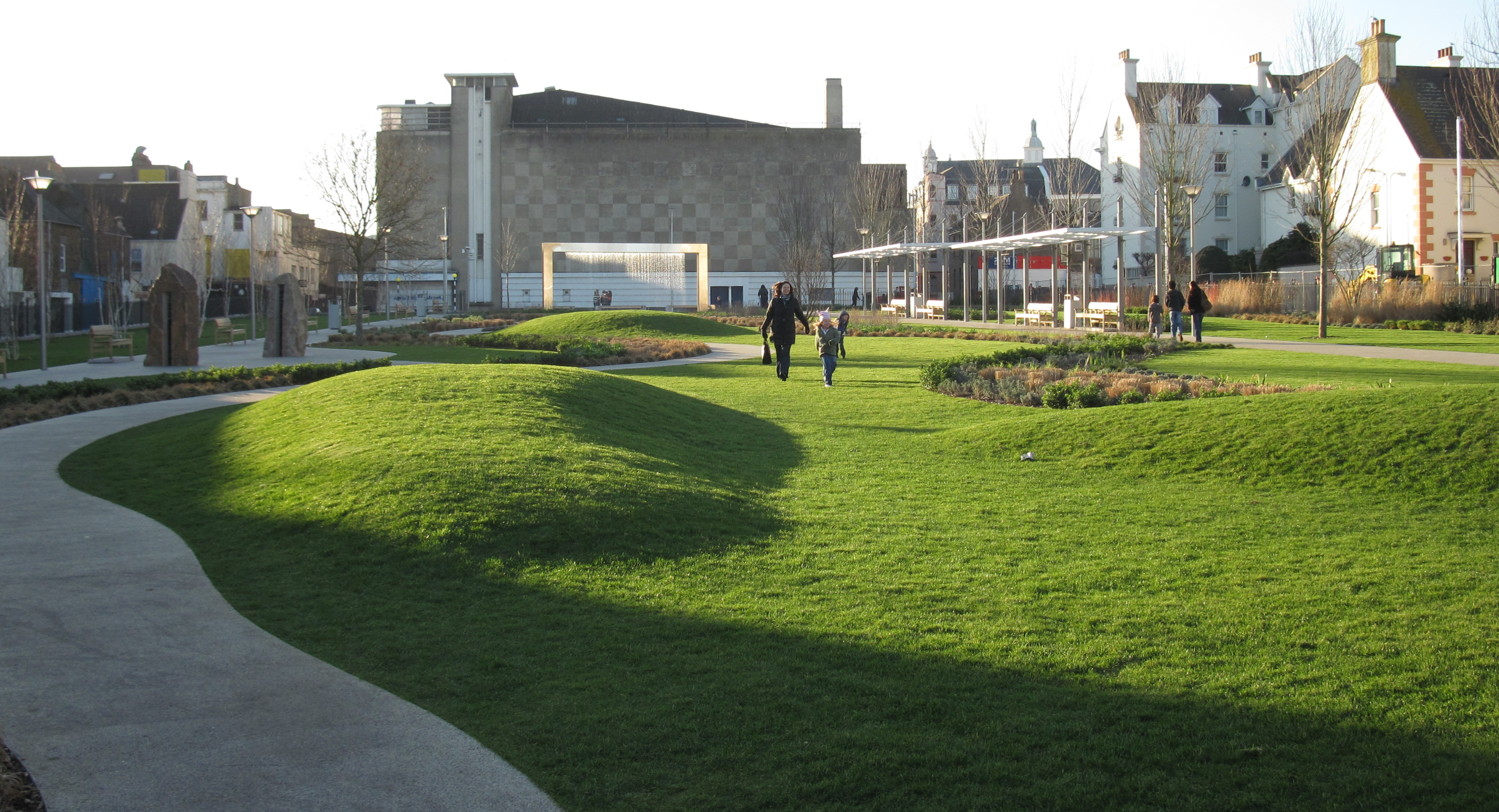
Millenium Park in 2012

This is the newest park in St Helier, opened on a former car park site in 2011. Its creation was initially agreed in 2000; however, plans stalled due to a lack of funds. The park has water features, sculptures, a playground and an area to play ball games. It also has a cycle path through the centre of it.

The site has contributed to local regeneration, with new developments nearby such as Merchant's Square and the Gas Place development.

=== Charing Cross ===
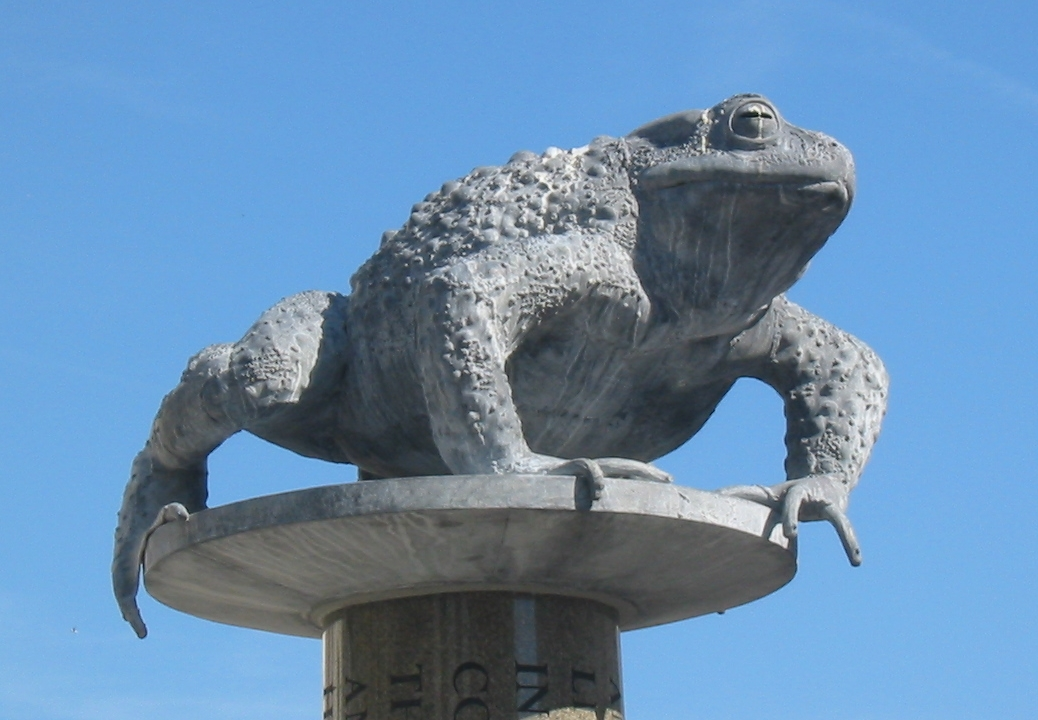
Le Crapaud of Charing Cross

Formerly the site of the prison in the 17th century, Charing Cross is a square at the western end of King Street. There is a monument of a Toad ("Le Crapaud"). It was erected in 2004 as part of the commemoration of 800 years of allegiance to the English Crown. On the side, there are inscribed extracts from the Code Le Geyt. Across the road, there is La Croix de la Reine, a cross erected to commemorate the Queen's Silver Jubilee in 1977. Recently, the Co-operative building on the square was redeveloped, with a new food store and the island's first Premier Inn.

=== St Andrew's Park ===
St Andrew's Park is located around St Andrew's Church in First Tower. It was donated by the Seigneur of Mélèches in 1911. Two neolithic dolmens can be found at St Andrew's Park near the main road which date to 2800 and 2300 BCE.

== Landmarks ==
Many places in St Helier have been formally listed as Sites of Special Interest by the Planning and Environment department of Jersey.

=== Elizabeth Castle ===
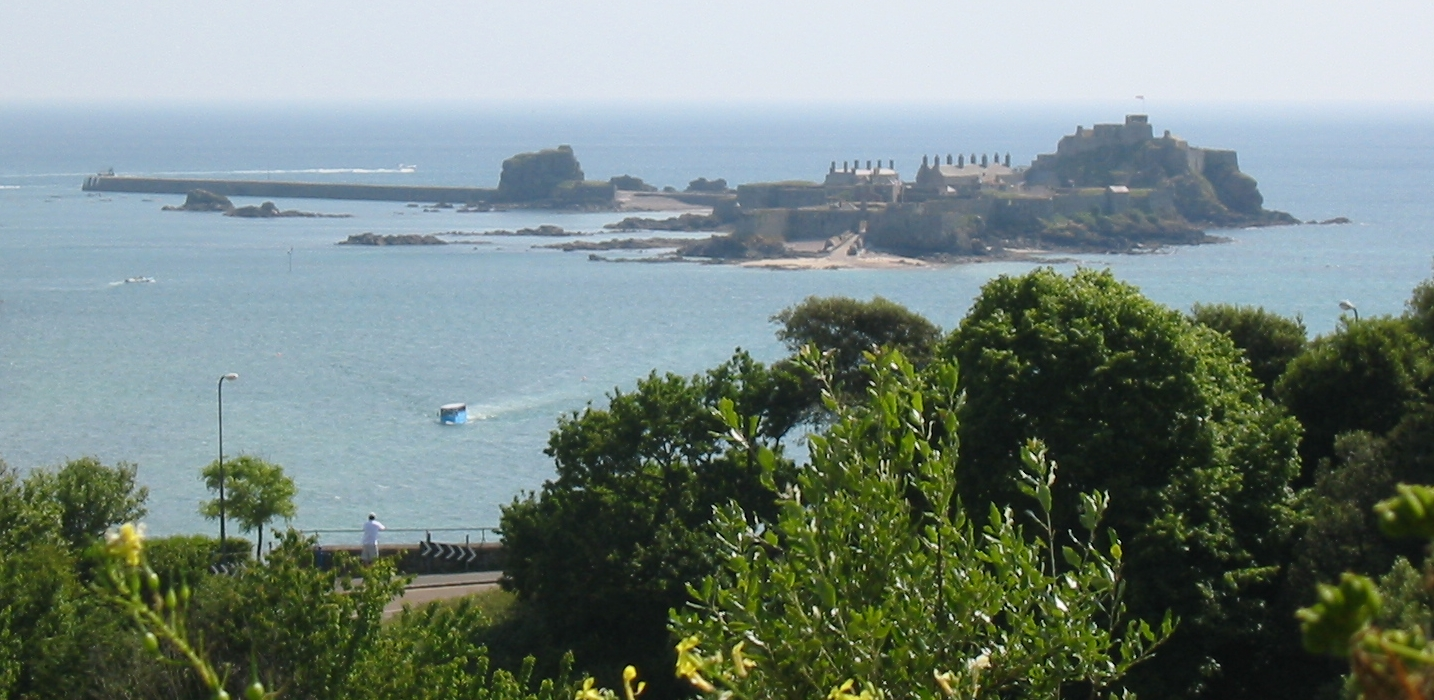
The castle viewed from the town, with the duck ferry running in its amphibious form

Elizabeth Castle is a 16th-century castle located on a tidal island off the coast of the town. It was constructed to supplement the defence provided by Mont Orgeuil in St Martin. It is now a museum and tourist attraction, administered by Jersey Heritage. It can be accessed by a causeway at low tide, which becomes inundated at high tide, and a duck ferry, which runs on land at low tide and by sea at high tide.

=== Fort Regent ===
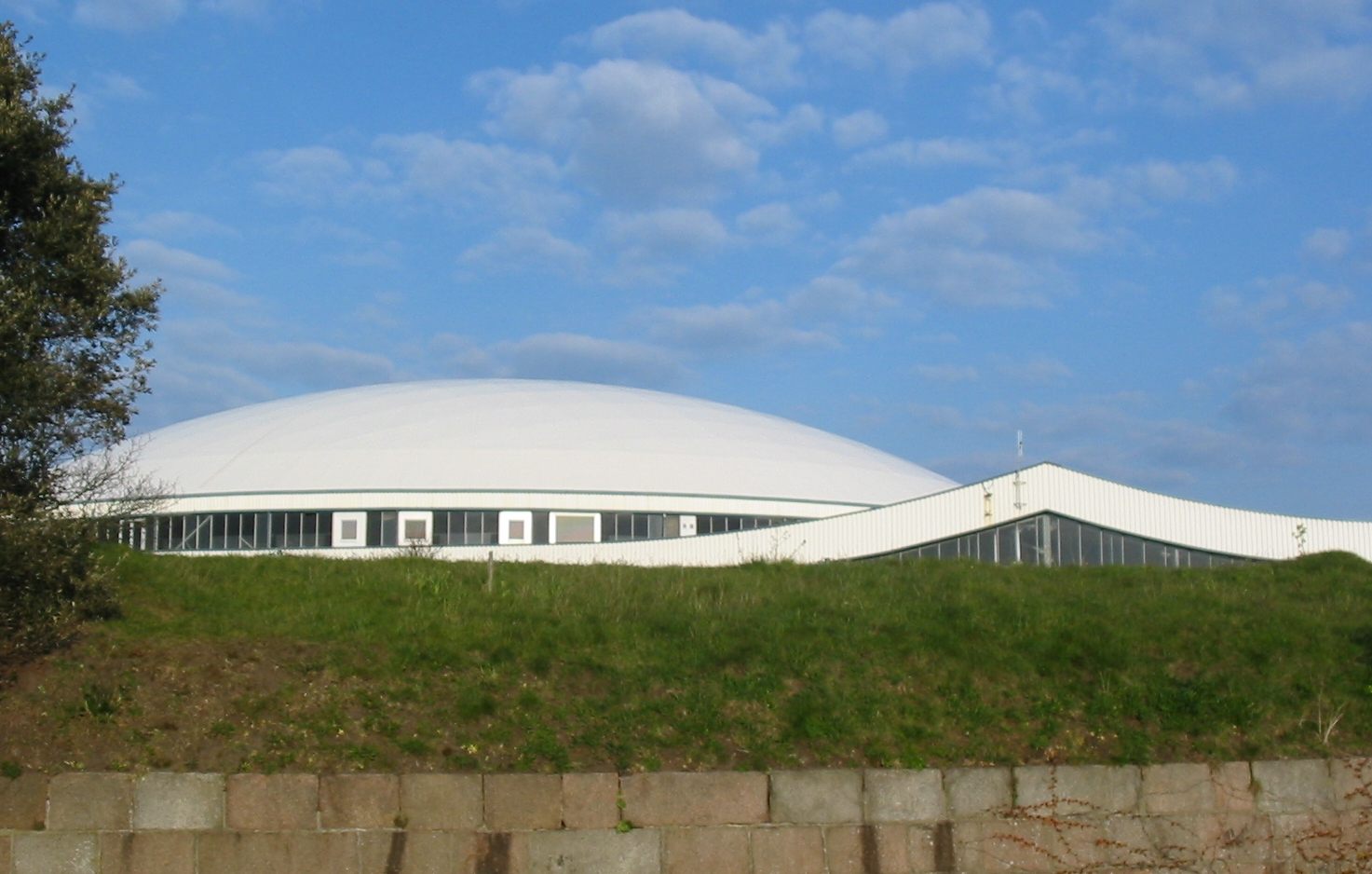
Fort Regent

Fort Regent is located at the top of the Mont de la Ville. It was initially constructed as a barracks at the end of the Napoleonic Wars. It was decided to develop it into a leisure complex in 1967. There was a cable car that gave access to Fort Regent from Snow Hill. However, it was closed in 1991. There also used to be a swimming pool that opened in 1971, but it was knocked down in 2020.

A tunnel (A17) was opened under the Fort on 25 February 1970 after seven years of construction. The tunnel links traffic from the east to the west of the island, and allowed for the pedestrianisation of the town centre.

=== Central Market and Beresford Market ===
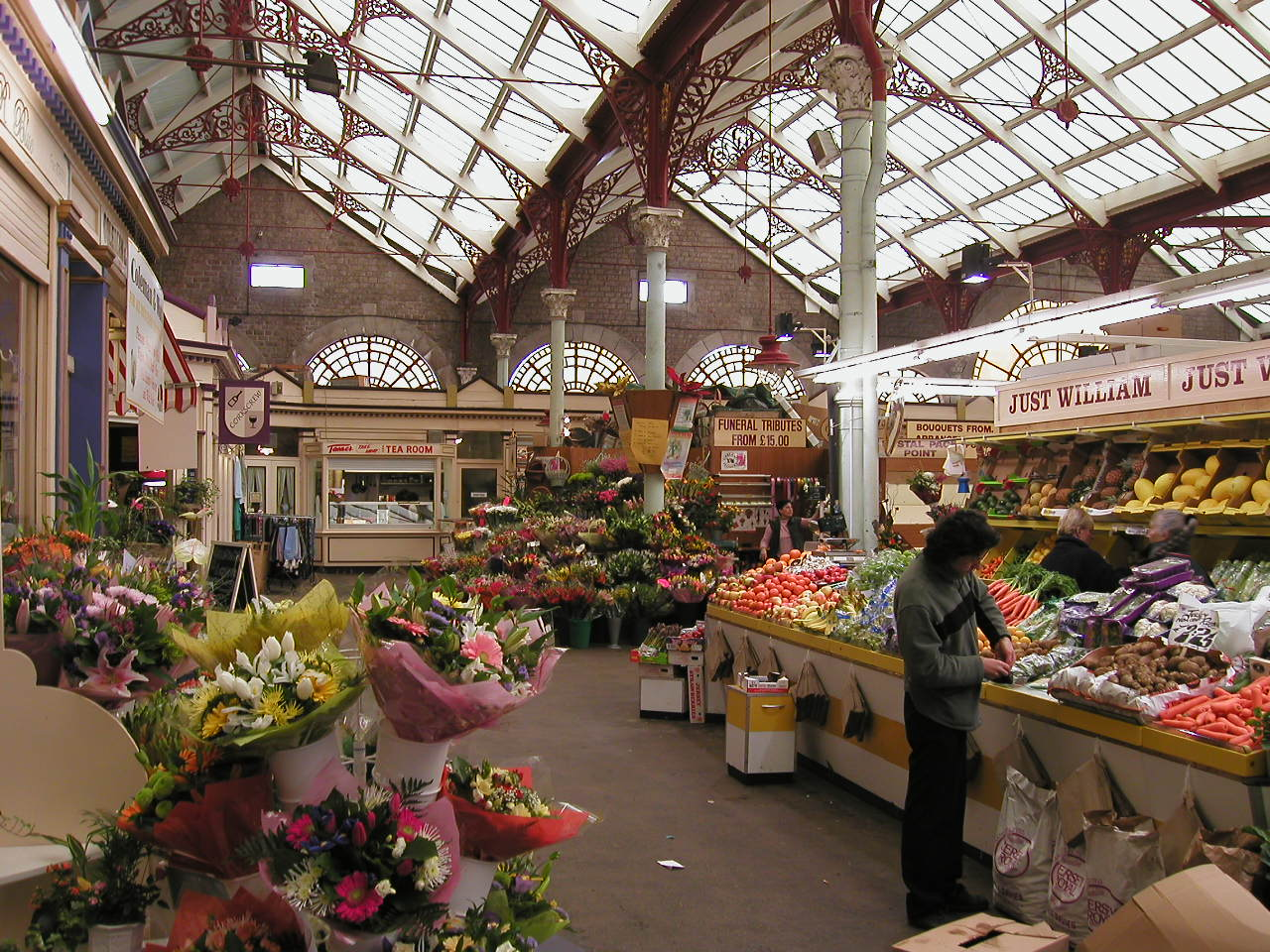
Central Market

Central Market, in Beresford Street, St Helier, is an indoor market that was opened in 1882. It is an official Site of Special Interest, and is popular with tourists and locals. It features Victorian architecture including cast iron structures, and an ornamental fountain in the centre. The market was designed by Thomas Helliwell of Brighouse, Yorkshire, working with Bellamy and Hardy of Lincoln. The market comprises stalls selling flowers, fruit and vegetables, as well as small shops and cafés.

Beresford Market is a separate building next to the Central Market and specialises in fishmongery.

=== 16 New Street ===
This is an 18th-century Georgian townhouse, with some 19th century additions, which has been renovated by the National Trust for Jersey, and is now operated as a museum.

== Transport ==
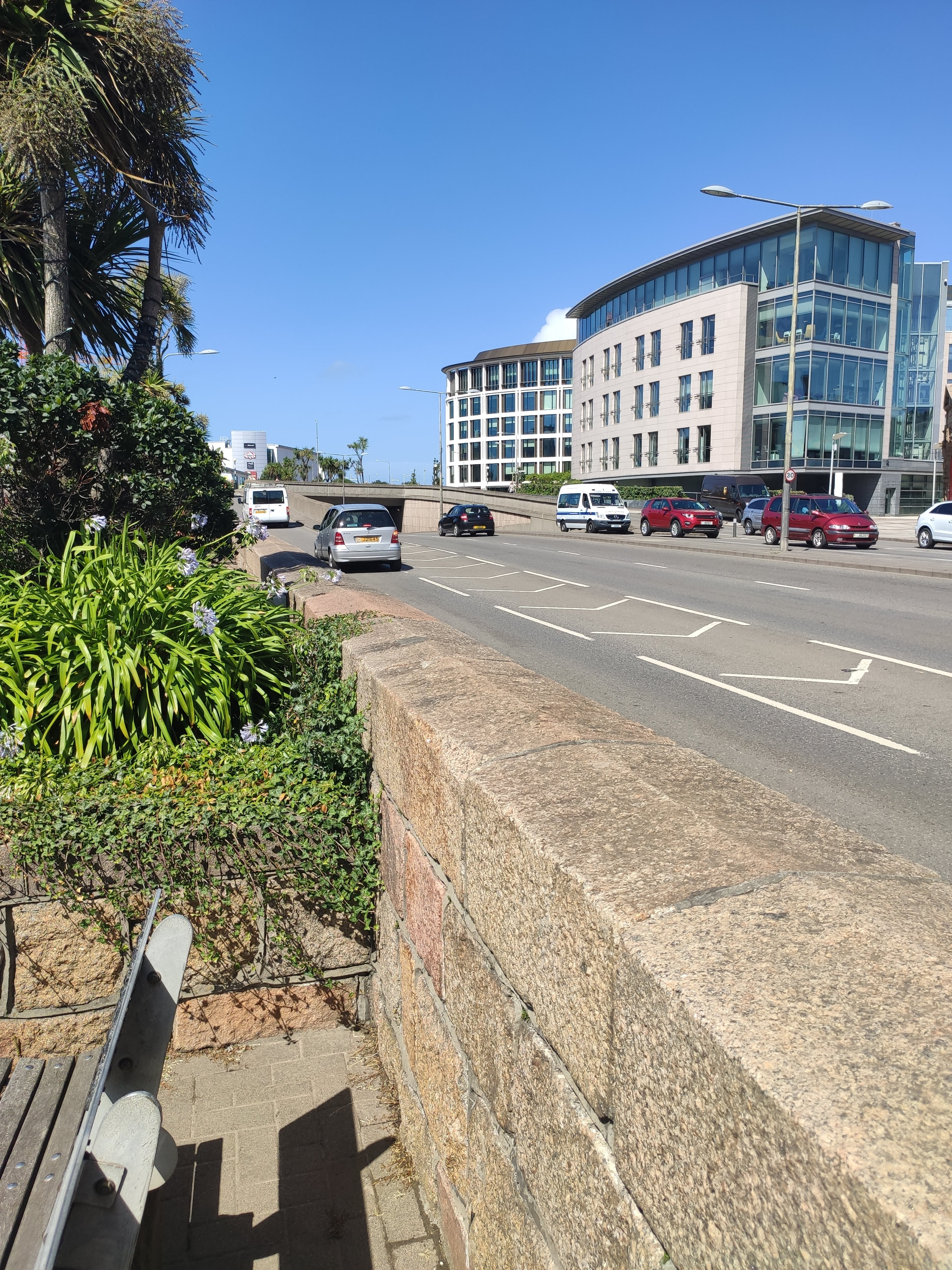
The Underpass, near Liberation Square in the south of St Helier. In the background is the new International Finance Centre. Le Grand Douet runs underneath this road.

The primary road network in the parish consists of the St Helier Ring Road (part of which is located in St Saviour) and a series of A roads branching from there to the surrounding parishes, such as Victoria Avenue. Under Fort Regent, a road tunnel connects the West and the East of the island together.

The parish is responsible for the upkeep of by-roads (chemins vicinaux) within its boundaries, managed by the Roads Committee. The Government is responsible for main roads.

The parish contains Liberation Station, the bus terminus for the island's public transport network. Every bus route on the island terminates in St Helier and the parish has bus connections to every settlement on the island. A number of bus services provide a direct connection to Jersey Airport in St Peter. In 2022, the TownLink service was introduced which provides a local service within St Helier.

The parish contains the island's main port, with ferry services to Saint-Malo, Poole and Portsmouth.

== Religious sites ==
The parish church is known as the Town Church and is the oldest building in St Helier, located on Church Street, across from the Royal Court. It predates the Battle of Hastings and has been altered and enlarged a number of times since. After the Reformation, the church became a Huguenot temple and eight successive Rectors were French Huguenot ministers. In 1842, due to the rising population of St Helier, the Dean of Jersey raised money to replace the church with a larger building; however, it was never built. The Rector of the Town Church is normally co-officially the Dean of Jersey. Charles II attended service in the Town Church a number of times before and during his reign.

As the town expanded in the 19th century, more Anglican churches were needed, especially for English services. The Church of St Mark on David Place, was opened in 1844, with a large two-storey congregation. The church was constructed on a shareholder system, whereby parishioners could purchase pews. The church's bells are the most southerly in the British Isles. St Andrew's Church at First Tower was originally opened in 1850 as a seamen's mission on Castle Street. It then moved to the Esplanade in a dedicated building in 1854. As the town spread west, the church's curate moved his church to a new park on a site donated by the Seigneur of Mélèches and opened in 1930.

The St Helier Methodist Centre on Halkett Place was originally part of the French Methodist circuit. The centre was built in 1847 for a congregation of 1,450. There were several other Methodist churches. In 1956, the French and English Methodist Churches combined into a single circuit; the congregations of Wesley Street and Grove Place combined into the Wesley Grove Methodist Church. In 2000, all the Methodist congregations in St Helier moved to the Halkett Place Chapel. St Thomas', commonly known as the French Church, is the largest Catholic congregation in the island. Its 1887 building is the finest example of French Gothic architecture in Jersey. There is also a Polish shrine and a Portuguese chapel, to serve the island's Catholic immigrant populations, the latter dedicated to Our Lady of Fatima.

== Future plans ==
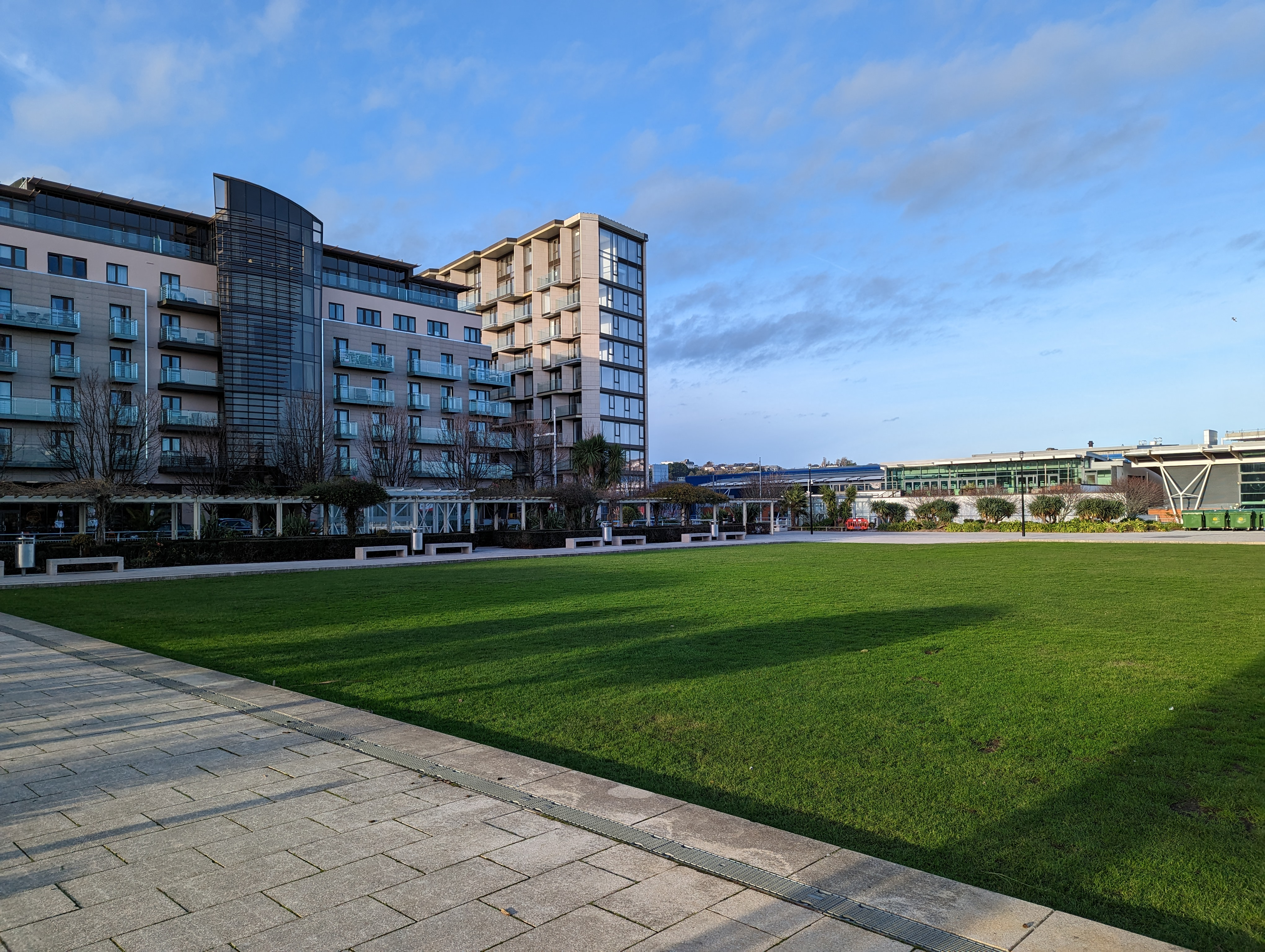
Waterfront Gardens (Jardîns du Quartchi du Hâvre) in 2022

The Waterfront (Quartchi du Hâvre) district of St Helier sits on land reclaimed during the 1980s. Since then, there have been numerous plans aimed at developing the area. The current planning framework covering the area is the Southwest St Helier Planning Framework, published in 2019. The plan aims to improve safety and convenience for pedestrians across La Route de la Libération (which is a road that runs through the area and is grade separated and at some points six lanes wide), including the possibility of an 'iconic bridge'; require major development proposals to have detailed landscaping schemes to enhance open space and secure a mix of uses in the area, including community facilities.

The state-owned Jersey Development Company, which owns much of the land in the area, is managing the redevelopment and has contracted Gillespies, a landscape architecture firm, after a concept design competition. As of June 2021, the proposals include demolishing the existing Waterfront Centre buildings, redesigning the existing Jardins de la Mer and Waterfront Gardens parks, creating new public squares and new single-phase signalised crossings across Route de la Libération.

== Twin towns and sister cities ==
St Helier is twinned with:

- Funchal, Madeira, Portugal
- Avranches, France
- Bad Wurzach, Germany
- Trenton, New Jersey, United States
- Mykolaiv, Ukraine

== Sport ==
The parish has a number of sports facilities, including Springfield Stadium Home of Jersey Bulls FC(incorporating the island's football pitch), Aquasplash (swimming pool), pétanque pitches, badminton and the Fort Regent leisure centre. Motorsports events take place on roads in the Parish as well as an annual Town Criterium, and the start and finish of the Jersey Marathon.

In 2021, the Government of Jersey published a report Inspiring Active Places Strategy. The strategy will have a total cost of circa £100 million. The plan proposes the removal of sports facilities from Fort Regent by early 2022, which is "beyond the end of its useful life". The report states it is not the best location for health and fitness facilities for St Helier residents. Therefore, by the end of 2021, there will be the need to create temporary or alternative facilities to enable sport relocation from Fort Regent.

Springfield will be refurbished to provide better public active facilities and a new town community park, with the single stadium pitch replaced with two smaller 5-a-side pitches by 2026/27. However, in the interim, parts of Springfield will be redeveloped to provide more parking.

The plan includes the reprovision of facilities from Fort Regent. By 2030, a new leisure centre will be constructed in the town centre, on the site of the Waterfront centre. The leases on the current Waterfront development terminate in 2027. It will include a large swimming pool, with minimal spectator provision, and 1,250 m^{2} (13,500 ft^{2}) of health and fitness space. This will re-accommodate the Aquasplash facility, which will be demolished, and the current fitness facilities at the Fort. Due to the high-density town centre location, there is the opportunity to construct a three-story residential site above the facility.

== Notable people ==
- Sir George Carteret (b. 1610), royal statesman, slave trader and first lord proprietor of the British colony of New Jersey, born in St Helier
- Henry Cavill (b. 1983), actor, known for playing Superman in the DC Extended Universe, and Geralt of Rivia in The Witcher
- Gerald Malcolm Durrell (1925–1995), naturalist, writer, zookeeper, conservationist
- John St Helier Lander, artist
- Graeme Le Saux, former Chelsea FC and English football player
- Henry Poingdestre (1832?–1885) was a New Zealand runholder, rabbit farmer and eccentric, born in St. Helier
- Vaughn Toulouse (born Vaughn Cotillard; 30 July 1959 – 8 August 1991), British singer; founding member of Guns for Hire and its successor band Department S, both of which emerged from the late 70s British punk rock scene; born in St. Helier on the island of Jersey and raised in St Austell, Cornwall

== See also ==
- Beaulieu Convent School
- Victoria College, Jersey
- Maritime history of the Channel Islands

== General bibliography ==
- Balleine's History of Jersey, Marguerite Syvret and Joan Stevens (1998) ISBN 1-86077-065-7.
- Jersey in Figures, 2003–2004, published by the States of Jersey.
