= Henry Poingdestre =

New Zealand runholder, rabbit farmer and eccentric

Henry Poingdestre (1832?–1885) was a New Zealand runholder, rabbit farmer and eccentric. He was born in St Helier, Channel Islands in about 1832.
