= TownLink =

Bus route on the island of Jersey

TownLink is a circular bus route that operates in St Helier on Jersey. It is operated by LibertyBus.

== History ==
In the late 1990s, a circular route branded "Hoppa" operated within St Helier, but it was short lived. The introduction of a bus service was approved in 2011, but did not launch in 2013 as intended.

In January 2021, it was announced that a new route would be trialed in the summer. In August 2021, a £365,000 contract was agreed with LibertyBus and it was stated that the route would start by the end of 2021. The route started on 30 May 2022.

== Service ==
The bus service operates from Monday to Saturday between 9 am and 6 pm. The entire loop takes around 30 minutes.
