= Accounts Committee =

The Accounts Committee of each Parish in Jersey is responsible for ensuring that appropriate accounting methodologies are employed in the preparation of the annual Constable's accounts in order that the Parish Assembly can rely on the information provided in order to set the Parish Rate.
