= Vingtaine du Nord =

There are two Vingtaines du Nord in Jersey

- Vingtaine du Nord (St John) in the parish of St John
- Vingtaine du Nord (St Mary) in the parish of St Mary
