= Parishes of Jersey =

First-level administrative divisions of the Bailiwick of Jersey

Parish
- Parishes of Jersey
- Category: Parish
- Location: Jersey
- Number: 12 (as of 2020)
- Subdivisions: Vingtaines or Cuillettes

The parishes of Jersey (Jèrriais: Les pâraisses dé Jèrri) are the twelve civil parishes of Jersey in the Channel Islands. They are also historic ecclesiastical parishes, each sharing its name with an ancient parish church. All twelve parishes have a coastline.

The parishes are ancient institutions, with origins in Jersey's ecclesiastical history and in the Norman customary law from which much of Jersey law developed. Each parish is headed by an elected connétable, who also sits in the States Assembly, and is supported by other elected parish officers and the parish assembly.

In modern Jersey, the parishes retain a limited range of local administrative functions. These include refuse collection, parish roads and aspects of local policing through the Honorary Police. Many public services are instead provided on an island-wide basis by the Government of Jersey or other public bodies.

== History ==
=== Names ===
Eleven of the twelve parishes are named for the saint of their parish church. The remaining parish's church does not have a saint, but the parish is still named for its church. Such uniform naming would be fairly unusual for parishes in England.

In Jèrriais, the parishes have named groupings: the northern parishes are called les pâraisses d'amout (uphill parishes) and the southern and western parishes are called les pâraisses d'ava (sloped parishes).

=== Origins ===
The origins of the Jersey parishes is unknown, however it is certain that they are ancient institutions. It has been suggested that the five central parishes (St Saviour, St John, St Mary, St Peter and St Lawrence) date to around 475 AD.

The parish system is much more important in Jersey than in England or post-Napoleon France.^{:15} The uniformity of the parishes in size ensured their dominance over the feudal boundaries. The uniformity may in fact be designed out of a reorganisation of the Diocese of Coutances in the twelfth century by Archbishop Geoffrey de Montbrai, following Viking raids of the islands. The new boundaries paid little heed to the fiefs or to geographical factors (hence why Gorey and St. Aubin are not parish centres, despite being populated). By Norman times, the parish boundaries were firmly fixed and remain largely unchanged since. It was likely set in place due to the tithe system under Charlemagne, where each property must contribute to the church, so each property would have had to be established within a parish.

Although in France the role of the parishes remained strictly ecclesiastical, in Jersey the parishes adopted a role in secular administration as well. For example, there is the ancient practice of l'ouie de paroisse – the recording of contracts, court decisions and legislation by the parishes. In 1545, the States set up a system of districts based on parish boundaries for defensive purposes. This started the relationship between the parish and the military. Archery ranges, parade grounds and arsenals known as Les Buttes were set up in various parish centres.

In the thirteenth century, parishioners had become split into two categories: the principaux and the parvuli. The principaux were the wealthier parishioners and were eligible to rule the parishes. The criteria to be considered a principal differed by parish and was determined by the amount of rate paid on property.

According to the Rolls of the Norman Exchequer, in 1180 Jersey was divided for administrative purposes into three ministeria: de Gorroic, de Groceio and de Crapoudoit (possibly containing four parishes each). Gorroic is an old spelling for Gorey, containing St Martin, St Saviour, Grouville and St Clement; Groceio could derive from de Gruchy, and contains St John, Trinity, St Lawrence and St Helier; and Crapoudoit, likely referring to the stream of St Peter's Valley, contains the remainder of the parishes in the West. This was a time of building or extending churches with most parish churches in the island being built/rebuilt in a Norman style chosen by the abbey or priory to which each church had been granted. St Mary and St Martin being given to Cerisy Abbey.

In 1496, Henry VII bribed the Pope to allow Jersey to be moved from the diocese of Coutances to Westminster. The Reformation arrived in Jersey from France, making Calvinism rather than Anglicanism as the major form of Protestantism in Jersey. Due to Jersey's self-governance and the distinctive parish structure in Jersey, the Crown allowed Calvinism to establish itself in Jersey until 1620. This form of Christianity privileged the position of the parish generally, which maintained and boosted the role of the parish within the country's cultural mindset and political structure.

== Geography ==
The parishes vary widely in population, density and character. St Helier is by far the largest and most urbanised parish, while neighbouring St Saviour and St Clement have more suburban profiles; smaller parishes such as St Mary, St John, Trinity and St Martin are more rural. The boundaries of the parishes rarely share the same boundaries as the ancient fiefs of Jersey. The parishes do not all have nucleated settlements around villages.

=== List of parishes ===
Parish (in Jèrriais)	Population (2021)	Area in km^{2}(mi^{2})	Density (people/km^{2})
St Helier (St Hélyi)	35,822	10.6 (4.1) (5th)	3,541
Grouville (Grouville)	5,401	7.8 (3.0) (10th)	682
St Brelade (St Brélade)	11,012	12.8 (4.9) (2nd)	901
St Clement (St Cliément)	9,925	4.2 (1.6) (12th)	2,395
St John (St Jean)	3,051	8.7 (3.4) (9th)	359
St Lawrence (St Louothains)	5,561	9.5 (3.7) (7th)	615
St Martin (St Martîn)	3,948	10.3 (4.0) (6th)	404
St Mary (Sainte Mathie)	1,818	6.5 (2.5) (11th)	306
St Ouen (St Ouën)	4,206	15 (6.0) (1st)	297
St Peter (St Pièrre)	5,264	11.6 (4.5) (4th)	469
St Saviour (St Saûveux)	13,904	9.3 (3.6) (8th)	1,593
Trinity (La Trinneté)	3,355	12.3 (4.7) (3rd)	279

=== Subdivisions ===
Each parish is divided into vingtaines, except for St Ouen, which is divided into cueillettes. These subdivisions are of ancient origin and continue to have administrative significance, particularly in relation to parish roads and honorary parish offices. Roads Inspectors are appointed for each vingtaine, and Vingteniers, although elected by the whole Parish Assembly, retain functions connected with honorary policing and the maintenance of roads within the vingtaines or cueillettes.

=== States Assembly constituencies ===
Each parish, regardless of population, elects one connétable, who is a member of the States Assembly by virtue of that office.

Elections for the 28 deputies are organised separately, through constituencies intended to give greater weight to voter equality. The present constituency structure reflects reforms approved in 2020 and first used at the 2022 general election, when the previous system of parish-based deputy districts was replaced by larger multi-member constituencies.

As a result, some parishes retain a parish-wide deputy constituency: St Brelade (three deputies), St Clement (three deputies) and St Saviour (four deputies) each elect representatives within their own parish boundaries. St Helier, because of its larger population, is divided into three deputy constituencies: St Helier Central, St Helier North and St Helier South (in total 10 deputies). Smaller parishes are grouped together: Grouville and St Martin (two deputies); St John, St Lawrence and Trinity (three deputies); and St Mary, St Ouen and St Peter (three deputies).

The reforms were defended as a way of improving equality of representation between voters, but they also changed the relationship between parish identity and representation in the States Assembly. In particular, some smaller parishes no longer elect a deputy solely for that parish, although each continues to elect its own connétable.

== Parish halls ==
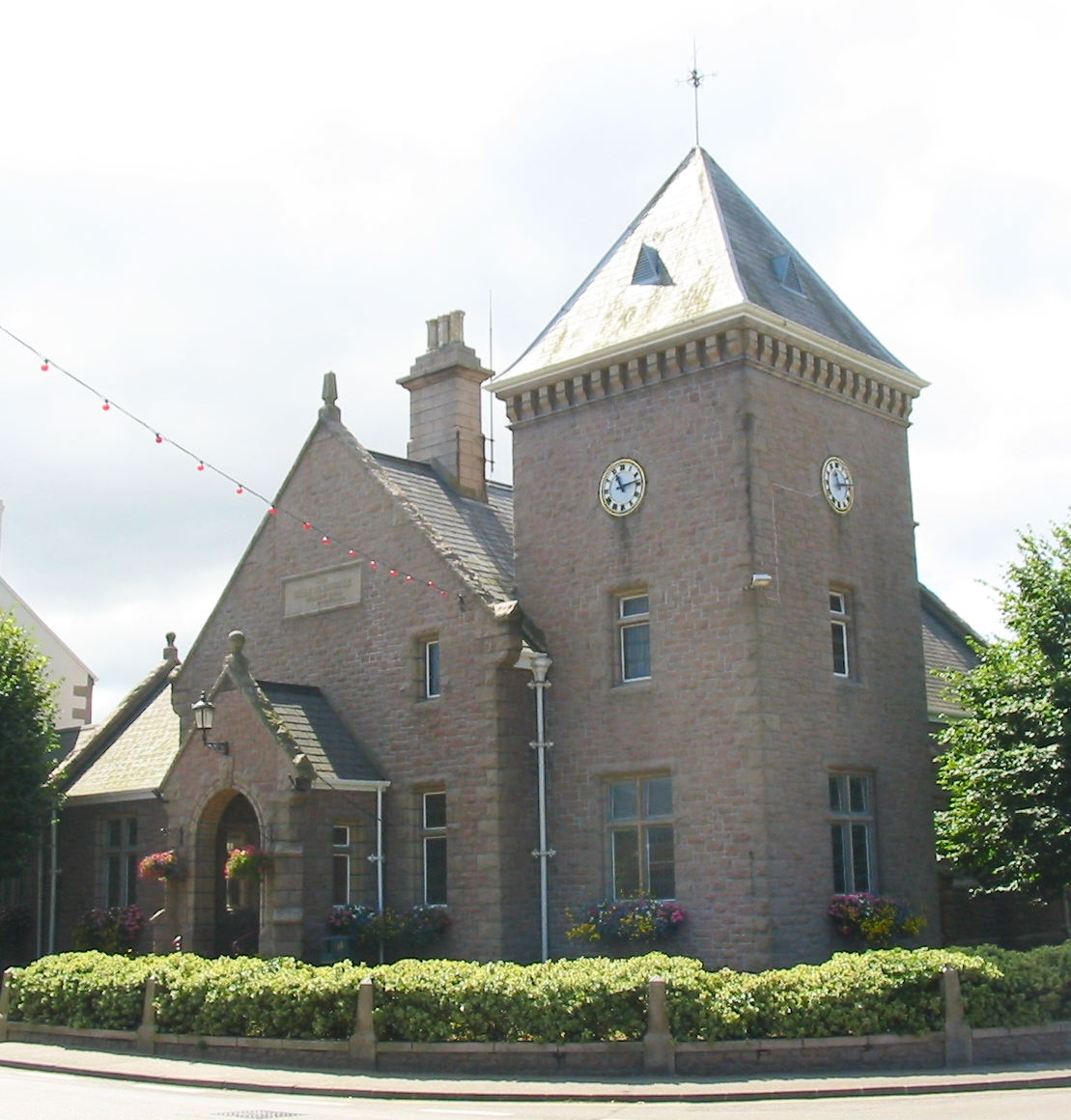
St John Parish Hall

Each parish has public premises used for parish administration and civic functions. These are generally known as parish halls (salle paroissiale in French), although St Helier uses the term Town Hall and St Martin uses the term Public Hall. Parish halls provide the administrative centre for parish government and community engagement, including meetings of the Parish Assembly, public reception services and office accommodation for parish officials including the honorary police, and staff.

The parish hall is also associated with several distinctive Jersey institutions. The Parish Assembly takes place in the parish hall. Parish hall enquiries, in which a centenier considers whether an alleged offence should be prosecuted or dealt with in another way, are also held in parish halls. Parish halls are used for election purposes, including as polling stations or for election counts, depending on the parish and election arrangements.

Parish halls also have social and community uses beyond formal parish administration. A States Assembly 2026 scrutiny review noted that parishes provide facilities and community spaces used for children’s play, seasonal events, early-years activities, playgroups and toddler sessions. Some parishes also have additional community premises or associated facilities, for example Trinity has an adjacent Youth and Community Centre, used for a youth club, senior citizens’ club, bowls, Scouts and other associations and St John’s Recreation Centre hosts youth, sports and recreation activities.

Purpose-built parish premises are a relatively modern development compared with the ancient parish system. St Helier Town Hall was built in 1872 and replaced earlier arrangements under which parish meetings had been held in venues including the Royal Yacht Hotel and, earlier still, the Town Church. St Martin's Public Hall originated from an 1887 donation connected with the parish church Sunday School; the parish continues to distinguish it from the parish halls of other parishes.

== Local government functions ==
Each parish administers a limited range of local affairs. These include parish rates, expenditure, contracts, parish property, parish roads, household waste collection, certain licensing and regulatory functions, parish halls and community facilities, and local policing through the Honorary Police. Parish rates are levied on owners and occupiers of land in the parish, based on assessed rateable values. The parishes are civil parishes and corporate bodies separate from their parishioners, and each parish owns the public by-roads within its boundaries.

=== Current functions ===
These functions do not all belong to the same legal actor. Some are exercised by the parish as a corporate body, some by the Connétable, some by the Parish Assembly, some by the Roads Committee or Roads Inspectors, and some by honorary police officers. Many wider public services are provided on an island-wide basis by the Government of Jersey or other public bodies.

Principal local functions of the parishes
Function	Parish role
Parish roads	Each parish owns and administers public by-roads (chemins vicinaux) within its boundaries. Parish road matters include road sweeping, maintenance, road names, boundary stones, branchage and some local road improvements.
Refuse collection	Household rubbish is collected by the parish; glass is kept separate, bring-bank recycling is available in all parishes, and kerbside recycling is offered by some parishes.
Honorary policing	Each parish has an Honorary Police force made up of elected officers. Operational leadership sits with the Chef de Police, while the connétable retains supervisory responsibility.
Parish hall enquiries	Parish halls are used for parish hall enquiries, in which a centenier considers whether an alleged offence should be prosecuted or dealt with in another way.
Dog licensing	Dog licence applications are made to the Connétable of the parish where the owner resides; the Connétable issues licences, subject to statutory refusal grounds, and keeps the dog licence register.
Driving licences	Driving licence applications are made through the parish system; Jersey law treats the relevant parochial authority as the Connétable of the parish where the applicant or licence holder resides.
Firearm certificates	Applications for firearm certificates are made to the Connétable. The Connétable of the parish where the applicant or certificate holder resides is responsible for grant, renewal, variation and revocation. This includes certificates relating to shot guns.
Alcohol licensing recommendations	Parish Assemblies consider liquor licence applications and make recommendations; the Connétable of the parish concerned attends the Licensing Assembly and may be heard.
Elections and civic functions	Parish halls and parish institutions are used for electoral and civic purposes, including polling or counts depending on the election arrangements.
Parish halls and community facilities	Parish halls provide administrative centres, public reception services, meeting space and community facilities. Some parishes also provide additional community premises.

=== Historic functions ===
The modern functions of the parishes are narrower than their historic role. Parishes historically had responsibilities for poor relief: the Poor Law Amendment (Jersey) Law 1953 still referred to the duty of a parish to assist persons in need, but parish welfare obligations were abolished when the Income Support system, administered by the Government of Jersey, was introduced in 2008.

The parishes acquired a direct role in elementary education at the end of the nineteenth century. An Act of the States adopted in 1894 made elementary education compulsory for children aged five to twelve, although it did not require the provision of additional school accommodation. The Loi sur les Écoles Élémentaires et l’Instruction Obligatoire 1899 subsequently required each parish to provide a parochial school and establish an elected Conseil paroissial, prompting the construction of nine purpose-built parish schools. Education is now administered on an island-wide basis: the Education (Jersey) Law 1999 gives the States and the Minister responsibilities for education and school-place planning, while providing that the States continue to have possession of and responsibility for maintaining Jersey's parish schools.

== Structure of parish government ==
=== Connétable ===
The head of the civil parish is the connétable (English: constable), an office rooted in Jersey custom and recorded from at least 1462. Each parish elects one connétable for a four-year term at the general election.

==== Connétables in their parishes ====
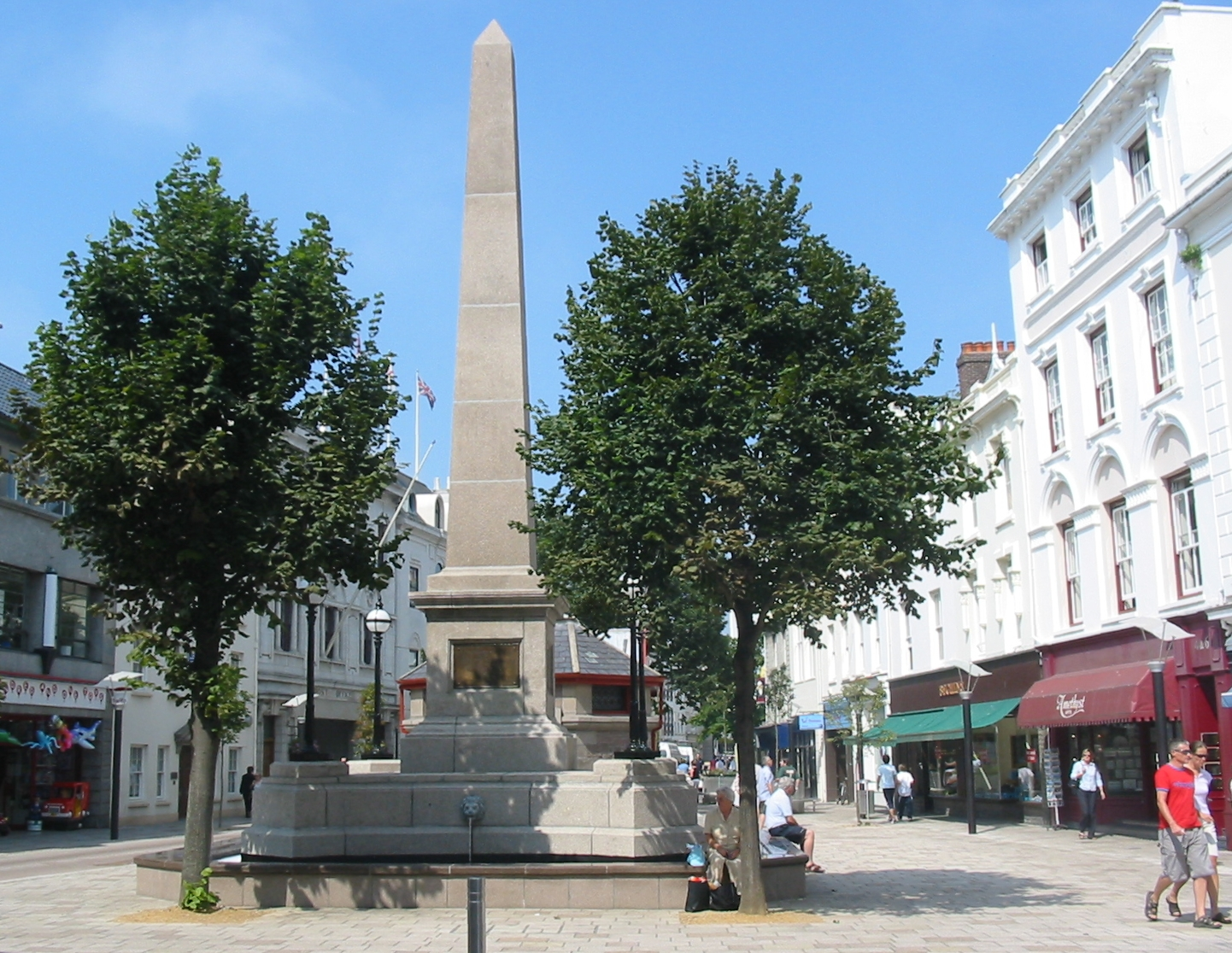
Erected in 1855, a granite obelisk in Broad Street is a memorial to Pierre Le Sueur (1811-1859), who was elected Constable of St Helier five times. He modernised St Helier's infrastructure, installing the town's first sewers and improving the water supply following cholera outbreaks in the 1830s.

Connétables have a range of responsibilities related to parish adminsitration. They preside over the civil Parish Assembly, convene and chair the Roads Committee. Each connétable is the representative of the parish rather than its delegate, and the person is expected to be available to parishioners on matters of collective or individual concern.

The connétable is no longer the operational head of the parish Honorary Police. The Connétables (Miscellaneous Provisions) (Jersey) Law 2012 removed the customary-law policing functions of connétables, including powers connected with arrest, charging, bail and Parish Hall Enquiries, while preserving their supervisory responsibility for the Honorary Police of the parish. Operational leadership now sits with the Chef de Police, a centenier appointed by the connétable to lead and direct the parish's honorary officers. The reform reflected a long-standing policy that connétables should cease to exercise operational policing powers while retaining overall responsibility for effective parish policing.

==== Connétables in the States Assembly ====
Each connétable is also a member of the States Assembly by virtue of office. Connétables therefore divide their time between parish work and States Assembly work, including attending States meetings, speaking and voting in debates, and lodging propositions. Until 1974, if a connétable was unable to attend the States Assembly, the parish's senior centenier could attend in their place.

In 2000, Sir Cecil Clothier’s machinery of government review recommended that connétables should cease to be ex officio States members, though individual connétables should be free to stand as deputies. In a 2014 referendum, voters were asked whether connétables should remain members of the States as an automatic right; 15,069 voted in favour and 9,061 against.

Connétable elections have raised questions about electoral competition. Before 2022, candidates standing without opposition were elected unopposed. A Commonwealth Parliamentary Association election observation mission reported that the number of uncontested seats overall fell from 14 in 2018 to 8 in 2022, but that all 8 were connétable seats. From 2022, ballot papers include a "None of the Candidates" option where the number of candidates is equal to or fewer than the number of vacancies. If "None of the Candidates" receives the most votes, no candidate is elected and a new nomination process is triggered, though to date this has not occurred. Six of the 12 connétables were elected unopposed in the 2026 general election.

Connétables may also hold ministerial or assistant ministerial office. In 2026 the newly elected chair of the Comité des Connétables argued that connétables should remain in the States Assembly but should not hold ministerial office, on the basis that their primary responsibility was to their parishes.

==== Comité des Connétables ====
The twelve connétables also meet collectively as the Comité des Connétables. The 2026 States Assembly scrutiny review described the Comité as a coordinating forum for issues such as rates administration, honorary policing, licensing, digital services and legislation affecting the parishes, while noting that decision-making authority for local matters remains with individual parishes and their Parish Assemblies.

The Comité is not a statutory committee of the States Assembly, although the same twelve connétables also sit as the Supervisory Committee, which is a statutory committee under the Rates Law.

The Comité agrees its own rules and publishes approved minutes for business that is not exempt under the Freedom of Information (Jersey) Law 2011. Committee meetings generally take place in public.

The following table shows membership of the Comité after the June 2026 general election.

Parish	Connétable	Biographical note (source: States Assembly website)
St Helier	Inna Gardiner	First elected Connétable of St Helier in 2026, having previously been elected Deputy for St Helier No. 3 and 4 in 2019 and re-elected as Deputy for St Helier North in 2022.
Grouville	Mark Labey	First elected Connétable of Grouville in 2022 and re-elected in 2026.
St Brelade	Steve Pallett	Elected Connétable of St Brelade in 2026, having previously served as Connétable from 2011 and as a Senator from 2018.
St Clement	Marcus Troy	First elected Connétable of St Clement in 2021, elected again in 2022 and re-elected in 2026.
St John	Andy Jehan	First elected Connétable of St John in 2021. Previously served as Minister for Infrastructure in the Council of Ministers. Currently chair of the Comité.
St Lawrence	Tina Palmer	Elected Connétable of St Lawrence in 2026.
St Martin	Karen Shenton-Stone	First elected as Connétable in 2018. Served as chair of the Privileges and Procedure Committee in the States Assembly.
St Mary	David Johnson	Re-elected Connétable of St Mary in 2026, having previously been elected Deputy of St Mary in 2014.
St Ouen	Richard Honeycombe	Elected Connétable of St Ouen in 2022 and re-elected in 2026.
St Peter	Richard Vibert	Elected Connétable of St Peter in 2018 and re-elected in 2022 and 2026. Also services as Minster for Children and Families in the Council of Ministers.
St Saviour	Dave Curtis	Elected Connétable of St Saviour in 2026.
Trinity	Andy Howell	Elected Connétable of Trinity in 2026, having previously been elected Deputy for St John, St Lawrence and Trinity in 2022.

=== Procureurs du Bien Public and other officers ===
The parish also has two Procureurs du Bien Public (French: attorney of the public good) in each parish. As the legal and financial representatives of the parish, procureurs are elected for a term of three years. They maintain an oversight of Parish finances and –

- have a duty to represent the Parish in the care of Parish property;
- have a duty to report to the Principals and Officers of the Parish any matter concerning the public property of the Parish, or the application of the income of the Parish, about which the principals and officers should be made aware;
- must carry out duly considered instructions of the Parish Assembly or officers even if they disagree with their wisdom and
- may seek guidance of the Royal Court on the meaning or legality of any such instructions.

Other parish administrative bodies and office-holders include the Rates Assessment Committee, which may review the rateable value of any area of land shown on the parish’s Rates List before it is approved. The parish registrar and deputy registrars are appointed by the Connétable to carry out functions relating to the registration of births, stillbirths, deaths and marriages, and, where relevant registration duties are retained, civil partnerships.

=== Honorary police ===
Each parish also has its own Honorary Police force, made up of Centeniers, Vingteniers and Constable's Officers.

=== Parish assembly ===
The Jersey Law Commission has described the parish assembly as the "engine room" of parish life, while noting that it is not, strictly in law, a general debating forum. The parish assembly is the governmental body of each parish. It is traditionally known as the "Assembly of Principals and Officers" of the parish. For civil business the assembly is presided over by the Connétable; for ecclesiastical business it is presided over by the Rector. In this latter capacity it is usually described as the Ecclesiastical Assembly.

Members of a parish assembly include parish electors and ratepayers. A member has one vote, even if qualified to participate in more than one capacity. Deputies of the States Assembly whose constituency includes the parish may attend parish assemblies for that parish if they are not otherwise members, but may not vote.

The parish assembly performs a range of local government functions. These include:

- electing parish officers,
- approving parish rates and parish expenditure,
- placing funds at the disposal of the Roads Committee,
- considering road matters and local improvements,
- authorising certain contracts, and
- making recommendations on liquor licence applications.

The procedure for parish assemblies is governed by a mixture of customary law and legislation, including the Loi (1804) au sujet des assemblées paroissiales, the Loi (1842) sur les publications dans les Églises, the Loi (1905) au sujet des assemblées paroissiales and the Rates (Jersey) Law 2005. Notice of an assembly must be given in the Jersey Gazette and placed in the parish notice box, although parishes commonly also publicise meetings through websites and other channels. The convening notice must state the business to be discussed, and no other business may normally be considered except matters relating to public safety or the care of the poor.

The President of a parish assembly must convene an assembly within two weeks of receiving a written, dated request from ten or more members of the assembly, provided that the request states a lawful proposition within the competence of the assembly. In 2021, Westmount residents used a requête to secure a St Helier parish assembly vote on whether parish land should be acquired or used for road works connected with the proposed access route to the new hospital. Bailiwick Express reported that the assembly was called after residents sought to prevent any purchase of parish land until parishioners had received further details about the proposed highway works. A further example occurred in 2023, when 23 home and business owners in Trinity used a requête to require a parish assembly on proposed road-network changes, after raising concerns about traffic, noise and road safety.

=== Roads Committee ===
In each parish, the Roads Committee (French: comité des chemins) is responsible for parish roads (French: chemins vicinaux). In Jersey, parish roads are distinct from main roads administered on an island-wide basis by the Minister responsible for Infrastructure. Each parish is responsible for the upkeep of public by-roads within its boundaries, and the Roads Committee is the highway authority for those by-roads. The Connétable presides over the Roads Committee.

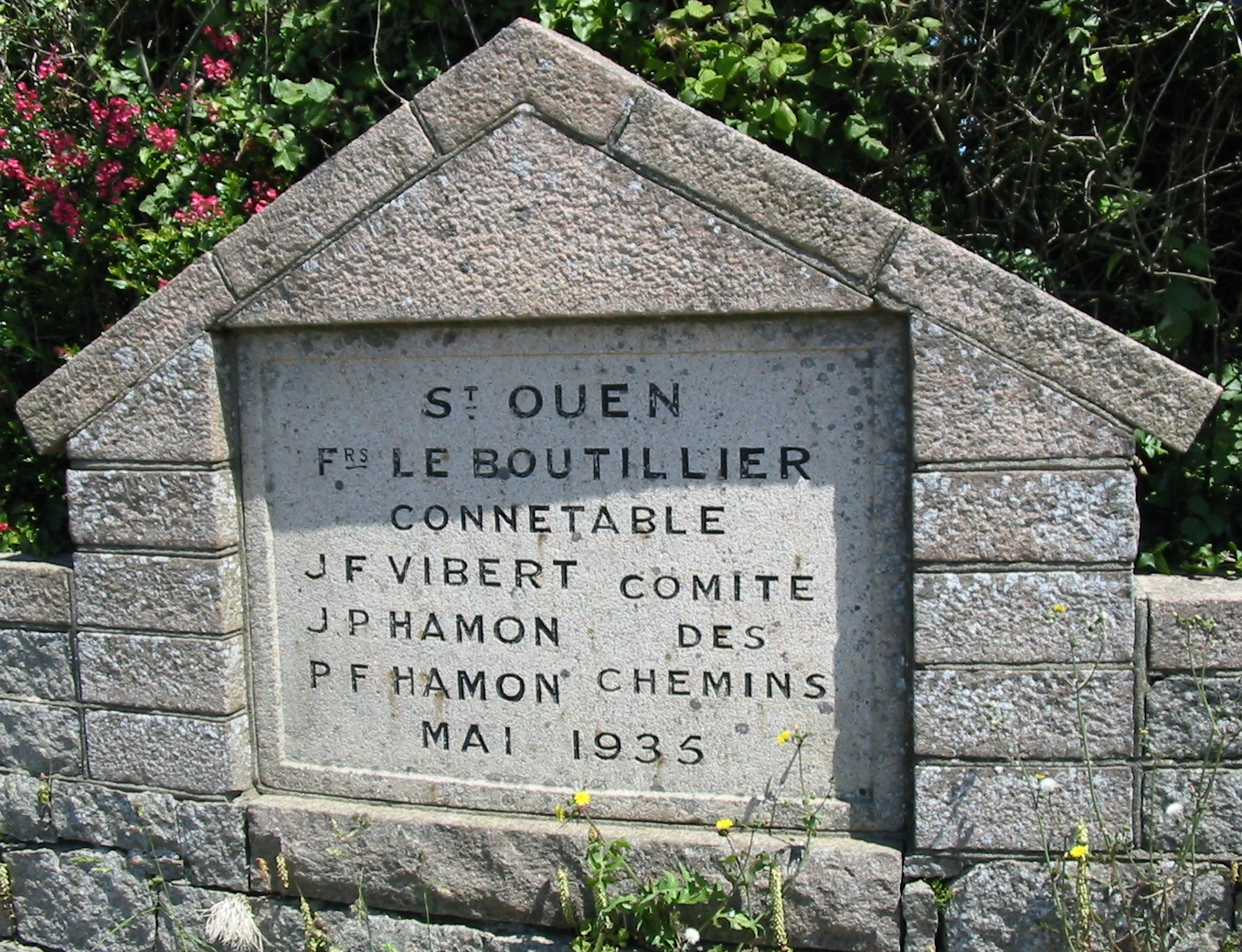
Road marker stone in St Ouen dated 1935 inscribed with the names of the roads committee

Under the Loi (1914) sur la Voirie, a Roads Committee is established in each parish to superintend the repair and maintenance of parish by-roads, direct the planning and execution of works, and ensure compliance with the Law. The committee also has functions connected with the visite du branchage, boundary stones and road inspections.

Roads Committees also comment on planning applications affecting parish roads or matters within their remit, issue licences relating to structures below, on or above by-roads, propose new road names for approval by the Parish Assembly and, in practice, have a role in parish refuse collection.

In St Helier, the committee is made up of five elected members (the 1914 Law calls them Principaux), together with the Connétable and the Dean of Jersey, and meetings are also attended by the Procureurs du Bien Public.

In each of the other parishes, it consists of the Connétable, the Rector and three elected residents of the parish. The elected principals are chosen by the Parish Assembly for a three-year term; the same December Parish Assembly also elects the Roads Inspectors, who take office on 1 January.

=== Roads inspectors ===
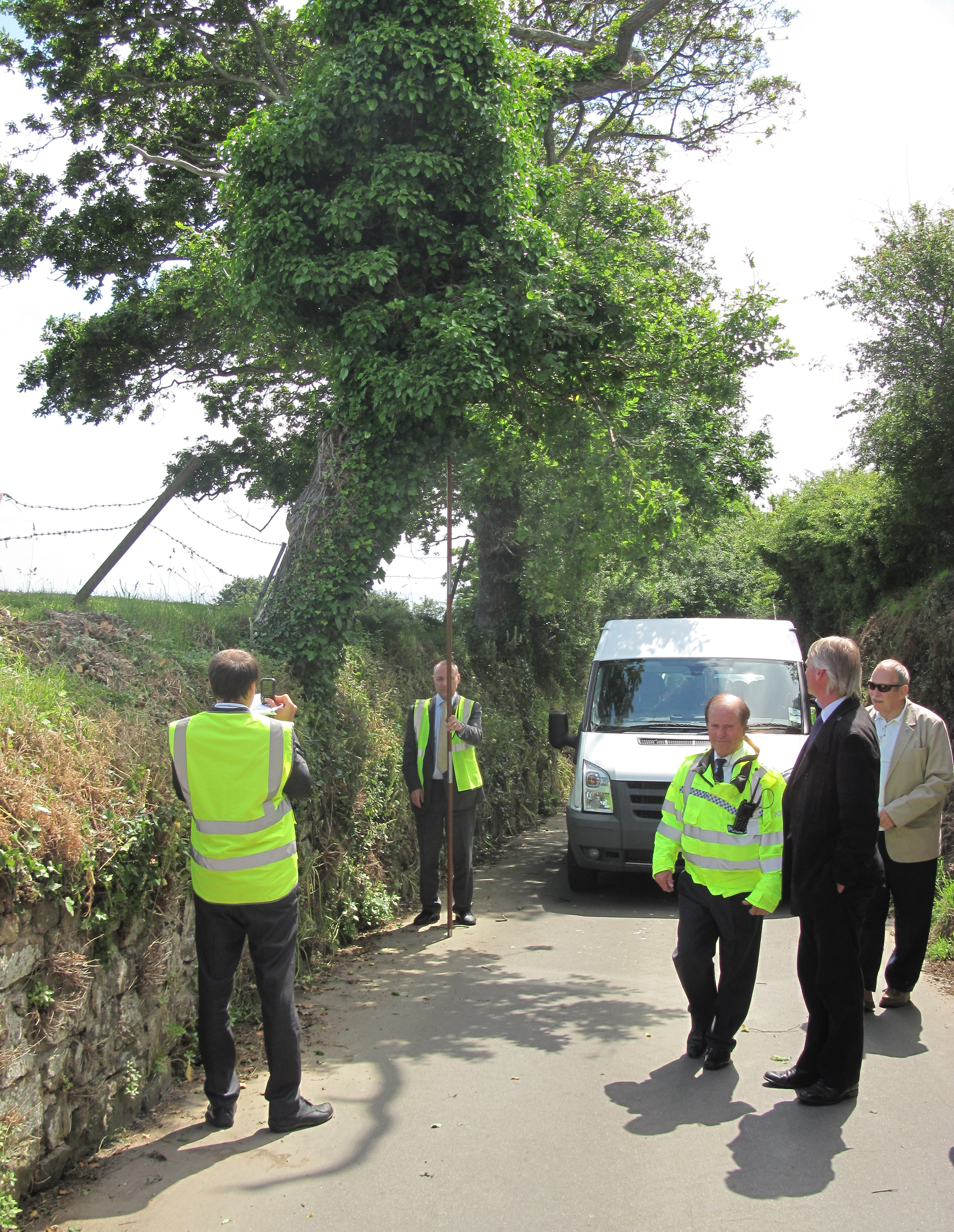
A visite du branchage in St Helier

The Roads Committee gives instructions to Roads Inspectors, whose role is to ensure that parish road repairs and other directions are carried out.

The Parish Assembly elects two roads inspectors for each vingtaine (or cueillette in St Ouen) for a three-year term of office in accordance with the Loi (1914) sur la Voirie. Roads Inspectors are responsible for the repair of by-roads of the parish and have to ensure the instructions of the roads committee are carried out.

Roads Inspectors have functions in relation to the annual visite du branchage and the six-yearly Visite Royale.

In St Helier, Roads Inspectors also have some additional local regulatory functions. The parish states that residents' parking zones are patrolled by the Community Support Team, St Helier's Honorary Police, the Roads Inspector and others authorised by the Connétable; it also says that advertising-board licences must be displayed so that Road Inspectors can identify boards that are not licensed.

== Finances ==
Budgets vary significantly between the twelve parishes. For example, the 2025–26 estimates for St Helier showed expenditure of about £19.3 million, while St Mary budgeted expenditure of £448,300 for the same financial year.

The main source of parish income is the parish rate, which is set annually by each Parish Assembly after it has approved the parish accounts and estimates.

Rates are calculated by reference to the rateable value of land, expressed in "rateable quarters". A monetary rate, expressed as pence per quarter, is applied to the number of quarters assessed for the land. The parish rate consists of two parts: the foncier rate, payable by the owner, and the occupier's rate, payable by the occupier; an owner-occupier is liable for both.

The parishes also collect an island-wide rate, which is paid to the States Treasury rather than retained by the parish. The rate was introduced to provide a contribution towards welfare costs transferred from the parishes to the States’ Income Support system in 2008, but it is no longer hypothecated. In 2025, the island-wide rate raised £17.7 million for the Government of Jersey.

A 2020 Rates Working Group considered whether there should be an island-wide revaluation of rateable quarters and recommended against revaluation. In 2024 the Government of Jersey stated, in response to a freedom of information request, that no further work had taken place after the Comité des Connétables and the Minister for Treasury and Resources accepted the recommendation not to proceed with revaluation.

A 2026 States Assembly scrutiny review recommended that the Government should lead a comprehensive review of the legislative framework governing parish rates, working with the Comité des Connétables, to improve transparency, comparability and public accountability. In the Chief Minister’s response, however, the recommendation was marked as “noted” rather than accepted. The response stated that, although the relevant legislation formally sits with the Chief Minister, the proposal would require detailed consideration by the Comité des Connétables in the first instance. A related recommendation that the Comité, Procureurs du Bien Public and professional advisers should develop a common baseline framework for parish accounts was also marked as a matter for the Comité to consider.

== Accountability and legal oversight ==
Parish administration is subject to several forms of accountability. At parish level, the Parish Assembly approves rates, expenditure and certain contracts, elects many parish officers, and may be convened by requête where ten or more members of the assembly request that a lawful proposition within the assembly's competence be considered. Connétables, Procureurs du Bien Public and honorary police officers are also elected, although different parish offices are elected under different statutory and customary arrangements.

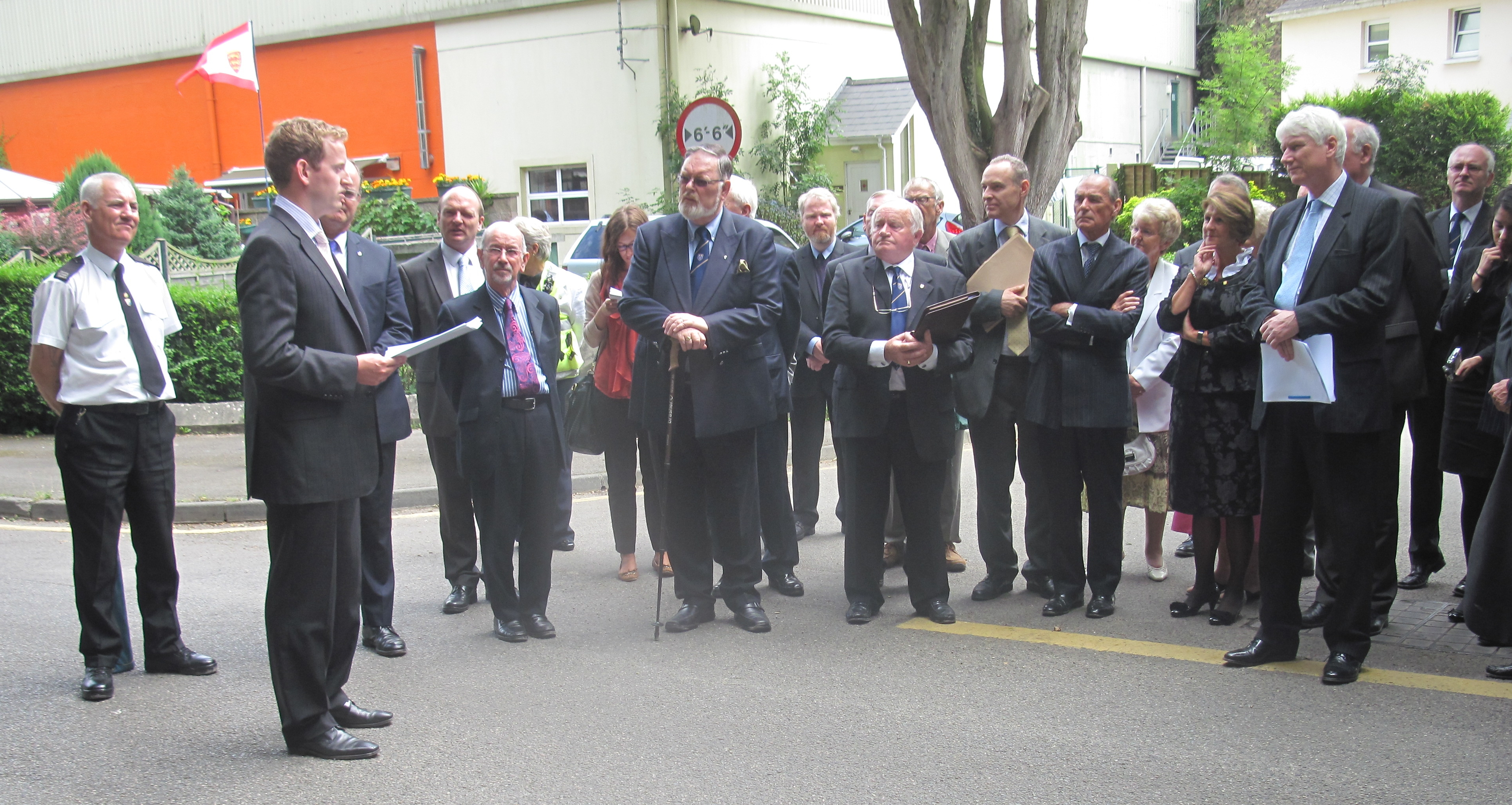
A Visite Royale occurs in a Parish once every six years. The Royal Court of Jersey visits the Parish to sit in session and examine the accounts. The Court also goes on a tour of inspection and adjudicates on matters relating to public roads and footpaths brought to its attention by the parish. Pictured - HM Solicitor-General presents argument in a case of whether the Parish has the right to remove certain dead trees in Bellozanne Valley (2012).

The States of Jersey Complaints Panel does not generally provide an external complaints route for parish administration. The Administrative Decisions (Review) (Jersey) Law 1982 applies to complaints about matters of administration by a Minister, a department of the States, or a person acting on behalf of a Minister or department. Proposals for a Jersey Public Services Ombudsperson have included debate about whether parish authorities should be brought within a new final-stage complaints system. A 2026 report on final-stage complaint handling noted that the Comité des Connétables had opposed the establishment of a Jersey Public Services Ombudsperson during the 2019 consultation, and recommended further engagement with the Comité on parish inclusion in any future scheme.

Complaints about the Honorary Police are dealt with separately from ordinary parish complaints. The Police (Complaints and Conduct) (Jersey) Law 2022 and related regulations provide a statutory framework for complaints and conduct matters involving police officers, including members of the Honorary Police.

The parishes are also subject to legal control by the Royal Court, which has a customary supervisory jurisdiction over the parishes and their officers, including connétables, procureurs and other sworn parish officers. One visible expression of this relationship is the Visite Royale, at which the Royal Court visits a parish every six years and sits in session to examine the accounts; the court also goes on a tour of inspection and adjudicates on matters relating to public roads and footpaths brought to its attention by the parish. Tradition dictates that Visites Royales take place on the first and third Wednesdays in August.

Parish authorities are public authorities for the purposes of the Human Rights (Jersey) Law 2000. Article 7 makes it unlawful for a public authority to act incompatibly with a Convention right, and Government guidance identifies parish authorities as included within the Law's public-authority concept. A 2025 study of reported litigation under the Human Rights (Jersey) Law found 29 challenge cases against public authorities between December 2006 and the end of 2024, but none against parish authorities. Parish decisions may also be challenged judicial review proceedings.

== Cultural significance ==
The parishes have cultural significance in Jersey beyond their administrative functions. A 2026 States Assembly scrutiny review described the parish system as lying at the heart of Jersey's civic, constitutional and community life, and as providing local leadership, democratic participation, practical services and a continuing sense of identity and connection. The Jersey Law Commission has similarly noted that the parish has historically meant more than local administration, signifying identity and roots, and that parish assemblies and honorary service form part of the island's traditional fabric. The Government-backed Island Identity Project identified the Parish Assembly, Honorary Police, Parish Hall Enquiry system, branchage, Visite Royale and parish twinning arrangements as features of Jersey identity “particularly worth celebrating”, while also calling for renewed efforts to engage young people and new arrivals with the parishes.

Each parish has a visual identity in the form of a parish crest, which are present on some street signs. These were created for the visit of George V in 1921. Each parish also has a day, normally the feast day of the parish patron saint (for this reason Grouville and St Martin share a day, as they share a patron saint).

Parish days
Parish(es)	Day
St Brelade	19 January
St Mary	25 March
Trinity	Trinity Sunday
St John	24 June
St Peter	29 June
St Helier	16 July
St Saviour	6 August
St Lawrence	10 August
St Ouen	24 August
St Martin and Grouville	11 November

There are a number of nicknames for residents of the various parishes:

- Grouville and St Clement – enfuntchi (the smoky ones, or dim-witted)
- St Brelade – carpéleuse (caterpillar)
- St Helier – clyichard (town-dweller, 'townie' is also used in Channel Island English)
- St John – nièr tchu (black backsides)
- St John, Trinity and St Martin – nordgien (northerner)
- St Mary – rouôlot, bourdélot (roller, dumpling)
- St Peter – ventre à baînis (limpet)
- St Ouen – gris ventre (grey belly).

== Church and ecclesiastical parish ==
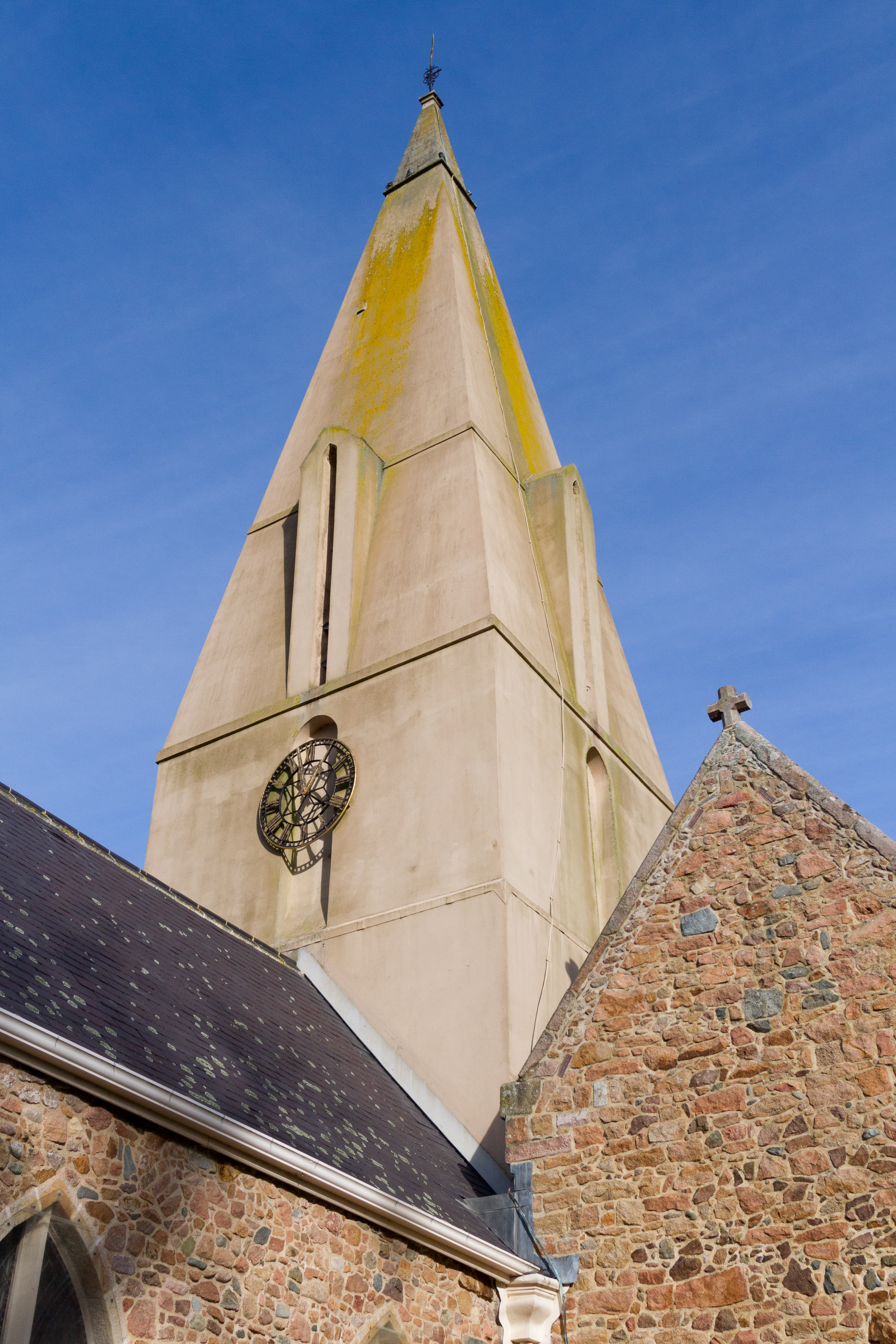
Grouville Church

The parishes originated as ecclesiastical districts and retain institutional links with the Church of England. Each of the twelve ancient parish churches has a Rector, a priest of the Church of England appointed by the Crown, who is the head of the established church within the parish.

Until the reforms of 1948, the twelve parish Rectors also sat in the States as unelected members. The Assembly of the States (Jersey) Law 1948 removed the Rectors and Jurats from the Assembly and introduced Senators, elected on an island-wide basis, alongside an increased number of Deputies. The Dean of Jersey remains an ex officio member, but without a vote.

The Parish Assembly operates in two capacities. For civil business it is presided over by the Connétable; when dealing with ecclesiastical business it is presided over by the Rector and is commonly described as the Ecclesiastical Assembly. Ecclesiastical business includes the appointment of church officers, the examination and approval of their accounts, and matters concerning the repair and maintenance of the parish church, churchyard and rectory.

In the twelve ancient parishes, the church and rectory are not treated simply as Church of England property. The Deanery of Jersey describes the municipal authorities as responsible for the maintenance and repair of both the church and the rectory, which it describes as civil parish, rather than Church of England, properties. This relationship is managed through the Rectorat, which includes the Rector, the Connétable, the two Procureurs du Bien Public and the two churchwardens.

Parish rates may therefore contribute to the upkeep of the ancient parish church, churchyard and rectory. The Rates (Jersey) Law 2005 provides that parish-rate income is applied to the general expenses of the parish, while churches, chapels and cemeteries are exempt from both foncier and occupier's rates, and presbyterial houses and lands are exempt from the foncier rate. The churchwardens administer the ecclesiastical funds known as le Trésor and la Charité. Under the Canons of the Church of England in Jersey, the revenues of the Trésor are to be applied to the repairs, maintenance and needs of the church, churchyard and rectory; works beyond ordinary repairs or urgent preservation require the approval of the Parish Assembly and the appropriate ecclesiastical licence or faculty. Parish accounts show the practical operation of this arrangement: for example, the 2025 accounts of St Brelade state that income generated by church properties is applied through the Trésor towards their maintenance, and that any shortfall in running costs is met by the parish.

The Rector is supported by two churchwardens, known in Jersey as surveillants, and by almoners. The Surveillant Trésor has particular responsibility for the financial aspects of church and rectory maintenance, while the Surveillant Pastoral has pastoral responsibilities.

== Modernisation and reform debates ==
In 2024, the Jersey Law Commission published a topic report on parish assemblies. It concluded that the main laws governing parish assemblies were old, fragmented and mainly in French, and recommended replacing the 1804 and 1905 Laws on parish assemblies with modern legislation in English. The Commission proposed that the new framework should restate the basic rules on membership, voting rights, notice and procedure, while enabling future reforms — such as remote attendance, proxy or postal voting, parish referendums and other procedural changes — to be adopted by the States Assembly without primary legislation.

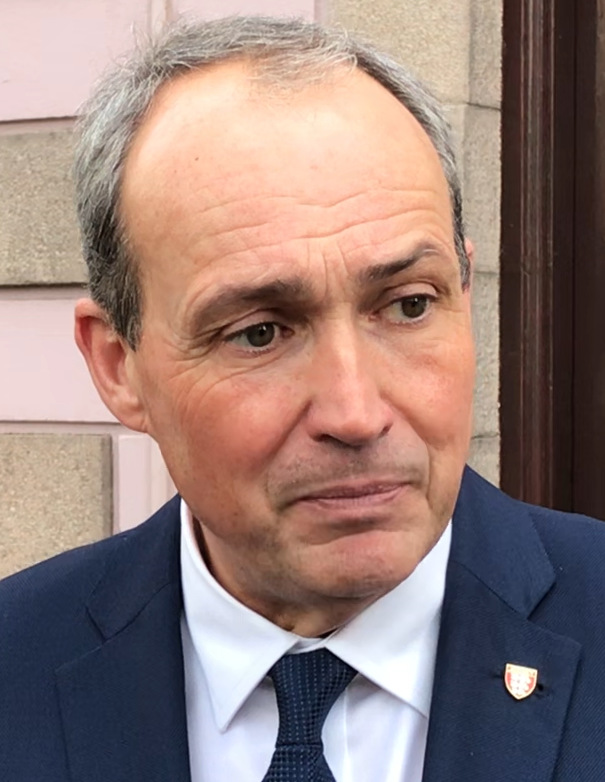
Chief Minister Lyndon Farnham — rejected standardising parish charges or moving towards centralised services or increased government oversight.

In 2025, a States Assembly scrutiny review was established to examine the relationship between the parishes and the Government of Jersey. The review, chaired by Deputy Helen Miles, considered how the two levels of administration worked together to deliver community services and implement shared strategies and policies. During the review, public commentary questioned whether some parish functions should continue to be administered locally. In the Jersey Evening Post, Sir Mark Boleat argued that the review raised a wider question about the proper role of the parishes and the balance between services provided locally and those better done centrally. He identified refuse and recycling collections, electoral registers, dog licences, alcohol licensing recommendations, driving licences and firearms licensing as areas where the case for retaining parish-level administration could be questioned, while suggesting that parish roads presented a stronger case for a continuing substantive parish role.

Ministers and parish representatives defended parish independence during the review. At a public scrutiny hearing in November 2025, Chief Minister Lyndon Farnham and Treasury Minister Elaine Millar said that parish authorities operated separately from central government. They accepted that clearer standards and guidance could be useful, but rejected standardising parish charges or moving towards centralised services or increased government oversight. Connétables have also defended the parishes as locally responsive institutions, arguing that parish administration can deal quickly with practical matters such as missed bin collections, road maintenance and community facilities.

The scrutiny review reported in February 2026. It concluded that modernisation of the parish system was needed, but did not recommend centralising parish powers. The panel found that many parish governance structures and legislative frameworks were historic or outdated, and that clearer arrangements were needed for matters including rates, parish assemblies, inter-parish collaboration and the Comité des Connétables. It recommended improving consistency, sustainability and equity in shared service delivery, particularly honorary policing, refuse and recycling, and play provision; improving transparency and comparability in parish rates and financial governance; and creating more structured engagement between the parishes and the Government of Jersey while respecting local decision-making. The review also recommended longer-term structural reform of firearms certification, including consideration of whether primary responsibility for firearms and ammunition licensing should be transferred from individual parishes to a central statutory authority.

The Chief Minister's response stated that the Government recognised the importance of the parish system and had provided drafting instructions for legislation to replace the old laws governing parish assemblies. The response accepted or noted most of the review's recommendations, while maintaining the distinction between parish autonomy and island-wide government responsibilities.

== See also ==
- Parishes of Guernsey
