= Feudalism in the Channel Islands =

Structure of land ownership in the Channel Islands

From the Middle Ages, the Channel Islands were administered according to a feudal system. Alongside the parishes of Jersey and Guernsey, the fief provided a basic framework for rural life; the system began with the Norman system and largely remained similar to it. Feudalism has retained a more prominent role in the Channel Islands than in the UK. The Channel Islands are remnants of the Duchy of Normandy and are held directly by the Crown on a feudal basis as they are self-governing possessions of the British Crown. This peculiarity underscores the deep-seated influence of feudalism in the Channel Islands; their allegiance is not so much to England but rather directly to the monarch.

== Significance ==
Addressing feudalism would necessitate a distinct kind of association with England. Historically, the fidelity of the local lords played a pivotal role in the Channel Islands' choice to remain under the English monarch. Central to this intricate relationship is the practice and importance of fiefs, deeply ingrained in Norman tradition.

In Normandy, and subsequently in the Channel Islands, fiefs were deemed of utmost significance, as eloquently described in the Coutume de Normandie (the legal customs of Normandy):

Je ne sais pas quelles sont ces dignités qui peuvent être possédés sans fond ni glebe, et pour lesquelles on doit hommage et non relief, à la réserve de certaines sargenteries qui n'ont point de glebe. Ces fiefs en l'air sont fiefs impropres; proprie enim feudum in rebus soli constitit.

transl. I do not know what these dignities are that can be held without foundation or glebe, and for which homage is due and not relief, except for certain sargenteries that have no glebe. These floating fiefs are improper fiefs; for a proper fief rests on tangible assets.

The Coutume elucidates the divergence between Norman and English practices:

(en Normandie) on n'en use pas comme en Angleterre, où les dignités des Ducs & Comtes ne sont pas attachées aux fiefs. Ce sont des dignités personnelles que le ROI donne à qui lui plaît, et tel s'appelle Duc & comte de Warwick, de Northumberland... mais même n'y a rien du tout.

transl. (In Normandy) they do not operate as they do in England, where the titles of Dukes & Counts aren't tethered to fiefs. These are personal titles bestowed by the KING at his discretion, and someone might be named Duke & Count of Warwick, Northumberland... yet they don't hold any tangible property.

This distinction rests upon the inherent value placed on possessing glebe (landed estates) in the Channel Islands. While firmly rooted in Norman traditions, it contrasts sharply with the English approach.

The Channel Islands' feudal tradition is commonly recognized as one of the unique characteristics that distinguish the islands and grants them a special status. As C. Northcote Parkinson once remarked: "Without its feudalism, Guernsey as a tourist resort would be little different from Bognor Regis.". Beyond its cultural and touristic significance, however, scholars have identified the persistence of feudal structures as a critical constitutional anchor for the Bailiwick's autonomy.

By maintaining these ancient tenures and the statutory roles of the Seigneurs within the Royal Court, Guernsey ensures that its legal system remains rooted in Norman Customary Law rather than British parliamentary statutes. The feudal link to the Sovereign, acting solely as Duke of Normandy, prevents the automatic application of UK laws — a distinction that forms the foundational basis for the island's autonomy in matters of taxation and legislation. The system equally preserves unique property and inheritance laws that differ significantly from English law, providing a stable framework for land management rooted in Norman customary practice. Finally, the mandatory participation of Seigneurs in the Court of Chief Pleas ensures that the Royal Court retains its character as a sovereign feudal assembly, protecting the specific constitutional status that allows the Bailiwick to function as a distinct and independent jurisdiction within the framework of the Crown Dependencies.

== Difference with English manors ==
In Guernsey, the concept of a Seigneury or fief carries a significance that transcends the traditional English manor, largely due to the enduring application of Norman laws on the Channel Islands. These laws not only validate but also elevate the importance of these fiefs, making them more than mere historical relics. In the United Kingdom, the enfranchisement of lands has been a common practice, especially following the Copyhold Act 1852, which allowed tenants to demand the conversion of copyhold lands into freeholds. This practice culminated in the Law of Property Act 1922, which effectively extinguished all copyhold tenures, converting them into freeholds as of January 1, 1926. Contrastingly, in the Channel Islands, most feudal dues were transferred to the Crown and subsequently abolished. According to local law, while the rights to feudal dues have been transferred to Her Majesty and Her Royal Successors, the feudal relationships between the Seigneurs and the land remain intact. This means that Seigneurs in Guernsey still maintain a form of proprietary interest in the lands they oversee, which encompasses the preservation of land decorum. This enduring interest has been highlighted through recent legal actions. Notably, the Chefs Tenant du Fief de la Reine in Jersey took legal steps to prevent a local festival on communal land, invoking medieval land rights. In another instance, a company holding a fief in Guernsey required the removal of wrecked cars from their property, demonstrating the active enforcement of their rights. Additionally, hedge veg stall owners in Vazon were ordered to remove their stalls, further evidencing the Seigneurs' influence over land use within their jurisdictions.

The law explicitly states that individuals can continue to use the titles of 'Seigneur' or 'Dame' and that the feudal relationships between Her Majesty and any person holding an interest in a private fief are preserved. This effectively means that a form of feudalism continues to exist in Guernsey, albeit in a modernized context.

In essence, the Seigneuries in Guernsey are not just historical landmarks but living institutions, deeply rooted in the island's legal and cultural fabric, and they continue to have practical implications for land ownership and governance.

== The role of seigneurs ==
David Le Feuvre highlights that the seigneurial system significantly shaped societal structures in Jersey and Guernsey. He posits that seigneurs possess unique characteristics, resembling knights in their sworn duties to the king, and chieftains, because of the significant local influence they wielded. Notably, before the establishment of the Royal Court in Guernsey, justice was administered annually by the bailiff and four knights. Following separation from Normandy during King John's reign, the Court of Chief Pleas was created, comprising the Bailiff, 12 Jurats, and 10 Seigneurs in capite, representing the island's fiefs. This dual role granted seigneurs considerable control over their lands and tenants, demanding not only feudal dues but also personal loyalty.

The 'Squirearchy' or seigneurial class has been paramount in the social hierarchy of Jersey and Guernsey for many centuries, and some of its members still participate annually in the Court of Chief Pleas in Guernsey and the Assize d'Heritage in Jersey. Seigneurs were (and are) commonly referred to by the names of their fiefs and considered (and still consider) themselves part of 'la Noblesse,' aligning with French traditions where nobility commenced at the 'Ecuyer' level, in contrast to the English system where it began with the Baron. This perspective is also supported by contemporary legal analysis, which reinforces the idea that manorial lords—and even more definitively, Norman Seigneurs—act as the living legacy of the original Norman nobility. Considering the Channel Islands as the last vestiges of the Duchy of Normandy, and given their autonomous status under the Crown, it follows that Seigneurs are regarded as the enduring nobility of this distinct legal and cultural entity. Seigneurs from the Channel Islands have consistently shown, and continue to show, a deep connection to Norman traditions and their unique heritage. In 1966, the last reenactment of the Chevauchée de Saint Michel was financed by the Court of Seigneurs. This identity influenced wider societal discourse, as demonstrated by Laurent Carey's mid-18th-century manuscript, a Jurat of the Royal Court. His work, featured in Duncan's Guernsey Magazine, underscores the seigneurs' strong conviction in their Norman ancestry and cultural distinctiveness.

=== Democratic diffusion of influence ===
The allocation of one seigneur per fief, alongside numerous feudal courts—some still operational—underscores a unique judicial system dominated by Norman customary law. These courts, typically adjudicating via tenant juries, offered a community-based form of justice, devoid of the complexities and costs associated with modern legal frameworks. This local court and seigneur network fostered a democratic distribution of power, contrasting with the centralized governance of the United Kingdom. The seigneurial system streamlined civil affairs management and cultivated an educated, culturally significant elite. David Le Feuvre has pointed out that the comprehensive impact of this system on past society, with residual influences possibly persisting into the present, may not have been fully recognized

== Homage and reinvestiture ==
The ceremony of homage and reinvestiture in the Channel Islands is a unique feudal tradition, the only one of its kind still existing in the world today. Unlike the simplified forms of homage in the United Kingdom, this ceremony retains its historical significance and grandeur. Each time the reigning monarch of the United Kingdom visits the Channel Islands, the primary feudal lords, known as seigneurs, from the islands of Jersey and Guernsey participate in this ceremonial homage. These seigneurs are the same individuals who take part in the Court of Chief Pleas in Guernsey and the Assize d'Héritage in Jersey.

During this event, the seigneurs reaffirm their vassalage to the Crown and are ceremonially reinvested in their tenures. The ceremony is conducted in French, the traditional language of the Channel Islands' legal and feudal proceedings. Typically, one or more seigneurs will act on behalf of all others during the ceremony.

A recent example of this ceremony was highlighted in a BBC article, which outlines the continuing importance of this tradition in the Channel Islands.

=== The ceremony ===
The ceremony begins with the Lieutenant-Governor and the Bailiff, who escort the seigneur to His Majesty. The seigneur bows and kneels before the monarch, placing his hands together, palm to palm. The monarch then places His hands outside those of the seigneur, signifying the mutual bond of loyalty and service.

The seigneur declares his loyalty with the words: "Souverain Sire, je demeure votre homme lige à vous porter Foy et Hommage contre tous." (Translation: "Sovereign Lord, I remain your liege man, to bear Faith and Homage to you against all.")

His Majesty responds: "Nous vous acceptons, advouant tous vos légitimes droits et possessions relevant de cette teneure de nous, sauf pareillement à tous Nos droits de Régalité." (Translation: "We accept you, acknowledging all your legitimate rights and possessions deriving from this tenure of ours, subject equally to all Our rights of Regality.")

This ancient ritual underscores the continuing historical and cultural ties between the Crown and the Channel Islands, preserving a feudal relationship that has endured for centuries. Video of the Ceremony in Guernsey and Video of the Ceremony in Jersey

The ceremony of homage is not merely symbolic — which explains why it continues to be performed in full today, and is carried out separately for each Bailiwick and for Sark: it constitutes the formal renewal of the feudal contract between the Sovereign and the island's chief tenants. The words spoken by the monarch — acknowledging all your legitimate rights and possessions deriving from this tenure — confirm that the Seigneurs' authority over their fiefs derives directly from the Crown in its capacity as Duke of Normandy, not from any Act of Parliament. This is the very basis of the islands' autonomy: the Channel Islands are not governed by Westminster but through the personal feudal relationship between the Duke of Normandy and his tenants, who chose to remain faithful to the Crown when Normandy was lost to France in 1204. In this relationship, the Seigneurs represent the land itself — they are the territorial link between the Crown and the island. The Seigneurs performing homage are therefore not merely fulfilling a private obligation — they are publicly renewing, on behalf of the territory they hold, the constitutional arrangement upon which the autonomy of the entire Bailiwick depends.

== Jersey ==
In Jersey, the dues, services and rents owed by tenants were extensive and often onerous. Jersey peasants retained a degree of freedom lost elsewhere, probably due to the insignificance of the island in the Duchy of Normandy. More is known of the origins of the fief than of the parishes and early documents show that Jersey was thoroughly feudalised (the majority of the residents were tenants holding land from seigneurs). The fief of St Ouen, the most senior fief in Jersey's feudal structure, was by 1135 in the hands of the de Carteret family. They held extensive lands in Carteret as well, but these were lost by them after King John's loss of Normandy, so they decided to settle on the island. Between the 12th and 20th centuries, there were an estimated 245 fiefs in Jersey, though not all simultaneously.

Feudal titles may be sold – for example, after passing through 19 generations of the same family, the Seigneur of the Fief ès Poingdestre sold his title to an American citizen in 2022 with the £55,000 proceeds going to charity.

=== Feudalism and the right of the foreshore in Jersey ===
The ownership of the foreshore in Jersey, defined as the land stretching from high to low water marks, has historically been a complex legal matter, reflecting an interplay between ancient feudal rights and modern legal claims.

A pivotal case, HM Receiver General v Selab Securities Ltd, 1985, highlights the challenges in determining such ownership. In this case, Selab Securities claimed the land up to the wall of the Fief de Samare's, asserting it was part of the original foreshore. However, the court settled this on a preliminary point regarding prescription, avoiding a definitive ruling on ownership.

The controversy escalated with the Foreshore of the Fief de la Fosse in the 1990s and early 2000s. Les Pas Holdings Ltd, having obtained the Seigneur's rights in 1986, contested the Crown's claims. The dispute culminated in a notable settlement in 2003, wherein Les Pas Holdings agreed to relinquish their claim in favor of the Crown for a sum, leading to the development of the Castle Quay by Dandara, financed by a £10 million transaction.

In the instance of the Fief de Samare's, when the Seigneur passed without an heir, the property defaulted to the Seigneur of the Fief de Samares. The foreshore in question, previously granted to the Girl Guides in 1985, thus remained under the control of the seigneurial estate, not the Crown.

These three cases' inclusion in a 2019 parliamentary report underscores their continuing relevance and the ongoing debate over the ownership of Jersey's foreshore. They illustrate the enduring nature of feudal rights amid modern governance and serve as a poignant reminder of the Channel Islands' unique legal landscape

== Guernsey ==
Guernsey still has feudal law and legal fiefs in existence. Each fief has a seigneur and/or dame that owns the fief. The Guernsey fiefs and seigneurs have long existed before baronies and are part of Normandy. While nobility has been outlawed in France and Germany, noble fiefs still exist by law in Guernsey. The owners of the fiefs convene each year at the Court of Chief Pleas under the supervision of His Majesty's Government (the owners of private fiefs convening at Chief Pleas are called "Secular Seigneurs" or "temporal Lords". The term 'Temporal Lord' used for participants in the Chief Pleas echoes that applied to members of the United Kingdom's House of Lords. This nomenclature indicates a shared historical foundation in the 'Curia Regis'—the royal councils of the UK and of Normandy, which subsequently included the Channel Islands. The feudal system allowed for lords to participate in these councils, and over time, the systems in the Channel Islands developed independently. Presently, the title of 'Spiritual Lord' is obsolete within the Chief Pleas, as ecclesiastical fiefs have been assumed by the Crown. There are approximately 24 private fiefs in Guernsey that are registered directly with The Crown.

=== Feudal cadastre map in Guernsey ===
The Land Registry, through the States of Guernsey Cadastre online platform, maintains a map of feudal estates.

=== Feudal layout of Guernsey ===
The current feudal layout of Guernsey was primarily established between 1020 and 1248. The early phases of feudalism during this period were crucial in shaping the island's feudal structure. The transition from absentee to resident lords, the consolidation of power by families such as the de Chesneys, and the establishment of the Royal Court laid the foundation for the social and political order that would endure in Guernsey for centuries.

=== Early history of feudalism in Guernsey (1020-1248) ===
The early history of feudalism in Guernsey is marked by the establishment and consolidation of feudal lordships, deeply rooted in the island's Norman heritage. The period before 1248 saw the foundation of the primary feudal structure that would shape Guernsey's social and political landscape for centuries.

==== Phase 1: Initial grants and ecclesiastical influence (1020 - 1061) ====
The first phase of feudal development in Guernsey began around 1020, with the original grants of two key fiefs: Bessin (West) and Cotentin (East). These grants were made by the Dukes of Normandy to loyal followers and ecclesiastical institutions. The fief of Saint Michel, which formed part of the fief of Cotentin, was granted by Duke William II to the Abbey of Mont-Saint-Michel, highlighting the significant ecclesiastical influence in the region.

During this phase, most of the feudal lords were absentee landlords, meaning they did not reside on the island but managed their estates from the mainland. This absenteeism limited the direct impact of feudal lords on the local population, and the feudal system was largely characterized by the indirect control of these distant lords. There is no proof that these fiefs had the same honor as the corresponding fiefs on the mainland.

==== Phase 2: Establishment of resident lords (1061 - 1069 or later) ====
The second phase of feudalism in Guernsey involved the establishment of resident lords. According to local tradition, this phase began in 1061 with the creation of the Fief d'Anneville by Samson d'Ansneville. The lore emphasizes that the island's structure was already in place before the Norman Conquest of England and states that Samson was commissioned by Duke William of Normandy to drive out pirates who had taken up residence on the island. After successfully securing Guernsey, Samson was rewarded by the Duke with a quarter of the island, thus establishing the Fief d'Anneville. The other quarter was granted to the Abbey of Mont-Saint-Michel as the Fief Saint Michel.

The creation of the Fief d'Anneville marked a significant moment in the island's transition from absentee to resident lordship. Unlike their absentee predecessors, resident lords like Samson d'Ansneville had a direct and immediate presence on the island, allowing them to exert more control and influence over local affairs. This phase laid the groundwork for the island's feudal system, establishing the close relationship between the ruling class and the local population that would characterize Guernsey's social structure for centuries.

Historians such as Ferdinand Brock Tupper and Jonathan Duncan, in their respective works, emphasize the importance of this phase in consolidating the feudal structure of Guernsey. The establishment of resident lords not only fortified the island's defenses but also fostered the development of local governance and legal institutions that would later evolve into the Royal Court.

==== Phase 3: The Anarchy (1135–1154) and feudal re-configuration ====
During the Anarchy (1135–1154) many Anglo-Norman magnates—among them Ranulf de Gernon, Earl of Chester—shifted their allegiance between King Stephen and Empress Matilda; by contrast the d'Anneville family on Guernsey stayed consistently Angevin, a loyalty that helped them preserve and occasionally enlarge their holdings. Sometime between 1144 and 1154 the "Fief du Bessin" held by the earls of Chester lost its comital privileges and re-emerged in the sources under the new style "Fief Le Comte," a name that foregrounded the lords' honorific title ("le comte") rather than the territorial label "Bessin." In the same re-distribution window a new ecclesiastical lordship—*Fief Saint-Michel*—was carved out of former comital land and granted to the abbey of Mont-Saint-Michel as spiritual endowment, creating a dual lay/monastic pattern later confirmed in the Cartulaire (doc. 129, c. 1150). After Henry II's accession in 1154 the Crown curtailed several over-mighty barons by redistributing confiscated estates. On Guernsey that the Fief Le Comte was subdivided after its renaming confirms its diminished standing in the feudal hierarchy; one share passed to the Wake family and, by 1168, Hugh Wake could donate his portion—later called Le Fief de Longues in St Saviour's—to Longues Abbey in Normandy. Following Baldwin Wake's death in 1213, his son Hugh inherited Le Comte and later sold it in 1239/40 to Baldwin de Ver before departing on crusade. The de Ver family held the fief thereafter, with Robert de Ver recorded as seigneur in 1248, succeeded by his minor son Baldwin, who came under the guardianship of Hugh Bigot, the same noble who leased the fief to William de Chesney. The new feudal hierarchy is confirmed by a charter dated 22 April 1253: Sir William de Chesney, seigneur of Anneville, granted to Abbot Richard of Mont-Saint-Michel the wardship of "all the lands in Guernsey that had belonged to Robert de Vere," to be held until his heirs came of age, in exchange for an annual quit-rent of £25, recoverable before the king's justices at Exeter.

Because Norman custom permitted the garde noble to be conferred only by an overlord (chef-seigneur), the charter demonstrates that Mont-Saint-Michel recognized Anneville's intermediate suzerainty over the Fief Le Comte, as evidenced by Anneville's right to administer the garde noble—a prerogative strictly reserved by Norman feudal law to those holding genuine feudal superiority. The 1253 charter therefore stands as compelling evidence of the island‑wide redistribution of fiefs that began after 1144: older domains such as the Fief du Bessin lost their independent status, were fragmented, and placed in sub-tenure under crown-loyal lordships. The absence of Royal Court oversight in both the 1253 charter and the 1262 sale of Le Comte—transactions conducted entirely through private agreement—strongly suggests that the fief had already lost its status as a direct royal tenure. Under the Coutume de Normandie, such acts involving a tenure en chef would have required royal assent and court registration. This procedural silence indicates that Le Comte was no longer treated as a sovereign or independently represented fief, but rather as subordinate—likely to Anneville, as later confirmed by the 1350 partage—explaining its exclusion from the Chief Pleas despite its prestigious origin in the Fief du Bessin.The durability of this new order is demonstrated by the partage of the de Cheney succession drawn up at Anneville in 1350, where the droit de réversion of the Fief Le Comte is expressly assigned to the seigneur of Anneville. (According to Norman custom, the droit de réversion can only belong to the superior fief).

After the loss of mainland Normandy to France in 1204 the abbey tried again (1266) to enforce its claim, but the Crown confirmed Anneville's supremacy, probably to limit external influence from the Norman mainland. The same stance prevailed at the Assizes of 1299 and 1309, where the fief of Anneville successfully defended rights over wreck, chase and court on the king's fief.

After the loss of mainland Normandy to France in 1204 the abbey tried again (1266) to enforce its claim, but the Crown confirmed Anneville's supremacy, probably to limit external influence from the Norman mainland. The same stance prevailed at the Assizes of 1299 and 1309, where the fief of Anneville successfully defended rights over wreck, chase and court on the king's fief.

==== Phase 4: Expansion and consolidation of feudal power (1204 - 1248) ====
The third phase began in 1204, following the loss of Normandy by King John to Philip Augustus of France. This period saw significant changes in land ownership on the island. Many Norman lords who sided with the French King were dispossessed of their lands, which then passed into the hands of local Guernsey families or were retained by the Crown.

In 1248, the fief d'Anneville was transferred to Sir William de Chesney (also known as de Cheny or de Chene), a relative of the Governor of the Isles, Philip d'Aubigny. Sir William was an influential figure at the court of Henry III and held a prominent position in insular affairs. In 1253, he acquired the Fief du Comte from Baldwin de Vere. As Seigneurs of Anneville and a large part of the island, the de Chesney family continued to hold a significant position in insular affairs for the next two and a half centuries, even though they only occasionally resided on the island.

The de Chesney family's acquisition marked a key moment in the consolidation of feudal power on the island, as their influence extended across multiple fiefs, thereby reducing the distinctions between the various original fiefs of Bessin and Cotentin.

=== Royal Court of Guernsey ===
The establishment of the Royal Court of Guernsey during this period formalized the island's feudal legal system, introducing jurats who played a crucial role in local governance. The seigneurs, connétables, and the Bailiff were also present in the Court. This period also saw the beginning of the integration of the feudal estates into a more unified system of land ownership, which laid the foundation for the island's enduring social and political structures.

The earliest evidence for the existence of a Royal Court in Guernsey appears in the Great Roll of the Norman Exchequer of 1180, which records a court presided over by a royal officer. This official administered justice through the judgments of the chief tenants — also known as the suitors of the Duke's court — who were bound to attend and participate in its proceedings. It is likely that the fiefs admitted to the modern Court reflect the exact territorial divisions established during this early period. Families such as the lords of Anneville, documented as holding a chief tenancy at the time, illustrate the continuity of this tradition. The principle of the necessary presence of the vassals, known as Curia Integra, was articulated by Guillaume Terrien in his Commentaire du droit civil (1574), which defines the Court of the Duke as a "Justice" composed of officers and vassals, formally constituted only when those who owe assistance to the Sovereign are present. Henri Basnage further clarified, in his Commentaire sur la Coutume de Normandie (1709), that the Suite de Cour (Secta Curiae) owed by holders of noble fiefs is a public duty (servitium) rather than a private right, linking the possession of the fief to active participation in the Sovereign's jurisdiction. This feudal structure remains visible today in the Court of Chief Pleas, where suitors representing the island's fiefs are still summoned each year.

This feudal structure remains visible today in the Court of Chief Pleas. Here, the formal answer of 'Present' by the Seigneurs is a jurisdictional act rooted in the principle of Curia Integra. As established in the Kilbrandon Report (Para. 1462-1463), this act provides the judicial evidence that the 'Bailiwick as a Fief of the Crown' remains active and legally binding.

The constitutional weight of this duty is confirmed by The Court of Chief Pleas (Guernsey) Law, 2004, which mandates that a Seigneur’s absence must be covered by a formal legal representation (an Advocate of the Royal Court). This confirms that the presence of the Fief is a technical prerequisite for the assembly’s validity, ensuring the Sovereign's authority continues to derive from the Ducal Prerogative rather than Westminster's supremacy. The institution, shaped by these historic tenures, remains a unique survival of Norman legal practice under the English Crown, distinct from the English Curia Regis — which evolved into the Parliament and the House of Lords — underscoring that the Channel Islands developed their own independent constitutional trajectory, separate from that of the Kingdom of England.

=== Modern Legal Status and Constitutional Role ===
The modern legal framework governing feudal relationships in Guernsey rests on two distinct statutes. The Feudal Dues (Guernsey) Law, 1980 preserves, under Section 4, the right of fief-holders to bear the titles of Seigneur and Dame. The Court of Chief Pleas (Guernsey) Law, 2004 governs the statutory duty of attendance at the annual Court of Chief Pleas. Together, these instruments confirm that feudalism in the Bailiwick remains an active body of law, not a medieval curiosity.

Under the 2004 Law, the duty of certain Seigneurs to attend to pay suit of court or do homage at the annual Michaelmas sitting of the Court of Chief Pleas remains a recognised legal obligation rooted in Norman customary law (section 3). The Schedule to the Law lists eleven fiefs whose holders bear this duty: Blanchelande, Anneville, Sausmarez, Bruniaux de St Martin, Mauxmarquis, Bruniaux de Noirmont, Vaugrat, Philippes, Canelly, Fantôme and Rohais. This distinguishes the role of these Seigneurs from purely honorary feudal titles that survive elsewhere: in Guernsey, the Seigneur performs a constitutional function within the island's judicial institutions that has no equivalent in any other European jurisdiction.

This institutional duty reflects a deeper constitutional logic. The relationship of the Channel Islands — Guernsey, Jersey, and Sark — with the British Crown derives not from parliamentary statute but from the personal feudal bond between the Sovereign, in the capacity of Duke of Normandy, and the islands' chief tenants. As the Channel Islands' status as self-governing dependencies derives from their Norman heritage rather than from Acts of Parliament, the Seigneurs attending Chief Pleas embody the continuity of this distinct constitutional tradition. The Seigneurs attending Chief Pleas in Guernsey, like their counterparts at the Assize d'Héritage in Jersey and the Chief Pleas of Sark, thus represent the institutional link between the Crown and the autonomous land systems of the Bailiwicks. The 2004 Law, by preserving the feudal relationships between His Majesty and private fief-holders, enshrines this bond in contemporary legislation, preserving the constitutional specificity of the Bailiwick.

=== Phasing out of feudal dues and uphold of the feudal relationships ===
Feudal dues were historical levies imposed by the seigneurs and dames on properties within their jurisdictions. In Guernsey, these dues persisted until the late 20th century, adding substantial amounts to local conveyancing costs. Although several of these dues, such as poulage (once two fowls, later valued at 37 pence), were often seen as quaint remnants of the past, the one that stirred the most contention was the treizieme. Also known as congé, this charge was imposed by the seigneur on any property sale within his fief, essentially as a fee for his permission to buy the property. Historically, it represented a thirteenth of the sale price, but in Guernsey, it had been 2% for about a century.

As reported by an article of "The Financial Times", over time, especially post-World War II with inflation and Guernsey's rising appeal as a tax refuge, the value and implications of these dues became more significant. The revenues from congé saw a marked increase from £6,000 in 1960 to £100,000 by 1976, benefitting the island's private fief-holders. Efforts to abolish these dues started in earnest around 1969, driven by the financial pressures they placed on locals, especially with rising property prices.

By 1977, local parliamentarians had attempted to abolish all feudal dues, offering a lump-sum compensation to fief-holders. However, the largest fief-holder in Guernsey is the Monarch, whose revenues from Elizabeth II's fiefs were returned to the Island government for specific purposes. While she signalled no objection to the abolishment of these dues, the practical implications would mean a significant loss in revenue for the island government.

Tensions heightened as private seigneurs felt undercompensated. A noteworthy intervention came in the form of a petition to the Privy Council in 1977, where seigneurs and dames contended that the proposed legislation amounted to expropriation of their hereditary rights. A visit by the Queen and Prince Philip to Guernsey around this time further spotlighted the issue.

The deadlock persisted until an agreement was reached, primarily through the efforts of prominent figures like Cecil de Sausmarez, Guernsey's senior seigneur, and Mr. Peter Dorey, Guernsey's former 'chancellor'. The consensus was that feudal dues would remain but be payable to the Crown, effectively rerouting the money to the island government. As a compromise, seigneurs and dames would receive a portion of the congé collected on their fiefs for the first five years, tax-free.

The overall shift signalled a phasing out of private feudal dues in Guernsey. The local government would now collect the dues, a change that reportedly seemed more palatable to the island's residents compared to the earlier system.

==== Further modifications in 2002 ====
The law was again modified in 2002. While it abolished most monetary aspects of daily transactions, it explicitly upheld:

- The feudal relationship (and any associated rights and obligations) between Her Majesty and persons with interests in a fief;
- The customary law regarding the consents and permissions needed for fief transactions;
- The right for individuals to continue using the titles 'Seigneur' and 'Dame'.

The legislative pattern of the reforms of 1980, 2002, and 2004 is notable for what it preserved as much as for what it abolished. While the economic privileges of feudalism were progressively dismantled, the legislature explicitly maintained the feudal relationship between the Crown and fief-holders—the legal framework that classifies the land as Norman tenure rather than English freehold. Under the Coutume de Normandie, feudal tenure requires the existence of both a lord (the Sovereign as Duke) and a vassal (the Seigneur); the preservation of both the titles and the relationship ensures that this dual structure remains legally intact. The constitutional importance of this fact is underscored by comparison: in the Isle of Man—the other feudal dominion of the Crown—the Isle of Man Purchase Act 1765 transferred the lordship from the Dukes of Atholl directly to the Crown, eliminating the intermediate feudal lordship; the Act was enacted precisely to bring the island under British customs control, and the island today operates within the UK customs and VAT system. The Channel Islands, which preserved even in recent laws this feudal layer and the direct relationship between the Crown and its fief-holders, have maintained their customs and fiscal autonomy, the land having remained Norman in law rather than English.

== Cultural and legal recognition of fiefs ==
Despite the abolition of feudal duties, fiefs retain significant legal and cultural standing across the Bailiwick. This Norman framework is further confirmed by the presence of an independent Royal fief within the Bailiwick itself, namely that of Sark, which was considered the last feudal state in Europe until the enactment of the Reform (Sark) Law, 2008,

== Anneville ==
The Seigneurie and Fief of Anneville is one of Guernsey's most historically significant Norman lordships. It occupies part of the parish of Saint Sampson and appears on multiple early maps of the island, including those by Reyner Wolfe (1572), Gerardus Mercator (1595), and Herman Moll (1724).

Local tradition says the fief originated with Samson d'Anneville (or d'Ansneville), who, after expelling pirates from Guernsey, was granted a quarter of the island. Historical documents refer to multiple families controlling Anneville over the centuries. One of the most prominent was the de Chesney family (13th–15th centuries). Members of this family served as Governors and Bailiffs of Guernsey, and under them the fief expanded to encompass other sub-fiefs.

Anneville subsequently passed through various notable familiesillustrating how Guernsey's feudal estates could shift hands yet retain their legal identity. Among these were the Fouashin family—Nicholas Fouashin served as Gentleman Usher to King Henry VIII—and the Andros family. Sir Edmund Andros (1637–1714), a prominent member, became Governor of various North American colonies, reflecting Anneville's historic links beyond Guernsey.

=== Anneville Manor ===
At the centre of the fief stands Anneville Manor, a historically significant building on Rue des Annevilles. Recognised as a Protected Building under Guernsey's Development & Planning laws since 1969, the manor includes notable architectural features such as a Gothic porch, preserved in excellent condition and resembling that of the Vale Church.

North of the manor is the historic garenne (medieval rabbit warren). The Garenne d'Anneville is a rare surviving example of medieval land management practices on Guernsey. Surrounded by a dry ditch, the garenne dates from medieval times and was specifically noted during land confirmations from the reign of Henry IV. Today, parts of this warren have been maintained for conservation purposes, contributing to the site's unique historical landscape.

=== Cultural significance ===
Anneville is also associated with the historian and author Cyril Northcote Parkinson (1909–1993), famous for formulating "Parkinson's Law." Parkinson owned Anneville during the mid-to-late 20th century, revitalising its feudal traditions and featuring the manor prominently in his writings. In his historical novel So Near, So Far, Parkinson vividly describes Anneville Manor as a granite-built residence with battlement-like features, contributing to its cultural recognition.

Today, Anneville remains subject to the Royal Court of Chief Pleas' requirement for suit of court, reflecting Guernsey's longstanding custom that certain private fiefs attend the court. This legal framework demonstrates how vestiges of the island's feudal origins continue to shape property law and local governance in the 21st century.

== Sark ==
The tiny island of Sark was arguably the last feudal state in Europe which ended after 450 years in 2008. The island was a fiefdom of Guernsey and administered independently by a Seigneur, who was a vassal to the land's owner, the Monarchy of the United Kingdom. Sark's ruling body voted on 4 October 2006 to replace the remaining tenement seats in Chief Pleas with a fully-elected democratic government, which was implemented on 9 April 2008. About Feudal dues, in 2006 the seigneur of Sark agreed to relinquish the ancient right of treizieme in exchange for an index-linked payment of £28,000 a year.

== See also ==
- Examples of feudalism
- Feudalism in England
- France in the Middle Ages
- History of Jersey
- History of Guernsey
- History of Normandy
- Manorialism
