= St Helier Town Hall =

Parliament building in St Helier, Jersey

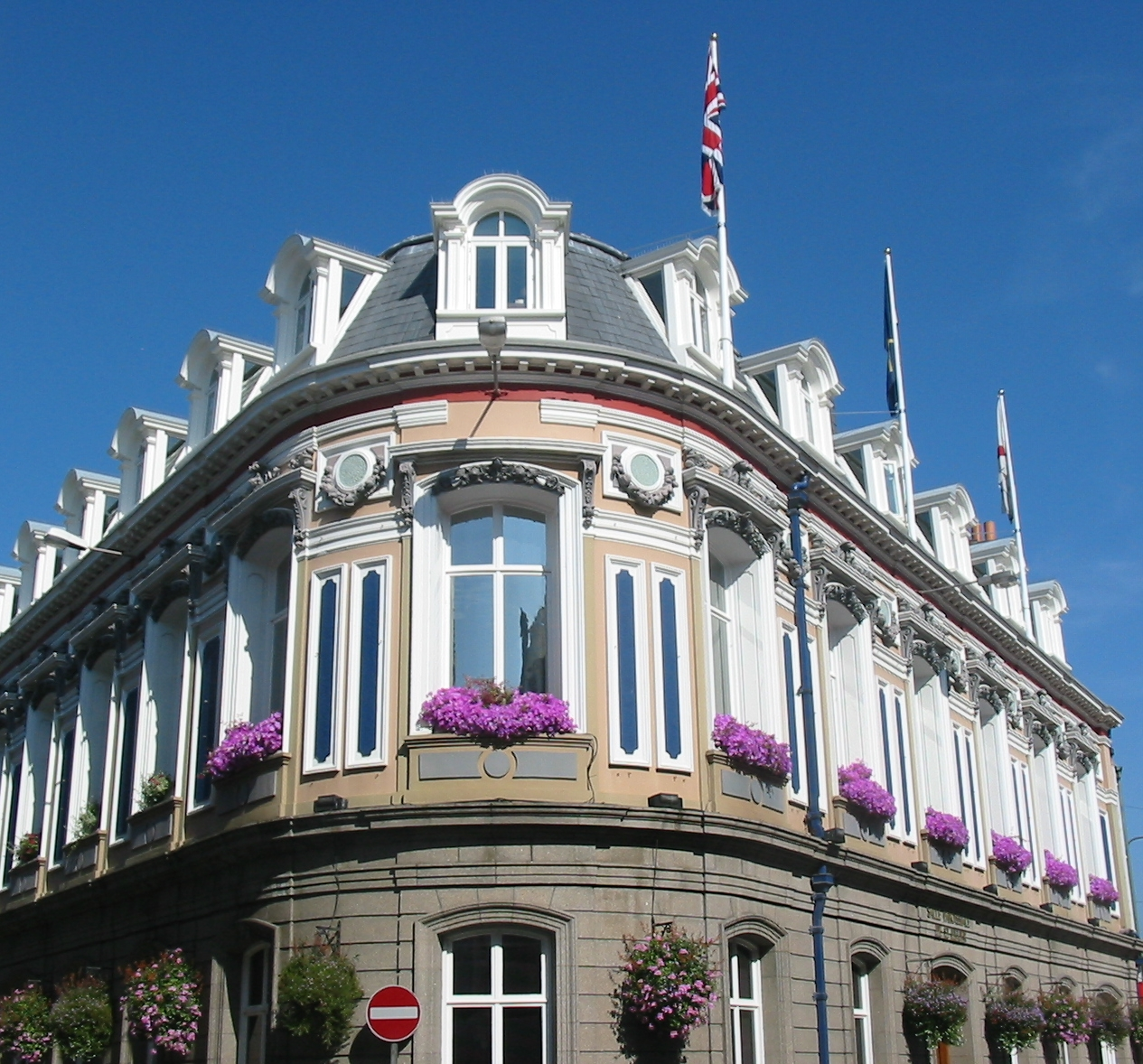
- The building in July 2005
- Interactive map of St Helier Town Hall
- Location: York Street, St Helier
- Coordinates: 49.1859°N 2.1098°W
- Built: 1872
- Architect: Philippe Le Sueur and Philippe Bree
- Architectural style: Renaissance style

St Helier Town hall also known as St Helier Parish Hall (French: La Salle Pârouaîssiale) is the meeting place of St Helier Parish Assembly. It is located on the corner of Seale Street and York Street in St Helier, Jersey.

== History ==
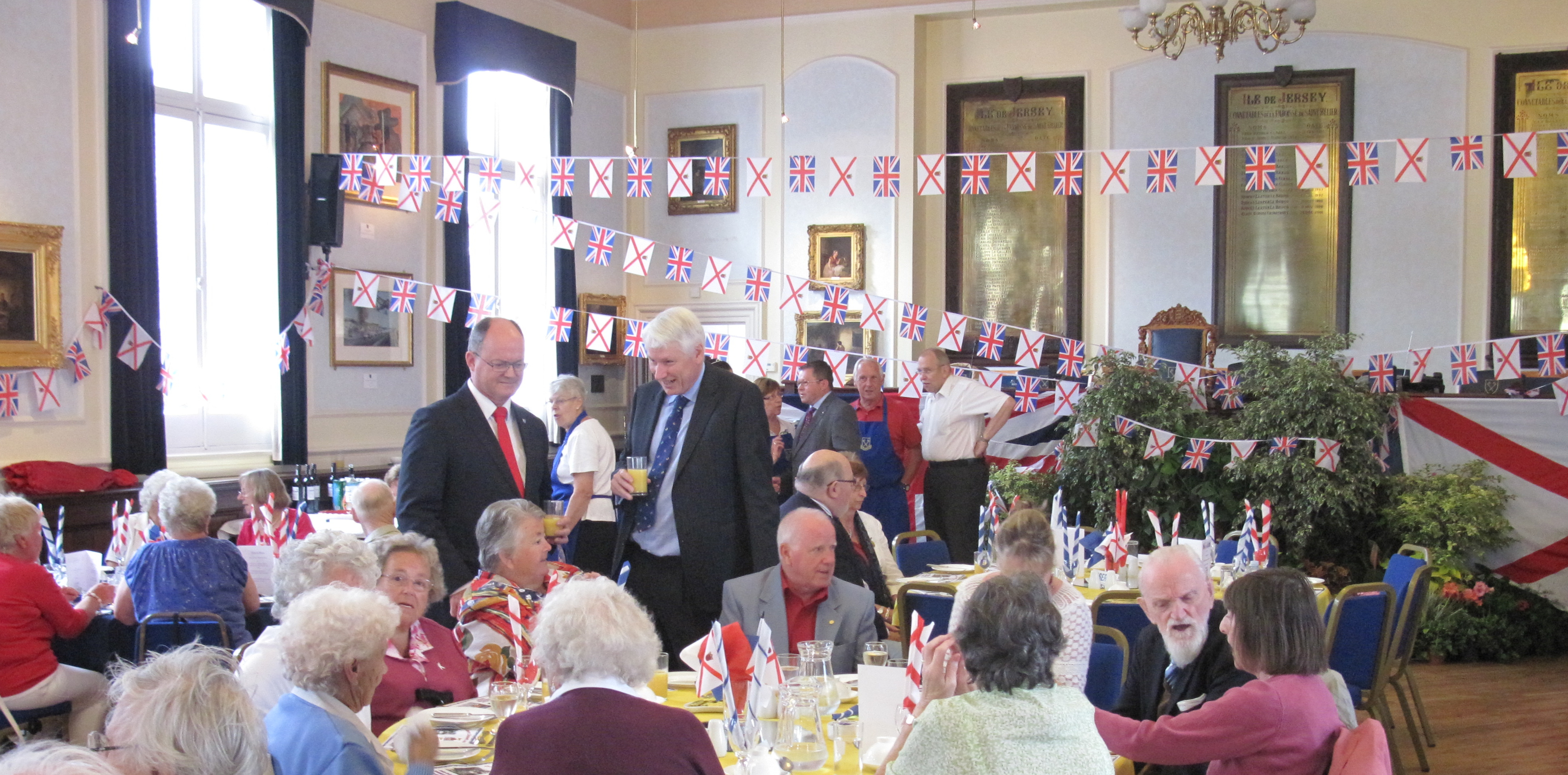
The assembly room

Following the Treaty of Paris, which ended the Napoleonic Wars, there was a significant increase in the population of St Helier, as English-speaking people arrived by steamship to live in the town. In this context, in 1830, the parish assembly selected The Royal Yacht Hotel in Caledonia Place as the venue for its meetings. The hotel, which had been established in the 1820s, continued to serve as home of the parish assembly for the next half-century.

In the mid-19th century, the parish assembly decided to commission a purpose-built municipal building which was intended to serve, not just as the parish office, but also as the local police station. The site they selected was on the corner of Seale Street and York Street. The building was designed by Philippe Le Sueur and Philippe Bree in the Renaissance style, built in ashlar stone and was completed in 1872.

The design involved a curved main frontage on the corner of the two streets with a frontage of 12 bays along Searle Street and another frontage of six bays along York Street. The building was faced in granite on the ground floor and with stucco on the first floor. Although the main entrance, formed by a segmental headed doorway with an archivolt, was on York Street, there were three more doorways on Searle Street. The building was fenestrated by segmental headed windows on both floors. The windows on the first floor were separated by bi-partite painted panels which were surmounted by medallions surrounded by garlands. There were round headed dormer windows at attic level. Internally, the principal room was the assembly hall. Following the formation of a local fire service in 1900, the town hall also served as a fire station from 1902.

Works of art in town hall include a notable painting by John Singleton Copley depicting the death of Major Francis Peirson at the Battle of Jersey on 6 January 1781 during the Anglo-French War. There are also landscape paintings depicting various scenes by various artists including John Le Capelain, Charles H. Poingdestre, and Petrus van Schendel.
