= St Mary, Jersey =

Parish in western Jersey

Coordinates: 49.24136°N 2.18697°W

Saint Mary Sainte-Marie (French) Sainte Mathie (Norman)
- Parish
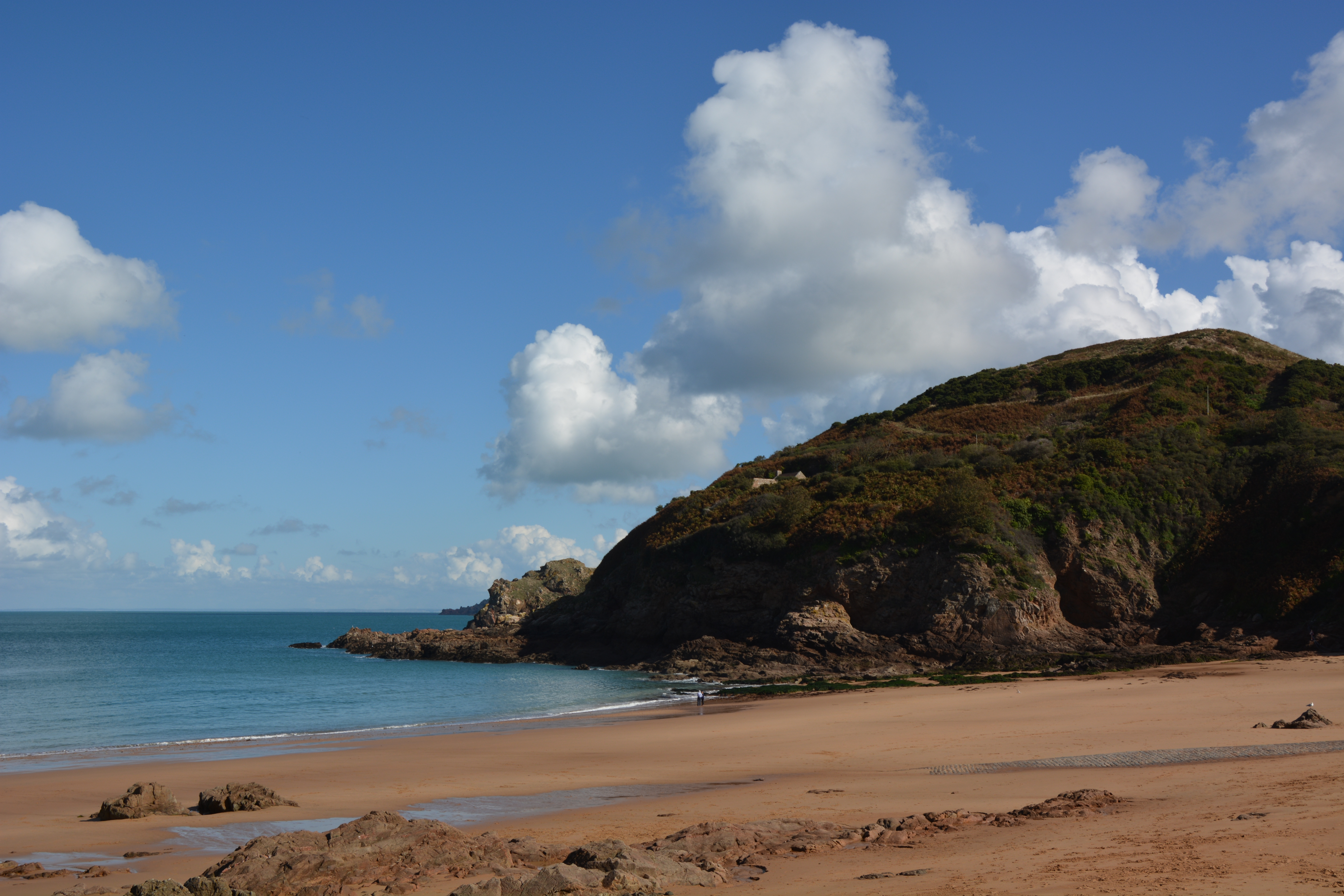
- Grève de Lecq in St Mary

- Flag Coat of arms

- Location of Saint Mary in Jersey
- Crown Dependency: Jersey, Channel Islands

Government
  - Type: Parish
  - Connétable: David Johnson

Area
  - Total: 6.5 km^{2} (2.5 sq mi)
  - Rank: Ranked 11th

Population (2021)
  - Total: 1,818
  - Density: 280/km^{2} (720/sq mi)
- Time zone: GMT
  - Summer (DST): UTC+01
- Postcode district: JE3
- Postcode sector: 3

St Mary (Jèrriais: Sainte Mathie) is one of the twelve parishes of Jersey, Channel Islands. It is 7.7 kilometres (4.8 mi) north-west of St Helier. (Note: Measured from the Church to the Royal Square) It is the smallest parish by surface area, with an area of 3,604 vergées (6.5 km^{2}). The parish is rural, with a low population of only 1,818 in 2021, with a single sparse village. It borders four other parishes: St Ouen, St John, St Peter and St Lawrence.

== History ==
The Jersey parish system has been in place for centuries. By Norman times, the parish boundaries were firmly fixed and remain largely unchanged since.

The parish and its eponymous church derive their name from a medieval monastery, probably destroyed during Viking raids some time between the 8th and 10th centuries. In 1042 Duke William gave "St Mary of the Burnt Monastery" to the abbey of Cerisy.

In 1180 Jersey was divided by the Normans into three ministeria for administrative purposes. St Mary was part of Crapoudoit. Crapoudoit likely refers to the stream running through St Peter's Valley.

== Governance ==
The parish is a first-level administrative division of the Bailiwick of Jersey, a British Crown dependency. The highest official in the parish is the Connétable of St. Mary. The incumbent office holder is David Johnson, who has held the office since 2022 (previously as the parish's Deputy since 2014). The parish administration is headquartered at the Parish Hall next to St Mary's School.

At present, the parish forms one electoral district for States Assembly elections and elects one Deputy, as well as eight Senators in an islandwide constituency. The current Deputy for St. Peter is Daivd Johnson. Under the proposed electoral reform, it will form part of the North West electoral district consisting of St Mary, St Ouen and St Peter, which will collectively elect 4 representatives alongside the parishes' Connétables.

The parish is divided into vingtaines for administrative purposes as follows:

- La Vingtaine du Sud
- La Vingtaine du Nord

The boundary between the vigntaines run from the parish boundary with St Ouen and along the north side of La Rue Mahier. The boundary then runs along the north side of some of the buildings north of La Verte Rue. It then runs in a direct line from the southern end of La Rue du Motier to the southern end of La Rue de la Grosse Épine directly to its junction with Rue d'Olive. From there it runs to the border with St John.

== Geography ==
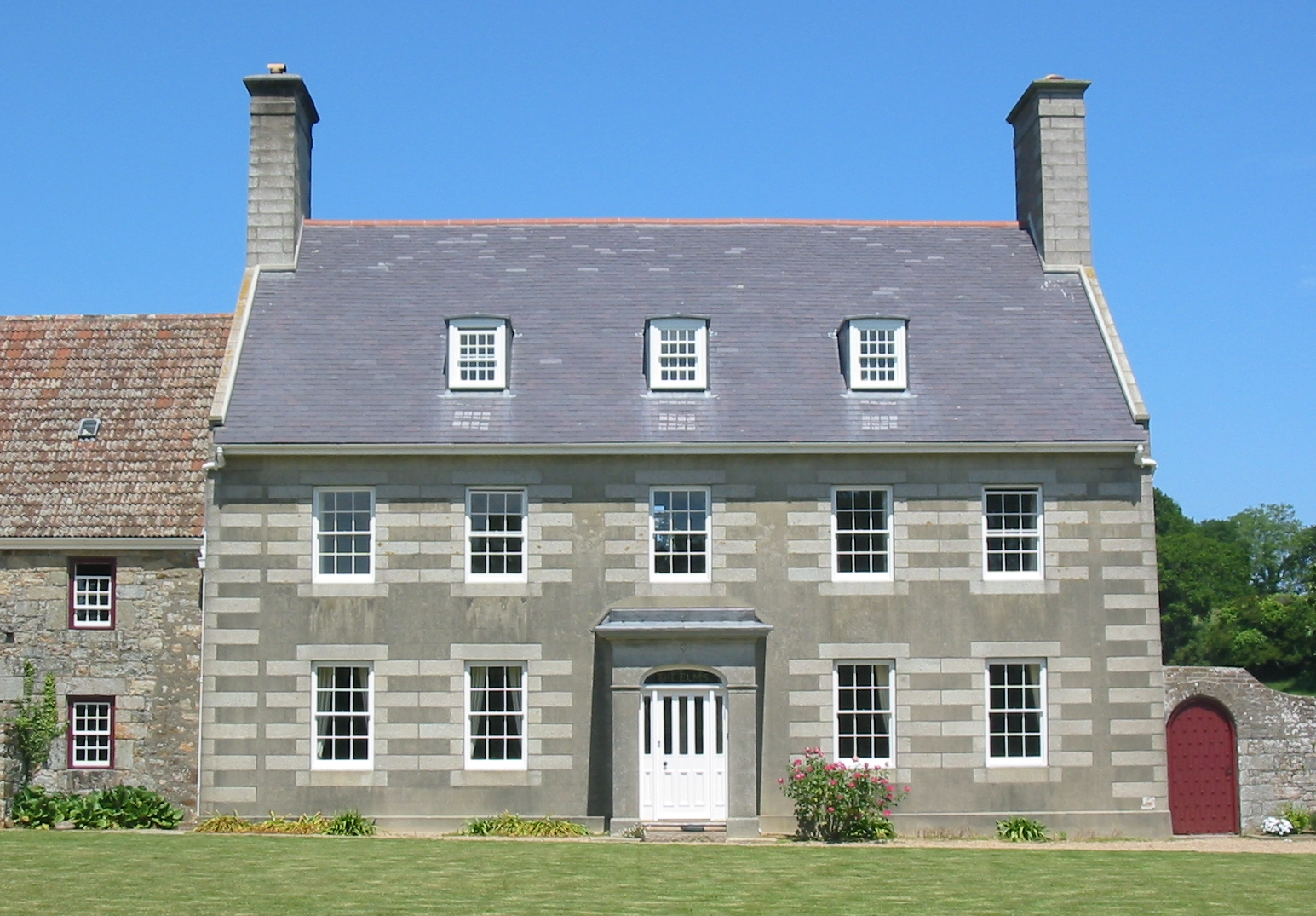
The Elms, constructed around 1740, is currently the headquarters of the National Trust for Jersey.

Mourier Valley runs down the boundary between St Mary and St John. The stream formerly powered a number of mills despite the scant population of the area.

La Grève de Lecq is the main bay in the parish and lies on the border with St Ouen. It can be accessed from the village down a valley known as Le Mont de Ste Marie.

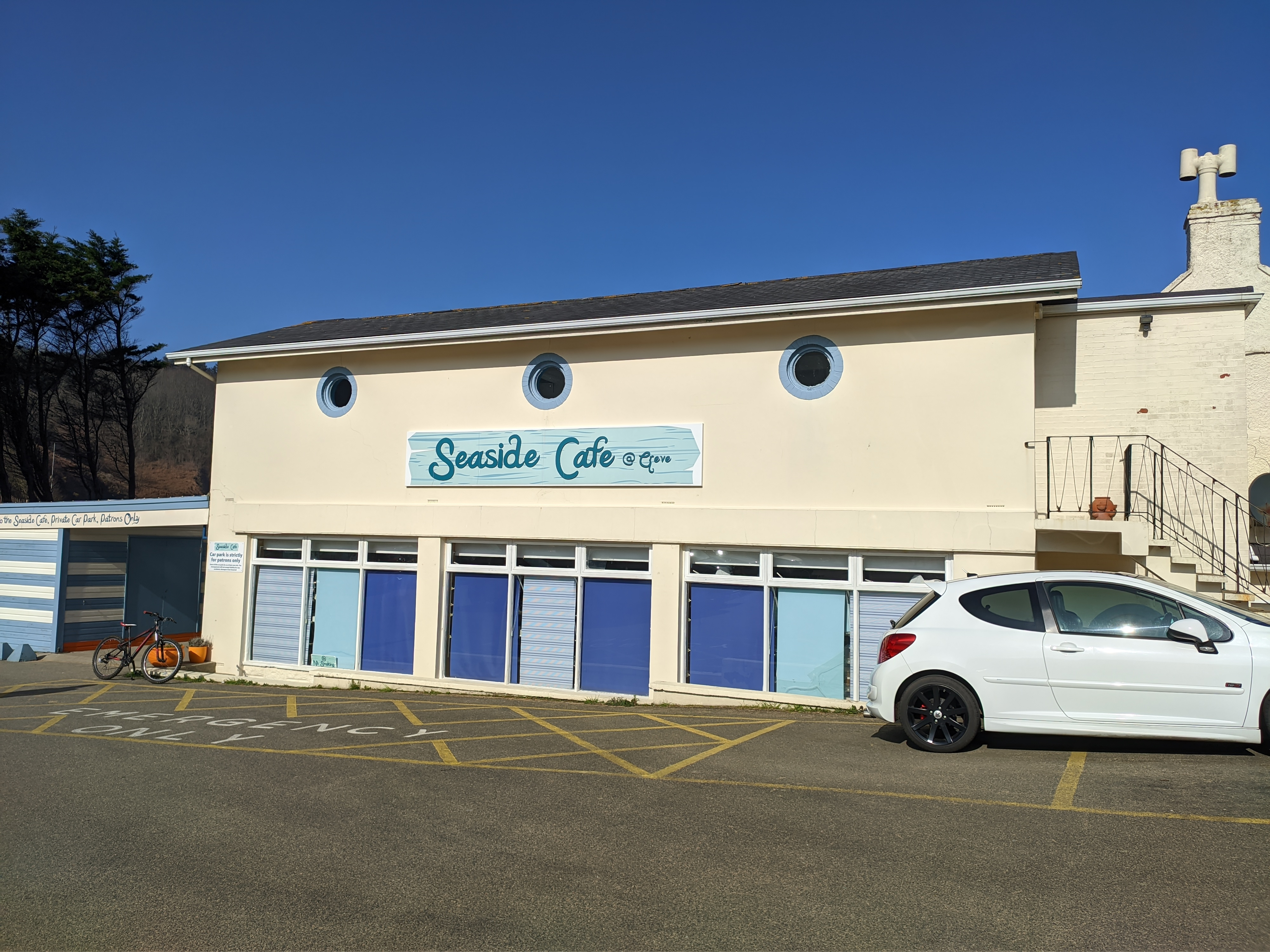
The Seaside Café at Grève de Lecq

The parish stands upon coarse-grained granite, 'of St Mary's type', which formed during the lower Palaeozoic period. This granite was formerly quarried for building.

=== St Mary's Village ===
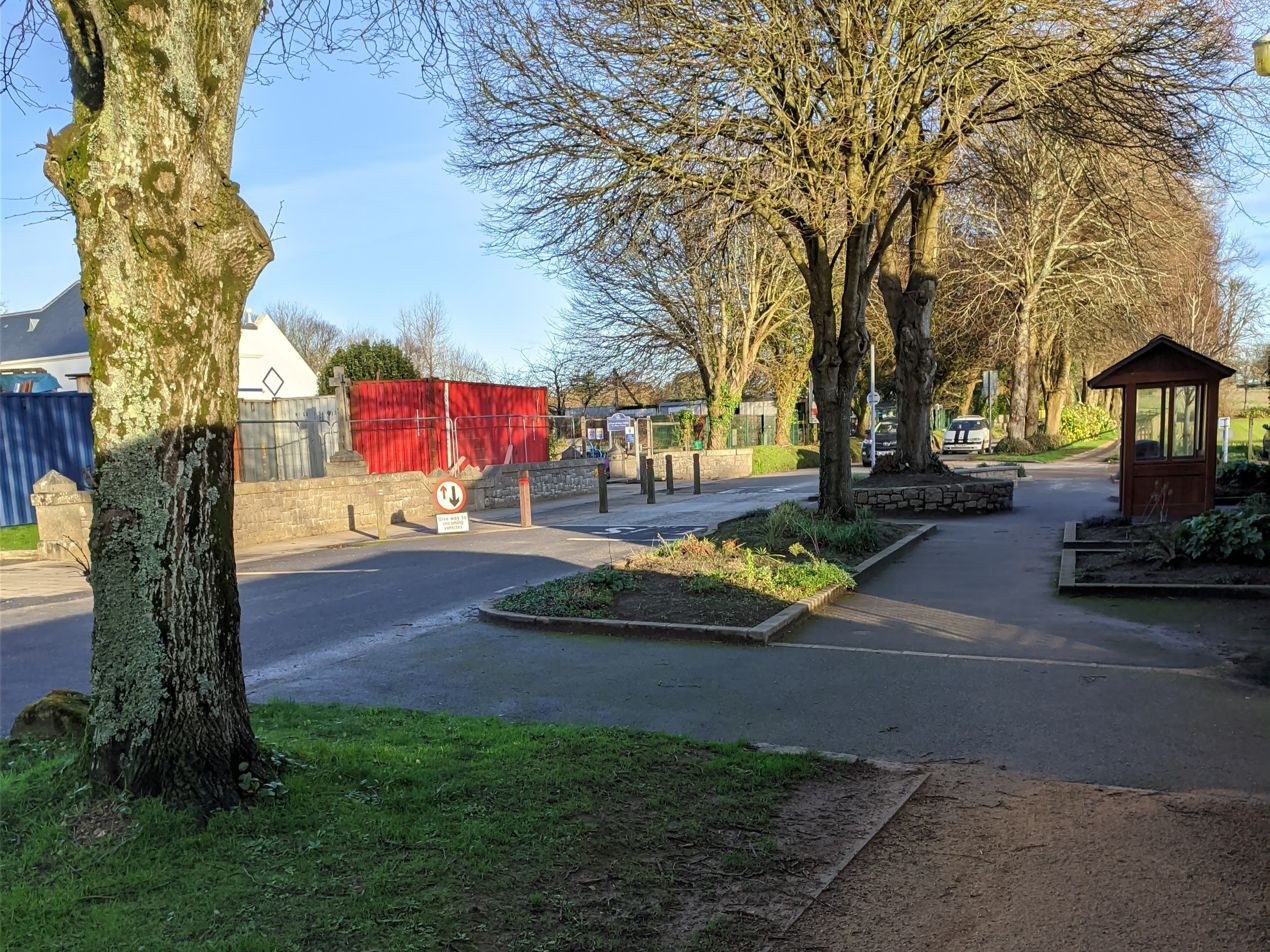
The traffic calming scheme outside St Mary's school

St Mary's Village is the main settlement in the village. It is formed around a box of sorts of main roads with link roads in between. The village's amenities are formed roughly in three clumps: the parish hall, rec centre and primary school; the parish church, cemetery and pub; and the petrol station. There is also a Methodist church.

The village has a blanket 20 mph speed limit, introduced in 2015. Previously, there had been a 30 mph limit on the southern main road and a 20 mph on the northern main road. The village has extensive traffic calming, including raised junctions, filtered permeability, virtual footpaths and build-outs. The village won the Chartered Institution of Highways and Transportation award for traffic calming measures introduced in the parish in the 2010s.

== Demography ==
St. Mary has the smallest population of all the parishes in Jersey, having only 1,818 residents in 2021.

Historical population
Year	Pop.	±%
1991	1,449	—
1996	1,475	+1.8%
2001	1,591	+7.9%
2011	1,752	+10.1%
2021	1,818	+3.8%

== Religious sites ==
The parish church is known as Sainte Marie cinq cloches (St Mary of the five steeples), due to the church's steeple being ornamented with five smaller spires. During the Calvinist regime in Jersey there were no Christmas services, but the custom arose of ringing the bell at Christmas for 24 hours to celebrate the end of the French occupation. For several years after the Restoration, to the dismay of the church Rectors, the bell-ringing prevented the holding of any service. Several Rectors attempted to block the bell-ringing to hold a Christmas service, including taking the bell-ringers to court in 1788; however, the Jurats found against the Rector. In 1858, a new Rector placed new locks on the church doors, removed the bell rope and clapper and took away the ladder to the belfry. However, parishioners quickly badly reacted. They broke the locks, deposited the doors in the Rectory gardens, awoke the blacksmith to forge a new clapper and one galloped into town to fetch a new rope. This firmly established the custom.

== Landmarks ==
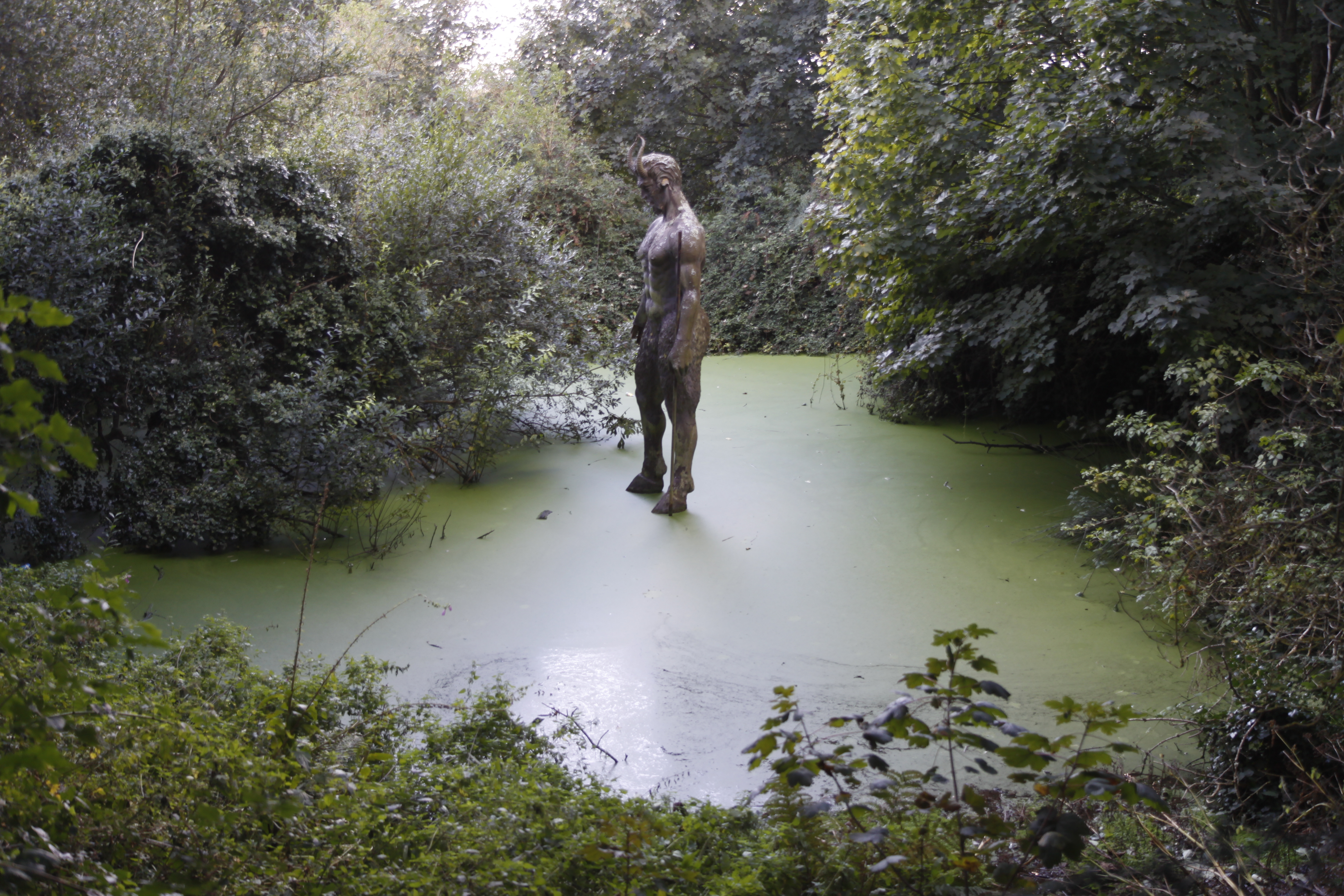
Close to Devil's Hole, in a little tree covered pond, is the figure of the Devil.

Among the natural attractions of the parish is a feature known as the Devil's Hole (French: Lé Creux du Vis), a blowhole in the cliffs of the coast. The descent from the car park to the Devil's Hole is a popular tourist attraction, with the walk taking approximately ten minutes. The upper part of the path is surfaced, and the lower part, once quite dangerous in parts, now has wooden steps and handrails, with much of the access having been improved by a working party from the Royal Engineers Corps of the British Army. In Victorian times it was possible to descend into the hole itself at low tide, but this is no longer possible. However, the access path ends at a large specially constructed viewing platform. The origin of the name is disputed. Creux refers to a chasm within a cliff-face. It is possible that du Vis was corrupted into an anglicised 'Devil'. It may also get its named from the statue of the devil, as it is unknown whether that predates the modern name. Following a shipwreck in 1851, when the ship's figurehead washed up in the Devil's Hole, a statue of a devil adapted from the figurehead was set up above the Hole. This wooden statue was replaced by a succession of modern versions in the 20th century.

Grève de Lecq is shared with St Ouen. Grève is the Jèrriais word for beach. Lecq originates from the Norse La Wik, which may have meant 'ship-loading creek' or referred to witches, should the bay have been a centre of sorcery. On the east side of Grève de Lecq in the parish lies Le Câtel de Lecq, a mediaeval earthwork. In the bay Le Moulin de Lecq, an old watermill, was converted into a residence in 1929 and following the Second World War became a pub, while retaining the wheel and remnants of the gears.

Crabbé is a creek and hinterland to the east of Grève de Lecq. Crabbé is the Jèrriais word for a narrow creek, as Crabbé is a creek containing a triple cave. Crabbé is the location for pistol shooting. Off the north coast near Crabbé lies l'Île Agois, a small islet. It likely takes its name from the Goes family. In the past, sheep would be taken over a plank laid across the gap between the island and the islet to graze. It belongs now to the National Trust. Excavation undertaken in 1974 showed it was a 7th- or 8th century monastery. Some 3rd century Roman coins were also found.

== Twinned towns ==
St Mary is twinned with Longues-sur-Mer, a commune of the département of Calvados, in the Normandy région of France.

== See also ==
- Historic Jersey, W.S. Ashworth, Jersey 1993 (no ISBN)
