= Vingtaine du Nord (St Mary) =

Vingtaine in Saint Mary, Jersey

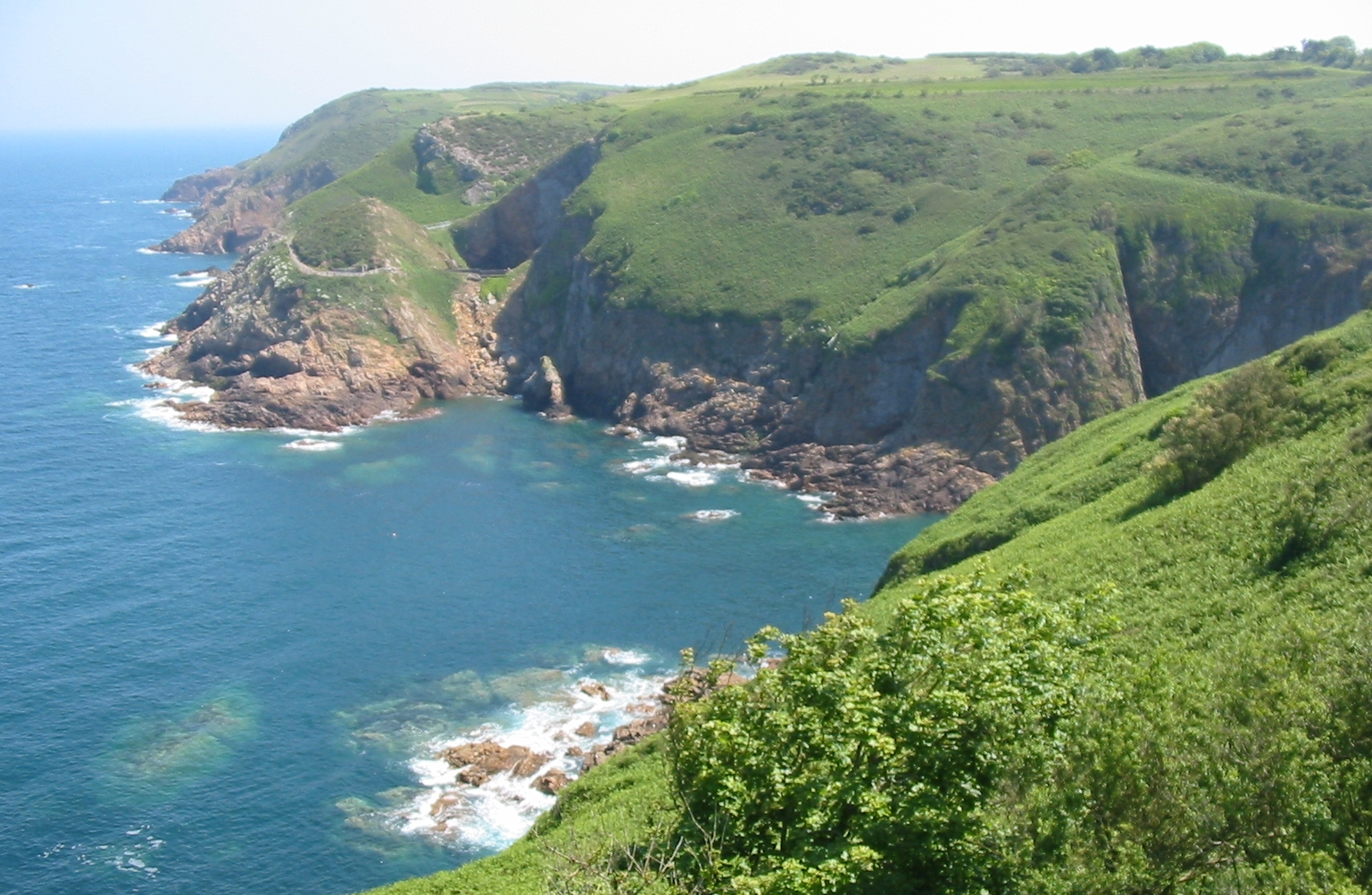
The Devil's Hole is a feature of the coast of the Vingtaine du Nord

The Vingtaine du Nord (La Vîngtaine du Nord in Jèrriais) is one of the two vingtaines of the parish of St. Mary in Jersey in the Channel Islands.
