= Jèrriais literature =

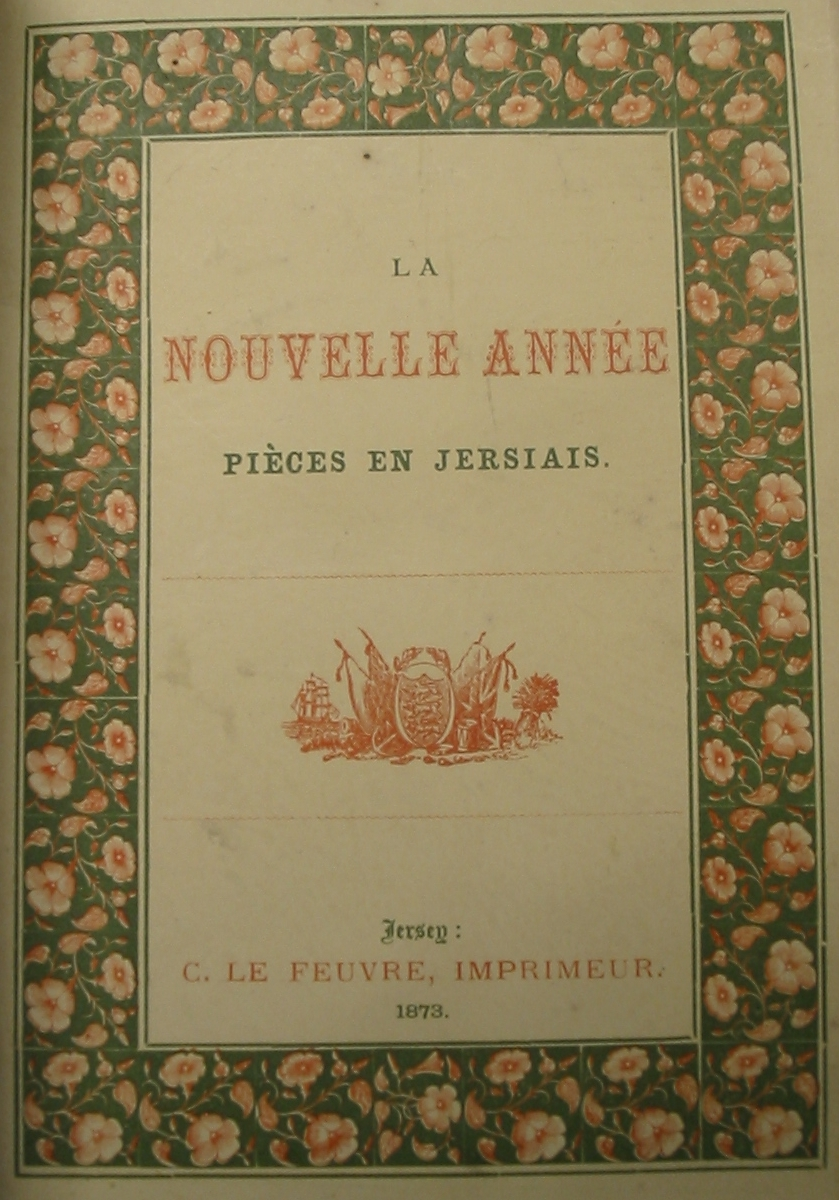
There being no novels in Jèrriais, literary production has mostly been published in newspapers, almanacs and pamphlets such as La Nouvelle Année

Jèrriais literature is literature in Jèrriais, the Norman dialect of Jersey in the Channel Islands.

The literary tradition in Jersey is traced back to Wace, the 12th century Jersey-born poet, although there is little surviving literature in Jèrriais dating to before the introduction of the first printing press in Jersey in the 1780s. The first printed Jèrriais appears in the first newspapers at the end of the 18th century, and the earliest identified dated example of printed poetry is a fragment by Matchi L’Gé (Matthew Le Geyt 1777–1849) dated 1795.

== 19th century ==
An astonishing boom in competing newspapers and journals throughout the 19th century provided a platform for poets and writers to publish regularly in the feuilletons - typically, satirical comment on the week's news, elections, politicians and notables. Annual almanacs (up until 1958) reprinted favourite poems and stories that had appeared throughout the year, or specially composed pieces.

The copious Dgèrnésiais poetry published in Guernsey by George Métivier (nicknamed the "Guernsey Burns") from around 1818 inspired similar literary activity in Jersey. The international interest in Robert Burns's Scots poetry provided the background to a conscious effort by Channel Island writers to promote vernacular literature.

Matthew Le Geyt (1777–1849) was the first poet to publish in Jèrriais following the introduction of printing. The earliest dated piece of his writing comes from 1795. He was from St Helier but he must have lived in Trinity as well where he was a Vingtenier. It is suggested that Le Geyt was influenced by the Norman language purin literature of Rouen.

Satirical playlets were published in newspapers in the 19th century. Élection de St. Martin, a playlet in Jèrriais and French published in the newspaper Le Constitutionnel on 24 November 1838, was probably never staged, but rather read in company. Henri Luce Manuel's play in rhyming couplets Queur de Femme (in modern spelling: Tchoeu d'Femme - "heart of a woman") of 1861 was published in pamphlet form.

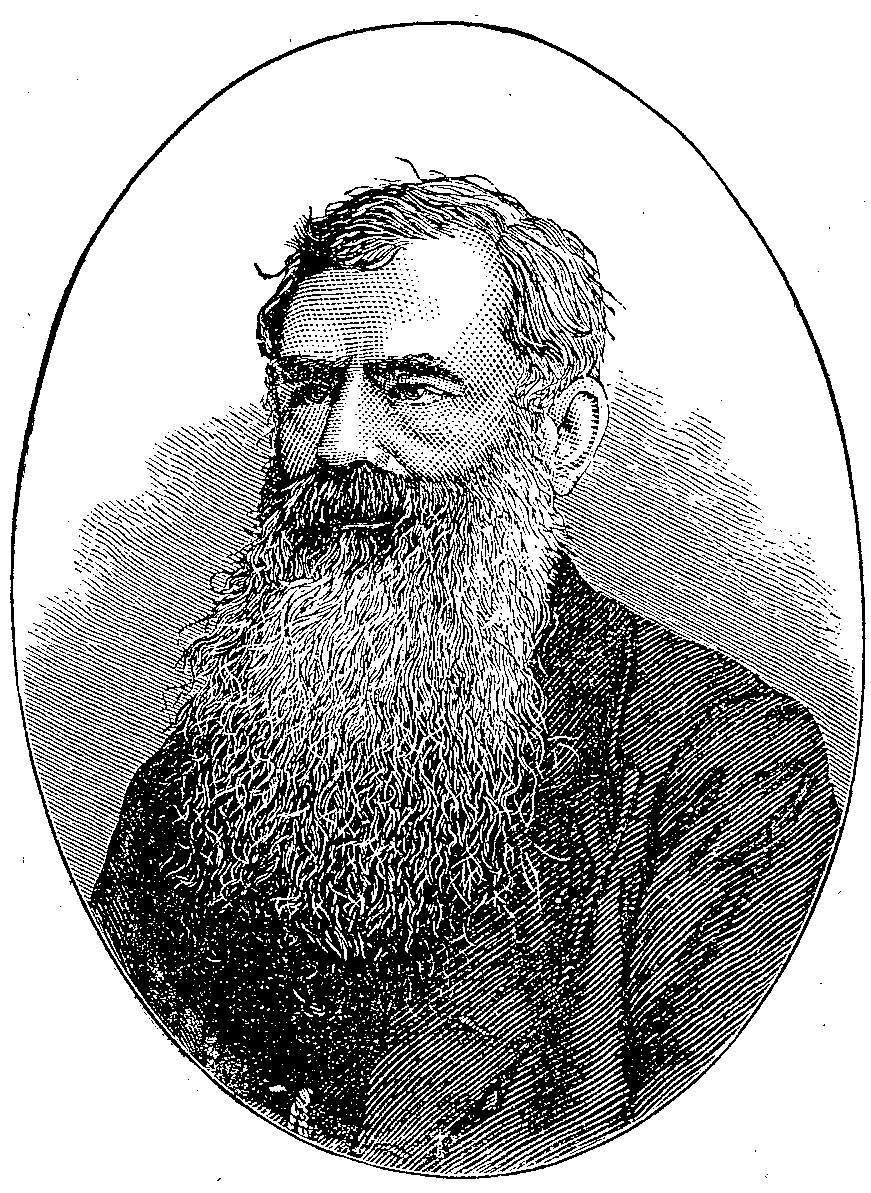
Laelius - Sir Robert Pipon Marett

The first printed anthology of Jèrriais poetry, Rimes Jersiaises, was published in 1865 by Abraham Mourant. It collected works by Matthew Le Geyt, "Laelius" (Sir Robert Pipon Marett 1820 - 1884, Bailiff of Jersey 1880 - 1884), "L." (Henri Luce Manuel), Esther Le Hardy, and "L'Anmîn Flip" (Philippe Asplet). Some Dgèrnésiais is also included in the form of mutual tributes in verse between Laelius and George Métivier. This anthology enjoyed great popularity in continental Normandy. It included dramatic duologues, which may have been performed at traditional veil'yes (social neighbourhood gatherings) or read as closet dramas.

Sir Robert Pipon Marett's prestige and influence also helped to reinforce the movement towards standardisation of the writing system based on French orthography, a trend which was also helped by the nascent Norman literary revival in the neighbouring Cotentin area of mainland Normandy where writers, inspired by the example of the Norman writers of Jersey and Guernsey, began their own production of literary works.

François-Victor Hugo reproduced an extract from Laelius's "La Fille Malade" in his "La Normandie inconnue", which spread awareness of Jèrriais literature far beyond Jersey but which overstated Laelius's literary influence in Jersey since Sir Robert Pipon Marett's literary production dwindled as he took on high office. Laelius is the most quoted poet from this period and the most popular in mainland Normandy, most probably because of his familiarity with and fidelity to French classical models, as well as the fact that his writing is generally less satirical than his contemporaries and therefore requires less knowledge of Jersey institutions, events and personalities.

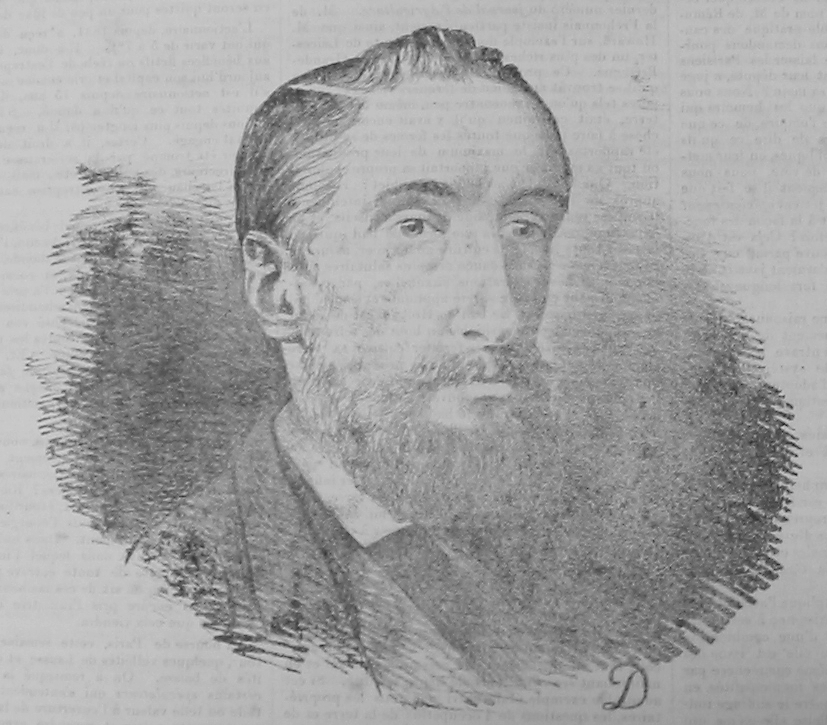
A.A.L.G. - Augustus Asplet Le Gros

Other influential writers include "A.A.L.G." (Augustus Asplet Le Gros 1840 - 1877) and "St.-Luorenchais" (Philippe Langlois 1817 - 1884).

Le Gros was among the first generation to be educated at Victoria College, the school founded by the States of Jersey on the model of English public schools. Although he trained for the law, he became a farmer by profession, and moved into politics, being elected Constable of St. Peter and eventually Jurat. He was a founder of the Société Jersiaise. He wrote poetry in English, two volumes of which were published in London in 1863 and 1868, but was most devoted to poetry in Jèrriais. He edited an annual literary anthology called "La Nouvelle Année", dedicated to the Norman literature of Jersey and Guernsey, between 1868 and 1875.

Philippe Langlois came from a St. Lawrence family, hence his pen name. He studied medicine in Paris and Dublin, qualifying as a doctor. He served as Deputy in the States of Jersey and on 27 June 1876 he was elected Jurat. He was president of La Société Jersiaise, and started work on a dictionary of Jèrriais - in the Glossaire du Patois Jersiais published by the Société in 1924 and based partly on Langlois' lexicographic foundations, his poem Lé Jèrriais was reprinted (from La Nouvelle Année of 1875) as a frontispiece. This poem describes features of the various dialects of the language around the Island.

Philippe Asplet (1818–1893) wrote under the name of Flip or L'Anmin Flippe. He was a Trinity man, although he was born in St. Martin and died in Grouville. His spelling shows the typical z instead of th that was typical of the now-disappeared Faldouet dialect. He was a Centenier and often wrote verses on parish elections. His work appeared in the satirical newspaper La Voix des Îles, frequently as captions to caricatures. He was a supporter of Victor Hugo and the French proscrits, and attacked the decision to force Hugo to leave Jersey. The Lieutenant-Governor tried to force Asplet to resign as Centenier because of his links with the proscrits, but L'Anmin Flippe refused and made public the correspondence. He spent a number of years in Paris and was clearly influenced by French poetry.

Jean Sullivan (or John Sullivan, 1813–1899) wrote under the pen-names Oméga or J.S. and is the only author known to have claimed to write in the now-disappeared St. Helier dialect, although his spelling is so idiosyncratic that it is difficult to identify which features might be typical of that dialect and which represented his personal fancies. Victor Hugo described him as "un vrai Poëte" (a true poet), although his highly coloured style full of classical allusions and antiquarianism mean that his popularity is restricted nowadays. He was a devoted monarchist, writing many poems on royal subjects, and in 1884 received permission from Buckingham Palace to translate Queen Victoria's More leaves from the Highlands into Jèrriais. This project, like many others announced by Sullivan, remained unpublished or unfinished.

Esther Le Hardy's three-act play in rhyming couplets L'Enchorchelai, ou les très Paires (in modern spelling: L'Enchorchélé, ou les Trais Paithes - "The Bewitched, or the Three Pears") was published in 1880.

== Into the 20th century ==
The de Faye sisters, Mathilda (born 1846, who wrote under the pen name Georgie) and Alice (1849–1925, who wrote under the pen name Livonia), wrote mostly about the social scene, with an interest in fashion, novelties and social events.

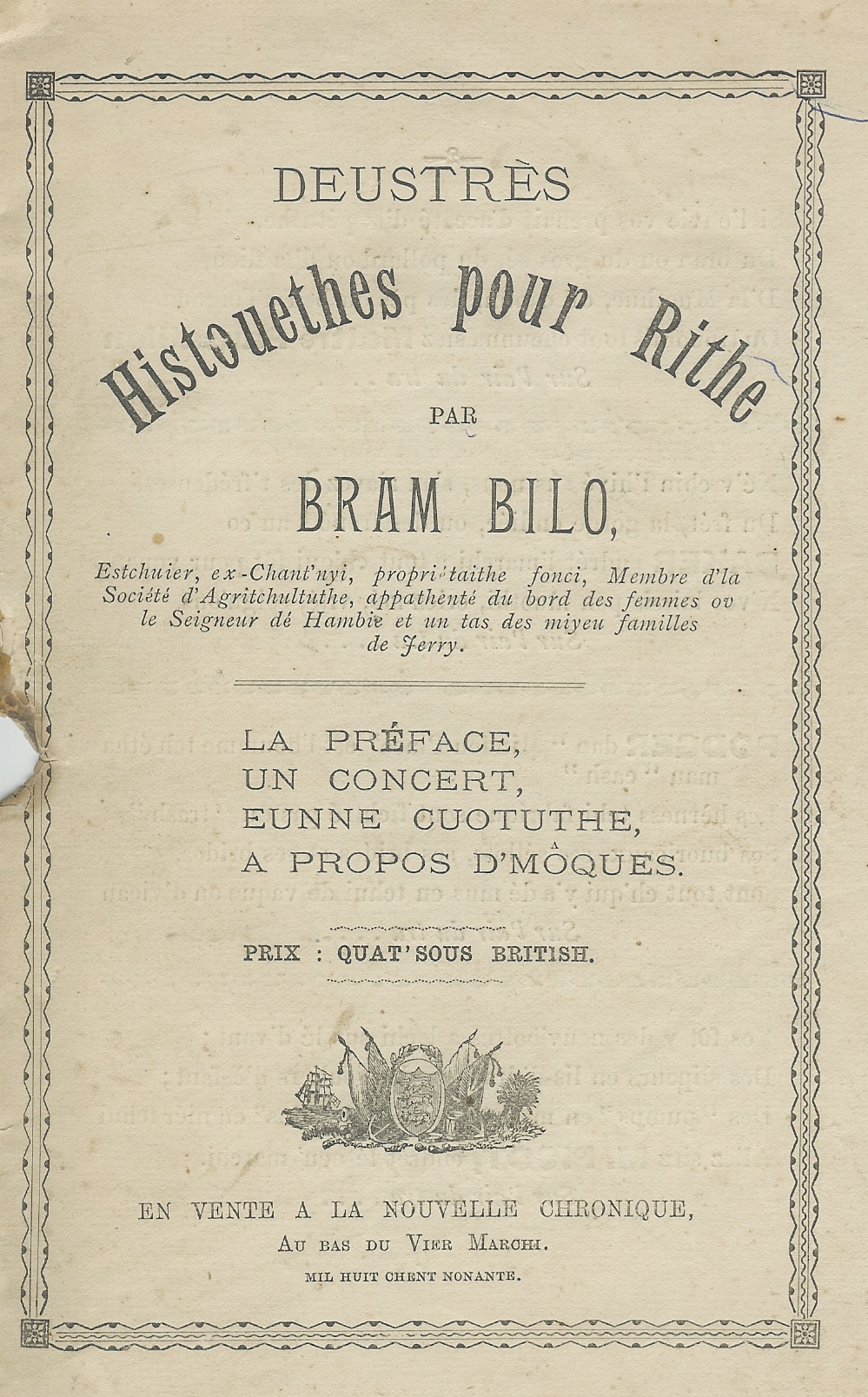
Some of Philippe Le Sueur Mourant's more popular stories were republished in booklet form after their first appearance in newspapers.

Philippe Le Sueur Mourant (1848–1918) wrote under several pseudonyms. His first great success was with the character Bram Bilo, a self-important but naïve countryside notable. Having eventually killed off his best-known character, in 1911 he launched, under the name of Piteur Pain, a new series of articles in newspapers relating the adventures and opinions of the Pain family, newly moved to Saint Helier and its anglicized society and fashionable entertainments. The Bram Bilo stories remained more popular, being reprinted a number of times since. They were also translated into Dgèrnésiais by Thomas Grut in the 1920s and published in La Gazette de Guernesey. It has also been suggested that the Bram Bilo stories influenced the writing of the Orne writer, Octave Maillot.

Two volumes entitled Patois Poems of the Channel Islands were published (from 1883) by John Linwood Pitts in Guernsey. They included poems by A.A. Le Gros, Laelius, Philippe Asplet, Philippe Langlois, and Henri Luce Manuel – all with parallel English verse translations.

Jean Picot (1846–1922) was born in St. Helier but of an old Trinity family. A farmer by profession, when an injury forced him into retirement he took up literature. He wrote under the pen name of J.P., especially for La Nouvelle Chronique de Jersey and its Almanac. He often undertook translations from English, notably versions of poems by Robert Service, and of Mrs. Caudle's Curtain Lectures genre pieces by Douglas Jerrold, originally published in Punch in the 1840s which may have later influenced Edward Le Brocq's Ph'lippe et Merrienne stories. His verses are metrical rather than syllabic.

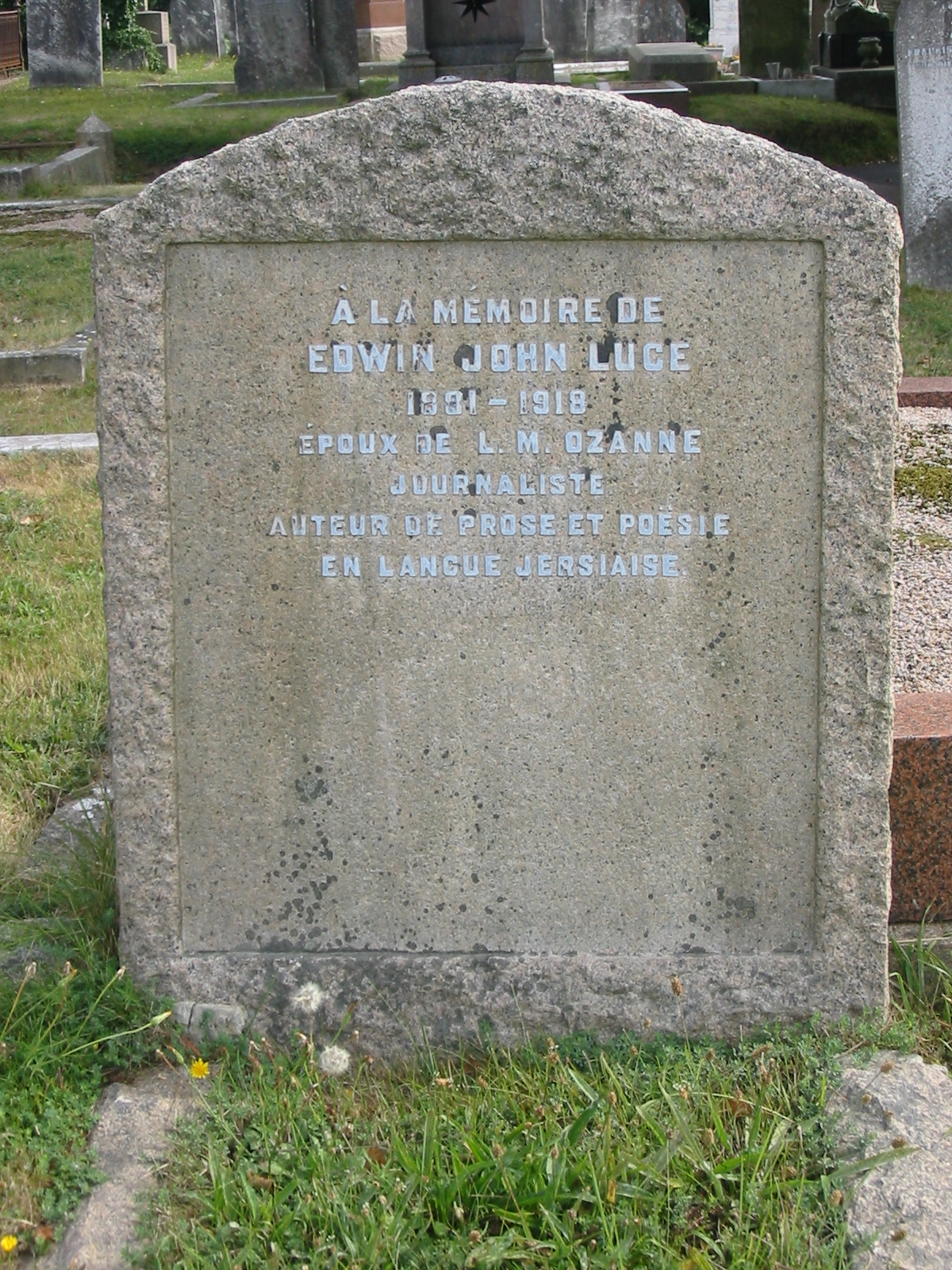
E.J. Luce's gravestone in St. Helier's Almorah cemetery describes him in French as "auteur de prose et poësie en langue jersiaise" ("author of prose and poetry in the Jersey language")

Elie (Edwin J. Luce 1881–1918) was editor of the French language newspaper La Nouvelle Chronique de Jersey and a poet who wrote topical poems for the newspaper. He was also active in promoting the development of drama in Jèrriais and organised performances, ultimately leading to the establishment of a Jèrriais section of the Jersey Eisteddfod in 1912. Unfortunately for the language, he died at a young age in the influenza pandemic of 1918. His brother, Philip W. Luce (1882–1966), also a journalist and poet (pen name Ph'lippe d'la Golarde), emigrated to Canada, but sent occasional writings back to Jersey.

Caouain (George W. De Carteret 1869 - 1940) maintained a weekly newspaper column purporting to be the work of an owl (cahouain) who flew from parish hall to parish hall to report on the latest election news and local gossip. The domestic ructions of the owl and his wife, Marie Hibou, also provided a humorous commentary on social attitudes. G.W. De Carteret also wrote recitations in verse and playlets for the annual Eisteddfod competitions.

Besides Edmund Blampied's work in the visual arts, he also amused himself and his friends by writing poetry in Jèrriais, signing himself as Un Tout-à-travèrs. He wrote nonsense verse for children. In 1933, La Chronique de Jersey considered publishing a booklet of Blampied poems illustrated by the artist himself, but the plans came to nothing.

== Since 1940 ==
During the Occupation (1940–1945), little original writing was permitted to be published by the German military censorship. However very many older pieces of literature were re-published in the newspapers as an act of cultural self-assertion and morale-boosting. Some literature circulated clandestinely, such as Edmund Blampied's words for an insulting anti-Hitler song entitled La chanson Hitleur written in 1944. The inability of the Germans to understand Jèrriais enabled the performance of dramas that would otherwise not have passed the censor. A Jèrriais play performed at a parish hall was "as patriotic as could possibly be" but the Germans who attended the production did not understand it.

After the Occupation and with the re-establishment of a free press, the re-opened English language newspaper, The Morning News, under the editorship of Edward Le Brocq (1877–1964) revived the weekly column in 1946 with a letter from Ph'lip et Merrienne, supposedly a traditional old couple from St. Ouen who would comment on the latest news or recall time past. On the final closure of the Morning News in 1949, the letters transferred to the last remaining French language newspaper in Jersey, Les Chroniques de Jersey until its closure in turn in 1959 when they transferred to the Evening Post until the author's death in 1964.

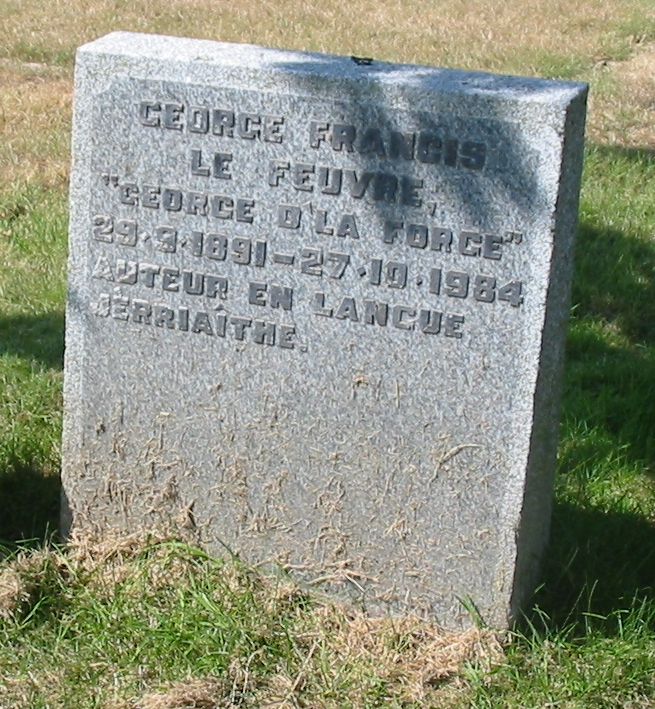
Gravestone of George d'la Forge in churchyard of St. Ouen. Inscription reads George Francis Le Feuvre, "George d'la Forge", 29.9.1891 - 27.10.1984, Auteur en langue Jèrriaîthe (Author in the Jersey language)

The most influential writer of Jèrriais in the 20th century was a U.S. citizen, George Francis Le Feuvre (1891–1984) whose pen-name was "George d’la Forge". He emigrated to North America after the First World War but for almost forty years maintained a flow of articles in Jèrriais back to Jersey for publication in newspapers, first in Les Chroniques de Jersey (1946–1954) and later in the Evening Post (subsequently Jersey Evening Post ) (1964–1984). Selections of his articles have been published in book form as Jèrri Jadis and Histouaithes et Gens d'Jèrri.

Frank Le Maistre (1910–2002) (known as Dr. Fraînque Le Maistre, although his doctorate was honorary), compiler of the dictionary, maintained a literary output starting in the 1930s with newspaper articles under the pseudonym Marie la Pie, poems, magazine articles, research into toponymy and etymology. He himself considered his masterpiece the translation of the Rubaiyat of Omar Khayyam that he undertook during the German Occupation.

The foundation of L'Assembliée d'Jèrriais, a body to preserve and promote the language, in 1952 led to the publication of a quarterly journal, Lé Bulletîn d'Quart d'An, providing a literary outlet for Jèrriais which became even more important after the closure of Les Chroniques de Jersey in 1959. The editor was Frank Le Maistre.

Lé Bulletîn d'Quart d'An ceased publication in 1977, having notched up a quarter-century, and was replaced by Les Chroniques du Don Balleine (1979–1987) which in turn gave way to the current Les Nouvelles Chroniques du Don Balleine (winner of the Prix Littéraire du Cotentin in 1993).

Following the death of George d'la Forge, Sir Arthur de la Mare (1914–1994), a retired ambassador, took over the task of contributing regular columns to the newspaper. Written in the Trinity dialect, as distinct from the St. Ouen dialect used by George d'la Forge and Frank Le Maistre which is laid out in the standard grammar of Jèrriais and the standard dictionaries, Sir Arthur's articles included reminiscences of his life as a diplomat, especially in Japan, Thailand and Singapore, as well as comments on events and politics in Jersey. Sir Arthur's mix of foreign tales and domestic farming comments continued the pattern set by George d'la Forge who alternated between reminiscences of his youth in Jersey, his life in North America and travels round the world, and commentary on news sent from Jersey. Since Sir Arthur's death, a roster of contributors have maintained the tradition of the weekly newspaper column.

== See also ==
- Culture of Jersey
- Les Pages Jèrriaises
- List of Norman-language writers
- Literature in the other languages of Britain
