= Amélia Perchard =

British writer, playwright and poet

Amélia Louisa Perchard (28 December 1921 – 19 July 2012) was a writer, playwright, and poet in the Bailiwick of Jersey. She is known for her work written in Jèrriais, the traditional language of the island, and her activism in support of Jèrriais cultural heritage.

== Biography ==
Amélia Perchard was born Amélia Noël in 1921, in Saint-Martin, Jersey.

A writer, she produced various stories, plays, and poems in the Jèrriais language over the course of her career. Her plays are considered an important part of Jersey's theatrical heritage, and they have been performed frequently at the Jersey Eisteddfod festival. She also wrote recitations to be read by children during events organized by the Jèrriais association L'Assembliée d'Jèrriais. Her work poignantly and dramatically recounts the history of her island, in particular the dark years during the German occupation, which she denounces in her writings. Alongside George F. Le Feuvre, she was one of the most prolific post-World War II Jèrriais-language writers.

Perchard was also active in writing Jèrriais-language song lyrics, which were set to music and recorded, as well as performed by musicians at Norman festivals in Jersey and in Normandy. Her musical work frequently incorporated adaptations of popular and traditional songs, including translations from English.

She died in 2012 at age 90.
