= Le Geyt =

Le Geyt is a surname. Notable people with the surname include:

- Alice Le Geyt (1839–1934), British writer, suffragist and temperance campaigner
- Matthew Le Geyt (1777–1849), Jersey poet

== See also ==
- Ellis Le Geyt Troughton (1938–1974), Australian zoologist
- Charles LeGeyt Fortescue (1876–1936), Canadian electrical engineer
