= Channel Island Snooker Championship =

Snooker match

Tournament information
- Country: Jersey / Guernsey
- Organisation(s): World Snooker
- Format: Single match
- Current champion: Gary Britton

The Channel Island Snooker Championship (also known as the Channel Island Snooker Final) is a two-player snooker match held almost every April between the current island snooker champion of Jersey and the current island snooker champion of Guernsey. The trophy was originally sponsored by the main newspapers of the respective islands, the Guernsey Evening Press and the Jersey Evening Post. The match takes place in each island in alternate years and consists of the best of 7 frames. Gary Britton is the defending champion, representing Jersey is the current champion, having defeated Adam Shorto in the 2019 final.

== List of Channel Island Champions ==
Below is a list of previous champions. The match takes place in Jersey during even-numbered years and in Guernsey during odd-numbered years.

Date	Winner	Island
1932	A. Mantle	Guernsey
1933	A. Zabiela	Guernsey
1934	G. L. Borny	Jersey
1935	G. L. Borny	Jersey
1936	I. J. Soudain	Jersey
1937	H. I. Allen	Guernsey
1938	L. Richmond	Jersey
1939	B. C. O'Neill	Jersey
1940	J. J. Spillane	Guernsey
1941-1945	No competition	No competition
1946	F. T. Drouin	Jersey
1947	D. P. Dorleans	Jersey
1948	L. Richmond	Jersey
1949	G. L. Borny	Jersey
1950	N. E. Wale	Guernsey
1951	N. E. Wale	Guernsey
1952	L. Richmond	Jersey
1953	N. E. Wale	Guernsey
1954	G. Le Blancq	Jersey
1955	N. E. Wale	Guernsey
1956	N. E. Wale	Guernsey
1957	R. Querree	Jersey
1958	D. P. Dorleans	Jersey
1959	N. E. Wale	Guernsey
1960	G. Le Blancq	Jersey
1961	N. E. Wale	Guernsey
1962	N. E. Wale	Guernsey
1963	B. T. Kimber	Guernsey
1964	D. Poingdestre	Jersey
1965	R. Newton	Jersey
1966	G. Le Blancq	Jersey
1967	R. Newton	Jersey
1968	D. Poingdestre	Jersey
1969	R. Brooker	Jersey
1970	R. Brooker	Jersey
1971	B. T. Kimber	Guernsey
1972	O. Le Breton	Jersey
1973	D. Naidoo	Jersey
1974	K. Hawthorn	Jersey
1975	K. Hawthorn	Jersey
1976	K. Hawthorn	Jersey
1977	R. Brooker	Jersey
1978	R. Newton	Jersey
1979	D. Maguire	Jersey
1980	G. Le Blancq	Jersey
1981	D. Naidoo	Jersey
1982	M. Bees	Jersey
1983	D. Naidoo	Jersey
1984	P. Warr	Guernsey
1985	D. Le Fevre	Guernsey
1986	D. Lewis	Guernsey
1987	C. Fulton	Jersey
1988	D. Maguire	Jersey
1989	D. Maguire	Jersey
1990	A. Lihou	Guernsey
1991	D. Brabiner	Jersey
1992	A. Trustum	Guernsey
1993	K. Beadle	Jersey
1994	K. Beadle	Jersey
1995	K. Beadle	Jersey
1996	K. Le Fevre	Jersey
1997	G. Britton	Jersey
1998	K. Le Fevre	Jersey
1999	K. Le Fevre	Jersey
2000	Gary Britton	Jersey
2001	Gary Britton	Jersey
2002	J. Browne	Jersey
2003	M. Desperques	Guernsey
2004	A. Holley	Guernsey
2005	M. Desperques	Guernsey
2006	A. Shorto	Guernsey
2007	M. Desperques	Guernsey
2008	Aaron Canavan	Jersey
2009	M. Desperques	Guernsey
2010	Aaron Canavan	Jersey
2011	Aaron Canavan	Jersey
2012	Aaron Canavan	Jersey
2013	Aaron Canavan	Jersey
2014	Aaron Canavan	Jersey
2015	A. Shorto	Guernsey
2016	Aaron Canavan	Jersey
2017	Aaron Canavan	Jersey
2018	M. Desperques	Guernsey
2019	Gary Britton	Jersey
