= Philippe Langlois =

Jersey writer (1817–1884)

Philippe Langlois (French pronunciation: [filip lɑ̃ɡlwa]) in Norman language: Ph'lippe Langliais (22 September 1817 – 19 June 1884) was a Norman language writer in Jèrriais. He wrote under the pen name of "Un Luorenchais, as well as "P.L.".

La Fille Amouoreuse by Philippe Langlois, with parallel English translation

Langliais came from an old family of St Lawrence in Jersey. He studied in Caen and Paris and qualified in medicine in Dublin where he was received into the Royal College of Surgeons. A scholar and scientist, he was also Deputy of St Lawrence, Jurat of the Royal Court (elected 27 June 1876) and major and medical officer in the Royal Jersey Militia.

As president of La Société Jersiaise, Langliais collaborated on the beginnings of the Glossaire du Patois Jersiais with his colleague Augustus Asplet Le Gros.

Langliais was a prolific poet : each of his published poems corresponds to perhaps two left in manuscript, in French and in English.

His best known and best written pieces in Jerriais are in Lé Vièr Temps and Lé Jèrriais.
