= Robert Pipon Marett =

Jersey journalist (1820–1884)

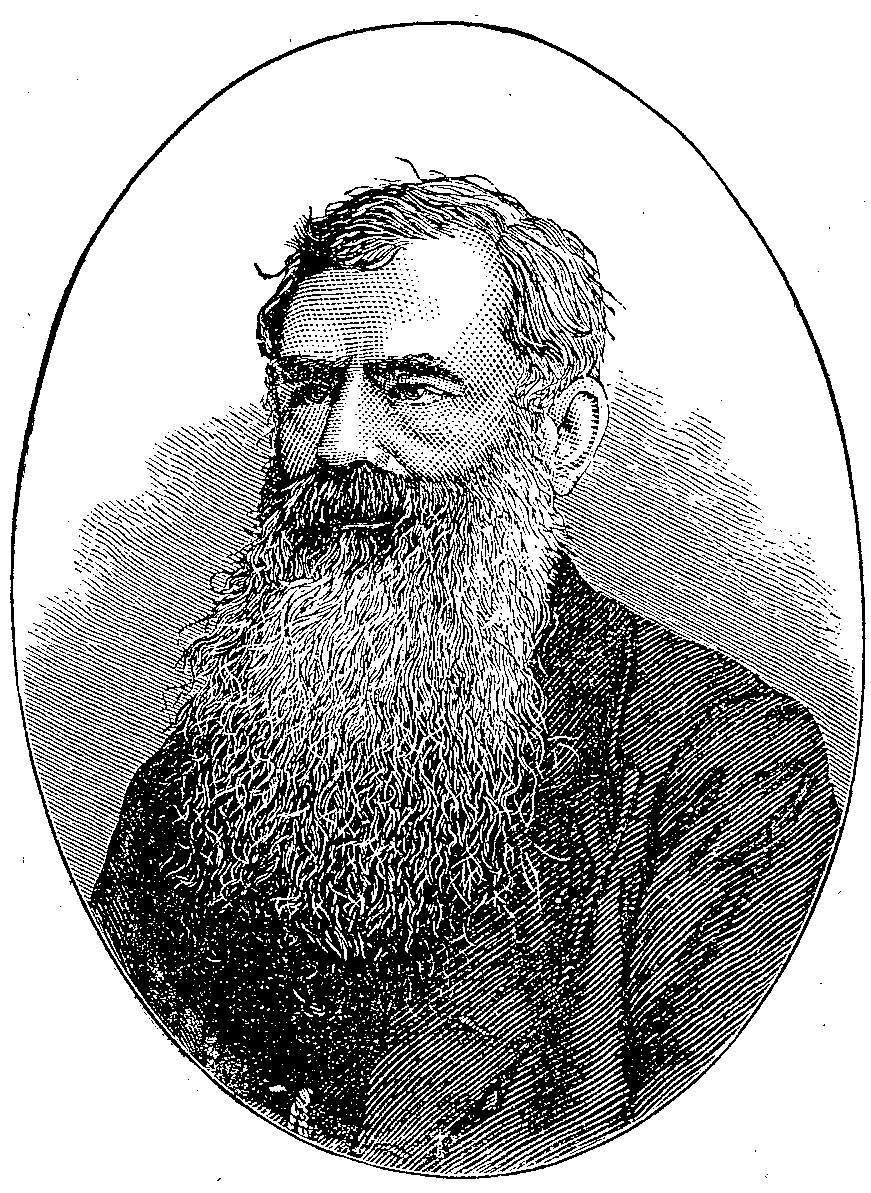
Sir Robert Pipon Marett

Sir Robert Pipon Marett (20 November 1820 – 10 November 1884, pseudonym Laelius) was a lawyer, journalist, poet, politician, and Bailiff of Jersey from 1880 until his death.

== Life and career ==
He was born in St. Peter on 20 November 1820 and studied at the University of Caen and the Sorbonne. He was admitted to the Bar of Jersey as advocate in 1845, but in 1846 the family moved to Blois in France as a result of his mother's ill health. Returning to Jersey, he entered the political scene and was elected Constable of St. Helier in 1856. During his short term in municipal office, he laid out the Parade as an urban promenade.

The death of the Bailiff, Sir Thomas Le Breton, created a vacancy among the Crown Officers and on 6 March 1858 Robert Pipon Marett was appointed Solicitor-General. He rose through the legal hierarchy, becoming Attorney-General in 1866, and Bailiff in 1880.

He was knighted in 1880. He was one of the founders of the Société Jersiaise and a patron of education for girls. He was the father of Robert Ranulph Marett and Julia Marett (President Société Jersiaise 1938 - 1942).

He died on the 10 November 1884 at his home, La Haule Manor in St. Brelade, after a long illness.

== Literature ==
On his return from Blois, Robert Pipon Marett was one of the founders of the newspaper La Patrie in which his poetry in Jèrriais appeared from 1849 under the pseudonym Laelius.

His La Fille Malade was widely admired and François-Victor Hugo reproduced it in his La Normandie inconnue. It has been suggested that his Lé R'tou du Terre-Neuvi oprès san prumi viage influenced Victor Hugo's Les Pauvres gens written in Jersey in 1854. He corresponded publicly in verse form with George Métivier, the Guernsey poet. His comparatively small poetic output belies its continuing influence. His poetry is generally social rather than political, but La Bouonne Femme et ses Cotillons satirises conservative resistance to constitutional reform.

He took a philological interest in Jèrriais and through his prestige did much to standardise Jèrriais orthography on the pattern of French orthography. On being appointed to high office he stopped publishing poetry, and a fire at his home, Blanc Pignon, in St. Brelade in 1874 destroyed his papers – a loss to Jèrriais literature.

Le Vier Garçon
A poem (first two verses only) Le Vier Garçon ("The Bachelor") by Laelius, first published in La Patrie 17 November 1849

== Note ==
1. Des Filles, une sorcière, Dame Toumasse et quelques autres R.-J. Lebarbenchon, 1980, Azeville
