= Guernsey Press =

Daily newspaper in Guernsey

The Guernsey Press
- Type: Daily newspaper
- Format: Compact
- Owner: The Channel Islands Media Group Limited
- Editor: James Falla
- Founded: 1897; 129 years ago (as Guernsey Evening Press, renamed Guernsey Evening Press and Star in 1951)
- Language: English
- Headquarters: Braye Road, Vale, Guernsey
- Country: Guernsey
- Circulation: 15,165 (as of 2011)
- OCLC number: 751644419
- Website: guernseypress.com

The Guernsey Press and Star, more commonly known as the Guernsey Press, is the only daily newspaper published in Guernsey.

== History ==
The Guernsey Evening Press was first published in 1897. In 1951 it purchased the struggling Guernsey Star (first published in 1813), renaming itself Guernsey Evening Press and Star. The paper was published by The Guernsey Press Company until 1999 when the company merged with Guiton, publishers of the Jersey Evening Post. In 2004 Guiton came under the ownership of the Claverlely Group, which also owns the Wolverhampton Express and Star and the Shropshire Star. On 1 October 2019 it was announced that The Channel Islands Media Group Limited, a local investment company, had purchased the Guernsey Press Company and its wholly owned subsidiary, Guernsey Distribution Limited.

== Publication and circulation ==
The paper is currently published six days a week and has a circulation of 15,165 (average for December 2010 – June 2011).

== German occupation ==
During the German occupation of Guernsey, the two papers, subject to censorship from the German authorities, continued to publish, eventually on alternate days, given the shortage of materials and staff available. After the Germans temporarily removed the editor of The Star, Bill Taylor, from his position, following an article which they deemed offensive, it was edited by Frank Falla. Falla was a key member of the Guernsey 'Resistance', being involved in the Guernsey Underground News Sheet (which went by the acronym GUNS). GUNS published BBC news, illegally received, on a single news sheet. According to his memoirs, through strategic placement of stories handed to him by the German authorities in The Star, he allowed islanders to distinguish easily between German news and stories emanating from Guernsey journalists. Falla was eventually betrayed by an Irish collaborator and, along with his peers who helped to produce GUNS, was deported to Germany. Falla survived, though other members of the organisation did not return from Germany.

The paper was a pro-German propaganda piece during the Second World War.

== See also ==
- Jersey Evening Post
