= Geraint Jennings =

Jersey member of Municipality of St Helier and linguist (born 1966)

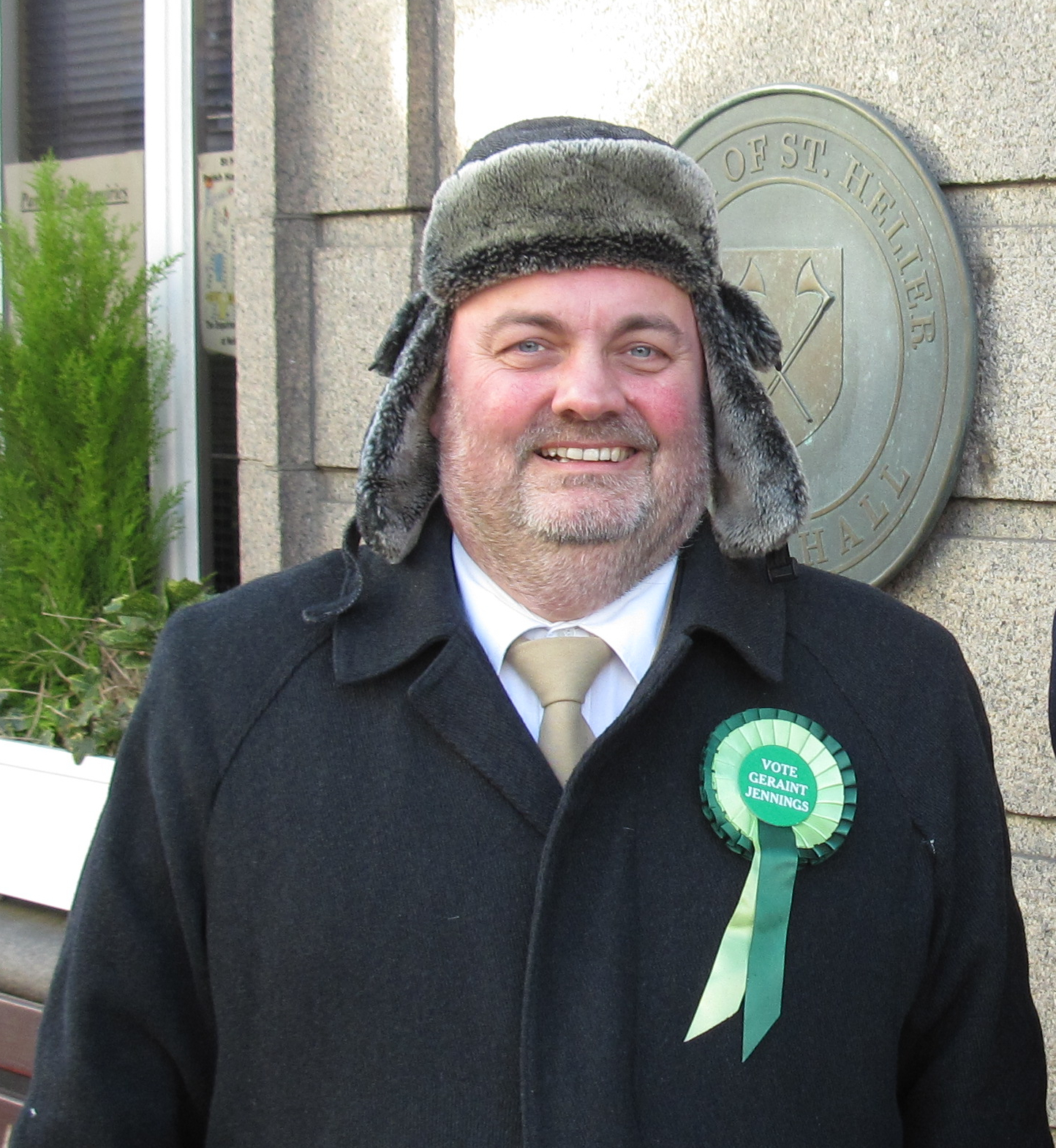

Municipality of St Helier, Jersey
- Incumbent
- Assumed office Dec 1996
- Constituency: St Helier, Jersey
- Majority: Unopposed

Personal details
- Born: 13 May 1966 (age 60) St Helier, Jersey
- Party: Jersey Green Party

Geraint Jennings (born 13 May 1966) is a Jersey, UK member of Municipality of St Helier and linguist.

== Biography ==
Jennings was born in Saint Helier, Jersey. He was educated at Victoria College Preparatory and Christ's Hospital. He graduated from University College, Oxford with a Master of Arts in Modern Languages. Further studies include a Licenciate Diploma in TESOL from Trinity College, London. He is fluent in Russian. His interests include art and illustration. He is the procureur du bien public for the parish of St Helier.

== Jèrriais ==
He is a teacher of Jèrriais and strongly active in the Société Jersiaise, which is a group dedicated to maintaining Jersey's language, history and culture.

He created Les Pages Jèrriaises, and currently maintains them. He is the resident Jèrriais reporter for the Jersey Evening Post and Parish Matters.

In 2007, he won first place "for the best short story in Norman" at the Fête Nouormande in Bricquebec for his story entitled "La frontchièthe". He won first place again in 2008 for his story entitled "Feu et feunmée".

He has worked on the translation of Lewis Carroll's story Alice's Adventures in Wonderland, which was published in 2012, as L'Travèrs Du Mitheux Et Chein Qu'Alice Y Dêmuchit.

== Politics ==
Jennings became politically active as a member of the Jersey Green Party. After it disbanded he acted as an independent.

== Parish municipality ==
He was elected to the Municipality of the Parish of St Helier in 1996 as a member of the Roads Committee and was re-elected in 1999, 2002 and 2005. In his role he masterminded the parish cycling strategy.

== Candidacy for Jersey elections ==
Jennings has stood for election in the States of Jersey on seven occasions, but not elected:

Date	Election	District	Party	Votes
1992	Election for Deputy	Trinity		
October 1993	Senatorial election	(Island-wide)	Green Party	2,793
November 1993	By-election for Deputy	St Helier district 3&4		
November 1996	Election for Deputy	St Helier district 3&4		568
February 1999	Senatorial by-election	(Island-wide)		440
October 2002	Senatorial election	(Island-wide)		4,667
November 2002	Election for Deputy	St Helier district 3&4		486
