= Alice Le Geyt =

British temperance activist, novelist, suffragist (1839–1934)

Alice Bell Le Geyt (1839–1934) was a British writer, suffragist and temperance campaigner.

Le Geyt was born on Jersey in 1839. Her parents were Charles William Le Geyt and Emma Bell, and her grandfather was the Scottish surgeon Charles Bell.

On 4 August 1864, holidaying at Lyme Regis, she rowed through surf "at the risk of her life" to rescue two young boys who had fallen into the sea from the pier. She was awarded the Royal National Lifeboat Institution's silver medal for gallantry for this action.

Le Geyt published a single three-volume novel, Which will triumph?, in 1867. It concerns two young men, Henry and Herbert, who are rivals for the heart of a young woman, Alice, and has been described as "a tale of love, rivalry, and the struggle for personal fulfillment in a world that is changing rapidly".

In 1871, Le Geyt became secretary of the newly-formed Bath committee of the Bristol and West Society of the National Society for Women's Suffrage.

When Anna Kingsford became editor of the Lady's Own Paper for a few weeks in 1872, the first article to be published was by Le Geyt with the title "Coffee-Houses or Gin-Palaces". She wrote that she hoped to open a coffee-house herself, to "counter the evils of strong drink", and invited donations to support this, to be sent to her at her home: The Cottage, Corston, near Bristol. In October 1872, she opened a "model beerless public house", in Corston, called the Golden Coffee Pot. It was reported in Chicago's Religio-Philosophical Journal in 1879 that "it has been successfull [sic] in substituting coffee for beer among the poor, and upon Miss Le Geyt's recent departure from the place, many leading citizens presented her with a silver inkstand, in token of her efforts among them.

== Selected publications ==
- Le Geyt, A. B. (1867). Which will triumph?. London: T. C. Newby. (Reprinted in 2007 by Kessinger publishing, ISBN 9780548317679) Full text of volumes 1 and 3 available online
