= George F. Le Feuvre =

Jersey writer

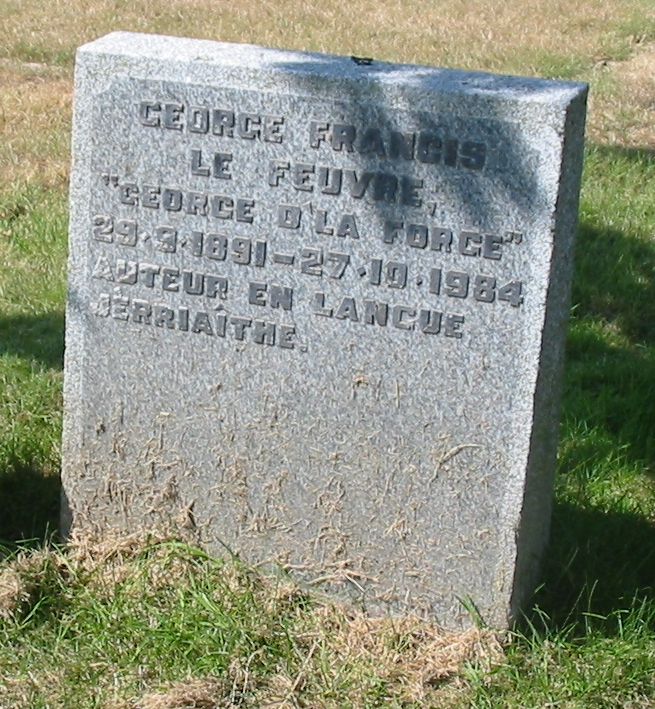
George F. Le Feuvre's gravestone. Inscription reads George Francis Le Feuvre, "George d'la Forge", 29.9.1891 - 27.10.1984, Auteur en langue Jèrriaîthe.

George Francis Le Feuvre, who wrote under the pen-names of George d'La Forge and Bouanhomme George, was a Jèrriais prose author born at La Forge, Millais, Saint Ouen, Jersey, on 29 September 1891 and died in San Antonio, Texas, on 27 October 1984.

== Life ==
He took his pen-name from the family forge where his father, also called George Le Feuvre, carried on his trade as blacksmith and with his wife, Florence Giffard brought up their family. George attended Mabel Mauger's dame school in Saint Ouen from the age of 6. It was there that he first started learning English and French. He moved on to St Ouen's Wesleyan School. The Le Feuvre family was separated in 1901 when George senior, Florence, and their two younger sons, Sidney and John, emigrated to Jersey's cod-fishing settlements at the Gaspé coast in Canada. George junior was left behind with his brother Frank and their grandparents, so that, should the ship be lost during the ocean crossing at least two boys would be left as survivors. In 1903, his grandfather died and the forge was sold. George went to live with his godparents in Saint Brelade, and attended La Moye School. George left school at age 14 to go to work in the offices of solicitor William Binet in Saint Helier. He continued working in the legal environment and was appointed Commis Vicomte for the Police and Petty Debts Court in 1914.

As a young man, he took part in amateur dramatic productions, including works by E. J. Luce.

He served as secretary to the Connétable of Saint Peter, and served in the North-West Battalion of the Royal Militia 1908–1915. In 1916 he enlisted in the Royal Field Artillery and saw action on the Western Front of the First World War. Although he devoted many pieces of writing to his proud memories of peacetime military service in the Militia, in contrast he avoided describing, except in passing, his experiences in the First World War in the battles of the Somme, Vimy Ridge, Messines Ridge and Cambrai.

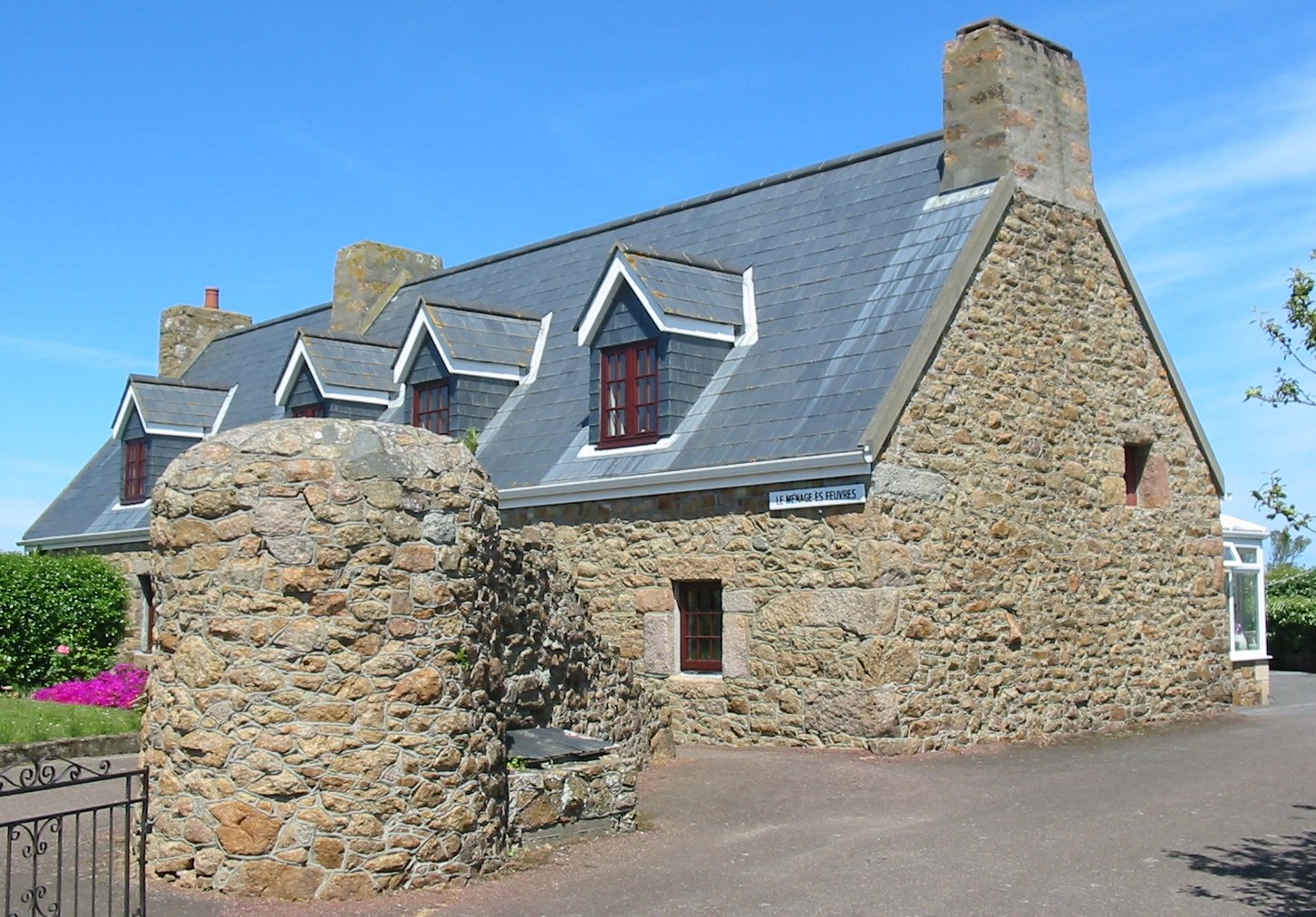
Le Ménage ès Feuvres, Saint Ouen, Jersey - former home of George F. Le Feuvre

In 1916 he married Marguerite Adrienne Jeanne Marie Forgeard, stepdaughter of a French army captain. They had one daughter, Reine, born in 1917. Marguerite died during the influenza pandemic, in March 1919. George never remarried, and remained a single man for the rest of his life.

=== Canada ===
Demobilised in 1919, and having no family ties remaining in Jersey, he decided to join the rest of his family in Canada. He had met his three brothers during the war, when he, Frank (who had signed up for the British Army) and his two other brothers (who had enlisted in Canada) were briefly reunited. The brothers had sworn to meet up again if they survived the war, and George had heard about their life in Canada and the brothers and sisters he had never seen who had been born there. He later explained to his readers that although he loved Jersey so much, the experience of meeting his brothers on the battlefield had inspired him to rejoin his family. Unable to find a civil service post in Quebec, George joined the civil service in Ottawa.

=== Detroit ===
In 1922, in search of new opportunities, he moved to Detroit in the United States where he joined the Ford Motor Company, first as a nightwatchman. He worked his way up the administration at the Great Lakes Engineering Works. During the course of his employment he learned to fly.

In 1933 he was naturalised as a United States citizen. In 1936 he was appointed purchasing director for Ford's sites in Michigan and Ohio. After the end of the war, at the age of 55, he decided to take retirement in 1946 and travel.

=== Jersey, Canada, USA ===
Revisiting Jersey in 1946, he was offered the post of editor of the last French language newspaper in Jersey, Les Chroniques de Jersey. Wishing to be free of commitments that would tie him down, he turned down the offer, but agreed to provide a weekly column in Jèrriais from wherever he happened to be.

In subsequent decades, George established a pattern of spending part of the year in North America and the rest staying with friends in Jersey and indulging his love of travel. He eventually acquired a house in Jersey, Le Ménage ès Feuvres, that used to belong to his family until sold after the death of his great-uncle Charles. He undertook a renovation of the property and moved in during 1965. He continued to divide his time between Jersey and North America - Ottawa and Michigan to visit his brothers, Fort Lauderdale in Florida where he maintained a home, and San Antonio, Texas, home to his granddaughter.

The occasion of his 90th birthday in 1981 was marked with a dinner given in his honour by Le Don Balleine, and a celebratory mass in the chapel of Saint Ouen's Manor. The Jersey Evening Post celebrated the 900th column published in that newspaper in 1982. On 22 March 1984 he was elected a Membre d'Honneur of La Société Jersiaise. He died in a nursing home in San Antonio on 27 October 1984.

== Works ==
For almost forty years he maintained a flow of articles in Jèrriais back to Jersey for publication in newspapers, first in Les Chroniques de Jersey (1946–1954) and later in the Evening Post (subsequently Jersey Evening Post ) (1964–1984). Selections of his articles were published in book form as Jèrri Jadis (1973) and Histouaithes et Gens d'Jèrri (1976).

His first column for Les Chroniques de Jersey was published on 23 November 1946. Articles appeared weekly, or nearly weekly, until the end of 1951. In 1952-1954 articles relating George's travels appeared sporadically. A final article in Les Chroniques de Jersey, an appreciation of the newspaper, appeared in its final issue on 30 December 1959.

In 1953 George became the first secretary of L'Assembliée d'Jèrriais, founded to promote the Jersey language. Between 1952 and 1977 he was a regular contributor to its quarterly magazine Lé Bulletîn d'Quart d'An.

On the death in 1964 of writer Edward Le Brocq, whose weekly column in Jèrriais had transferred from Les Chroniques de Jersey on its closure at the end of 1959 to the Evening Post, George took up the rôle of providing a weekly column.

The publication of Jèrri Jadis resulted in the award of the Prix Littéraire du Cotentin to George in 1974.

On 13 January 1981, the Jersey Evening Post celebrated the 800th article by George published in that newspaper: "Eight hundred articles, each of about 800 words and delivered regularly from wherever he happens to be (which is usually America, where he has lived for many years) is a remarkable achievement." And when the milestone of the 900th article appeared (on 5 August 1983), the Jersey Evening Post described him as "Jersey heritage's most remarkable guardian".

From 14 April 1982, George's articles in Jèrriais were accompanied in the Jersey Evening Post by a parallel translation into English. His last article was published on 26 October 1984.
