= Les Pages Jèrriaises =

Les Pages Jèrriaises (English: The Jèrriais Pages) is a collection of thousands of pages in and about Jèrriais posted on the internet. It was created and is maintained by Geraint Jennings. It is the largest collection of Norman materials on the internet. It has also been praised in Normandy as an example of how a Norman dialect has managed to modernise itself. Les Pages Jèrriaises have also featured prominently in a national newspaper.

Les Pages Jèrriaises are divided into sections containing vocabulary (usually with English, and sometimes French, translation), grammar, authors, poems, songs, texts, and articles, information on Jersey and its parishes, a FAQ, an introduction to Jèrriais, and quizzes and games, all in Jèrriais. It contains a repository of old Jèrriais texts (such as poems, stories, and articles), published and made available to the general public.

Les Pages Jèrriaises are sometimes used as a supplement to Jèrriais teaching material in classrooms on Jersey, and is also used as a resource by Jèrriais learners abroad, as well as to connect Jèrriais speakers who have left the island. They have been used as a source for Jèrriais-related research by individuals outside of Jersey, including Tony Le Sauteur's pages on the history of Jèrriais in Quebec.

== History ==
Les Pages Jèrriaises, commissioned by La Société Jersiaise, were initially created by Geraint Jennings, and had achieved media notice by 1996. In 1999, a local contest was created to celebrate the addition of the 1,000th page.
