= Matthew Le Geyt =

Jersey poet

Matthew Le Geyt (Jèrriais: Matchi L’Gé; 1777–1849) was the first poet to publish in Jèrriais following the introduction of printing. The earliest dated piece of his writing comes from 1795. He was from St Helier but he must have lived in Trinity as well where he was a Vingtenier.
