= Jersey Evening Post =

Newspaper on the island of Jersey

- The current front page layout of the Jersey Evening Post
- Type: Daily newspaper
- Format: Compact (Tabloid)
- Owner: All Island Media
- Founder: H.P. Butterworth
- Editor: Carl Walker
- News editor: Michael Morris
- Founded: June 30, 1890
- Language: English, Jèrriais
- Headquarters: St Helier, Jersey
- Website: jerseyeveningpost.com

The Jersey Evening Post (JEP) is a local newspaper published six days a week in the Bailiwick of Jersey. It was printed in broadsheet format for 87 years, though it is now of compact (tabloid) size. Its strapline is: "At the heart of island life".

== History ==
=== 1890 to 1945 ===
The Evening Post was founded in 1890 by H.P. Butterworth, with the first issue published 30 June 1890. It was acquired only a few weeks after its launch by Walter Guiton, whose business printed it.

The Post was produced sheet by sheet on a flatbed press until 1926, when Guiton oversaw the introduction and operation of the first rotary press. Guiton remained the main proprietor and editor until the following year, when his son-in-law Arthur Harrison took over. The latter stayed in both positions until he was succeeded in 1944 by his son, Arthur G. Harrison. Under the Harrisons, the newspaper, while undergoing little technical change, saw testing times as the island came under German military occupation from 1940 to 1945. Although it was still published during these years, the Post was strictly supervised and censored by the occupying forces.

=== 1945 to 1972 ===
After the island's liberation in 1945, the newspaper grew and in 1957 became the main asset of a newly formed business entity called W E Guiton and Co Ltd.

Following the closure of the Morning News in 1949, the Evening Post has been without a regular English-language competitor, and the closure of the French-language newspaper Les Chroniques de Jersey at the end of 1959 left the Evening Post as the only newspaper of record in Jersey to publish the Jersey Gazette of official notices and promulgation of laws.

In 1967, the newspaper's name was changed from Evening Post to Jersey Evening Post.

=== 1973 to 2003 ===
Control of the paper passed in 1973 to Frank Walker, who would later become Jersey's first Chief Minister. The Guiton Group expanded outwards from newspaper production in the late 1970s into IT, through its subsidiary company Itex. In 1998, it purchased the Guernsey Evening Press and Star.

=== 2004 to 2021 ===
Subsequently, the Guiton Group was purchased in 2004 by the Claverley Group, publishers of the Express and Star.

On Christmas Eve 2008, the paper published a satirical cartoon which led to accusations of defamation by two local politicians and anti child-abuse campaigners, Trevor Pitman and Shona Pitman. The resulting libel action case was dismissed in court, in April 2012.

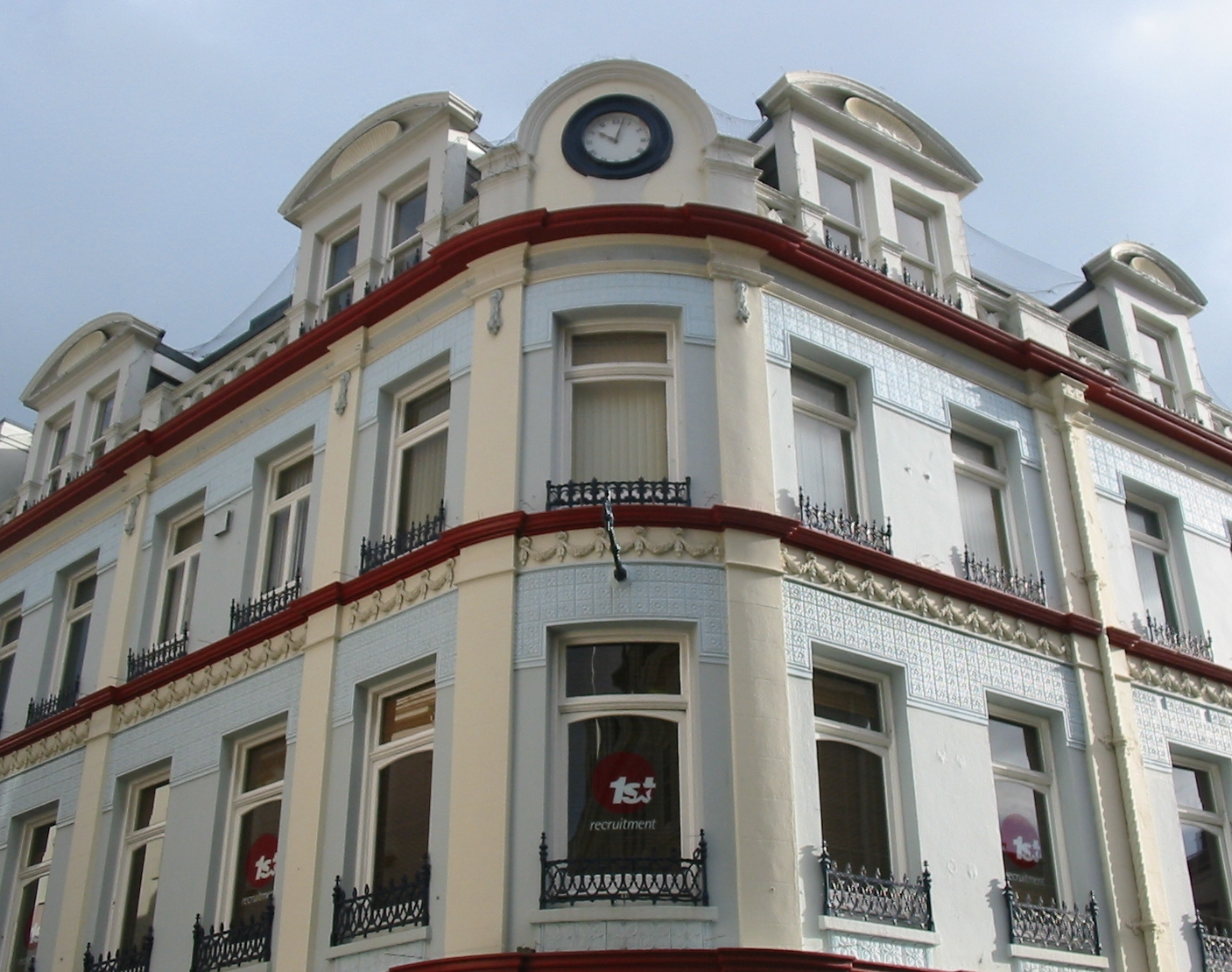
Until the newspaper moved to Saint Saviour in 1977, it was based in Saint Helier. The distinctive façade of the former offices at the corner of Charles Street and Bath Street pictured here is still recalled in the Under the Clock column of miscellany.

On June 30, 2015 the Jersey Evening Post celebrated its 125th birthday.

In January the JEP donated its photographic archive of 1.5 million images to the Island. The archive – a collection of glass plates, negatives and prints which record the richness and variety of Island life since the paper was founded in 1890 – has been conserved and digitized by Jersey Heritage so that they can be accessed and enjoyed by Islanders for ever. In March 2015 the JEP launched their 125th anniversary exhibition at the Jersey Museum entitled "Your Story, Our History: 125 Years Through a Jersey Evening Post Lens". It included more than 1,500,000 images and tells the Island's story through both world wars and beyond. In August 2015, JEP staff teamed up with the parish of St Saviour to work on their Battle of Flowers float. Celebrating the newspaper's special anniversary, Hot Off The Press, featured a printing press complete with moving cogs and rolls of paper, as well as a birthday cake and a huge newspaper.

It also launched the inaugural Pride of Jersey awards. The awards are split into 12 categories, each one of them celebrating the very essence of Jersey life. The winners were announced at a ceremony on 23 September 2015 at Aviation Beauport.

=== 2022 to present ===
In October 2022, the newspaper completed their merger with the Bailiwick Express. They then renamed their joint holding company from MH Ltd to All Island Media.

== Features ==
=== Jèrriais ===
From 14 March 1982 until 2007 the Jèrriais articles were accompanied by a parallel translation in English.

The Jèrriais - Jersey's native language column hosts articles written in Jersey's dialect of Norman, Jèrriais, accompanied by a précis and vocabulary in English.

In 1911 Philippe Le Sueur Mourant (1848–1918) launched a new series of stories in the Morning News relating the adventures and opinions of Piteur Pain, supposedly a former country blacksmith turned foreman of the printing shop, and his family. This series of stories moved to the Evening Post between 1915 and 1916.

Following the closure of Les Chroniques de Jersey, the Ph'lip et Merrienne articles started appearing in the Evening Post from 2 January 1960. Written by Edward Le Brocq (1877–1964), who had worked for the Evening Post before becoming editor of the Morning News, they took the form of a letter to the editor supposedly written by an old farming couple from St. Ouen commenting on personalities, events and elections laced with humorous observations on Jersey history and traditions.

Following the death of Edward Le Brocq, George Francis Le Feuvre (1891–1984) contributed a Lettre du Bouonhomme George under the pen name George d'la Forge. Since he had emigrated to North America after the First World War and subsequently taken United States citizenship, most of the letters had either an international flavour, commenting on life and politics in America, or nostalgia for the Jersey of Le Feuvre's boyhood.

Following the death of George d'la Forge, Sir Arthur de la Mare (1914–1994), a retired ambassador, took over the task of contributing regular columns to the newspaper. Written in the Trinity dialect, as distinct from the St. Ouen dialect used by George d'la Forge, Sir Arthur's articles included reminiscences of his life as a diplomat, especially in the Far East, as well as comments on events and politics in Jersey.

Since Sir Arthur's death, a roster of contributors has maintained the tradition of the weekly (or fortnightly) newspaper column. Currently, the writer of this feature is Geraint Jennings.

== See also ==
- Guernsey Press
