= Jersey Eisteddfod =

Cultural festival and competition in Jersey

The Jersey Eisteddfod is a cultural festival and competition in Jersey.

It was founded in 1908 by former Dean of Jersey Samuel Falle, who saw its competitive classes as a means by which the speech, presentation, and musical standards of his fellow islanders might be improved. With the exception of the years of the two World Wars and 2020, it has taken place annually ever since. It was based on the Eisteddfod tradition of Wales.

After its inception the festival expanded rapidly to encompass other disciplines and crafts, with dance, art, needlework, photography being early additions, which still thrive. Sections have been discarded when no longer applicable (including laundry and shorthand) but others are adopted and integrated, including youth creative arts, crafts and flower arranging. The advent of television in the 1960s had a depressing effect on entries, but this trend was reversed by the middle of the 1980s. From that time there has been a steady increase in interest.

There are currently two festivals held annually:

- the Festival of Creative Arts, held in March (the "Spring Festival")
- the Festival of Performing Arts held in November (the "Autumn Festival").

Each attracts nearly 3,000 entries, and, via teachers, relations and supporters, it is estimated that the Jersey Eisteddfod reaches a minimum of 10 percent of the population at any one time. With its continuing growth, it has been necessary to move to larger premises for the Spring Festival, and to operate simultaneously at two venues in the Autumn. There are currently 14 autonomous sections: Arts and crafts as adult, primary school, secondary school and youth creative arts; photography, flower arranging, video, handwriting and needlework; dance, music, English speech and drama, Jèrriais and French. Each section sets its own syllabus, engages one or more adjudicators and supervises the entries and the management of the competitions; and is responsible for communications with the competitors. The management of the Jersey Eisteddfod is accomplished by volunteers who either hold office or are enrolled to assist [as in stewarding] on an occasional basis. There are currently more than 100 persons recorded as having official status.

In 1998, the Jersey Eisteddfod celebrated its 90th anniversary in a day-long event held at Samarès Manor; the year 2008 saw its centenary.
