= Augustus Asplet Le Gros =

Jersey writer

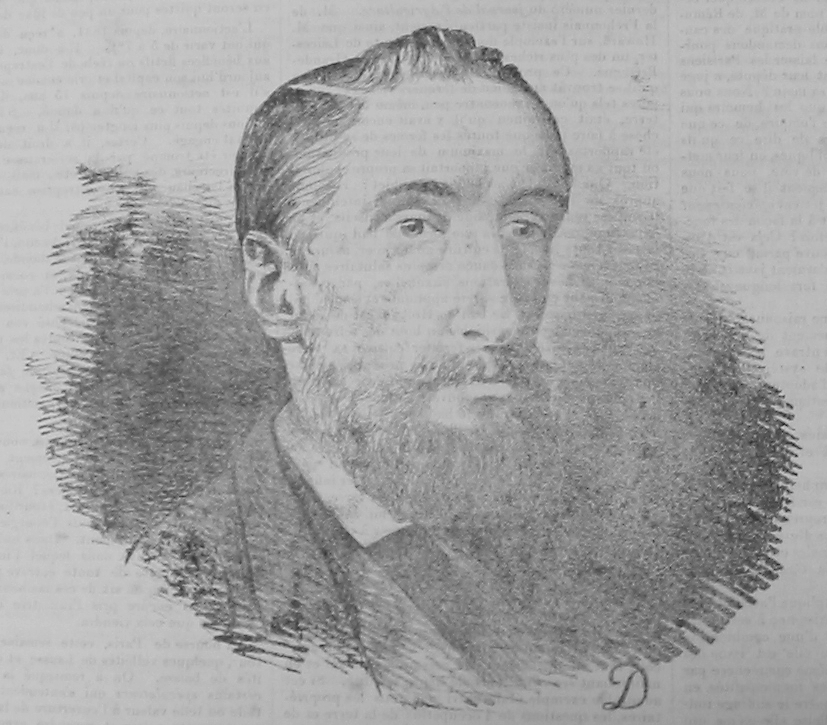
Augustus Asplet Le Gros

Augustus Asplet Le Gros or Augustus Aspley Le Gros (14 April 1840, Saint Helier – 3 December 1877) was a Norman language poet from Jersey and a Jurat of the Royal Court of Jersey.

== Biography ==
A.A. Le Gros was raised in the parish of Saint Peter, Jersey. One of the first pupils at Victoria College founded in 1852, he entered a solicitor's office, but abandoned his study of the law to work on the farm of his grandfather in Saint Peter. In 1865, he was elected secretary of the Royal Jersey Agricultural and Horticultural Society. In 1873, the parishioners of Saint Peter elected him constable, the head of the municipality.

In the same year he was one of the founders of the Société Jersiaise, of which he became the first secretary. He began work on a dictionary, which remained unfinished, of Jèrriais, which served as the basis for the Glossaire du Patois Jersiais edited by the Société Jersiaise in 1924.

His poems, in a rather lyrical style, signed A.A.L.G., in Jèrriais, in French and in English, appeared in the papers and almanacs of Jersey and Guernsey.

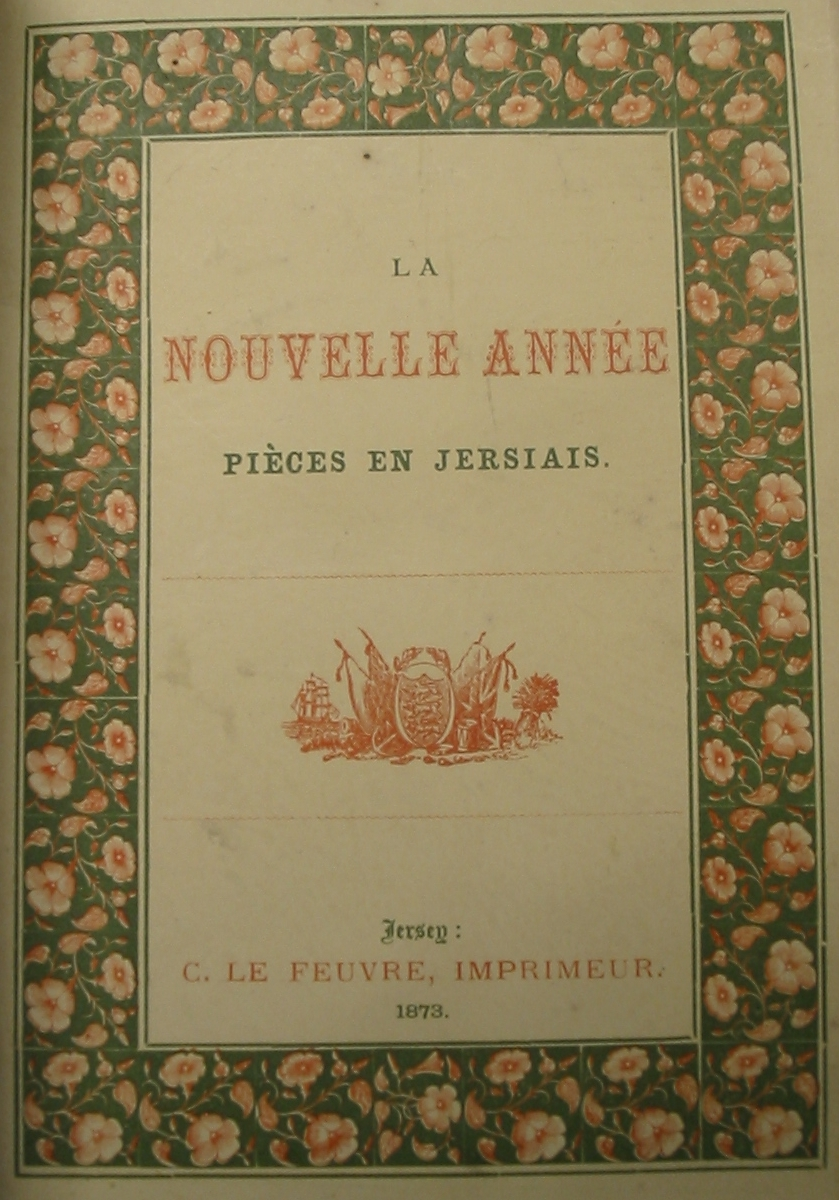
La Nouvelle Année, a review edited by A.A. Le Gros

For eight years Le Gros published a small annual review of poetry in Jèrriais and Guernésiais. He also published two small volumes of poetry in English, Poems for Home and Fireside (London, 1863) and Poems (London, 1868), besides a history of Mont Orgueil in Jersey : Mont Orgueil Castle: Its History and Ruins.

In 1875, the electors of the island made him a Jurat. He died at the age of 37 in 1877.

Some of his texts have been set to music in the 20th and 21st centuries.

== Bibliography ==
- La Grève de Lecq, Roger Jean Lebarbenchon, 1988 ISBN 2-905385-13-8 (in French)
- Bulletîn d’Quart d’An, L'Assembliée d'Jèrriais, Jersey (in Jèrriais)
- Original Songs in the Jersey Language, Jersey, 1988
