= Jèrriais =

Variety of Norman spoken in Jersey, in the Channel Islands

- jèrriais
- Native to: Jersey and Sark
- Ethnicity: Jerseys
- Native speakers: 1,900 (2011 census); 2,800 L2 speakers of Jersey and Guernsey
- Language family: Indo-European: Italic; Latino-Faliscan; Latinic; Romance; Italo-Western; Western; Gallo-Romance; Oïl; Norman; Jèrriais
- Early forms: Old Latin: Vulgar Latin; Proto-Romance; Old Gallo-Romance; Old French; Old Norman
- Dialects: Western Jèrriais; Eastern Jèrriais; Sercquiais

Official status
- Official language in: Jersey

Language codes
- ISO 639-3: –
- Glottolog: jerr1238
- ELP: Jèrriais
- Linguasphere: 51-AAA-hc
- IETF: nrf-JE
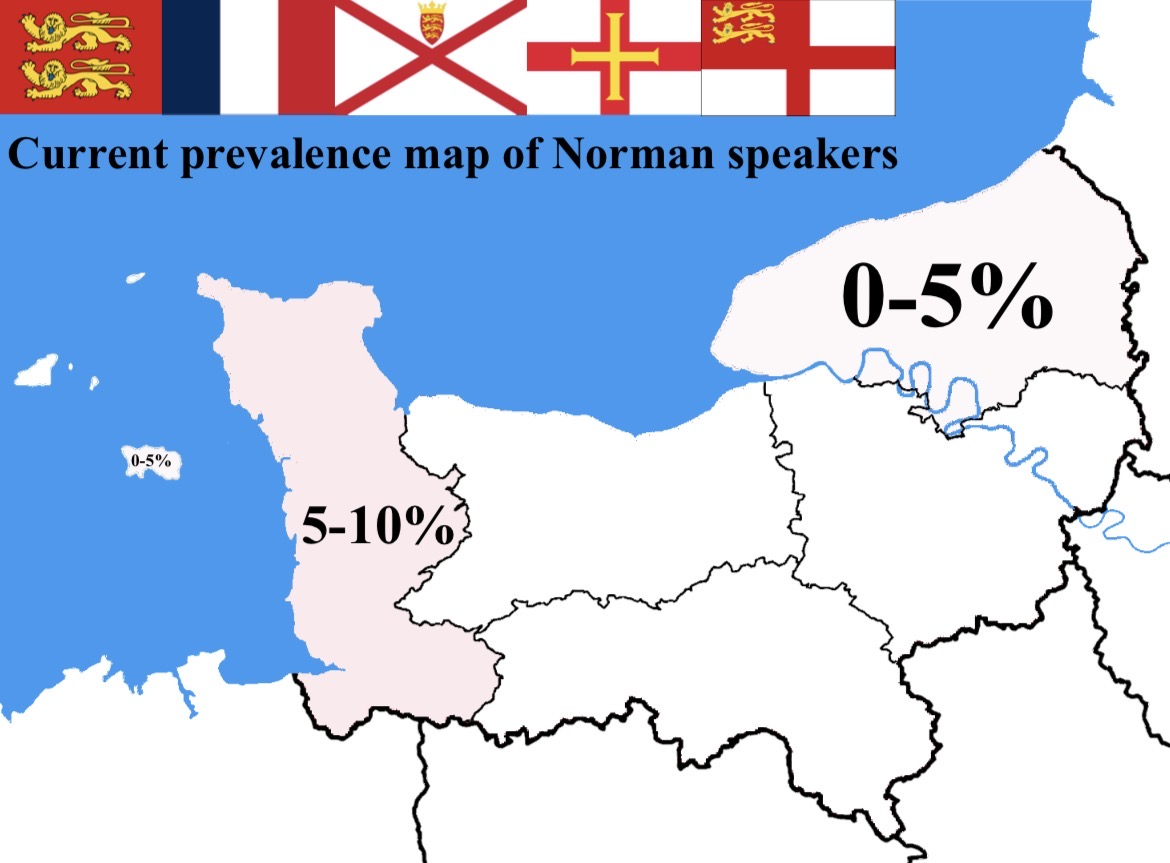
- Current prevalence map of Norman speakers

- Jèrriais is classified as Severely Endangered by the UNESCO Atlas of the World's Languages in Danger.

Jèrriais teacher Ben Spink speaks Jèrriais and tells the words of the song "Man Bieau P'tit Jèrri" by Frank Le Maistre.

Jèrriais (French: Jersiais [ʒɛʁzjɛ]; also known as the Jersey language, Jersey French and Jersey Norman French in English) is a Romance language and the traditional language of the Jersey people. It is a form of the Norman language spoken in Jersey, an island in the Channel Islands archipelago off the coast of France. Its closest relatives are the other Norman languages, such as Guernésiais, spoken in neighbouring Guernsey, and the other langues d'oïl.

Use of Jèrriais has been in decline over the past century, as English has increasingly become the language of education, commerce and administration on Jersey. There are very few people who speak Jèrriais as a mother tongue and, owing to the age of the remaining speakers, their numbers decrease annually. Efforts are being made to keep the language alive.

The language of Sark, Sercquiais, is a descendant of the Jèrriais brought by the Jersey colonists who settled Sark in the 16th century, with mutual intelligibility with the Norman language of mainland Normandy.

Jèrriais is often called "Jersey French" or "Jersey Norman French" in English (though this may give the impression that the language is a dialect of French) and jersiais or normand de Jersey in French. Jèrriais is distinct from the Jersey Legal French used for legal contracts, laws and official documents by the government and administration of Jersey. For this reason, some prefer using the term "Jersey Norman" to avoid ambiguity and to dissociate the language from standard French.

== History ==
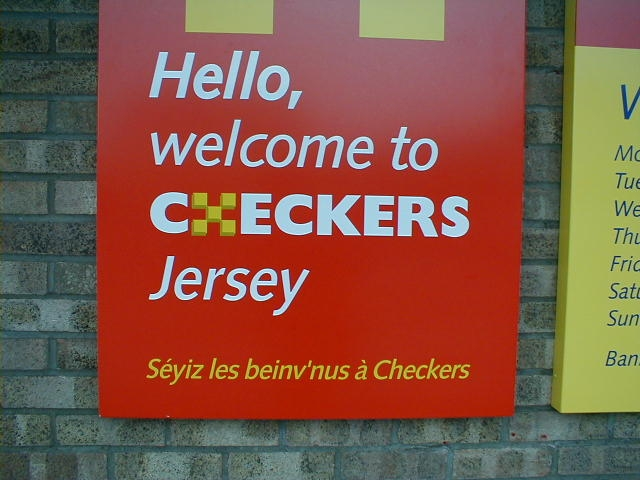
Some bilingual (or trilingual) signage may be seen in Jersey, such as this welcome sign at a supermarket.

Although few now speak Jèrriais as a first language, until the 19th century it was used as the everyday language for the majority of the population of Jersey; even as late as the beginning of the Second World War, up to half the population could still communicate in the language. (Note: There is, conversely, no complete Bible in Jèrriais; despite the widespread use of the language, French was the predominant language used by the Church in Jersey until the 20th century. However, versions of well-known Bible texts in Jèrriais do exist, and most sermons would be preached, or passages of the Bible explained, in Jèrriais in country areas.) Despite this, awareness of the decline of language use became apparent in the 19th century in scholarly circles. Among foreign linguists, Louis Lucien Bonaparte visited Jersey and interested himself in the language and its literature. Victor Hugo, during his exile in Jersey, took an interest in the language and numbered some Jèrriais writers among his circle of acquaintances and supporters.

Sir Robert Pipon Marett's prestige and influence helped to reinforce the movement toward standardisation of the writing system based on French orthography, a trend which was also helped by the Norman literary revival beginning in the neighbouring Cotentin Peninsula of mainland Normandy, where writers inspired by the example of the Norman writers of Jersey and Guernsey, also began to produce literary works. However, differing (if mutually comprehensible) writing systems have been adopted in Jersey, Guernsey, and mainland Normandy. It is sometimes asked whether Jèrriais should move to a writing system based on French orthography; however, this would have implications for the continuity of the literary tradition over two centuries or more, though some features of the language's writing system, such as the digraph "th" for the typical dental fricative of Jèrriais, have evidently been borrowed from English orthography.

As English became dominant in Jersey in the 20th century, efforts were made to preserve the Jèrriais language. The Jersey Eisteddfod has included a Jèrriais section since 1912. Associations were founded; L'Assembliée d'Jèrriais was founded in 1951, while Le Don Balleine is a trust set up in accordance with the will of Arthur E. Balleine (1864–1943), who bequeathed funds for the promotion of the language. L'Assembliée d'Jèrriais launched a quarterly magazine in 1952, which has been published since (with the occasional hiatus, and latterly under the editorship of Le Don Balleine); a standard grammar Lé Jèrriais pour tous (by Paul Birt) appeared in 1985; cassettes, booklets and other materials have also been produced.

George d'la Forge's maintenance of the language in the North American diaspora is not as surprising as it might seem, as considerable numbers of Jersey people had been involved in the economic development and exploitation of the New World (see New Jersey). Much of the concentration focused on the cod fisheries of the Gaspé peninsula in Quebec, Canada, which were controlled into the early 20th century by Jersey-based companies or companies of Jersey origin employing Jersey labour. The common language of business was Jèrriais, and it is reported that there were still some Jèrriais-speakers in Gaspé villages in the 1960s. The Gaspesian expression "faire une runne" (to go and work outside the region) comes from the Jèrriais word "run" applied to a fishing station.

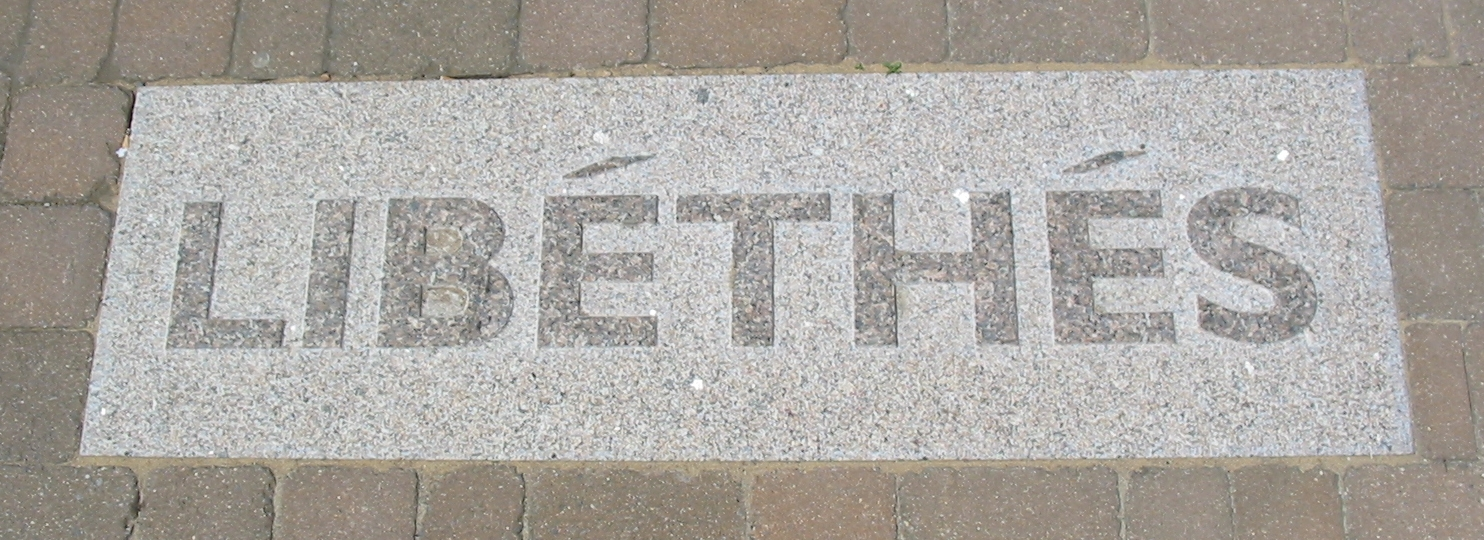
An inscription, reading "Liberated" in Jèrriais, was installed at La Pièche dé l'Av'nîn in St. Helier in 2005 to mark the 60th anniversary of the Liberation.

The use of Jèrriais is also noted during the German occupation of the Channel Islands during the Second World War; the local population used it among themselves as a language which neither the occupying Germans, nor their French interpreters, could understand. However, the social and economic upheaval of the war meant that use of English increased dramatically after the Liberation.

It is considered that the last monolingual adult speakers probably died in the 1950s, although monolingual children were being received into schools in St. Ouen as late as the late 1970s.

Famous Jèrriais speakers include Lillie Langtry and Sir John Everett Millais, the Pre-Raphaelite painter, who are reported to have spoken to each other in the language when he was painting her portrait.

=== Dictionaries ===
The history of Jèrriais dictionaries goes back to 19th century manuscript glossaries of Philippe Langlois, A. A. Le Gros, and Thomas Gaudin. These were later revised and expanded into the Glossaire du Patois Jersiais published in 1924 by La Société Jersiaise. The 1960 Glossary of Jersey French (Nichol Spence) recorded Jèrriais in a phonetic script. The 1924 Glossaire inspired the research by Frank Le Maistre that culminated in the Dictionnaire Jersiais–Français published in 1966 to mark the 900th anniversary of the Norman Conquest of England. The first practical English–Jèrriais dictionary was the English-Jersey Language Vocabulary (Albert Carré in collaboration with Frank Le Maistre and Philip de Veulle, 1972) which was itself based on the Dictionnaire Jersiais–Français. A children's picture dictionary, Les Preunmié Mille Mots, was published by La Société Jersiaise in 2000. In 2005, a Jèrriais–English dictionary, Dictionnaithe Jèrriais-Angliais was published by La Société Jersiaise, in collaboration with Le Don Balleine. A revised, modernised and expanded English–Jèrriais dictionary, Dictionnaithe Angliais-Jèrriais, was published in 2008 by Le Don Balleine.

== Status ==
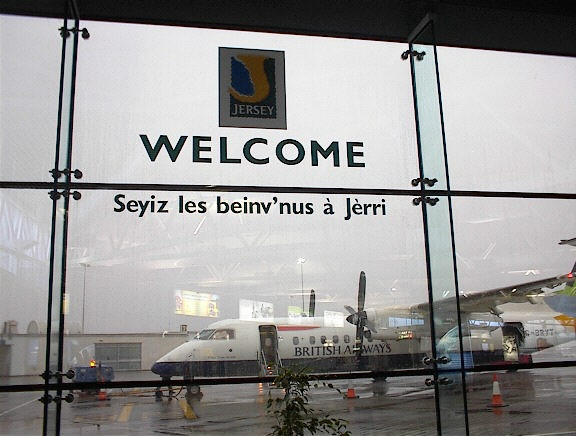
Jersey Airport greets travellers with "Welcome to Jersey" in Jèrriais.

Local newspaper Jersey Evening Post hosts a Jersey Norman-French feature, with Jèrriais texts accompanied by their translation into English.

The latest figures come from the Jersey Annual Social Survey issued on 5 December 2012. The survey of 4200 households took place in June 2012 and resulted in 2400 returns. It showed that 18% of the population could speak some Jèrriais words and phrases, with more than 7% of those over 65 being fluent or able to speak a significant amount of Jèrriais. Two-thirds of adults said that they could not understand spoken Jèrriais, but more than a quarter were able to understand some, and 5% could usually or fully understand someone speaking Jèrriais. 4% of people said that they could write some Jèrriais, although under 1% could write fluently. Just under a third (32%) said that they could understand something written in Jèrriais.

These figures update those of the census of 2001, which showed that approximately 3% of the island's population spoke Jèrriais in their personal interactions, although research suggests that up to 15% of the population have some understanding of the language. The latest census figures also showed an increase in declarations of children speaking the language: the first such increase recorded in census figures (although this may be due to greater consciousness among parents rather than to language use), doubtless encouraged by the introduction of a Jèrriais teaching programme into Jersey schools.

The parish with the highest proportion of Jèrriais speakers (8%) is Saint Ouen, and the parish with the lowest proportion (2.1%) is Saint Helier, although that is the largest parish and has the highest number of Jèrriais speakers. The number of census respondents who stated that they "usually" spoke Jèrriais was 113; 2,761 respondents stated that they "sometimes" spoke it. A survey carried out among a sample of Jèrriais speakers in 1996 found that 18% spoke the language more often than English, 66% spoke it as often as English, and 16% spoke it less often than English.

The States of Jersey fund the teaching programme in schools and provide some support in terms of signage, such as welcome signs at harbours and the airport. Ratification of the European Charter for Regional or Minority Languages is under discussion. In September 2005, the States approved the development of a cultural strategy, one of whose strategic objectives was as follows:

Jersey almost lost its language in the 20th century. By 2001 there were less than 3,000 speakers of Jèrriais. In the 21st century strenuous efforts are being made to re-establish it. Le Don Balleine, funded by the States, is leading a programme in schools teaching Jèrriais. L'Assembliée d'Jèrriais promotes the language generally. Language brings distinctiveness, a sense of localness and a whole new set of skills all of which are important qualities in attracting the creative economy. It is fundamental to the Island's identity. This objective is to work with these organisations to help in the revival and status of the language.

In September 2009, a partnership agreement was signed by the Minister for Education, Sport and Culture and the President of Le Don Balleine to formalise the role of L'Office du Jèrriais in protecting and promoting Jèrriais and to develop a language plan to help make the language more prominent on a daily basis; there is newspaper and radio output in the language, and as part of the language's promotion, from 2010, Jersey banknotes carry the value of the note written out in Jèrriais. Jèrriais is currently classified as "threatened" by the Endangered Languages Project.

Jèrriais is recognised as a regional language by the British and Irish governments within the framework of the British–Irish Council. On 13 February 2019, the States of Jersey adopted Jèrriais as an official language, and the language is set to be used on signage and official letter headings.

== Phonology ==
Jèrriais Consonants
		Labial	Dental/ Alveolar		Post- alveolar	Palatal	Velar/ glottal
		Labial	plain	sibilant	Post- alveolar	Palatal	Velar/ glottal
Nasal		m	n			ɲ	
Plosive/ affricate	voiceless	p	t		tʃ		k
Plosive/ affricate	voiced	b	d		dʒ		ɡ
Fricative	voiceless	f		s	ʃ		h
Fricative	voiced	v	ð	z	ʒ		
Rhotic			r				
Approximant	plain		l			j	
Approximant	labial					ɥ	w

/r/ may also be heard as an approximant sound [ɹ].

The phonological influence of Norse is debated, although the aspirated "h" may be due to Norse influence.

Jèrriais Oral Vowels
	Front		Back
	unrounded	rounded	Back
Close	i iː	y yː	u uː
Close-mid	e eː	ø øː	o oː
Open-mid	ɛ ɛː	œ œː	
Open	a aː		

Nasal Vowels
	Front		Back
	unrounded	rounded	Back
Close-mid	ẽ ẽː	ø̃ ø̃ː	õ õː
Open-mid	ɛ̃ ɛ̃ː		
Open			ɑ̃ ɑ̃ː

=== Palatalisation ===
The palatalisation of Latin /k/ and /ɡ/ before /a/ that occurred in the development of French did not occur in northern dialects of Norman, including Jèrriais:

Jèrriais	English	French
acater	to buy	acheter
cat	cat	chat
vaque	cow	vache
caud	warm	chaud
gardîn	garden	jardin
gambe	leg	jambe

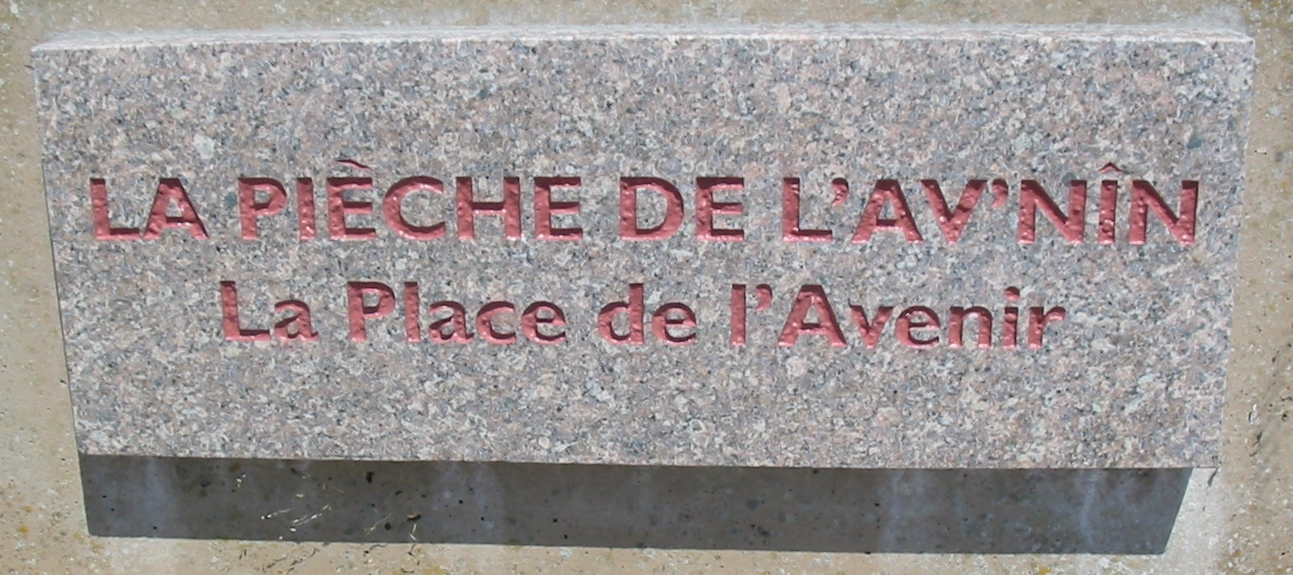
Palatalization is evident in Jèrriais pièche compared with French place (though they are not cognate) in this bilingual placename sign.

However, the palatalisation of /k/ before front vowels produced different results in the Norman dialect that developed into Jèrriais than in French. (Many developments are similar to those in Italian, cf. cento "hundred" and faccia "face".)

Jèrriais	English	French
bachîn	basin	bassine
fache	face	face
faichon	fashion	façon
chent	hundred	cent

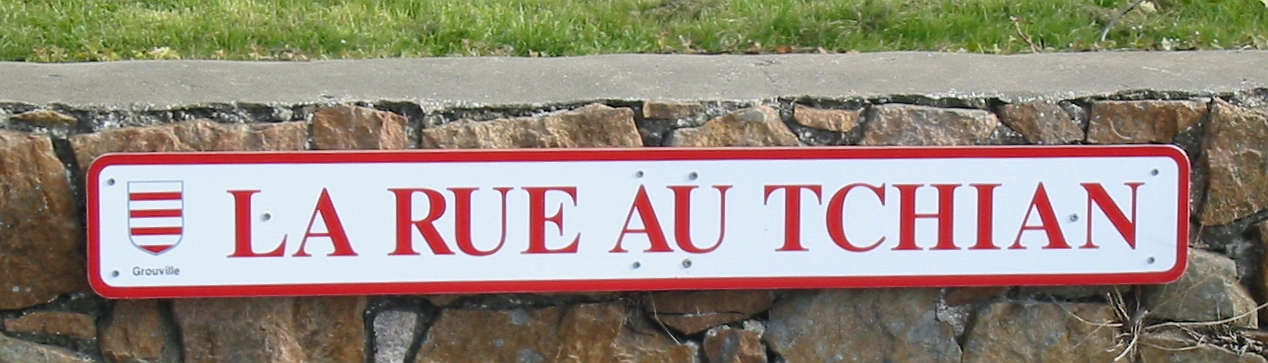
La Rue au Tchian (road of the dog): Latin canem (dog) developed into tchian, an example of the palatalisation of /k/.

At a later date surviving /k/ and /ɡ/ underwent a secondary process of palatalisation:

Jèrriais	English	French
motchi	to mock	moquer
patchet	packet	paquet
dgide	guide	guide

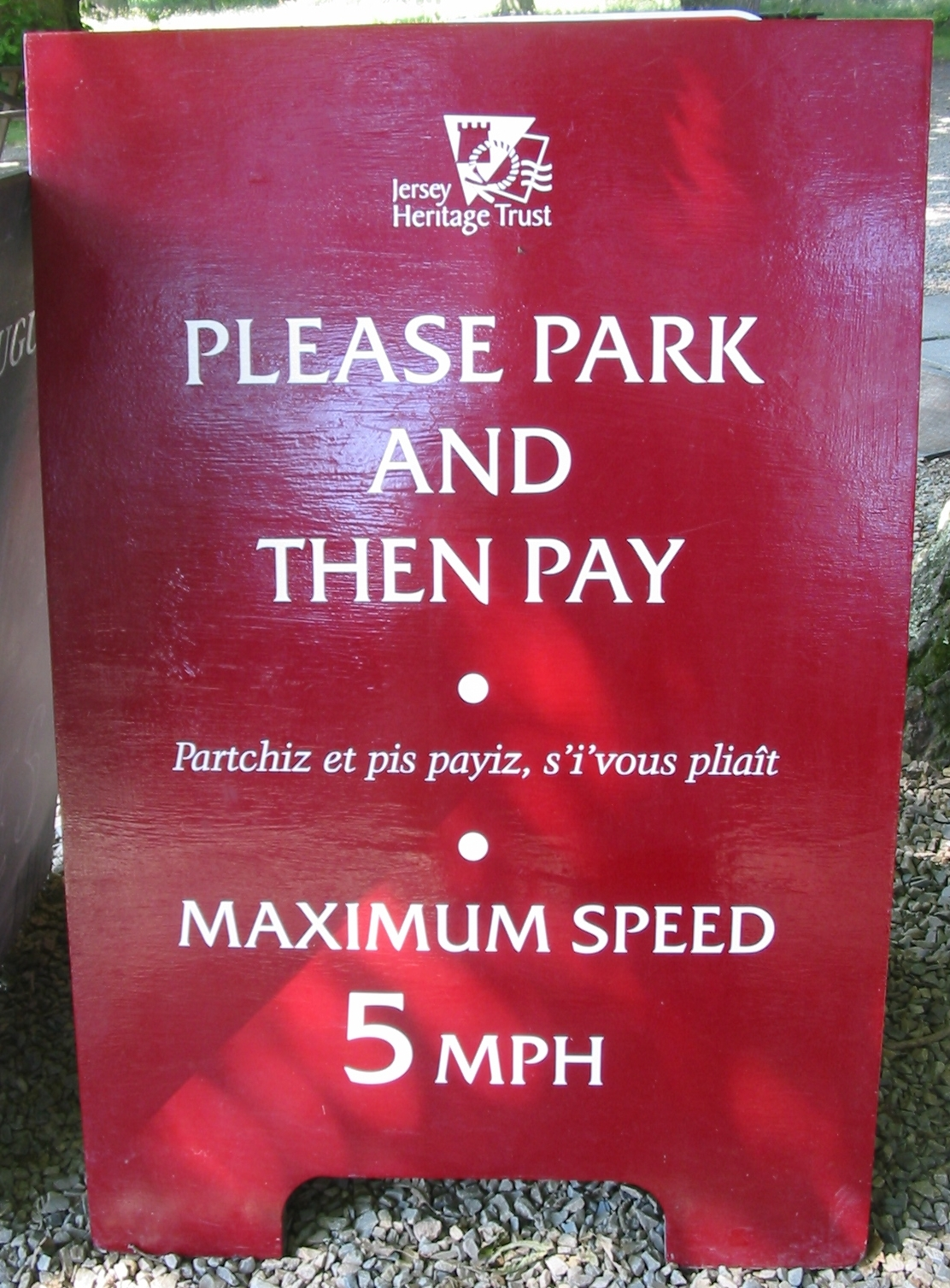
The word partchiz ("park") is a result of palatalization.

This palatalisation continues to operate (except in initial position) as can be seen by recent borrowings from English:

Jèrriais	English
beustchi	to busk
coutchi	to cook
pliodgi	to plug
braidgeux	bragger

=== Dental fricative ===
A feature of Jèrriais that is immediately noticeable and distinguishes it from neighbouring languages is the voiced dental fricative /ð/, written th, that typically occurs in intervocalic position:

Jèrriais	French	English
bathi	barril	barrel
m'suther	mesurer	to measure
paiethie	paierie (payment office)	payment
ouothilyi	oreiller	pillow

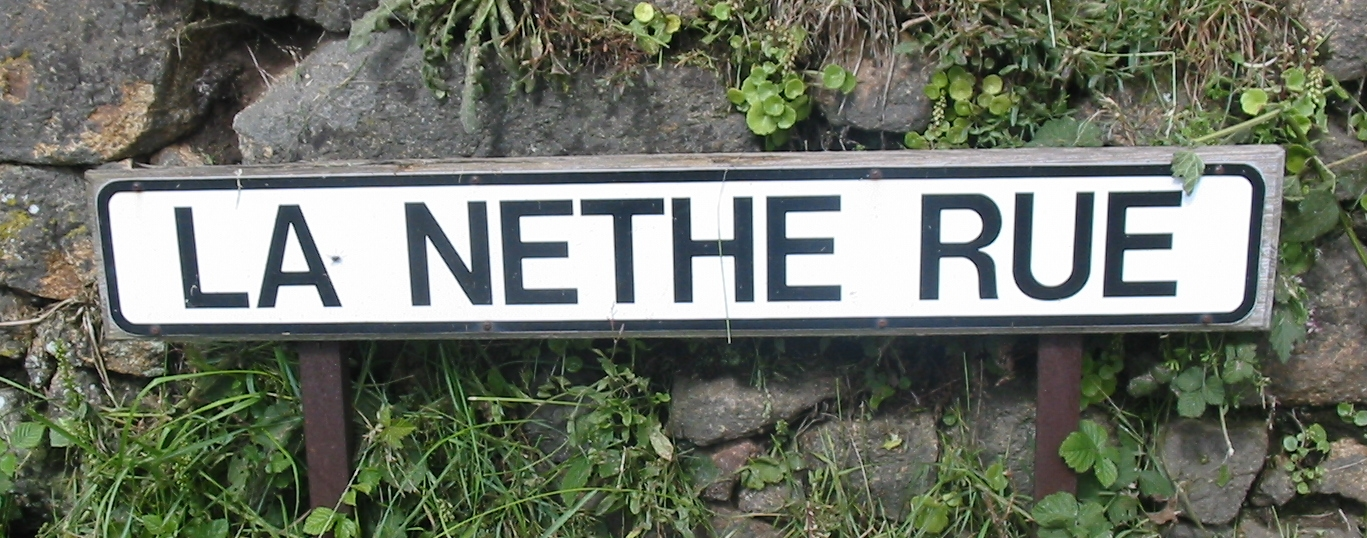
La Néthe Rue road name (meaning the black road) shows the th digraph representing the voiced dental fricative.

Or in final position:

Jèrriais	French	English
méthe	mère	mother
braithe	braire (bray)	to cry

The fricative devoices to assimilate with a neighbouring unvoiced consonant in words such as paqu'thie (packing) or malaûc'theux (disgusting).

The fricative developed from /r/ + front vowel, but evidently after the 16th century as this feature is unknown in the language of Sark (colonised by Jersey families). Although the voiced dental fricative is standard in the literary language, it is not found in the eastern dialects.

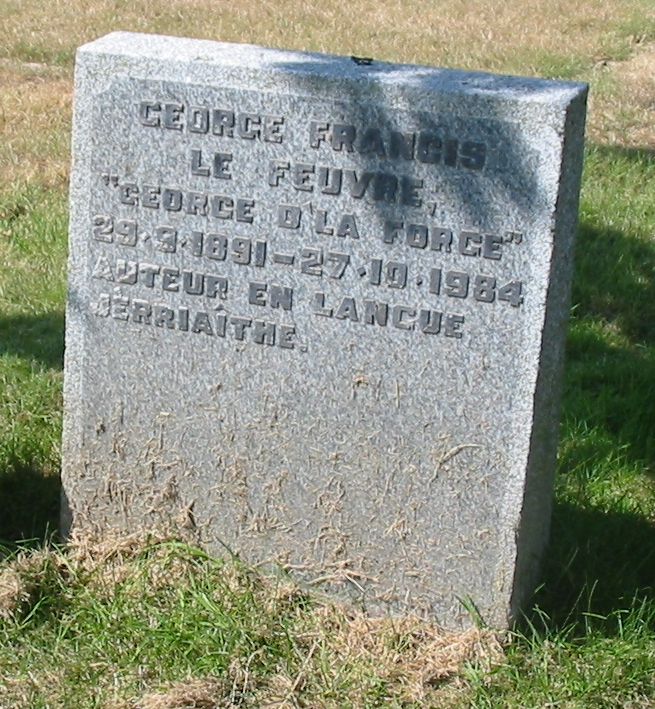
This gravestone of George Francis Le Feuvre ("George d'la Forge"), at St. Ouen Parish Church, describes him as Auteur en langue Jèrriaîthe (Jèrriais author). The particular St. Ouennais form of Jèrriaise with final dental fricative is represented.

Some older speakers in St. Ouen use a dental fricative in positions where other dialects show a /z/. This may be represented in the orthography of particular writers.

standard Jèrriais	St. Ouennais	English
maîson	maiethon	house
ouaîselîn	ouaiethelîn	birds (collective)
tchaîse	tchaîthe	chair
anglyiciser	anglyicîther	anglicise

The dental fricative in the dialect of such speakers may also be heard in liaison:

standard Jèrriais	St. Ouennais	English
ous êtes	ous'th êtes	you are
ches ôtis	ches'th ôtis	these tools
nou-s-a	nou-th-a	one has

=== Length ===
Length is phonemic in Jèrriais. Long vowels are usually indicated in writing by a circumflex accent. A noun ending in a vowel lengthens the final vowel to indicate the plural (shown in writing by adding an s).

Gemination occurs regularly in verb tenses, indicated by a consonant-apostrophe-consonant trigraph, for example: ou pâl'la (she will speak); jé c'mench'chons (we will begin); i' donn'nait (he would give). Gerunds will also regularly contain geminate consonants, for example: faîs'sie (doing, making); chant'tie (singing); tith'thie (shooting); brîng'gie (sweeping); gângn'nie (winning).

== Orthography ==
Consonants
	IPA	English equivalent	Examples
b	[b]	b	bé, bouon
c	[k]	k	couochi, cat
c (before e, i, y)	[s]	s	cidre, cŷnge
ç	[s]	s	cidre, cŷnge
ch	[ʃ]	sh	fache, scienche
d	[d]	d	dithe, d'vanté
dg	[dʒ]	j	dgèrre, Dgèrnésy
f	[f]	f	fé, f'nêntre
g	[ɡ]	g	Galles, g'nachon
g	∅	silent	vîgnt
g (before e, i)	[ʒ]	zh (French j; s as in measure or vision)	géniche, g'nors
h	∅	silent	histouaithe, êbahi
h	[h]	h	happer, hâvre
i	[j]	y	ièrs, ieux
j	[ʒ]	zh (French j; s as in measure or vision)	janne, Jèrri
k	[k]	k	kilomètre
l	[l]	l	labouother, oulle
l (before i or y) except l'ye	∅	silent	pliat meubl'ye
-ill	[j]	y	travailli (ex. mille)
m	[m]	m	méthe, èrmèrtchi
n	[n]	n	nouvé, nièr
ngn	[ɲ]	ny (onion); think Spanish "ñ"	gâgni
p	[p]	p	péthe, pommyi
p	∅	silent	corps, sept
qu	[k]	k	qui, quédaine
r	[r]	rr in Spanish	vèr, hardi
r	∅	silent	haler, aimer
s	[s]	s	saver, sé
s	[z]	z	rose, loûser
sc	[s]	s	scîn
t	[t]	t	tither, té
tch	[tʃ]	ch	motchi, patchet
ti(on)	[s]	s	suffocâtion
th	[ð]	"hard" or "voiced" th-sound (as in that)	péthe, muthâle
th	[θ]	"soft" or "voiceless" th-sound (as in thin)	maqu'thé
v	[v]	v	vèrt, vyi
w	[w]	w	loan words
x	[s]/[z]	s or z	souaixante
y	[j]	y	yi, preunmyi
z	[z]	z	gâzette, zoulou

Vowels
IPA		English equivalent	Examples
i	i		
iː	î		
y	u		
yː	û		
u	ou		
uː	oû		
e	é		
eː	ée		
ø	oe		
øː	oê		
o	o		
oː	ô		
ɛ	è		
ɛː	ê		
œ	òe		
œː	òê		
a	a		
aː	â		
ẽ	in		
ẽː	în		
ø̃	un		
ø̃ː	ûn		
õ	on		
õː	ôn		
ɛ̃	en		
ɛ̃ː	ên		
ɑ̃	an		
ɑ̃ː	ân		

== Grammar ==
=== Verbs ===
==== Aspect ====
Jèrriais distinguishes between simple, progressive and perfect aspect:

Past:

preterite	j'pâlînmes	we spoke
progressive	ou 'tait à pâler	she was speaking
perfect	ous avez pâlé	you have spoken
imperfect	j'pâlais	I spoke

Future:

simple	j'pâl'lai	I will speak
progressive	tu s'sa à pâler	you will be speaking
perfect	oulle étha pâlé	she will have spoken

Present:

simple	j'pâle	I speak
progressive	i' sont à pâler	they are speaking

==== Iterative ====
Verbs can be made iterative in aspect by prefixing èr- (long form) or r' (short form):

aver	have
èraver	have again
êt'	be
èrêt'	be again
netti	clean
èrnettit	clean again
muchi	hide
èrmuchi	hide again
èrgarder	watch
èrèrgarder	watch again
téléphoner	phone
èrtéléphoner	phone again

==== Gerunds ====
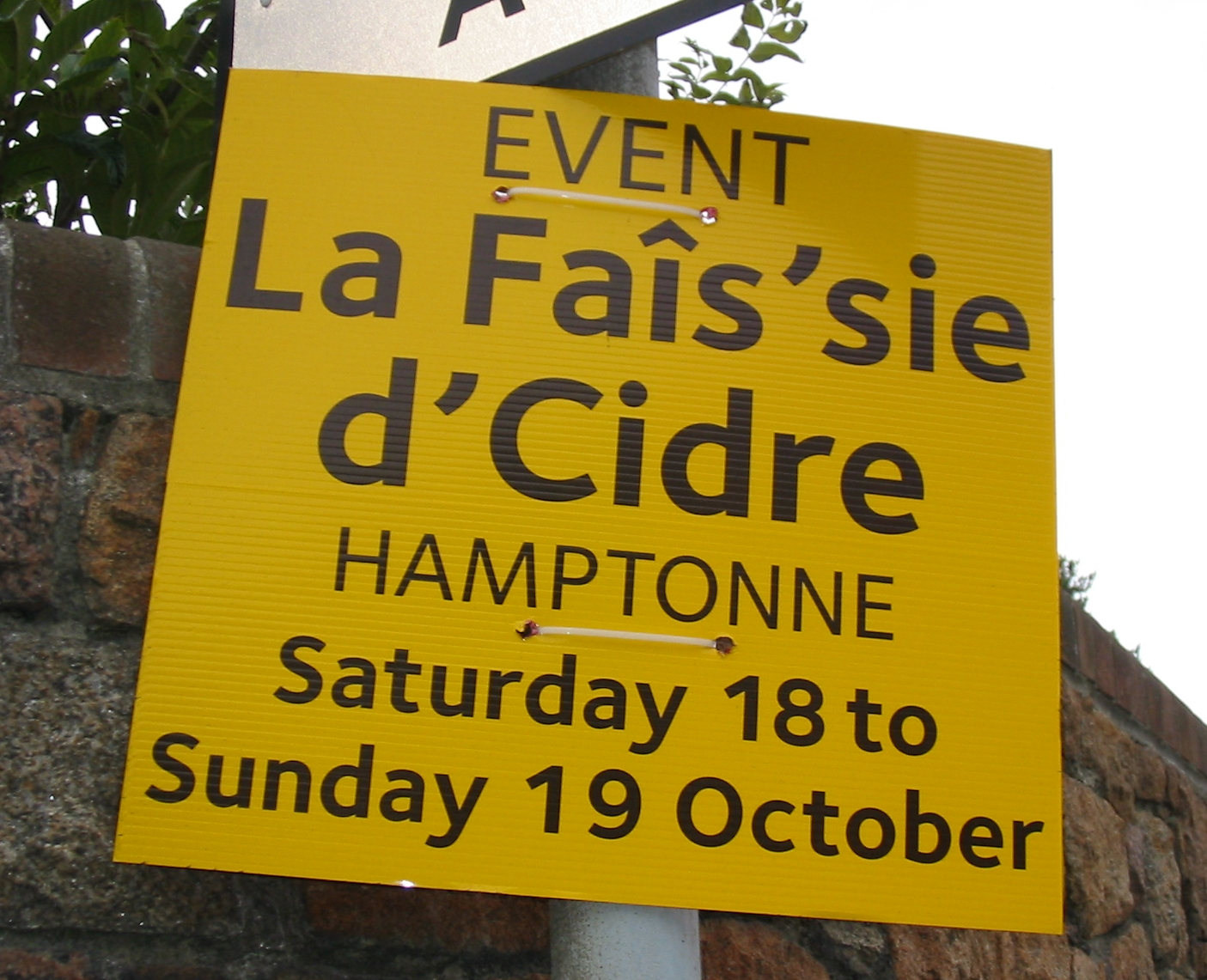
This sign for a cidermaking event demonstrates the gemination s's in the gerund faîs'sie.

Verbs can be transformed into gerunds, which are commonly used:

chanter	sing
chant'tie	singing
faithe	make
faîs'sie	making
haler	pull
hal'lie	hauling, haulage
partchi	park
parqu'thie	parking
liéthe	read
liéthie	reading
faxer	fax
faxéthie	faxing

== Vocabulary ==
Although Jèrriais is occasionally misleadingly described as a mixture of Old Norse and French, it is more linguistically accurate to describe the language as Norse adapted to langue d'oïl; when Norse-speaking Normans (lit. "North-man") conquered the territory now known as Normandy, they began speaking the language of their new subjects, leading to its influence on the language. The Norman language is therefore in essence a Romance language with a certain amount of vocabulary of Norse origin, with the inclusion of later loanwords from other languages.

=== Influence of Norse ===
Norse origins can be seen in Jèrriais words such as these:

- mielle (sand dune)
- mogue (mug)
- bel (yard)
- gradile (blackcurrant)
- mauve (seagull)
- graie (to prepare)
- hèrnais (cart)
- bète (bait)
- haûter (to doze)

=== Influence of Breton ===
Jèrriais has also adopted a small number of words from the Breton language (e.g. pihangne 'spider crab', from Breton bihan 'small'; quédaine 'fast', from Breton gaden 'hare'), although the influence on today's language has overwhelmingly been from French and, increasingly, English.

=== Influence of French ===
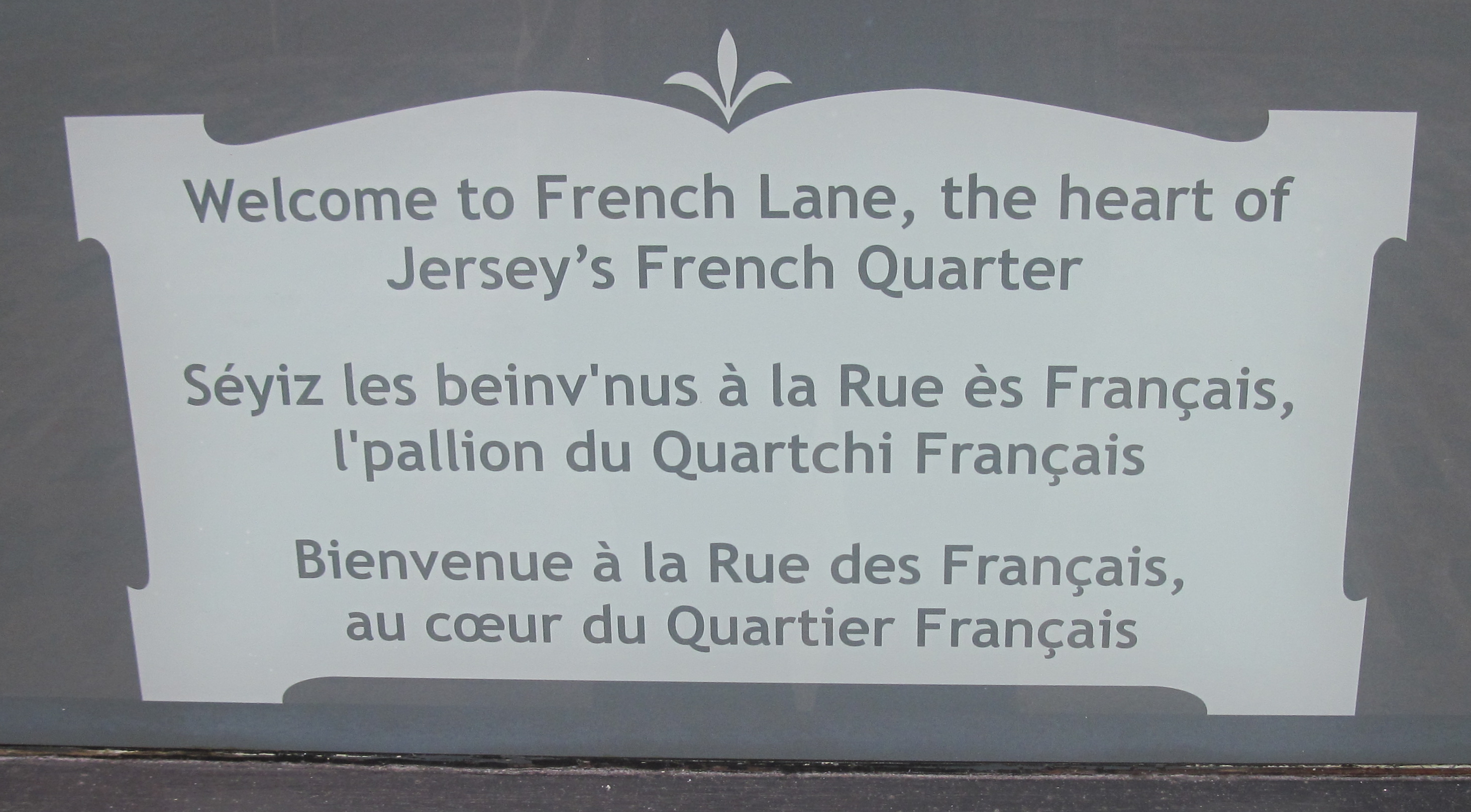

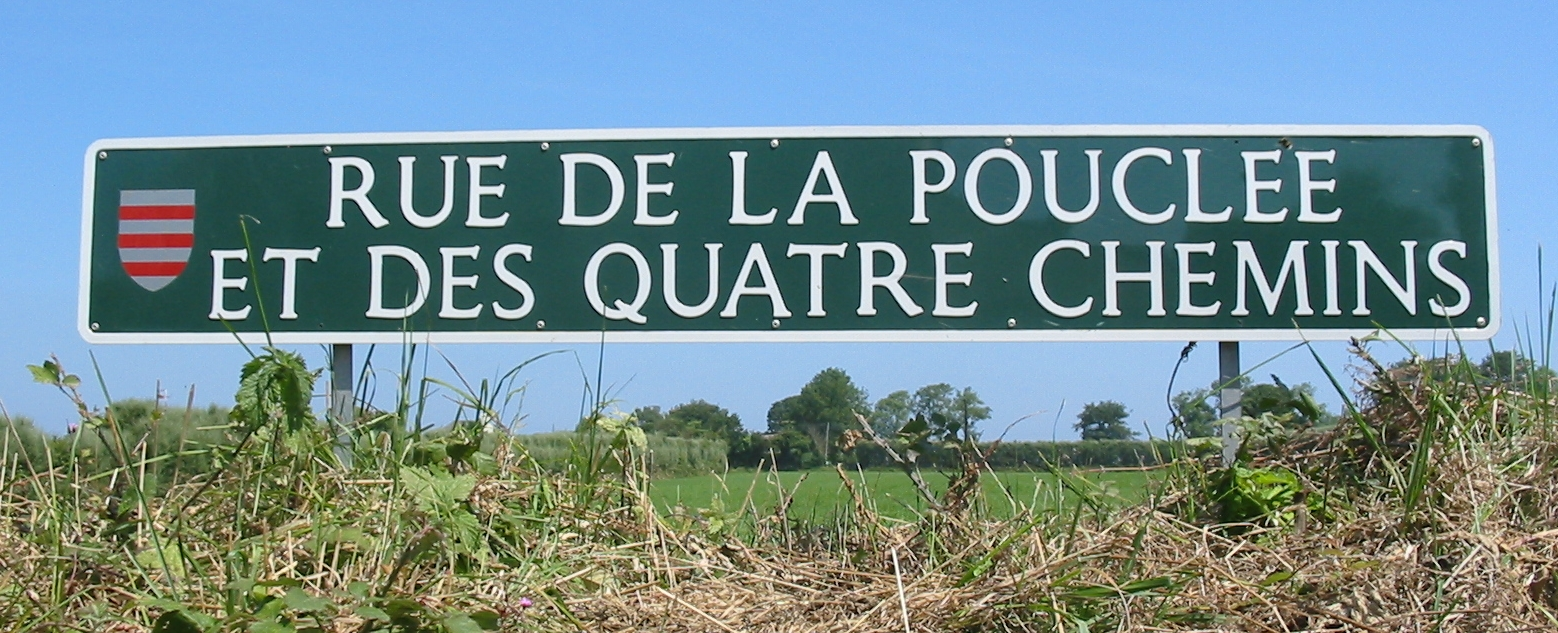
In this road sign, mostly in French, the word pouclée is Jèrriais for dolmen.

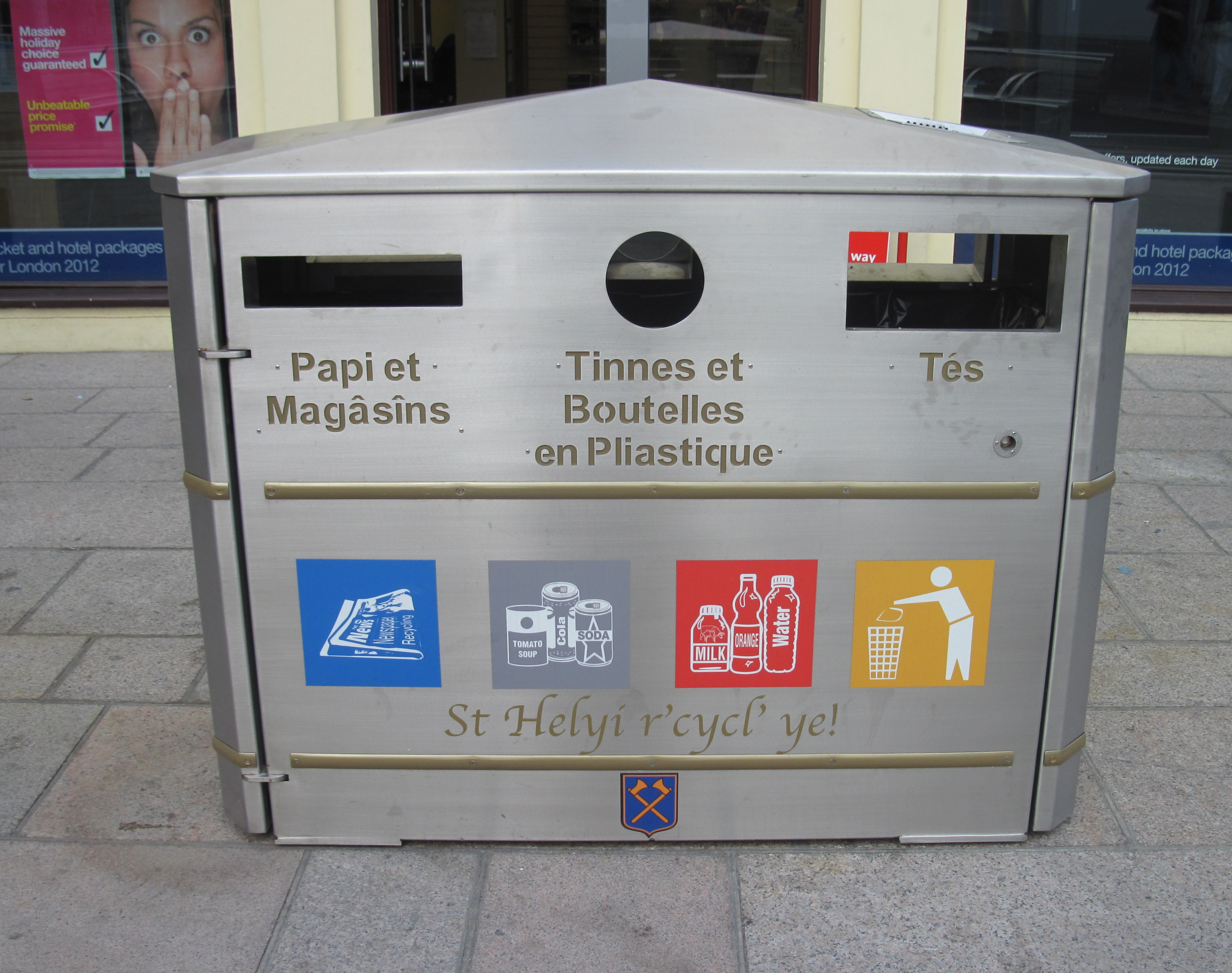

A large number of gallicisms have been introduced into the language due to the use of French as an official language and the cultural influence of France and French literature. Some French words have displaced in modern usage Jèrriais words that can still be found in older texts from the 18th and 19th centuries, for example:

- French leçon (in the form léçon) has displaced native lichon (lesson)
- French garçon has displaced native hardé (boy)
- French chanson has displaced native canchon (song)

Efforts are being made to maintain some Jèrriais words which are competing in usage with French forms, for example:

- native hielle is being promoted over French huile (oil)
- native huiptante (eighty) is being promoted over French quatre-vingts (fourscore)

=== Influence of English ===
Some maritime vocabulary was borrowed from English at an early date, for example baûsouîn (boatswain), but by the late 18th century some domestic vocabulary, such as:

- bliatchinner (to polish shoes, from blacking)
- coutchi (to cook)
- grévîn (gravy)
- ouâchinner (to rub in soapy water, from washing)
- scrobbine-broche (scrubbing brush)
- sâsse-paine (saucepan)
- stchilet (skillet)
- ticl'ye (from tea-kettle)

entered the language through the employment of Jèrriais-speaking servants in the houses of bourgeois English-speaking immigrants.

Other words borrowed from English before 1900 include:

- chârer (to share)
- drâses (underpants, from drawers)
- ouothinner (to worry)
- ouadinne (cotton wool, from wadding)
- nosse (nurse)
- souîndgi (to throw, from swing)
- sténer (to stand, to endure)

However, care needs to be taken in attempting to identify anglicisms because some words, such as mogue (mug) and canne (can), which are often assumed to have been borrowed from English, were in fact Norman words exported to England in the wake of the Norman Conquest; and words such as fliotchet (flock) and ridgi (rig) are Norman cognates of English words.

More recently, words such as boutchi (to book), partchi (to park) and tyeur (tyre) have been absorbed into the language, although current initiatives in creating neologisms for technological and social innovations prefer to avoid wholesale borrowing where possible. Among recent coinings are words such as textéthie for texting, maître-pêtre for webmaster (literally master-spider) and mégabouochi for megabyte.

== Literature ==
The tradition of literature in Jèrriais can be traced back to Wace, a 12th century Jersey-born poet, although there is little surviving literature in Jèrriais dating to before the introduction of the first printing press in Jersey in the 1780s. The first printed Jèrriais appeared in the first newspapers at the end of the 18th century, and the earliest identified dated example of printed poetry is a fragment by Matchi L'Gé (Matthew Le Geyt 1777–1849), dated to 1795. A boom in competing newspapers and journals throughout the 19th century provided a platform for poets and writers to publish regularly – typically, satirical comment on the week's news, elections, Jersey politicians and notables. The first printed anthology of Jèrriais poetry, Rimes Jersiaises, was published in 1865.

Influential writers include "Laelius" (Sir Robert Pipon Marett 1820–1884, Bailiff of Jersey, 1880–1884), "A.A.L.G." (Augustus Aspley Le Gros, 1840–1877), and "St.-Luorenchais" (Philippe Langlois, 1817–1884). "Elie" (Edwin J. Luce, 1881–1918) was editor of the French language newspaper La Nouvelle Chronique de Jersey, and a poet who wrote topical poems for the newspaper. He was also active in promoting the development of drama in Jèrriais and organised performances, ultimately leading to the establishment of a Jèrriais section of the Jersey Eisteddfod in 1912.

During the German occupation of the Channel Islands, Nazi censors permitted little original writing to be published. However, many older pieces of literature were re-published in the newspapers as an act of cultural self-assertion and morale-boosting. Following the end of Occupation, and with the re-establishment of the free press, Edward Le Brocq (1877–1964) revived a weekly column in 1946 with a letter from "Ph'lip et Merrienne", supposedly a traditional old couple who would comment on the latest news or recall times past.

The most influential writer of Jèrriais in the 20th century was a U.S. citizen, George Francis Le Feuvre (1891–1984), whose pen-name was "George d'la Forge". He emigrated to North America after the First World War, but for almost forty years maintained a flow of articles in Jèrriais back to Jersey for publication in newspapers. Selections of his articles have been published in book form.

Frank Le Maistre (1910–2002), compiler of the dictionary Dictionnaire Jersiais–Français, maintained a literary output starting in the 1930s with newspaper articles under the pseudonym "Marie la Pie", poems, magazine articles, research into toponymy and etymology. Since Le Maistre, Geraint Jennings has been influential in preserving the language by compiling thousands of pages of Jèrriais text online in Les Pages Jèrriaises, including parts of the Bible.

== Examples ==
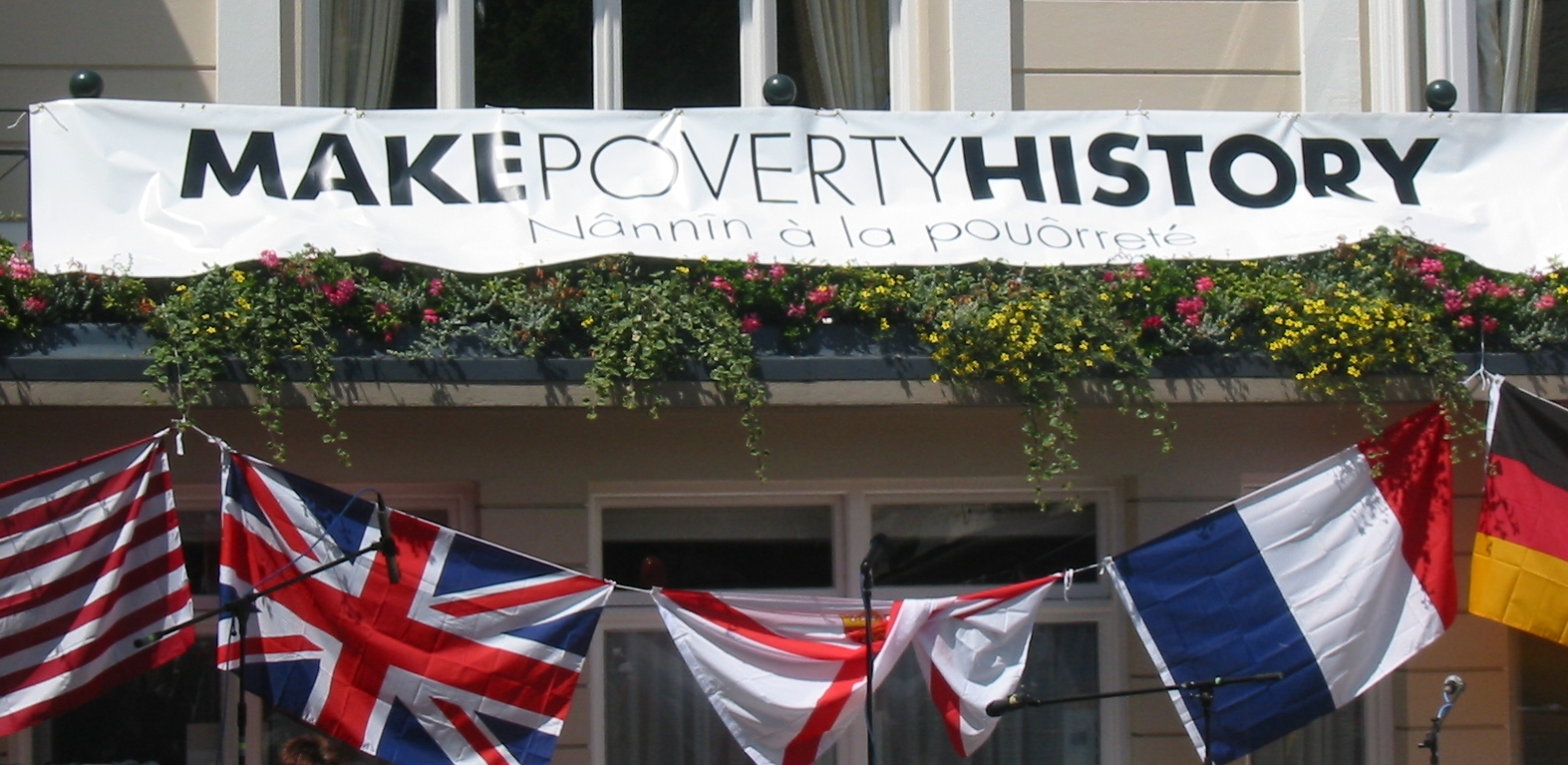
Bilingual banner for Make Poverty History, July 2005, reading Nânnîn à la pouôrreté (No to poverty)

Jèrriais	French	English
Jèrri	Jersey	Jersey
beinv'nu	bienvenue	welcome
bel	cour	garden (yard)
bieauté	beauté	beauty
bouônjour	bonjour	hello
braies	pantalon	trousers
brînge	brosse	brush
chièr	cher	dear
compather	comparer	compare
l'êtrangi	l'étranger	abroad
janmais	jamais	never
lian	lien	link
pouque	sac	bag
tchaîse	chaise	chair
tchian	chien	dog
ticl'ye	bouilloire	kettle
viages	voyages	journeys
yi	œil	eye

== See also ==
- Auregnais
- Culture of Jersey
- Sercquiais

== Literature ==
- Lé Jèrriais Pour Tous by Paul W. Birt, 1985.
- Dictionnaire Jersiais–Français, 1966.
- A Grammar of the Norman French of the Channel Islands: The Dialects of Jersey and Sark by Anthony J. Liddicoat, 1994. ISBN 978-3-11-087728-1
- Jersey Norman French: A Linguistic Study of An Obsolescent Dialect . Mari C. Jones, 2001
- Jèrriais: Jersey's Native Tongue by Mari C. Jones, 2003. ISBN 978-1-904210-03-0
- Dictionnaithe Jèrriais-Angliais. 2005. ISBN 0-901897-40-X
- Les Chroniques du Don Balleine/Les Nouvelles Chroniques du Don Balleine (magazine). Jersey 1979 – current.
