= Edwin John Luce =

Jersey writer

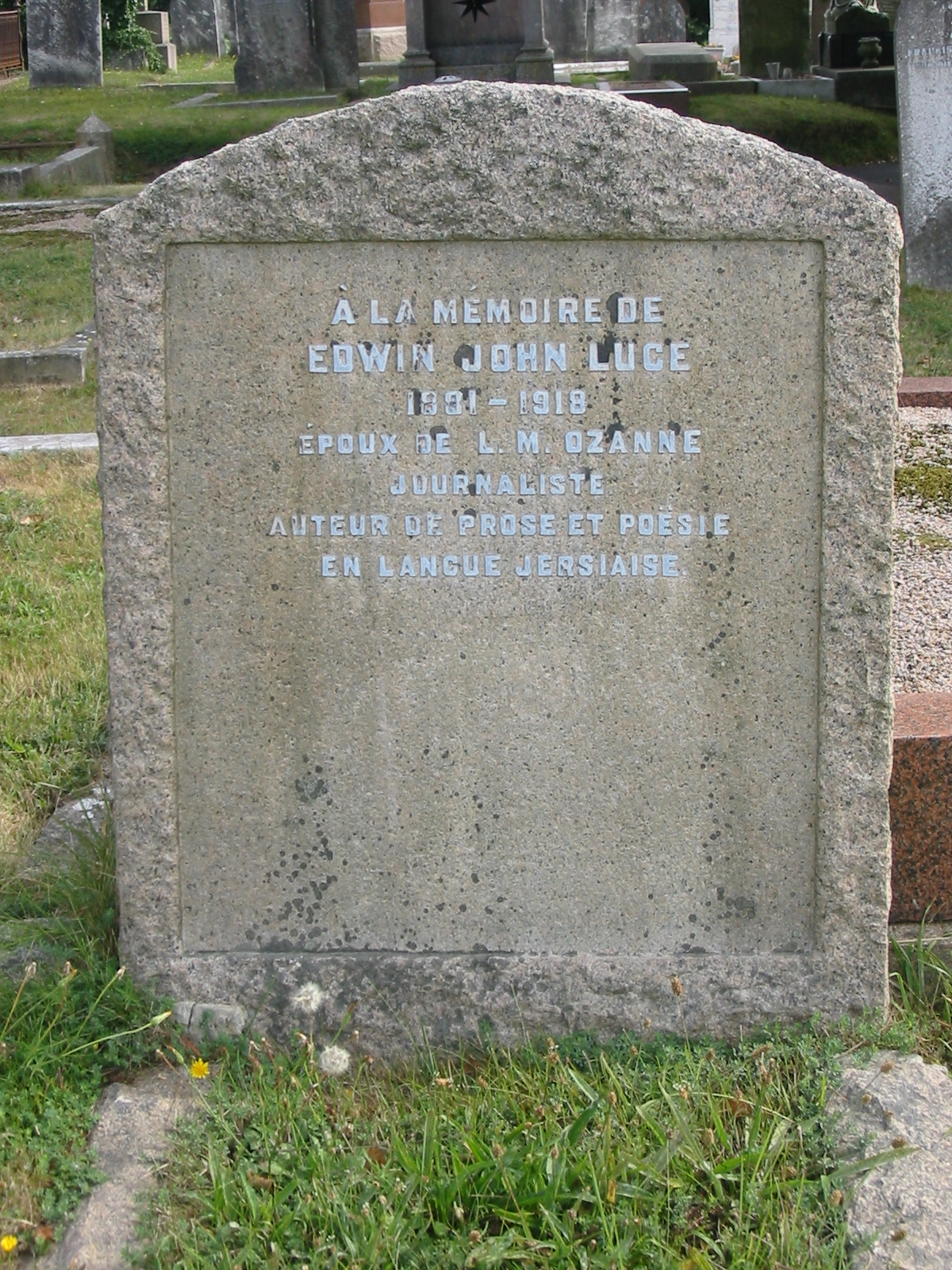
E.J. Luce's gravestone in St. Helier's Almorah cemetery describes him in French as "auteur de prose et poësie en langue jersiaise" ("author of prose and poetry in the Jersey language")

Edwin John Luce (1881 in Saint Lawrence, Jersey – 1918) was a writer and journalist in Jèrriais, the Norman language of Jersey. He was known to his friends as Jock Luce, and wrote under the pen name of Élie.

E. J. Luce reported on many matters in the États de Jersey, on the Royal Court, on the Magistrate's Court and the Parish Assemblies. As an editor for Nouvelle Chronique as well as Chroniques de Jersey, he wrote on the events of the day.

From 1900 his poetry in Jèrriais appeared in the almanacs of the Nouvelle Chronique de Jersey. He was a man of extraordinary qualities and a gifted writer in English, French and Jèrriais, who also possessed a remarkable understanding of human nature. His prose and poetry aroused the admiration of other writers in the dialect of Jersey and those who claim that the dialect has neither grammar nor orthography will be convinced otherwise by reading his work.

He was the brother of Philippe William Luce.
