= List of people from Jersey =

This is a list of notable people who were born in the Channel Island of Jersey, or have been resident there, including current Jersey residents.

Some persons may not be listed here, but are listed in other related articles, shown under the See also section.

All those listed should have an article dedicated to them.

== Actors ==
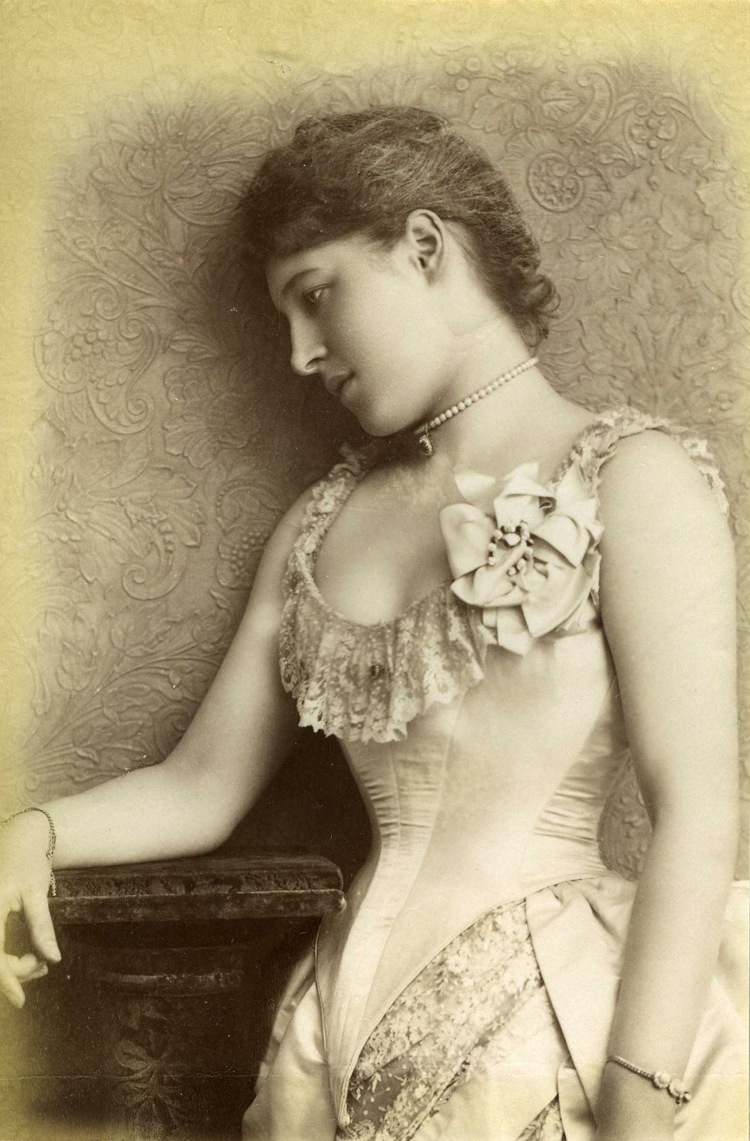
Lillie Langtry

- Henry Cavill (born 1983), actor
- Anthony Faramus (1920–1990), actor and author
- Seymour Hicks (1871–1949), actor
- Tonicha Jeronimo (born 1977), English actress
- Jonny Labey (born 1993), actor
- Lillie Langtry (1853–1929), actress
- Sylvestra Le Touzel (born 1958), actor
- Ivy St. Helier (1886–1971), actress
- Will Smith (born 1971), British comedian, actor and writer
- Alma Stanley (1854–1931), actress,

== Artists ==
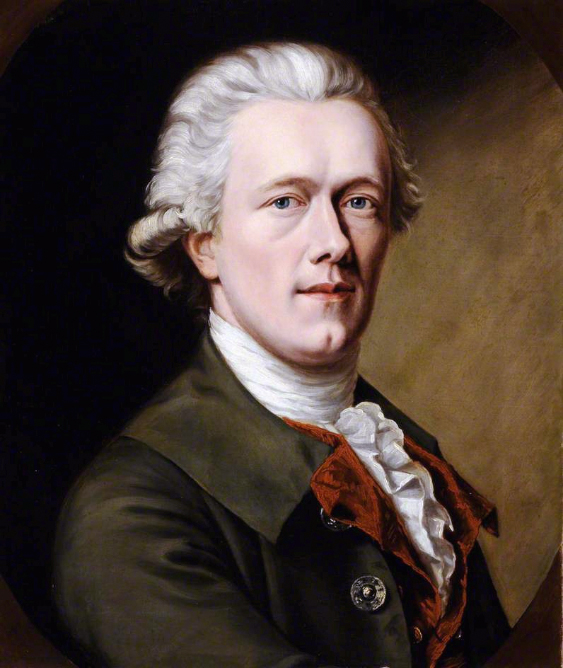
Philip Jean

- Edmund Blampied (1886–1966), artist
- Claude Cahun (1894–1954), artist
- Philip Jean (1755–1802), painter
- John St Helier Lander (1868–1944), portrait painter
- John Le Capelain (1812–1848), painter
- Jason Martin (born 1970), painter
- John Everett Millais (1829–1896), painter
- Marcel Moore (1892–1972), illustrator and photographer
- Caroline Osborne, Duchess of Leeds (1931–2005)
- Walter William Ouless RA (1848–1933), painter
- Charles H. Poingdestre (1825–1905), painter
- Reginald Hector Whistler (1905–1978), artist

== Business people ==
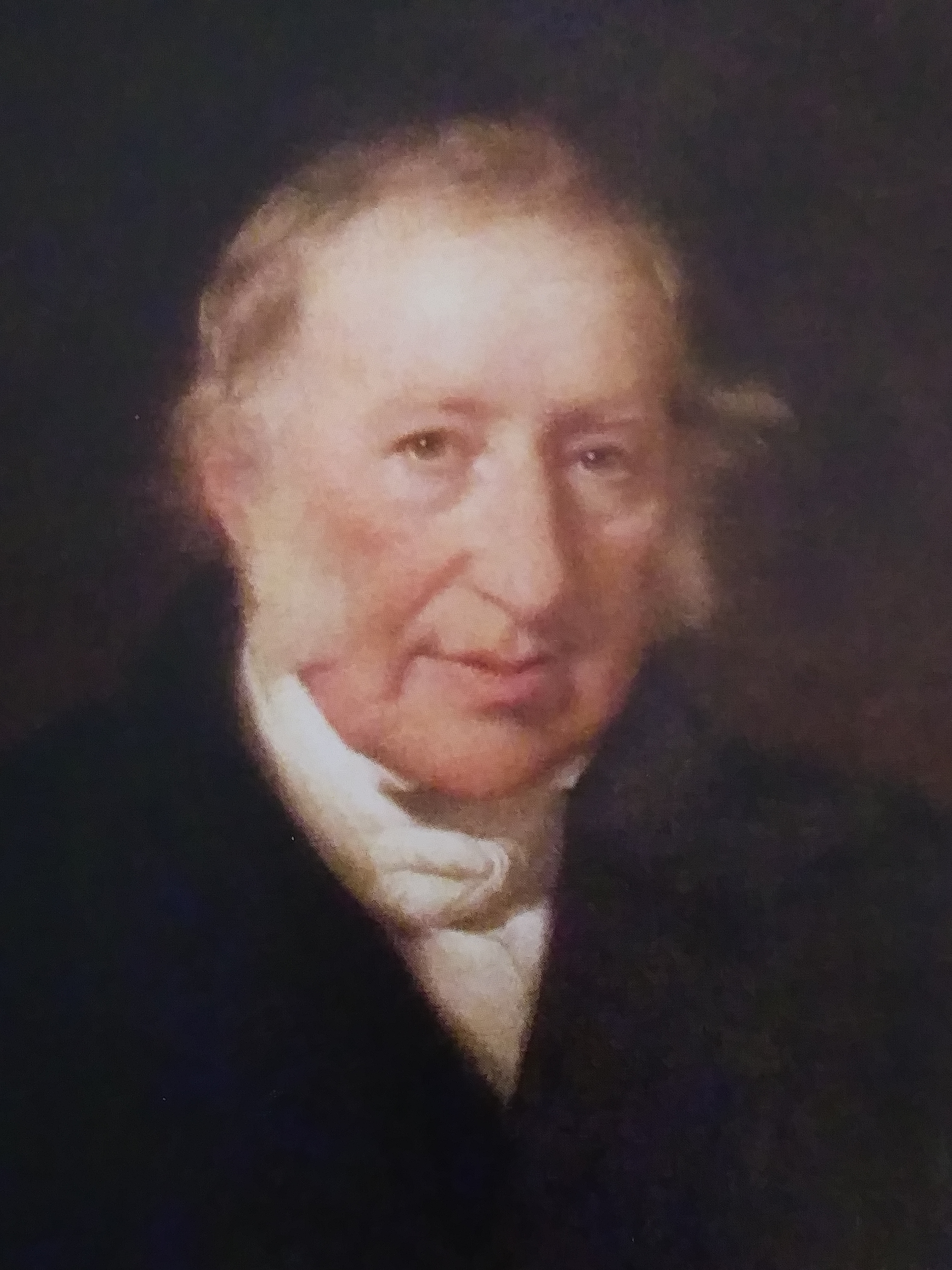
Charles Robin

- Billy Butlin (1899–1980), holiday camp empire, moved to Jersey in 1972
- David Kirch (born 1936), property developer, collector and philanthropist
- Jean Martell (1694–1753), Jersey-born founder of cognac manufacturer Martell and responsible for establishing brandy trade routes with Guernsey
- Simon Nixon (born 1967), founder of Moneysupermarket.com, moved to Jersey in 2013
- Charles Robin (1743–1824), developed, with brother John, the fishery in the Canadian maritime region
- Jack Walker (1929–2000), British industrialist and businessman

== Criminals ==
- Francis Joseph Huchet (1927–1959), murderer, last criminal to be executed by hanging on the Channel Islands
- Edward Paisnel (1925–1994), sex offender

== Musicians ==
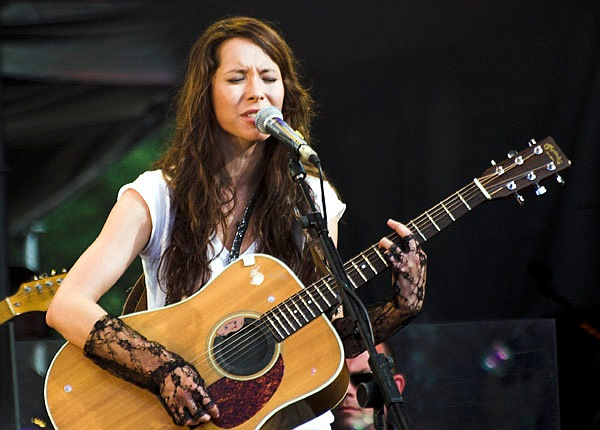
Nerina Pallot

- Dave Adams (1938–2016), musician
- Andy Chatterley (born 1973), record producer, songwriter
- John Wort Hannam, folk musician
- Guru Josh (1964–2015), house musician
- Gerard Le Feuvre (born 1962), cellist
- Steve Lodder (born 1951), keyboardist, composer and organist
- Gilbert O'Sullivan (born 1946), singer-songwriter
- Nerina Pallot (born 1974), singer-songwriter
- Kevin Porée (born 1965), record producer, musician

== Rulers, politicians, soldiers ==
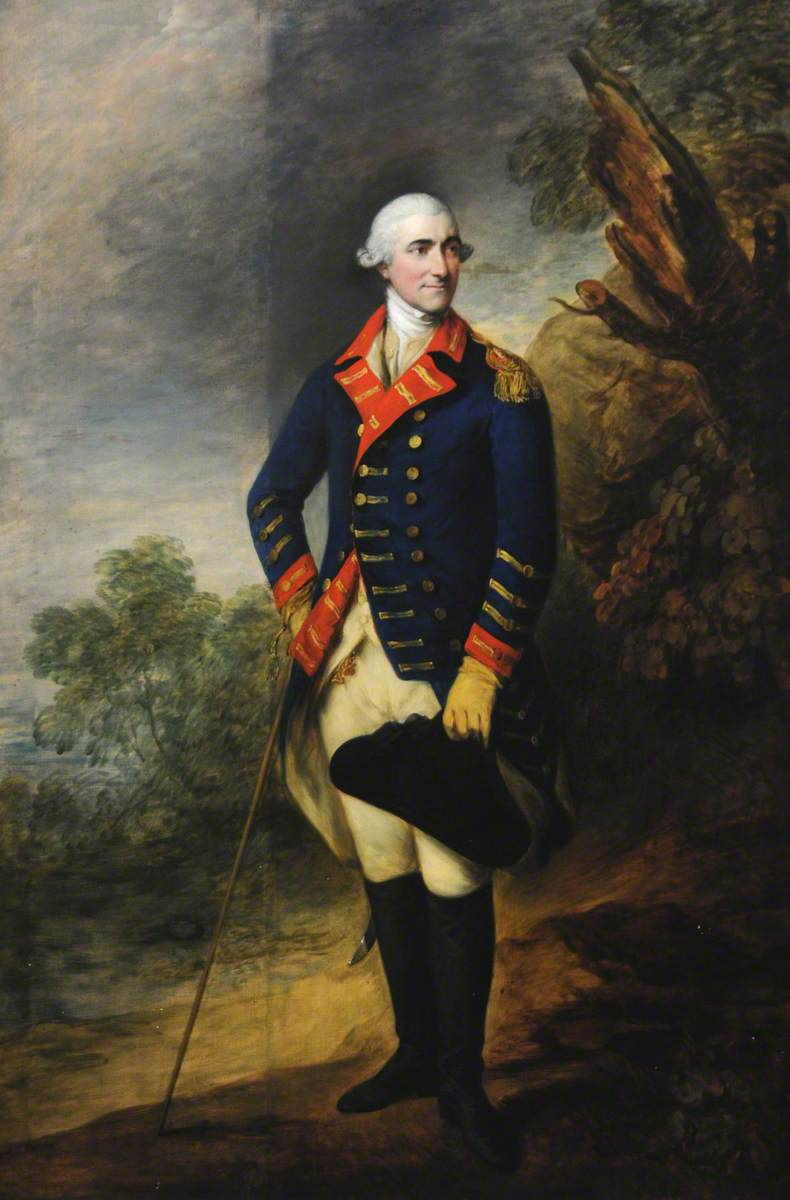
Henry Seymour Conway, 1780

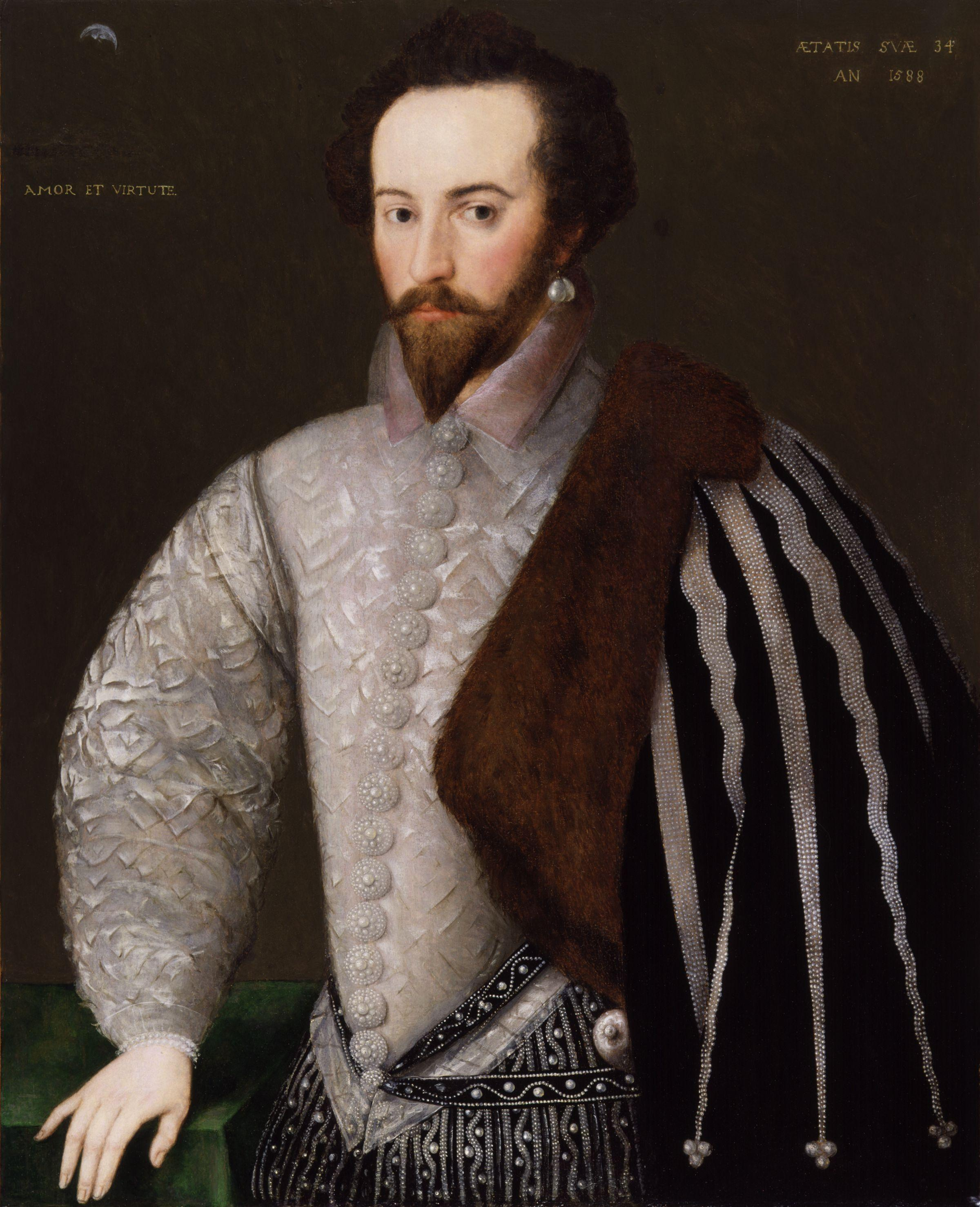
Sir Walter Raleigh, governor of Jersey, 1600 to 1603

- Fleur Anderson (born 1971), British Labour politician
- Francis George Atkinson (1874–1902), First District officer in Jesselton, British North Borneo
- John George Bourinot (1814–1884), merchant and politician in Nova Scotia
- William Bruce (1890–1914), Lieutenant, VC
- Cecil Burney (1858–1929), Admiral of the Fleet
- George Carteret (1610–1680), vice-admiral, royalist statesman
- Henry Seymour Conway (1721–1795), British general, statesman in England and governor of Jersey,
- Philippe d'Auvergne (1754–1816), British vice admiral, spymaster and Duc de Bouillon
- Renaud De Carteret III (1129–1169), land-owner
- Bertram Falle, 1st Baron Portsea (1859–1948), politician, barrister
- Lyndon Farnham, chief minister of Jersey
- Geraint Jennings (born 1966), linguist, politician
- Wilfred Krichefski (1916–1974), Orthodox Jew, senator and television executive
- Norman Le Brocq (1922–1996), communist politician, trade unionist and leading figure in the local resistance to the German occupation
- Timothy Le Cocq (born 1956), Bailiff
- Augustus Asplet Le Gros (1840–1887), politician, writer
- Cyril Le Marquand (1902–1980), politician
- John Le Marquand (1912–2008), politician
- Isaac LeVesconte (1822–1879), Nova Scotia businessman and politician
- Robert MacRae (born 1968), bailiff
- Sam Mézec (born 1990), politician
- Sarah Pallett, member of the New Zealand Parliament
- Walter Raleigh (1553–1618), governor from 1600 to 1603
- William Villiers, 10th Earl of Jersey (born 1976), peer, film producer
- Roger Walden (died 1406), English treasurer and church figure

== Scientists ==
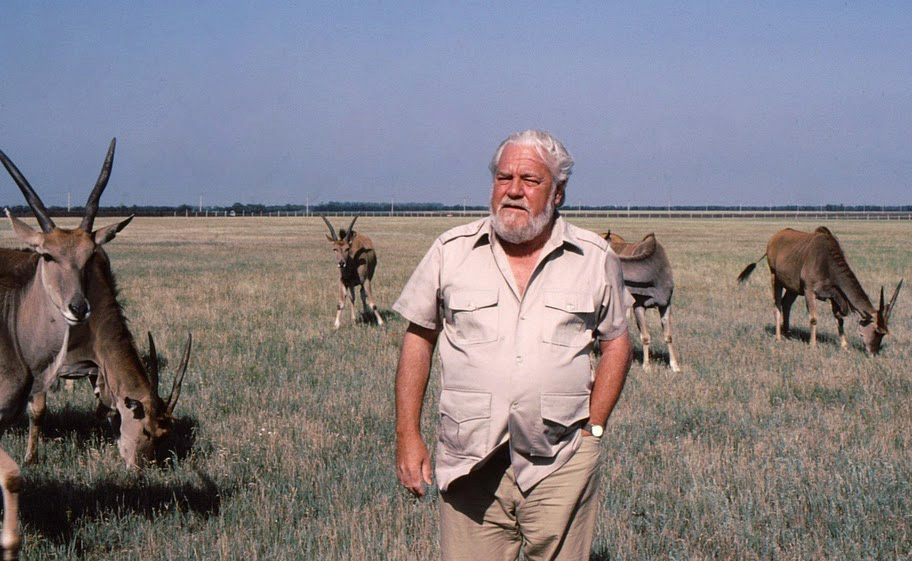
Gerald Durrell, in Askania-Nova

- Gerald Durrell (1925–1995), naturalist, author
- Lee McGeorge Durrell (born 1949), naturalist, author
- Steve A. Kay, chronobiologist
- Robert Le Rossignol (1884–1976), chemist
- Robert Ranulph Marett (1866–1943), ethnologist, son of Robert Pipon Marett
- Arthur Mourant (1904–1994), haematologist

== Sports people ==
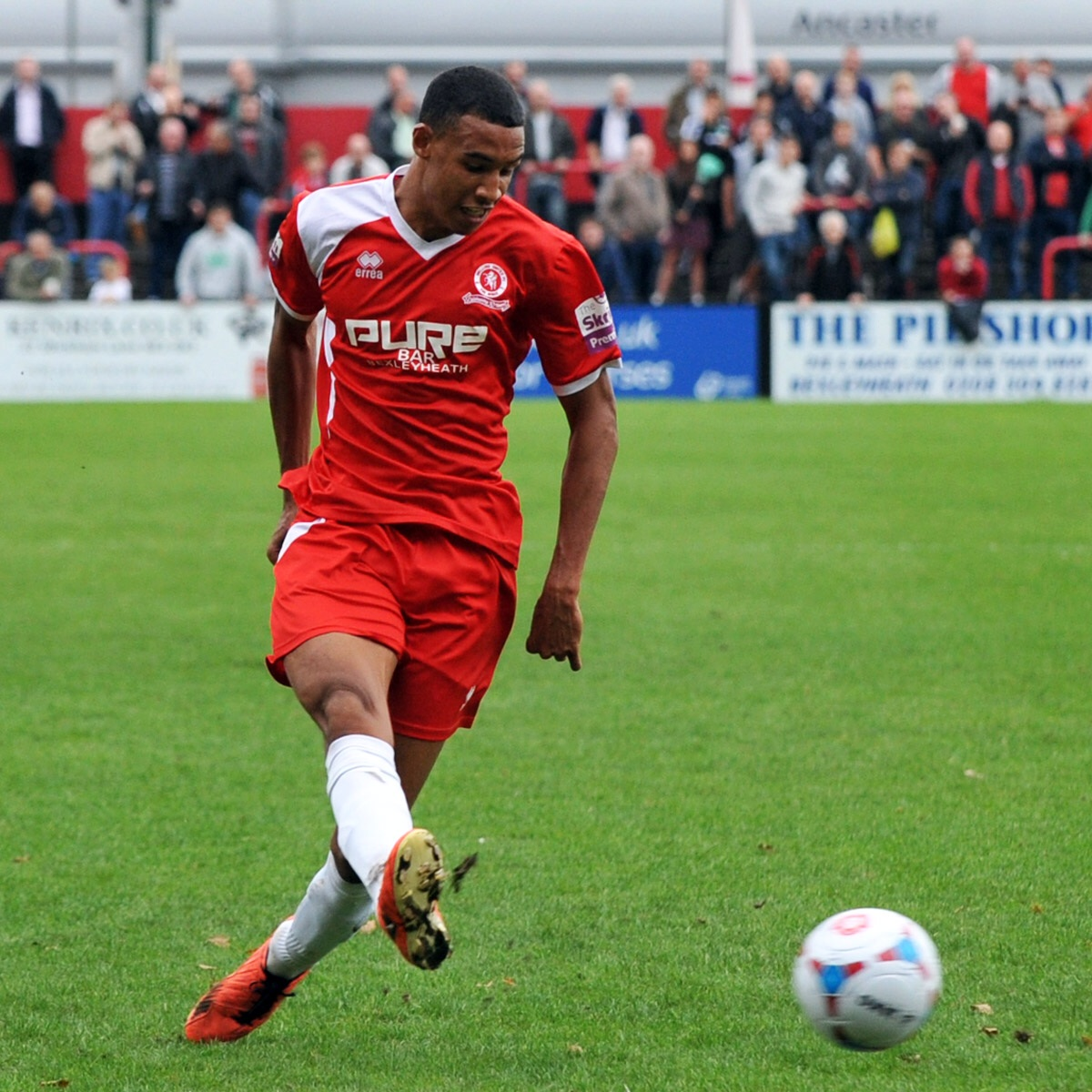
Kurtis Guthrie

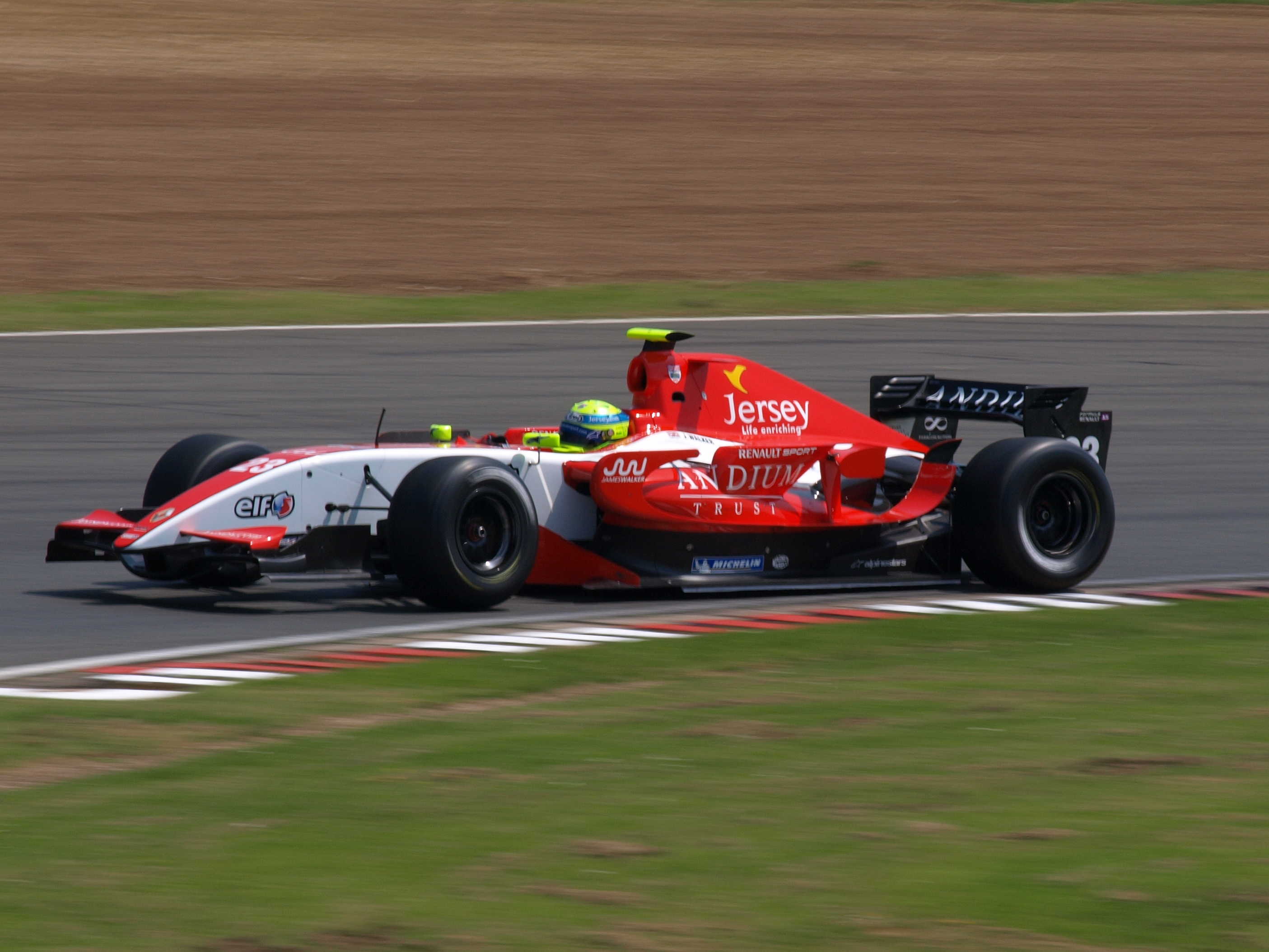
James Walker

- Mariana Agathangelou (born 1988), badminton player
- Matt Banahan (born 1986), rugby player
- Karina Bisson (born 1966), lawn bowler
- Alex Buesnel (born 1992), disabled gymnast
- Daryl Clare (born 1978), footballer
- Malcolm De Sousa (born 1991), lawn bowler
- Suzie Dingle (born 1958), lawn bowler
- Nathan Frazer (born 1998), professional wrestler
- Phil Gaudin (born 1879), professional golfer
- Albert Geary (1900–1989), cricketer
- Christine Grimes (born 1950), lawn bowler
- Kurtis Guthrie (born 1993), footballer
- Serena Guthrie (born 1990), netballer
- Chris Hamon (born 1970), footballer
- Dave Huson (born 1951), footballer
- Chris Jones (born 1956), footballer
- Simon Laurens (born 1967), equestrian
- Michael Le Bourgeois (born 1990), rugby player
- Graeme Le Saux (born 1968), football player
- Fred Leamon (1919–1981), footballer
- Nigel Mansell (born 1953), racing driver
- Gean O'Neil (1951–2018), lawn bowler
- Robert Osborne-Smith (1908–1972), cricketer
- Brett Pitman (born 1988), football player
- Ted Ray (1877–1943), professional golfer
- Thomas Renouf (1878–1955), professional golfer
- Scott Ruderham (born 1988), lawn bowler
- George Scoones (born 1886), footballer
- Lauryn Therin (born 1986), track cyclist
- Peter Tregloan (born 1957), powerlifter
- Asa Tribe (born 2004), cricketer
- Harry Vardon (1870–1937), professional golfer
- Peter Vincenti (born 1986), footballer
- Geoff Vowden (born 1941), footballer
- James Walker (born 1983), racing driver
- Derek Warwick (born 1954), racing driver
- Claire Wilson (born 1985), runner

== Television and media personalities ==
- Eric Blakeley (born 1965), TV presenter
- Gary Burgess (1975–2022), TV and radio presenter
- ChrisMD (born 1996), YouTuber
- Alan Whicker (1921–2013), TV presenter

== Writers ==
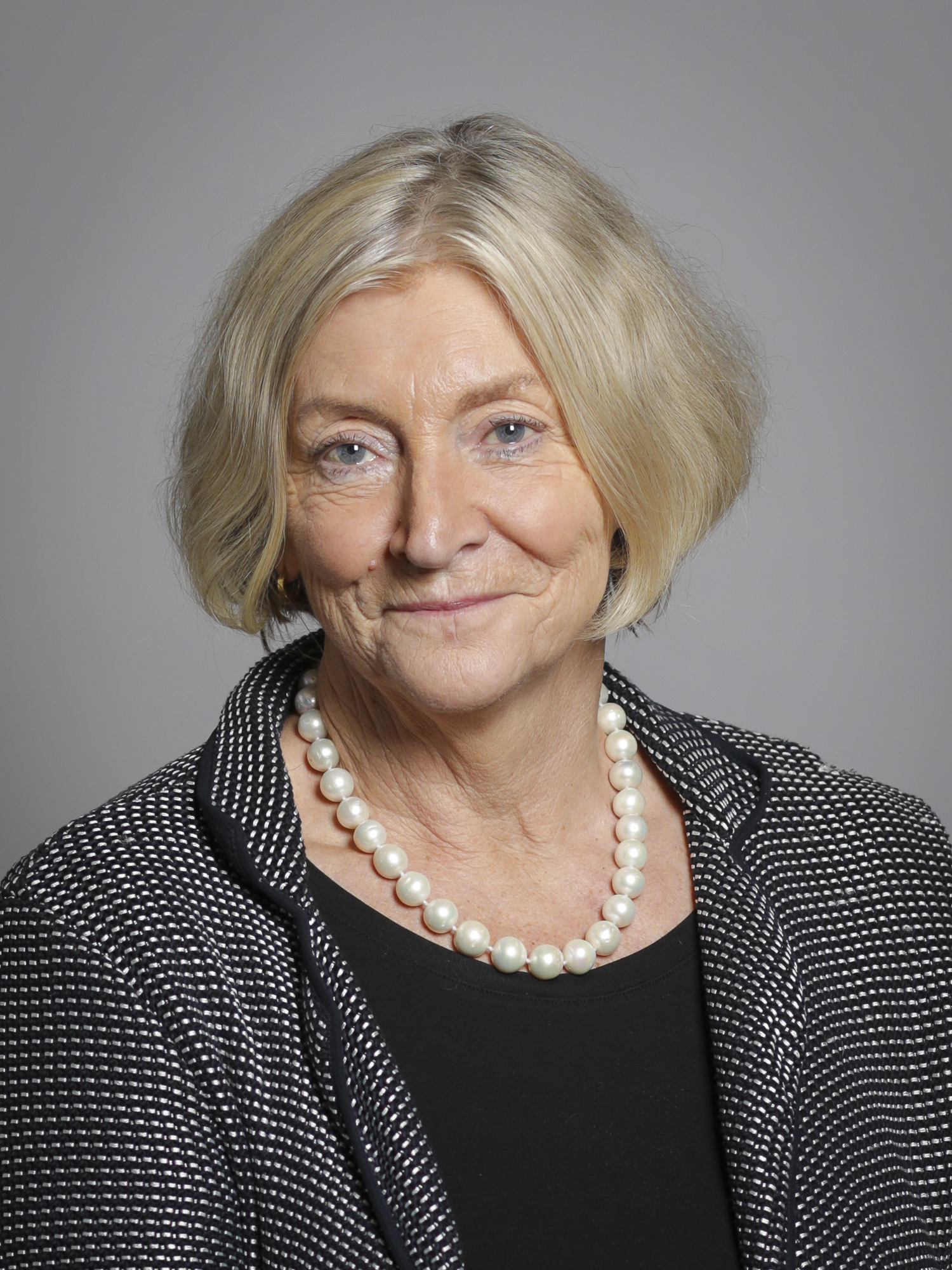
Rosie Boycott, Baroness Boycott, 2019

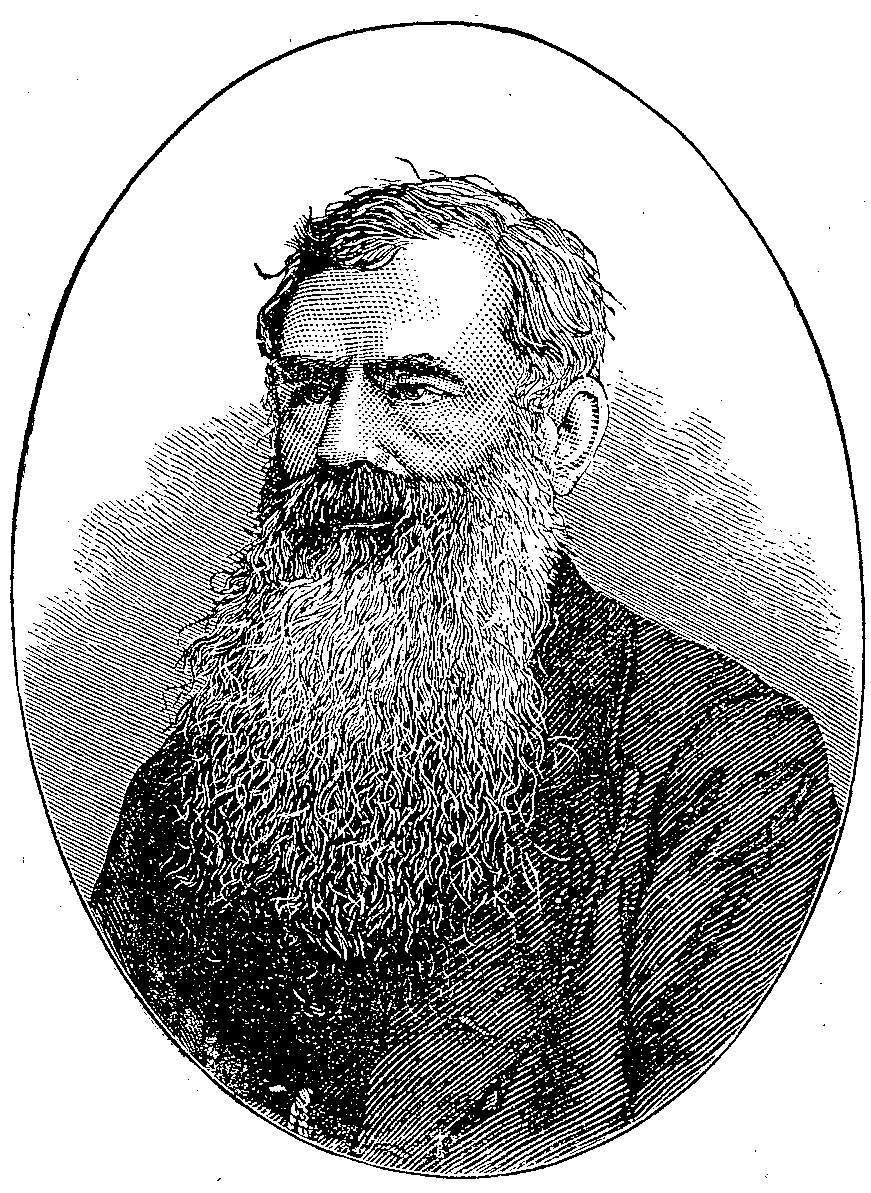
Sir Robert Pipon Marett

- Simon Boas (1977–2024), humanitarian and writer
- Rosie Boycott, Baroness Boycott (born 1951), journalist and feminist
- Daniel Brevint (1616–1695), author and clergyman
- Gary Burgess (1975–2022), journalist
- Babette Cole (1950–2017), children's writer and illustrator
- George William de Carteret (1869–1940), journalist and writer
- Jean Dorey (1831–1872), Norman language writer
- Roger Drew (born 1971), screenwriter
- Gerald Durrell (1925–1995), conservationist, author
- Elinor Glyn (1864–1943), novelist, scriptwriter
- John Guzzwell (1930–2024), yachtsman, writer
- Sir William Haley (1901–1987), newspaper editor and broadcasting administrator
- Victor Hugo (1802–1885), exiled in Jersey
- John Conroy Hutcheson (1840–1897), author
- Frederick Lonsdale (1881–1954), dramatist
- Robert Marett (1907–1981), British author and diplomat
- Robert Pipon Marett (1820–1884), lawyer, journalist, poet, politician
- Harry Patterson (1929–2022), author
- Amélia Perchard (1921–2012), Jèrriais-language writer
- Jeremy Reed (born 1951), poet, novelist, biographer and literary critic
- William Rose (1918–1987), American screenwriter
- Wace (1100–1174), medieval author

== Other notables ==
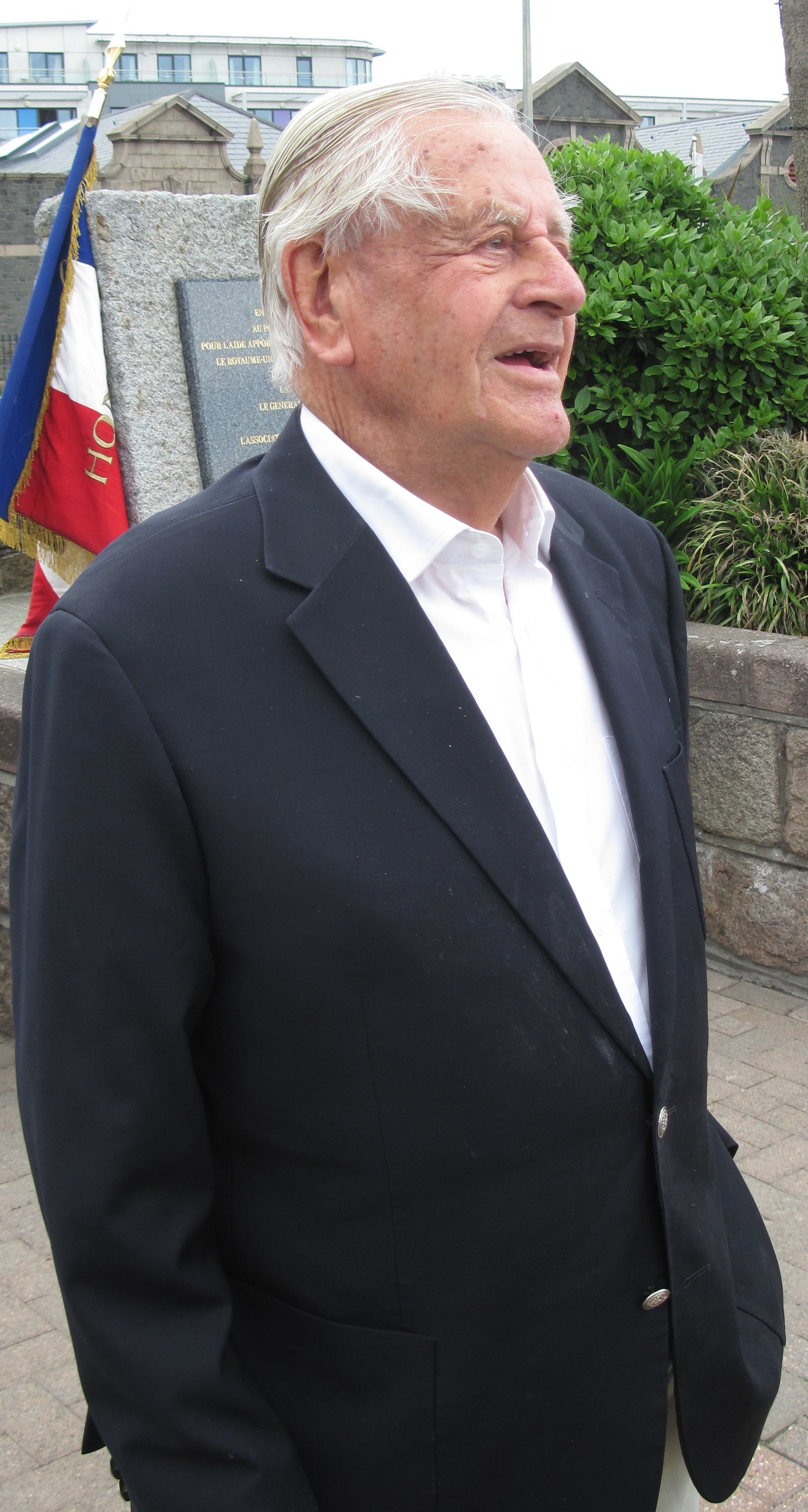
Bob Le Sueur

- Edward Bartley (1839–1919), architect
- Philip Carteret (1733–1796), British naval officer and explorer
- Eddie Chapman (1914–1997), double agent
- Daniel Dumaresq (1712–1805), Anglican priest and educational consultant to Russia and Poland
- Anthony Faramus (1920–1990), prisoner of war, actor
- Duncan Gibbons (1952–1993), film and music video director
- Louisa Gould (1891–1945), World War II resistance who assisted Russian prisoners in Jersey
- Norman Le Brocq (1922–1996), World War II resistance leader, and Deputy
- Alphonse Le Gastelois (1914–2012), hermit
- Bob Le Sueur (1920–2022), during World War II assisted Russian prisoners of war in Jersey
- Caroline LeSueur (1814–1898), Mormon pioneer
- Thomas Pullinger (1867–1945), automobile engineer
- Marguerite Stocker (1901–1992), engineering apprentice in World War I, governor of HM Prison Askham Grange 1959–1967
- Melvina Walker (born 1874), working class activist and suffragette

== See also ==
- Lieutenant Governor of Jersey
- Bailiff of Jersey
- Sport in Jersey
- List of politicians in Jersey
- List of people from Guernsey
