= John Guzzwell =

Yachtsman

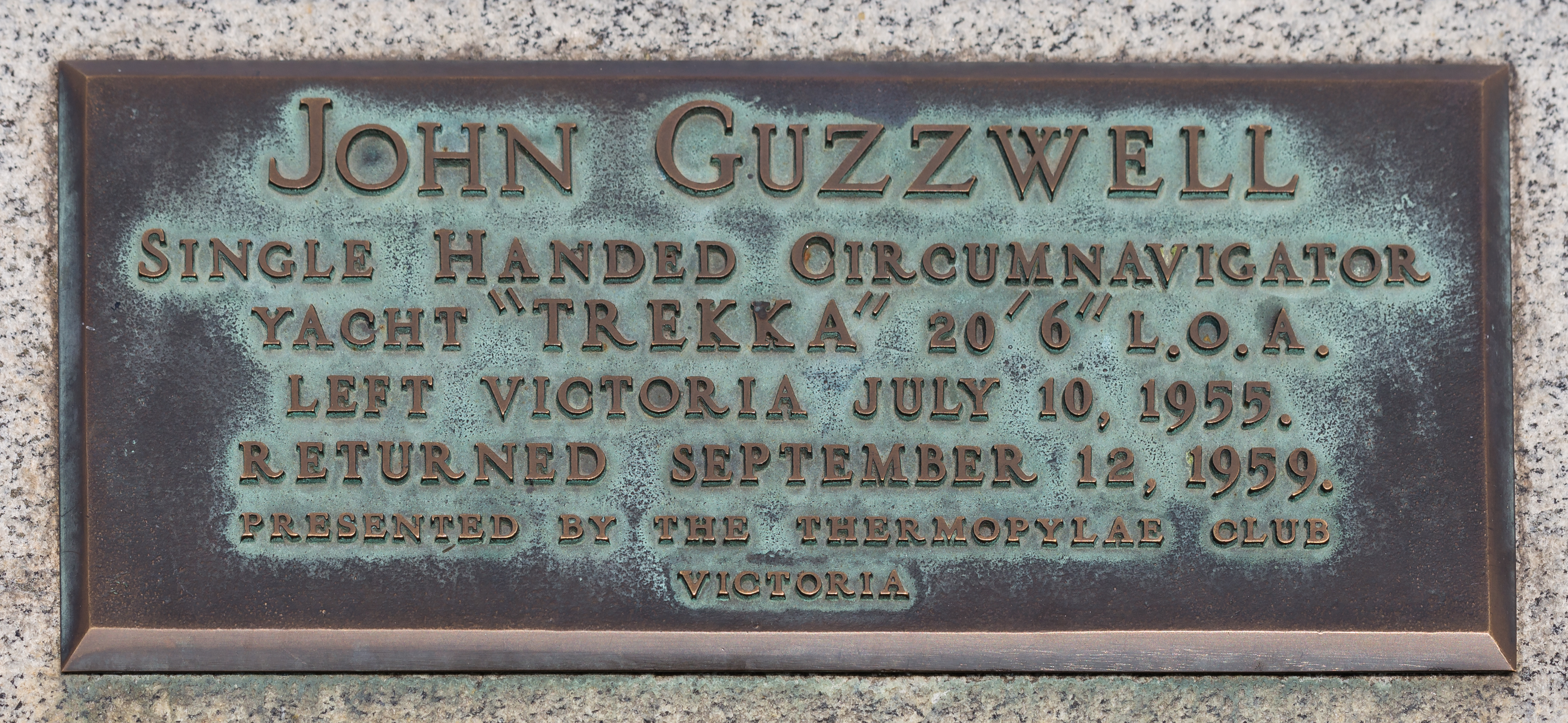
- John Guzzwell plaque
- Born: 1930; England
- Died: 23 August 2024 (aged 93–94); Poulsbo, Washington
- Known for: Sailing round the world single-handed in the smallest yacht
- Spouse(s): Maureen; Dorothy
- Children: 2

John Guzzwell (1930 - 23 August 2024) was a yachtsman who circumnavigated the world single-handed from 1955-1959 in a 20 ft 6in (6.25m) wooden yawl named Trekka that he built in a shed behind a fish and chip shop in Victoria, British Columbia. Trekka held the record for the smallest yacht to complete a circumnavigation until 1987 when Serge Testa broke the record in his 11-foot-10-inch (3.61 m) boat, the Acrohc Australis. Guzzwell was also a renowned timber shipwright.

In 1959 he was awarded the Cruising Club of America's Blue Water Medal to recognize his achievement.

== Early life and education ==
John Guzzwel was born in 1930 in Southampton, England, but was brought up in Jersey, Channel Islands, the son of a sea captain. Early in the German Occupation of the Channel Islands he was interned in a prisoner-of-war camp where his father taught him celestial navigation.

After the war he trained as an apprentice joiner and shipwright before emigrating to British Columbia in 1953.

== Circumnavigation ==
On 10 September 1955, the 25-year-old Guzzwell departed from Victoria aboard Trekka and sailed via San Francisco to the South Pacific Islands, rounding the Cape of Good Hope into the Atlantic Ocean and then through the Panama Canal back into the Pacific Ocean, returning to Victoria on 12 September 1959 having sailed 33,000 nautical miles (61,116 kilometres), navigating by sextant. Trekka became the smallest vessel to circumnavigate the globe.

== Trekka ==
When Guzzwell was 22 he built Trekka in his spare time, using a design from the English naval architect John Laurent Giles that was based on Sopranino, a 1950 ultralight sailing yacht. Guzzwell asked Giles to strengthen the design and use a yawl rig. Guzzwell laid her keel and then clamped and glued the hull in the boiler room of the local YMCA. He completed her construction in a storeroom at the back of Johnny Bell's Fish and Chip Shop on View street. He launched her in August 1954.

According to Practical Boat Owner magazine, "Trekka's light-displacement hull was many years ahead of its time. She was exquisitely built, with fine dovetail joints and a beautiful interior, with the varnished red-cedar planks offset by white-painted frames and stringers, and varnished spruce masts." Rather than an inboard diesel engine, she carried a four horsepower outboard engine together with four gallons of fuel kept in a locker.

After his circumnavigation, Guzzwell sailed Trekka to Hawaii where she was sold. After two further owners, she was bought by the Thermopylae Club of Victoria and sailed single-handed back to Victoria by Eric Abranovich, a journey of 3,500 miles taking about 50 days. Guzzwell was present to witness her return.

== Boatbuilding ==
In the early 1960s, he built the 45 ft (13.7m) cutter, Treasure, aboard which he and his family voyaged widely. In the mid-1990s, he built the 30 ft (9.1m) fractionally-rigged cold-molded sloop, Endangered Species.

== Yacht racing ==
While aged 68, he raced Endangered Species in the 1998 singlehanded Transpacific Yacht Races from San Francisco to Hawaii, taking part again in 2002.

He was the patron of the Mini Globe Race, in which a fleet of 19 ft (5.8m) plywood/epoxy, Class Globe 580 yachts will race around the world, along a similar route to Trekka's.

== Writing ==
In 1960 he wrote a book about his circumnavigation, Trekka Round the World (ISBN ISBN 9780938665564), which he updated in 1999 to include an epilogue of anecdotes and photographs such as competing in the 1998 Single TransPac Race on his yacht Endangered Species.

In 1979 he wrote a technical book, Modern Wood Yacht Construction: Cold-molding, Joinery, Fitting Out (ISBN ISBN 9780370302645).

== Death ==
He died on 23 August 2024, age 94 at his home in Poulsbo, Washington.
