= Anthony Faramus =

British author and concentration camp survivor (1920–1990)

Journey into Darkness, an autobiographical account of Anthony Faramus's wartime experiences

Anthony Charles Faramus (27 July 1920 – 4 August 1990) was an actor, author and hairdresser. He was born in Saint Peter, Jersey, and died in Surrey. The autobiographical accounts of his survival of Fort de Romainville, Buchenwald and the Mauthausen-Gusen concentration camp complex were published as The Faramus Story in 1954 and Journey into Darkness in 1990. Two books about Agent Zigzag, the double agent Eddie Chapman, also document aspects of Faramus's 'ruse' to join the Nazis as a collaborator and a spy, his imprisonment in Jersey, Paris and the concentration camps.

== Arrest ==
Faramus worked as a hairdresser in a Saint Helier salon and later, during the early stages of the German occupation of the Channel Islands, was employed in the kitchen of the Miramar Hotel. In the spring of 1940 he attempted to join the Royal Air Force but was not accepted. Faramus was also a petty criminal and in December 1940, at the age of 20, he received a 6-month prison sentence for obtaining £9 under false pretences. Faramus was incarcerated in H.M. Prison Jersey, sharing a cell with Eddie Chapman, who later described Faramus as "a hopeless crook".

Under the conditions of military occupation, the administration of civil law and order was subject to the dictates of the German authorities. As at the time of his arrest Faramus had in his possession an anti-Nazi leaflet, the German authorities added 1 month to his sentence. Faramus names Centenier Arthur Tostevin, an Honorary Police officer of Saint Helier and Detective Constable Benjamin Shenton as the officials who had allegedly informed the Germans about the leaflet.

Faramus and Chapman quickly struck up a friendship while in prison. They arranged to meet after they were released and subsequently shared a flat. For a short period they ran a barber's shop together. Their customers included civilians and German soldiers alike. The shop also served as a useful front for the black market activities of another of Faramus's criminal associates, Douglas Stirling.

== Deported ==
In late 1941 Chapman hatched a plan to get himself, Faramus and Stirling off the island. The plan was simple: they would turn traitor and offer to work as spies for the Nazis. Stirling was the most enthusiastic, whilst Faramus was cautious of the risks of becoming an open collaborator but agreed to follow the plan. Chapman and Faramus composed a letter in German, offering their services as German spies, which they sent to the German command post in St Helier, addressed to General Otto von Stülpnagel, the officer in command of occupational forces in France and the Channel Islands.

Late one night in November 1941 Chapman and Faramus were summoned by the Germans but they were not being recruited, they were being arrested. Their plan to join and work for the Nazis backfired spectacularly, since the pair were taken to mainland France and thence by rail to Fort de Romainville in Paris where they worked, stole rations and fuel and made a key to enter the women's section of the prison. After a year Faramus, along with other prisoners from Romainville, was taken in terrible conditions by train via Compiègne to the Buchenwald concentration camp near Weimar, Germany. Of the 120 in his carriage 55 died en route from suffocation, dysentery and thirst.

Anthony Faramus is on the right of the photo, prisoner (E)42324. Buchenwald. August 1944.

In chapter 7 of Journey into Darkness, Faramus describes the crime for which he was taken out of Buchenwald and forced on a journey to Mauthausen via Leipzig, Dresden and Prague:

... a freezing cold morning, at my place of work — 'Kommando das Grab' (communal graves) — I had momentarily set aside my shovel to blow into my hands and fingers. I had not seen the approach of the SS Warrant Officer. Failing to acknowledge the man's presence and not coming to attention and removing my cap from my head until he had passed by was one crime, the interruption of my work without permission was another. I was punched and booted; worse, my number (E)42324 was noted in his book of reports.

The Nazi Party defined Mauthausen as Grade III. Its purpose was to punish "Incorrigible Political Enemies of the Reich" with extermination through labour. In Journey into Darkness Faramus acknowledges Captain Maurice Pertschuck who was murdered in Buchenwald in 1944, Christopher Burney and Lt Jack H. Taylor. In film footage gathered by the US Department of Defense after the 11th Armored Division of the 3rd US Army entered the camp on 5 May 1945, Lt Jack H. Taylor spoke about his capture and imprisonment and the conditions at Mauthausen. Faramus also mentions Pierre Serge Choumoff, a mathematician and engineer, imprisoned in Romainville and Mauthausen, who later investigated the Mauthausen-Gusen complex.

== Post-World War II ==
Anthony Faramus (left) photographed by Mark Gerson with front cover artwork (right) by Michael Ayrton for Faramus's first account of the concentration camps; The Faramus Story 1954.

For more than a year after the war Faramus lived in Paris as he searched for some of the women and men that he had known while imprisoned in Fort de Romainville. During this period he lost a lung following surgery for tuberculosis, which he had contracted during his imprisonment in Mauthausen. He returned to Britain and after a series of jobs in hotels and bars he found work as an extra in various films produced at Pinewood Studios.

Faramus emigrated to the United States with his wife, Mary, where they both had careers in the film industry. Faramus worked as an actor and played the roles of a British officer in The Colditz Story and a POW in King Rat. He also worked as Clark Gable's butler and chauffeur. After living in California, he and Mary moved back to Britain, living in London and later in Farnham, Surrey.

In the 1970s, he joined the Hunt Saboteurs Association an organisation whose aim is to disrupt blood sports using direct action tactics. In 1989 he was arrested at a hunt in Hampshire. He refused to be bound over to keep the peace in the sum of £500 and was sent to Winchester prison for a month. He described his experience to a fellow hunt saboteur as "worse than his time at Fort de Romainville: no officer at Winchester Prison ever called him Tony", it was always the impersonal Faramus.

An operation to remove his lung in the 1950s as a result of the TB contracted in the concentration camps led to his death in August 1990, aged 70. More than 100 people, including actors, hunt saboteurs and concentration camp survivors, attended his funeral at St Andrew's Church, Farnham. Dave Wetton, a founder of the Hunt Saboteurs Association in the 1960s, read a funeral address.
