= Atkinson Clock Tower =

Clock tower in Sabah, Malaysia

Atkinson Clock Tower Menara Jam Atkinson
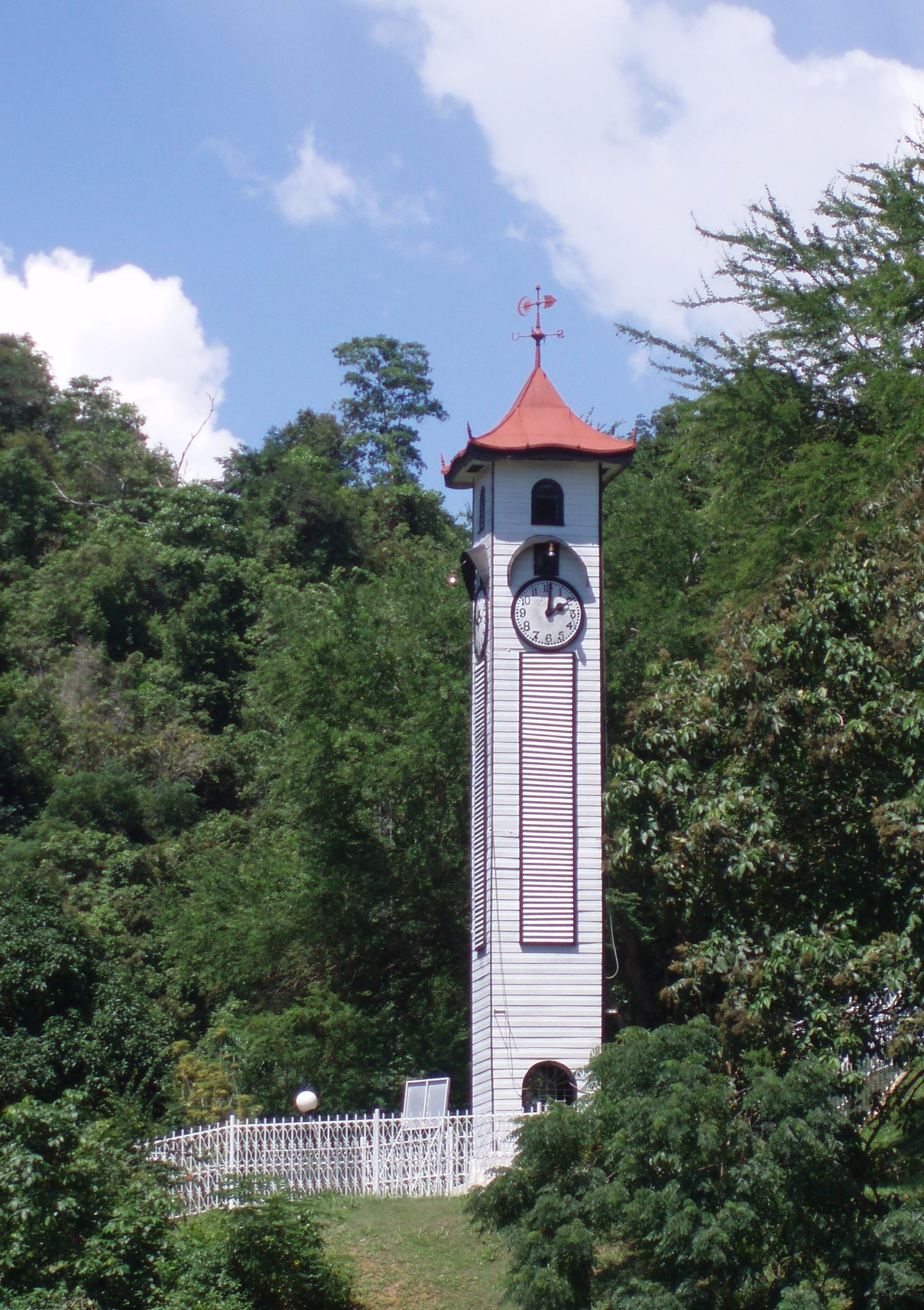
- One of the pre-World War II structures that still exists in Kota Kinabalu, Sabah
- Interactive map of Atkinson Clock Tower; Menara Jam Atkinson
- Location: Kota Kinabalu, Sabah, Malaysia
- Coordinates: 5°58′55.87″N 116°4′38.40″E
- Type: Clock tower
- Material: Wood
- Length: 6 ft (1.8 m)
- Width: 6 ft (1.8 m)
- Height: 50 ft (15 m)
- Completion date: 20 April 1905
- Dedicated to: Francis George Atkinson

The Atkinson Clock Tower (Malay: Menara Jam Atkinson) is the oldest standing structure in Kota Kinabalu. It was originally known as the Atkinson Memorial Clock Tower and sits in solitary on the bluff along Signal Hill Road overlooking this seaside city and capital of Sabah, Malaysia.

== History ==
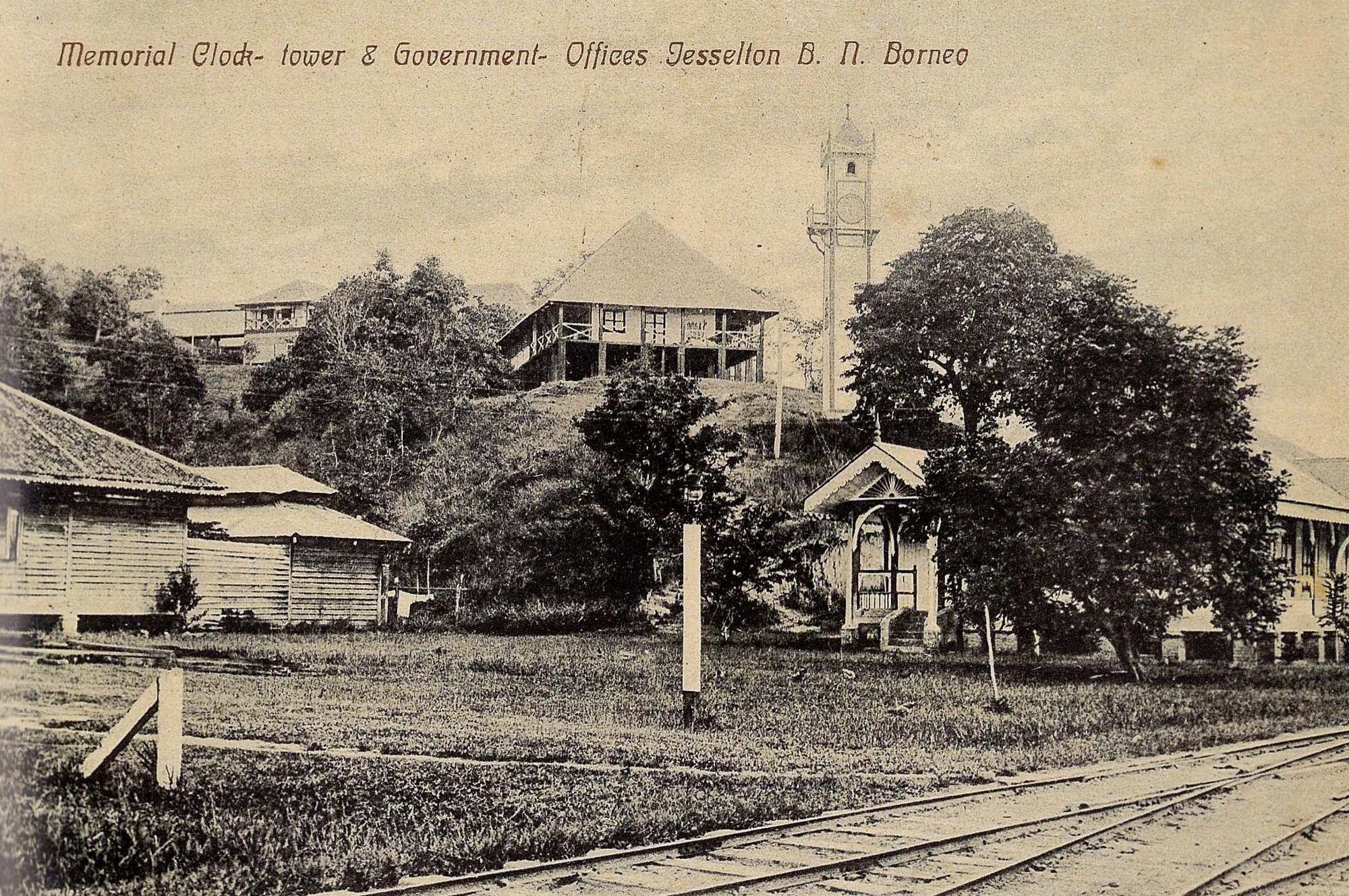
Atkinson Clock Tower, c. 1910.

The clock tower was built in the memory of Francis George Atkinson, Jesselton's first district officer who died of Malaria or ‘Borneo Fever’ at the age of 28 in December 1902. His mother Mrs Mary Edith Atkinson presented a two-faced clock to Jesselton town as a tribute to the memory of her son and it was decided later that a clock tower would be built in his honour. The structure was commissioned on 20 April 1905. A road was also named after him – Atkinson Drive, now renamed as Jalan Istana that links Tuaran Road over the ridge and downtown Kota Kinabalu.

The clock tower was originally built using Mirabau wood. Its construction was financed by Atkinson's friends and most probably built with additional funds channelled from shipwright of visiting naval vessels (the internal carpentry of the clock tower has all the hallmarks of a ship's carpenter). While still under construction the clock started working on 19 April 1905 and its chimes could be heard all over the town. The structure was finally completed in 1905. The clock was made by William Potts and Sons in Leeds, England. The company was established in 1883 and became the part of Smith of Derby Group in 1933. The UK office is now at 112 Alfreton Road, Derby.

Measuring 50 feet (15.24 metres) high x 6’3” x 6’3” at its base the clock tower stood from its lookout point on the hill facing towards the township of Jesselton. A weather vane with initials of the wind direction added a few more inches to the height of this elegant monument. Ships calling port at the wharf used the Atkinson Clock Tower as their navigation landmark, as it could be seen from the sea. The clock tower was illuminated at night and was used as a shipping landmark right up to the 1950s.

== Function ==
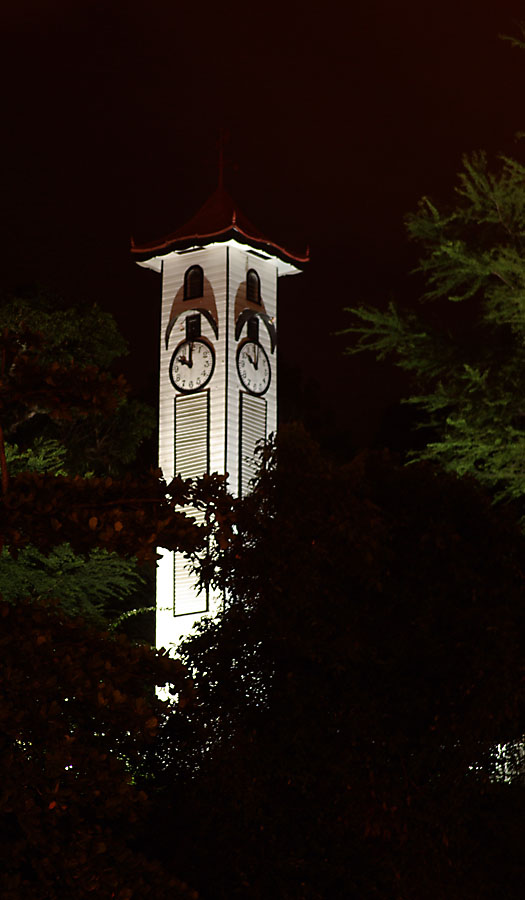
Atkinson Clock Tower seen at night.

It is hard to imagine how this relatively small but historical clock tower, standing on its own on this hill could ever be any ship's point of reference; after 105 years, the narrow strip of land in front of the tower has been extensively reclaimed, with tall commercial buildings blocking the views of the clock tower to the sea. But one has only to look at early photos of Jesselton township from its formation in the 1900s to present day to see how vital the clock tower was as a reference point – and still is – as a marker for the growth of this quaint former British Colony township known as 'Jesselton' into 'Kota Kinabalu' - the bustling modern Malaysian city that it is now.

Radio Sabah's broadcasting department used to be located near the clock tower in the 1950s and some old timers still remember the chimes over the radio before the BBC world news broadcast.

== Repair and renovation ==
Over the years, the clock tower underwent many transformations. Subsequent repairs and renovations have altered its appearance. Japanese machine-gun fire during World War 2 damaged the dial and cog of the clock tower's mechanisms. It was repaired by Yick Ming Watch Dealers of Kota Kinabalu who have continued to be the maintenance contractors until today, a practice passed down from father to son. Therefore, the story of this historical clock tower is intricately tied to the lives of generations of Sabahans who have lived in its vicinity over the past one hundred years.

The clock tower was extensively renovated and altered for Jesselton's Diamond Jubilee celebrations in 1959. Defective structural members caused by the tropical weather were substituted with other hardwoods, while the roof timbers were stripped and replaced. Its new facelift was completed on 7 November 1959. However, the brass plaque that was placed at the foot of the clock disappeared after the Jubilee renovations.

In 1961, the Atkinson Clock Tower's clock face was altered yet again. The dials of the clock were changed and the face replaced with translucent Perspex, with black figures on white background for internal lighting. But the building itself has remained intact in its exact location for more than a century.

== Gazetted ==
The clock tower is protected under the Sabah Cultural Heritage (Preservation) Enactment 1997 and its Antiquities and Treasure Trove Enactment 1977; with its site was gazetted in 1983. In May 2012, the clock tower was repaired again. The Daily Express made a complaint in July 2016 on the clock tower malfunction; which were responded by Sabah Museum to repair it. On 23 February 2018, it is one of 24 heritage sites in the state that were gazetted by Sabah's State Heritage Council under new enactment of "State Heritage Enactment 2017".

== Issues ==
=== Impact from proposed development ===
In 2011, it was reported that developers intend to use the land located closely to the clock tower for malls development; leading to a protest by various heritage protectors and non-governmental organisations (NGOs) as the structures would completely overshadow the historical tower. This resulted the plan being shelved. However the plan was returned in mid-2017 when the Sabah state government gave permission to the developer with a proposal to relocate the clock tower to a new site. Kota Kinabalu City Hall (DBKK) have stressed that they did not have the power to relocate the tower to another place and said any approvals made by DBKK have to go through the state government. Malaysian Architect Association (PAM) have strongly voiced their opposition to the state government decision and said any heritage sites that have been gazetted in the state should be treasured and protected.
