= Philip Jean =

British painter (1755–1802)

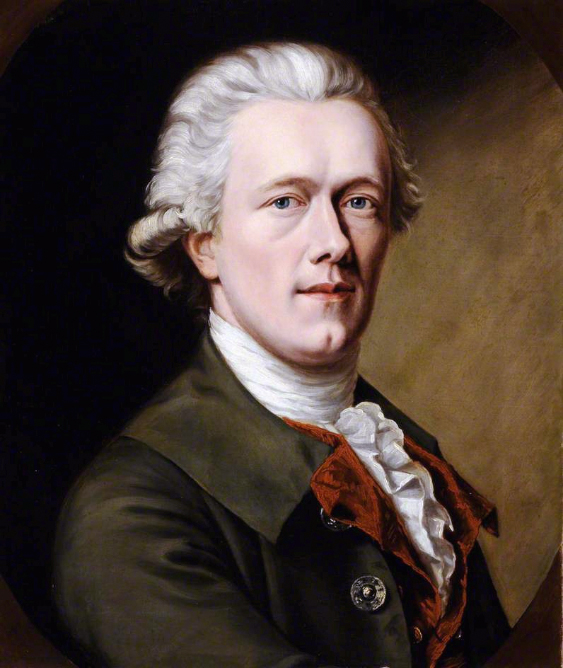
- Self-portrait, 1770
- Born: 1755; Saint Ouen, Jersey
- Died: 1802 (aged 46–47); Hempstead, Kent
- Occupation: Painter

Philip Jean (1755–1802) was a British painter.

== Career and life ==
Jean was born in Saint Ouen, Jersey, the son of Nicholas Jean and Marie Grandin. He was at first in the Royal Navy, but later devoted himself to painting. He was chiefly a miniaturist, yet also worked with oils. While settled in London, Jean painted portraits of many members of the British royal family, amongst them the portraits of George III, of the Queen Charlotte, of the Duke and Duchess of Gloucester and of their children. He exhibited at the Royal Academy from 1787 to 1802. Amongst other collections, his works belong to the Victoria and Albert Museum and Windsor Castle.

Jean was married twice. His first wife (married 1781 in Jersey) was Anna (or Anne) Noel (1758 Jersey - 1787), the daughter of a large and prominent Jersey family. They had two children; Roger, who also became a miniaturist, and Anne Marthe. Jean remarried after Anna's death, to Marie de Ste Croix (1763 Jersey - 1820, married 1788 in Saint Saviour, Jersey) and they had 4 children (Mary, Harriot, Philip and Henriette Elizabeth). He died in Hempstead, Kent.

== Gallery ==
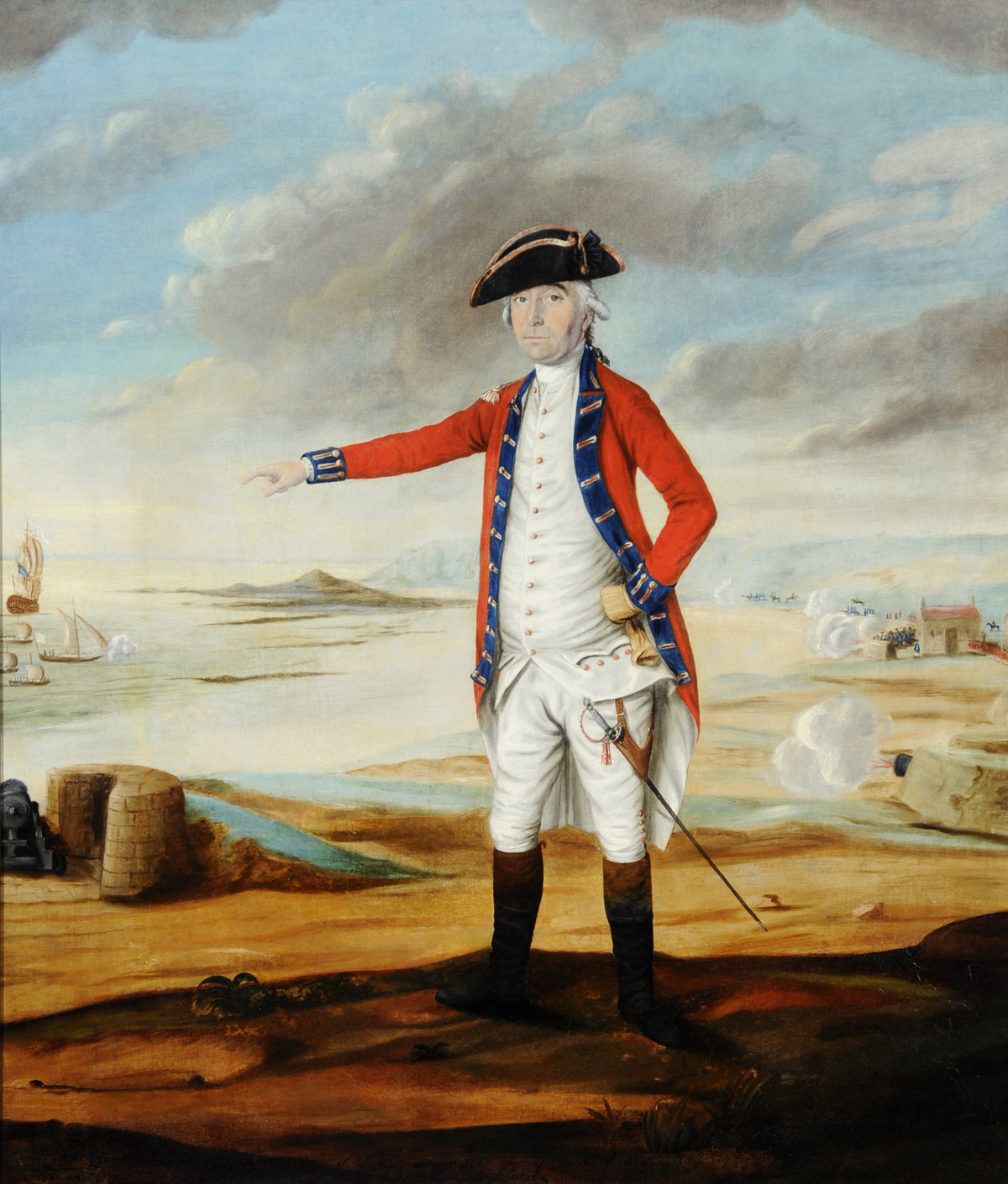
Moses Corbet (c. 1779)

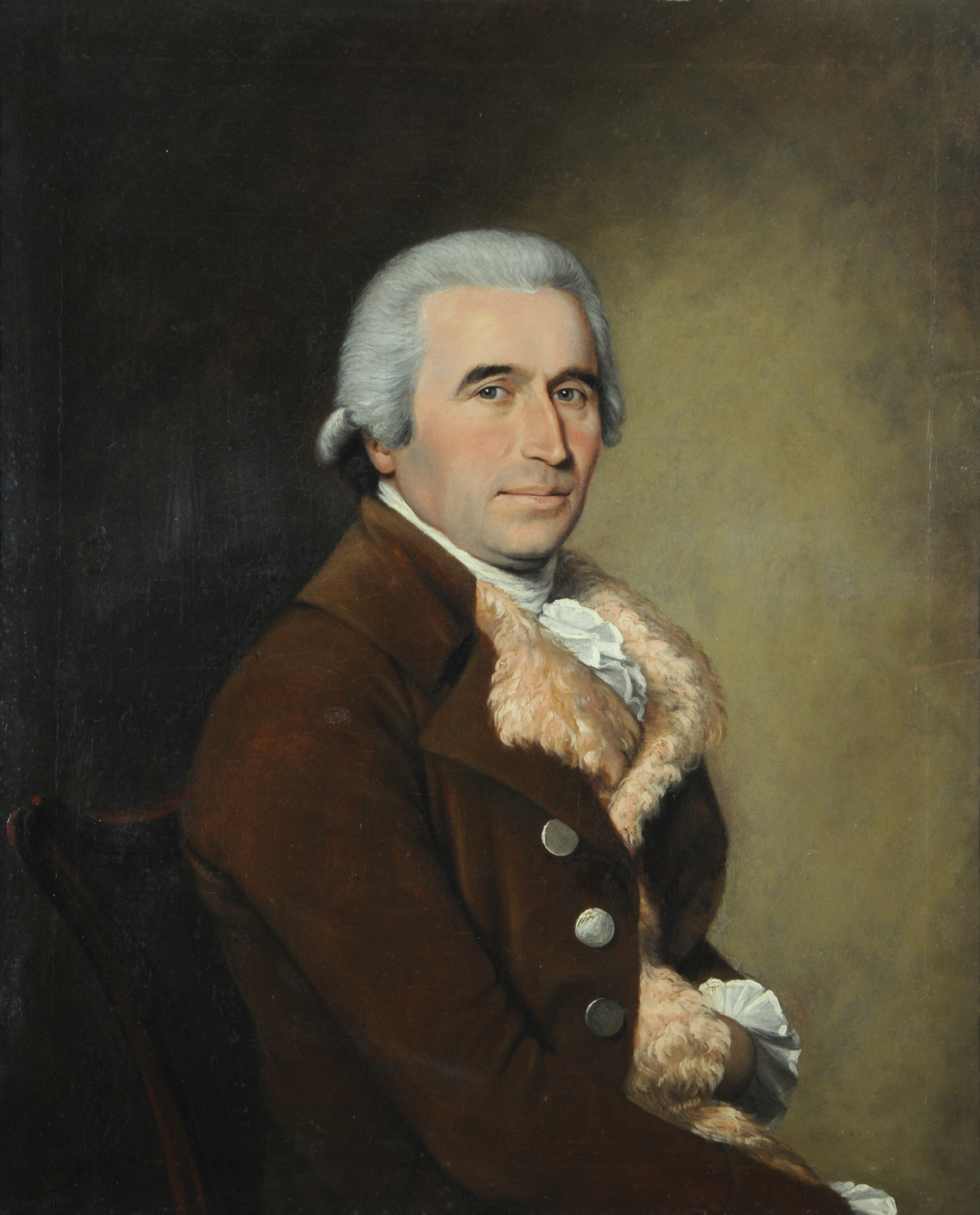
Portrait of a Man in a Brown Coat and a Fleece Waistcoat (1780)

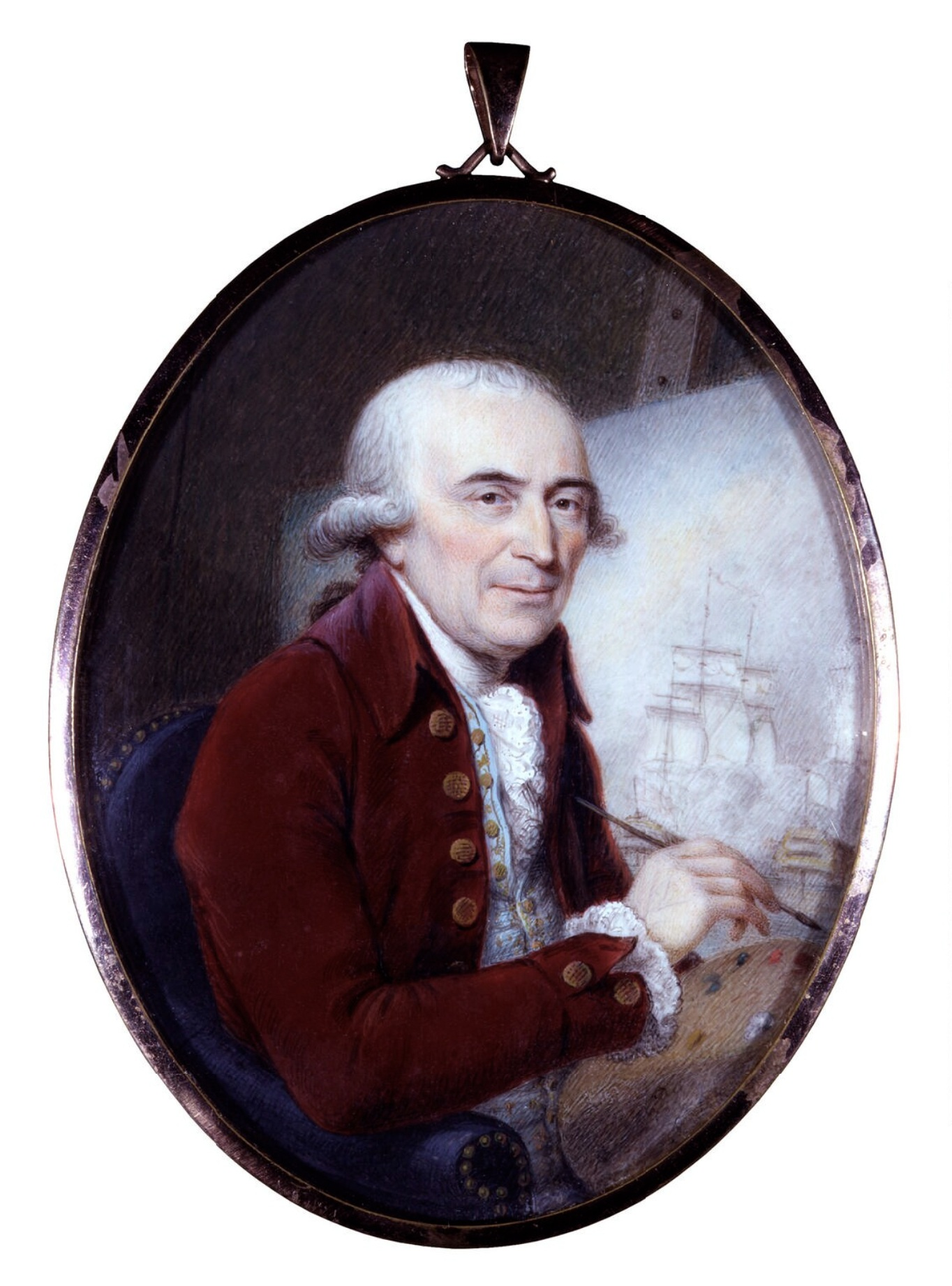
Dominic Serres (1778)

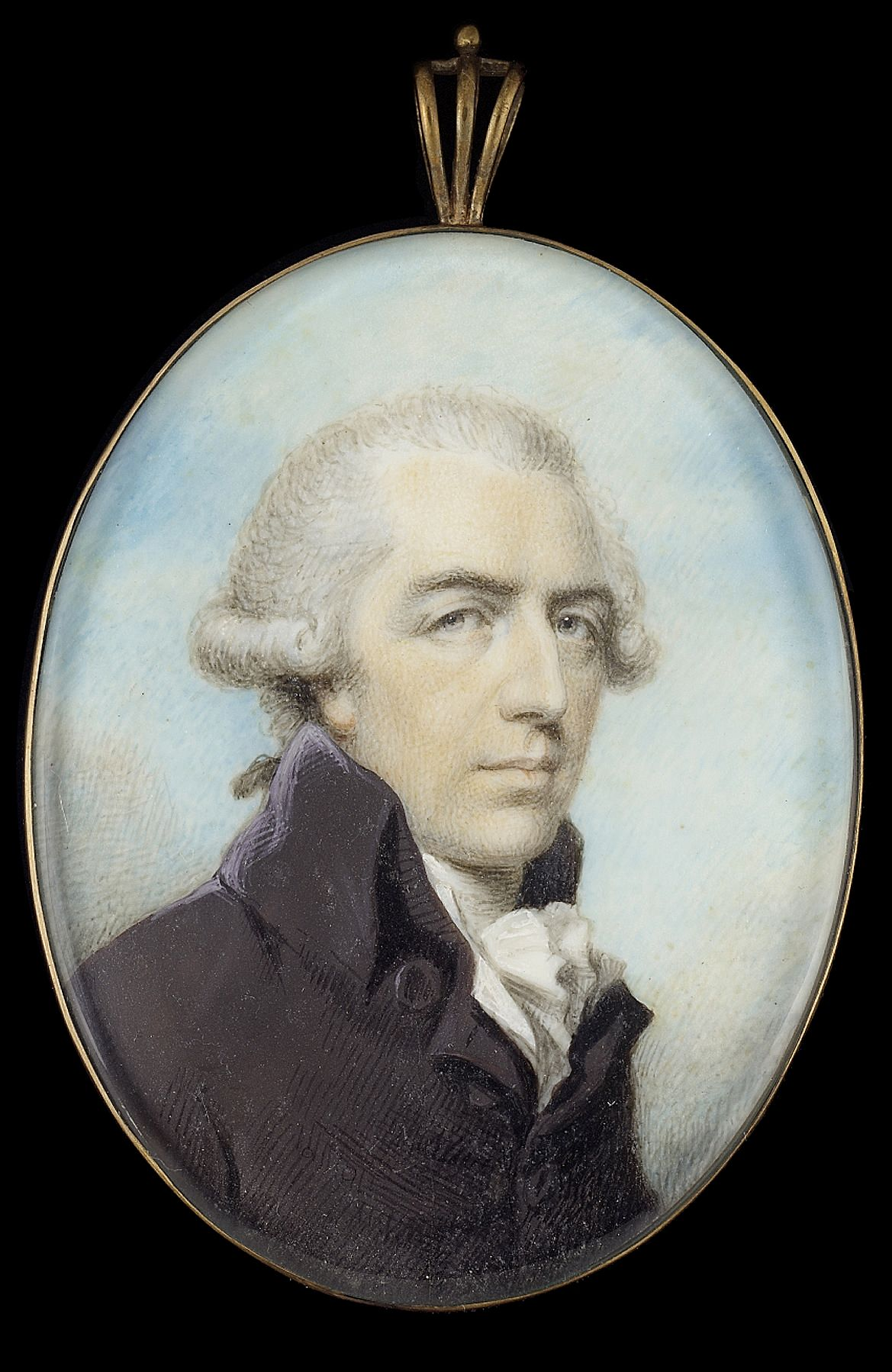
Francis Reynolds-Moreton, 3rd Baron Ducie

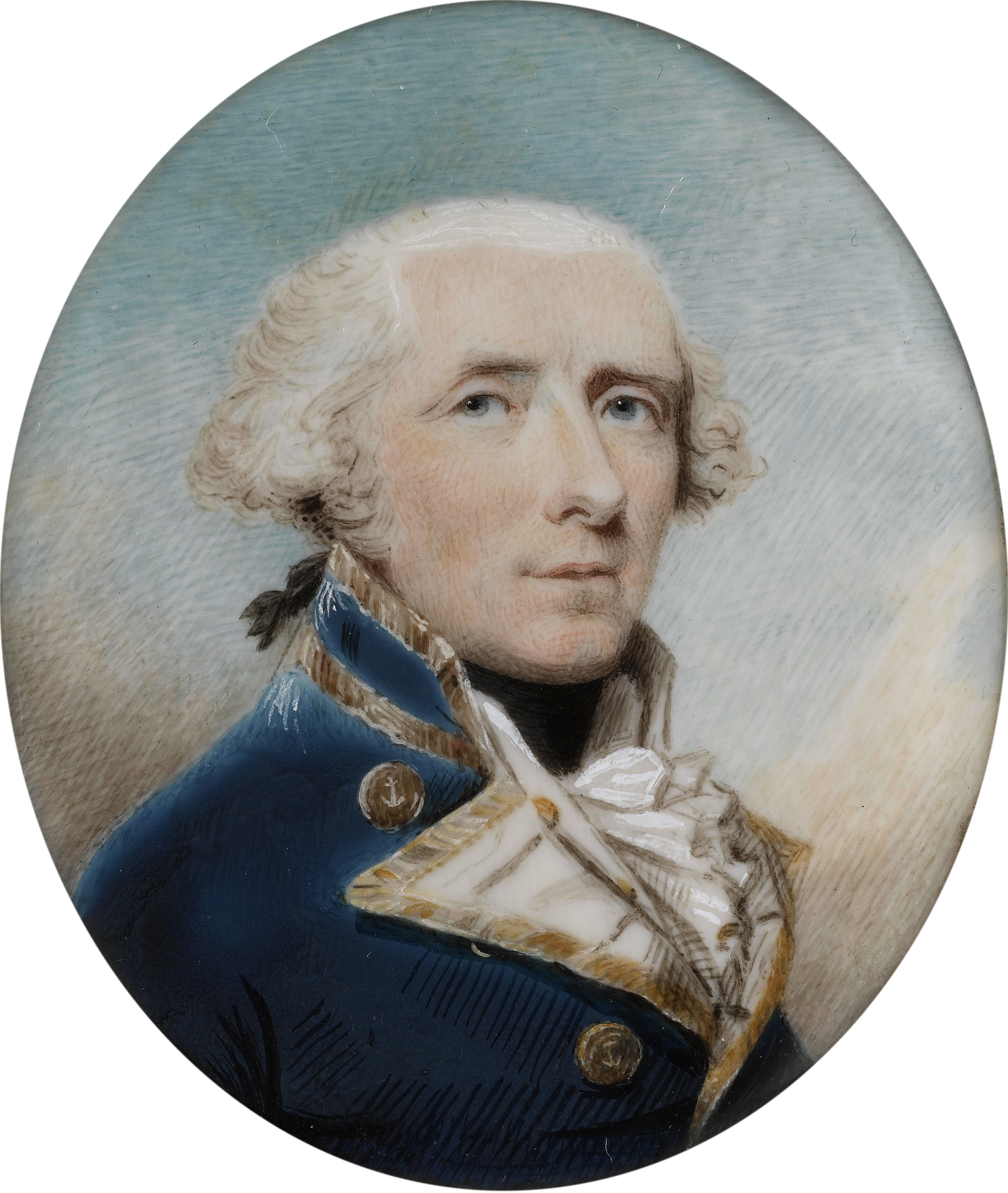
Skeffington Lutwidge

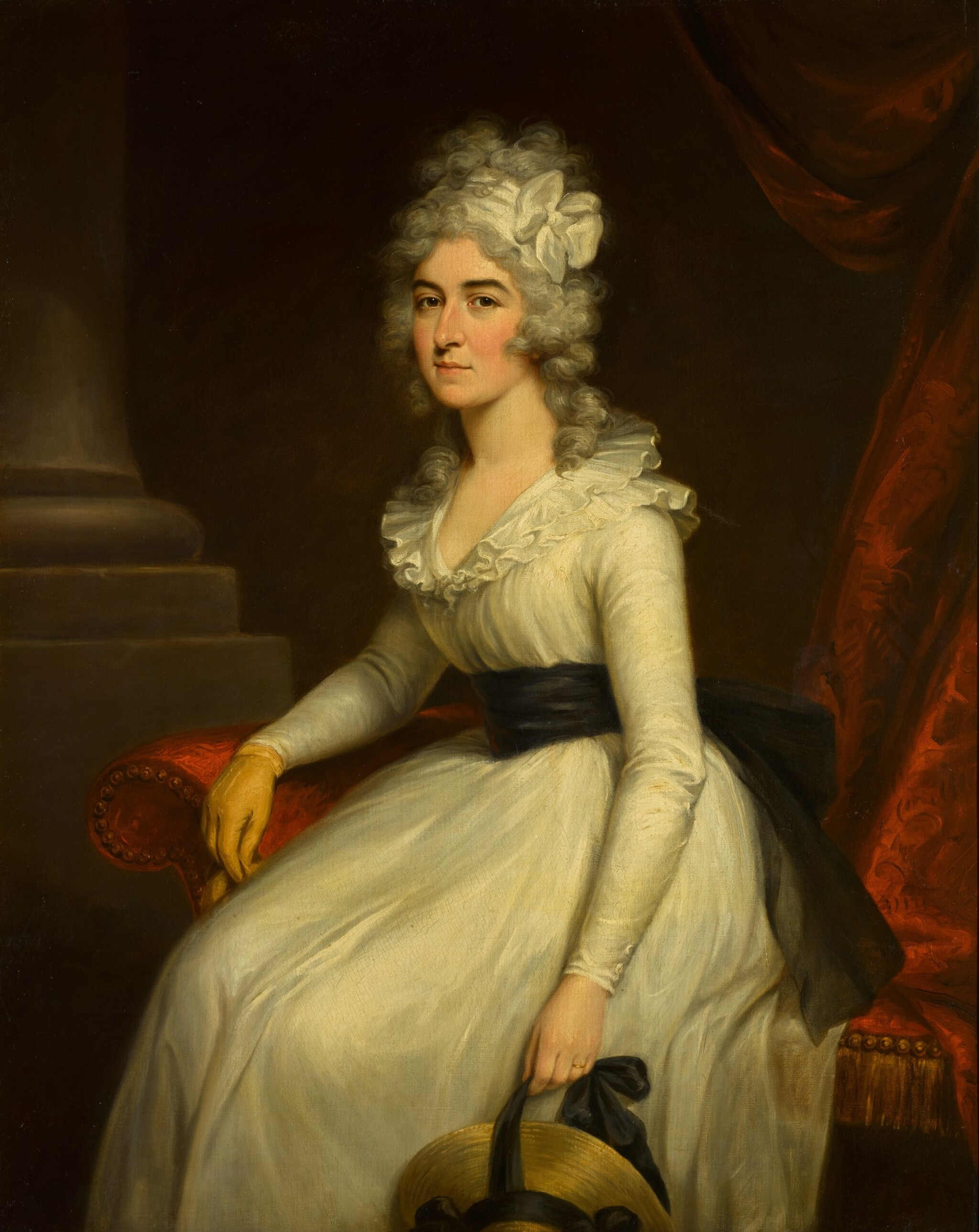
Portrait of Mrs Bryan Barrett
