= Cyril Le Marquand =

Cyril Le Marquand (1902 - 1980) was a Jersey politician and businessman.

== Early years ==
He was born on 6 March 1902 at Bel Royal, St Lawrence, the only son of Joshua Le Marquand and Lilian Le Feuvre. He was educated at Victoria College from 1916 to 1919, and joined the family business of Le Marquand Brothers on leaving school.

In 1939, just after the outbreak of war, he left Jersey with his family and lived in Wales, becoming a member of the Home Guard.

== Political career ==
Le Marquand returned to Jersey in 1945 and, as a founder of the Jersey Progressive Party, tried and failed to get elected as Deputy. In 1946, he gave evidence to the Privy Council Committee on States Reform, which led to the States Reform Bill (1948) removing rectors and jurats from the States, and making the Dean's role non-voting. In 1948, the first election after the reform, he was elected Deputy, along with ten other members of the Progressive Party, including his cousin John Le Marquand.

In 1957, he was elected as Senator, topping the poll, and became President of the States Finance Committee, which later became the Finance and Economics Committee. He held this office until his sudden death on 27 February 1980.

The main Government of Jersey office building, from 1982, Cyril Le Marquand House on Union Street, was named after him.

== Bibliography ==
- Balleine's History of Jersey
- A Biographical Dictionary of Jersey, Volume 2
- Jersey Evening Post
