= Caroline LeSueur =

American Mormon pioneer (1814–1898)

Personal details
- Born: June 11, 1814 Velle Babet, Jersey
- Died: October 1, 1898 (aged 84) St. Johns, Arizona
- Spouse: John LeSueur

Caroline LeSueur (June 11, 1814 – October 1, 1898) was a Mormon pioneer and one of the founders of St. Johns, Arizona.

== Early life ==
LeSueur was born Caroline Le Gresley on June 11, 1814, in Velle Babet, Jersey, Channel Islands. She married John Le Sueur in 1836 at St. Ouen's Parish Church, and they lived initially the parish of St Peter.

Within two years they had two children, a boy and a girl, the first of whom died in infancy.

They moved to Saint Helier, the seaport capital of Jersey, where John worked first as a teamster, and then in a candle factory. Caroline operated a small grocery store in her front room where she sold vegetables grown in her garden. In St. Helier they had four more children, three of whom survived to adulthood.

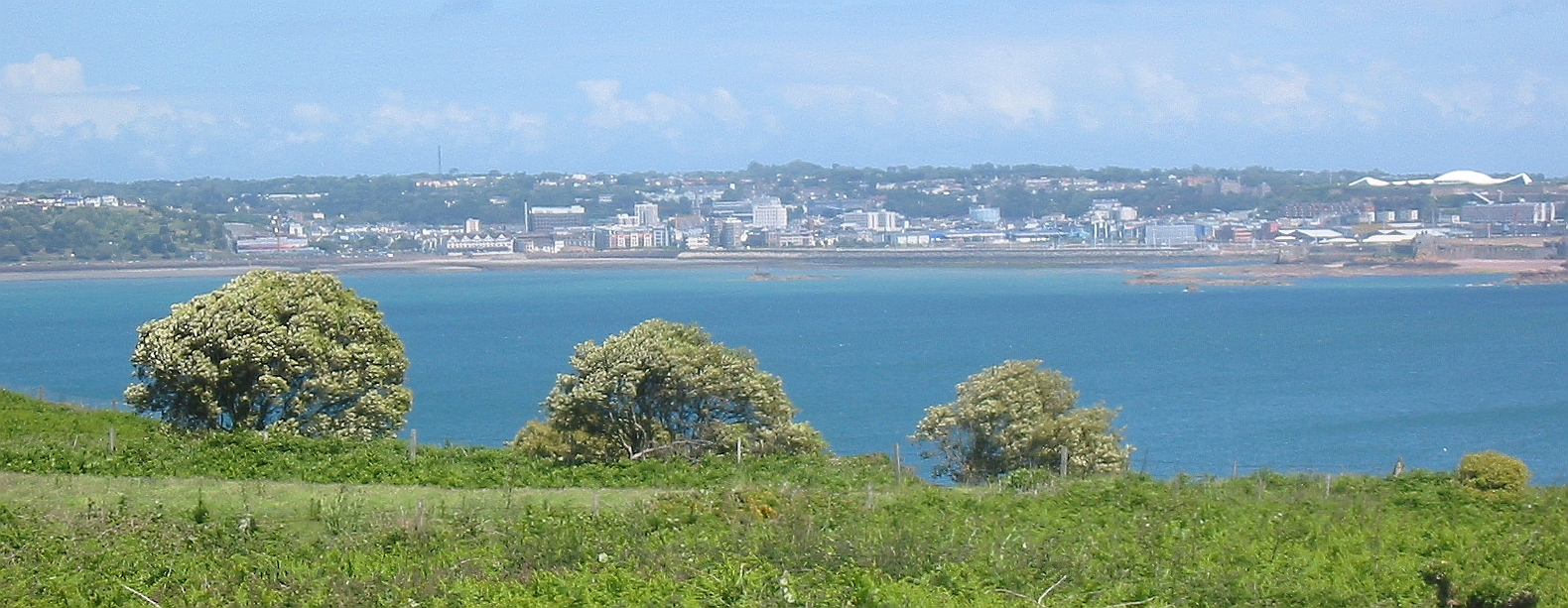
Saint Helier viewed across St Aubin's Bay from the west

== Mormonism ==
When her husband expressed interest in some Mormon missionaries' message, Caroline forbade him from further investigation. He continued investigating anyway, and the couple soon had regular religious debates with each other. Something piqued her interest, and she investigated the Mormons herself. She accepted Mormonism and the couple was baptized in 1849.

== Emigration ==
Friends, neighbors, and store customers shunned the LeSueurs after they joined the Mormons. The couple wanted to emigrate to Utah Territory, but it took six years to save for the journey. Finally, in 1855 they crossed the Atlantic aboard the Chimborazo. In America, the family name Le Sueur became LeSueur.

Upon arrival in Utah the family settled in Bountiful, where they remained for ten years except for a short stint in American Fork during the Utah War. The family began to be prosperous and by 1862 had no debt, a home on 30 acres (120,000 m^{2}), and a herd of livestock. However, that year John LeSueur died, leaving his wife with four children at home, ages 6 to 14, plus two married daughters.

Caroline took over management of the farm, leased it out, and three years later moved her family to Montpelier, Idaho. That town was just being settled and they moved into a two-room log cabin. By the time they left Montpelier 13 years later, they lived in one of the best homes in downtown Montpelier.

LeSueur became one of the first settlers of Mesa, Arizona Territory, when she moved her family there in 1879. They later moved on to a small Mexican village in northeastern Arizona named St. Johns. The Mormons had purchased most of the land around the village and were looking for settlers. LeSueur worked for the remainder of her life building of the town. She died there on October 1, 1898.
