= John Le Marquand =

Former Jersey politician

John Le Marquand OBE (1912 – 19 October 2008 ) was a Jersey senator.

Le Marquand was born in 1912, the son of Jurat John Le Marquand. He was educated at Victoria College. His cousin was Senator Cyril Le Marquand. His obituary in the Jersey Evening Post described him as "among the dominant figures in post-war Jersey politics." He was a member of the Education Committee of the States of Jersey between 1948 and 1969, where he promoted improvements and new buildings in the island's school system.

He was awarded the OBE in the 1986 Birthday Honours. He died in Saint Brélade, aged 92.
