= Serge Testa =

Australian yachtsman

Serge Testa is an Australian yachtsman who holds the world record for the circumnavigation in the smallest boat, completing the voyage in 1987. His 11-foot-10-inch (3.61 m) boat, the Acrohc Australis, was designed so that all controls could be operated from inside enabling him to close the hatch in foul weather. The boat was donated by Serge to the Queensland Maritime Museum in South Bank, Queensland.

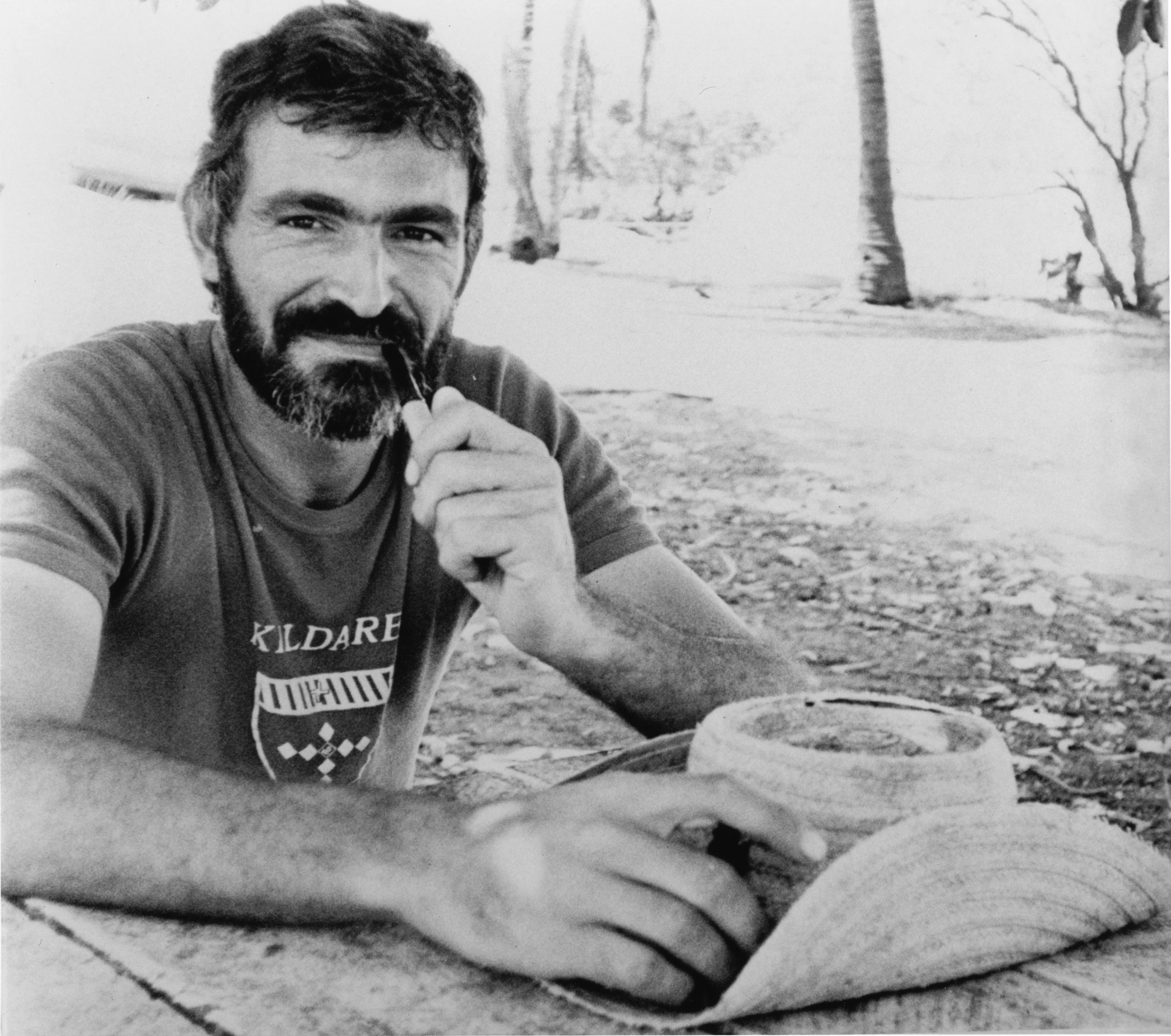
Serge Testa, taken during his circumnavigation in Acrohc Australis

== Publications ==
- Testa, Serge. 500 Days: Around the World on a 12 Foot Yacht. Trident Press, 1988. ISBN 0-7316-4849-8.

== See also ==
- Andrew Fagan, another antipodean small-boat sailor
