= Francis George Atkinson =

- Francis G Atkinson
- Born: 1874; Victoria College, Jersey (Channel Islands)
- Died: 6 December 1902; British North Borneo
- Occupation: First District Officer in Jesselton
- Known for: Atkinson Clock Tower

Francis George Atkinson (1874 – 6 December 1902) was the first district officer in Jesselton at British North Borneo.

== Life and career ==
Atkinson was the second son of the Rev. F. H. Atkinson of Jersey and Mrs Mary Edith Atkinson. He was born in 1874 and educated at Victoria College, Jersey (Channel Islands).

After experiencing some time in Australia, he joined the Borneo service in March 1898 and was appointed to be District Officer, Jesselton in January 1901. Mr. Atkinson was popular among the government and his colleagues. He was fondly known as "West Coast Atky"

== Death ==
Following an attack of malaria fever on 4 December, Atkinson suffered a heart failure and died in Jesselton on 6 December at the age of 28. His death in December 1902 was officially announced in The Straits Times newspaper on 10 January 1903. The British North Borneo Herald pays the following tribute to his memory:

By the death of Mr. Atkinson the Government is robbed of one of its best officials and each member of the service loses a friend and companion; for everyone knew "West Coast Atky" and all loved him.

Amongst the Juniors of the service service – and, like those whom the gods love, he died young, – Mr. Atkinson was regarded with a species of hero worship, as the mainliest of them all, and his fine physique and handsome presence were their pride and admiration.

It is no mere assertion to say he had no enemies, and it is equally true that he was the most popular official in the service.

Like most physically strong men his good temper and generosity of heart were proverbial and many a time has his heavy hand been stayed by dint of those good qualities from punishing the evil-doer.

His mother Mrs Mary Edith Atkinson had presented a two-faced clock to Jesselton town as a tribute to the memory of her son and it was decided later that a clock tower would be built in his honor. The Atkinson Clock Tower was commissioned on 20 April 1905.
