= Wilfred Krichefski =

Jersey politician

Personal details
- Born: 1916 Jersey
- Died: December 1974 (aged 57–58)
- Profession: Politician and television executive

Wilfred Harold Krichefski (1916 – December 1974), an Orthodox Jew, co-founded Jersey's synagogue with the Rev Wiseman in 1972. Krichefski was a Jersey senator and television executive. After his death, he was accused of sexual abuse of children at the Haut de la Garenne children's home in Jersey.

He was the first managing director of Jersey's television station, Channel TV, now known as ITV Channel Television.

== Military service ==
He served in the Royal Army Pay Corps in World War II, being appointed a second lieutenant on 20 December 1942.
