= Mini Globe Race =

Single-handed round-the-world yacht race

The Mini Globe Race is a single-handed round-the-world yacht race contested in Class Globe 5.80 yachts. The first edition of the Mini Globe Race started in February 2025 and finished in March 2026. The proposed course is westward, starting and finishing in the Caribbean, transiting Panama Canal and rounding the Cape of Good Hope. The race is expected to cover more than 26,000 miles and take 400 days to complete. The final course is not yet determined.

The Class Globe 5.80 yacht is designed as an affordable, round-the-world capable single-handed yacht that ships readily inside a standard 20' shipping container. Yacht plans have sold to more than 23 countries, and construction is underway around the world. The race is limited to 30 entrants and is expected to take around one year to complete.

Entries opened in August 2021. A pre-notice of race was published on 1 October 2021, and updated on 20 February 2023. The 2023 update included significant changes to the proposed race course and qualification requirements. The official race website was published in February 2023 (www.minigloberace.com).

== Course ==
Mini Globe Race Course (per Pre-Notice of Race February 2023)

Leg 1: Antigua to Panama (1300 nm). Truck across Panama, keels on, rigs off.

Leg 2: Panama to island of entrant’s choice, 8 day stop, to Tahiti (total 4500 nm), 7 day stop, to Tonga (1500 nm), 8 day stop, to Fiji (500 nm).

Leg 3: Fiji to Darwin (3000 nm), 8 day stop, to Mauritius (4200 nm), 10 day stop, to Durban (1500 nm), 14 day stop, to Cape Town (1000 nm), 21 day stop.

Leg 4: Cape Town to St. Helena (1800 nm), 8 days pit stop, to Recife (1800 nm), 8 day stop, to Antigua (2500 nm).

Total 23500 miles

Race starters are required to have completed a prologue Globe 5.80 Transat event in either 2023 or 2024, sailing from Lagos, Portugal to Lanzarote, to Antigua.

== Trophies ==
- Mini Globe Race Perpetual Trophy for overall winner.
- Individual leg winner for each leg.
- Seniors class (over 60 years old) trophies for overall class winner and individual leg class winner.
- The McIntyre Adventure Spirit of the MGR trophy will be presented to the most deserving entrant finishing.

== Entrants ==
COUNTRY	ENTRANT NAME	HULL NO.	Vessel Name
United Kingdom	Ertan Beskardes	01	Trekka
Australia	Daniel Turner	05	
Canada	Dan Turk	20	Little Bea
Portugal	Philip Bienz	21	Blackjack
Switzerland	Renaud Stitelmann	28	Capucinette
United Kingdom	Jasmine Harrison	88	Numbatou
Italy	Marco Buonanni	93	Bandolero
Australia	Mike Blenkinsop	99	
Australia	John Blenkinsop	100	
Australia	Gary Swindail	111	Question 2
Germany	Patrick Forkel	124	Ada
USA	Joshua Kali	157	
United Kingdom	Adam Waugh	170	Little Wren

== Previously Published Course (Pre-Notice of Race 2021) ==
The published course is in four legs, with a seven day stop at each of the intermediate within-leg ports:

Leg 1: Portugal to Canary Islands (800 nm), to Antigua (3000 nm), to Panama (1200 nm). Truck across, keels on, rigs off. (5000 nm leg total)

Leg 2: Panama to Tahiti (4500 nm), to Tonga (1300 nm), to Fiji (600 nm). (6400 nm leg total)

Leg 3: Fiji to Darwin (3000 nm), to Mauritius (4300 nm), to Cape Town (2400 nm). (9700 nm leg total)

Leg 4: Cape Town to St. Helena (1900 nm), to Cape Verde (2400 nm), to Portugal (1600 nm). (5900 miles)

== Initially publicized race proposal ==
The initial publicity for the Mini Globe Race, beginning in April 2020, included the course and related trophies detailed below These were subsequently changed with publication of the pre-notice of race:

Mini Globe Race course as initially proposed in April 2020

=== Course ===
The proposed course was

Leg 1: Portugal to Canary Islands (800 nm), 4 day stop, to Caribbean (2700 nm), 7 day stop, to Panama (1200 nm).

Leg 2: Panama to Marquesas (3800 nm), 7 day stop, to Tahiti (800 nm).

Leg 3: Tahiti to Tonga (1400 nm).

Leg 4: Tonga to Kupang, Indonesia (3800 nm).

Leg 5: Kupang to Mauritius (3800 nm), 7 day stop, to Cape Town (2400, nm).

Leg 6: Cape Town to Cape Verde (4000 nm), 7 day stop, to Portugal.

=== Trophies ===
Individual trophies are awarded for:

“Logical Route” trophy for first vessel from Europe to Tahiti (referencing Bernard Moitessier's "la longue route" voyage to Tahiti in Joshua).

“Bounty Challenge” trophy to winner of Leg 4 Tonga to Kupang, Indonesia (after William Bligh's open boat voyage following the Mutiny on the Bounty).
