= Bob Le Sueur =

Jersey resident (1920–2022)

Bob Le Sueur MBE
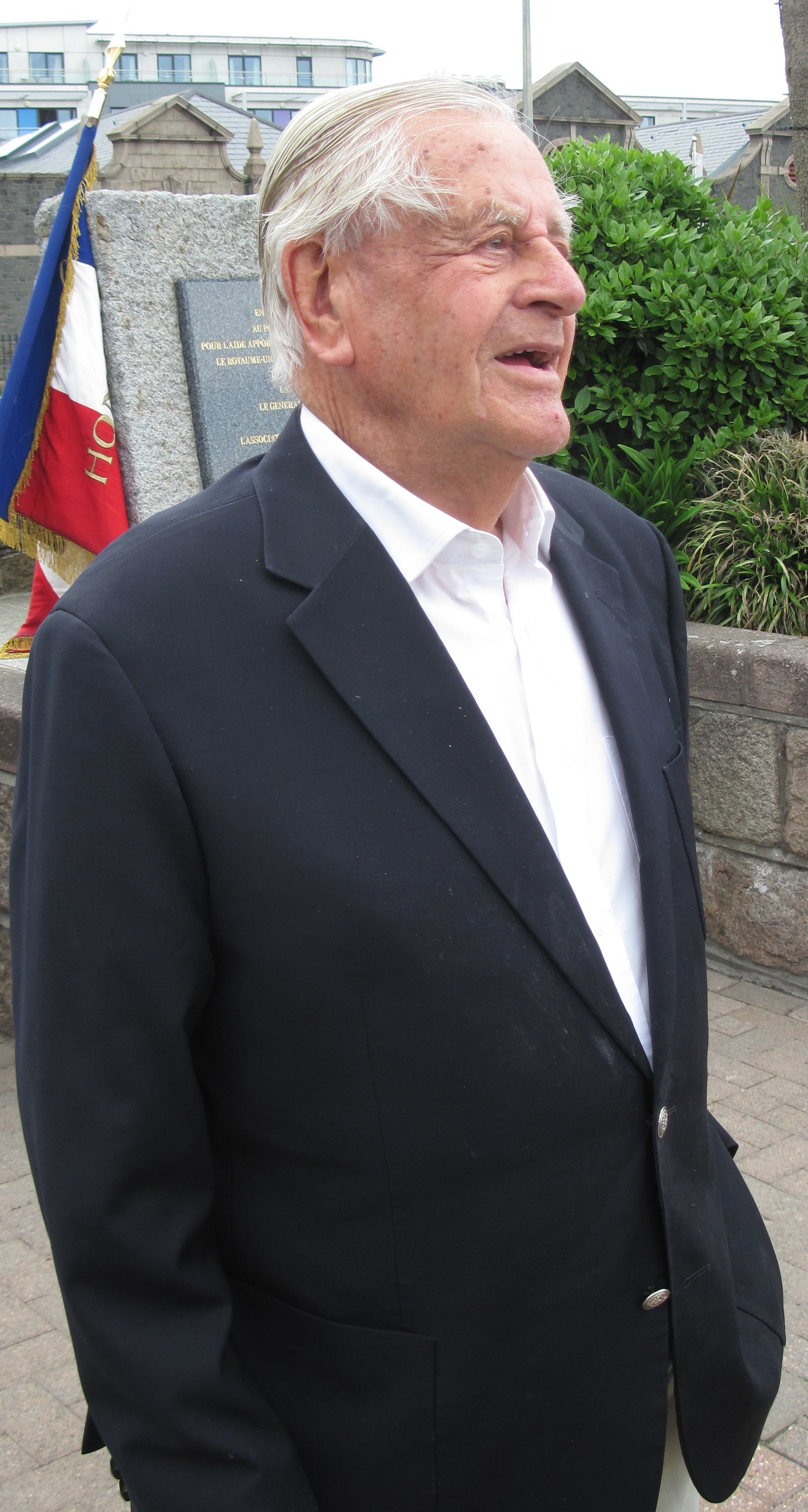
- Le Sueur in 2013
- Born: Robert Winter Le Sueur; 3 October 1920; Jersey
- Died: 5 November 2022 (aged 102); Jersey

Robert Winter Le Sueur, MBE (3 October 1920 – 5 November 2022) was a British humanitarian. A resident of Jersey, he was awarded an MBE for his efforts in assisting escaped Russian prisoners, in Jersey, during the Nazi Occupation of the Channel Islands.

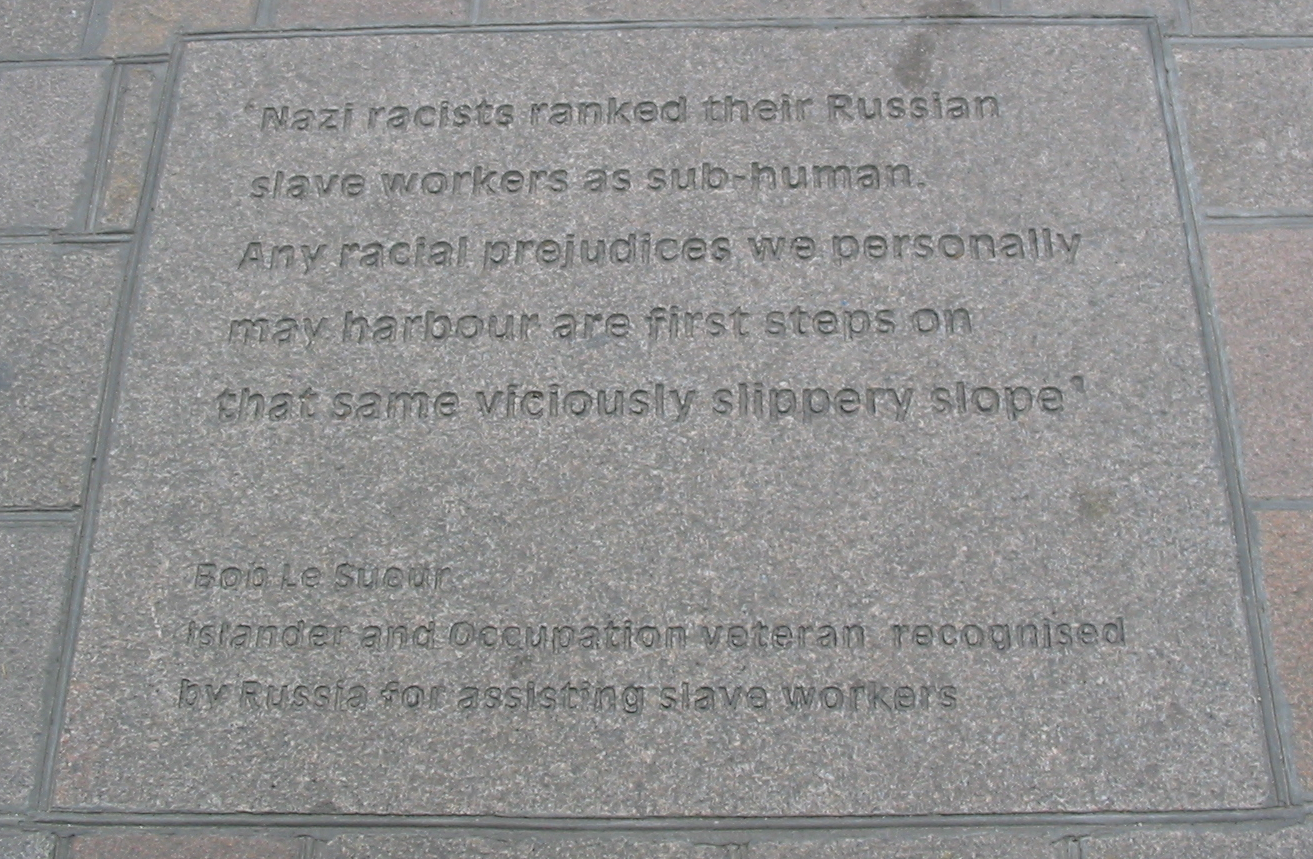
Plaque quoting Le Sueur located in York Street, Saint Helier: part of a monument to experiences of the Occupation 1940-1945

During the Occupation, Le Sueur was able to move about due to his work as an insurance agent. He acted as relay in a network of people sheltering escapees: from 1942 he handled eight or nine escapees. After the war he was a teacher of English and foreign languages.

He was appointed a Member of the Order of the British Empire (MBE) in the 2013 Birthday Honours "for services to the community."

== Portrait ==
A 2007 portrait of Le Sueur, by artist Stephen Shankland, is held by the Jersey Museum and Art Gallery.

== Personal life and death ==
Le Sueur died at his home on 5 November 2022, at the age of 102.
