= St Peter, Jersey =

Parish in western Jersey

Coordinates: 49.21805°N 2.19109°W

Saint Peter Saint Pièrre (French and Jèrriais)
- Jersey parish
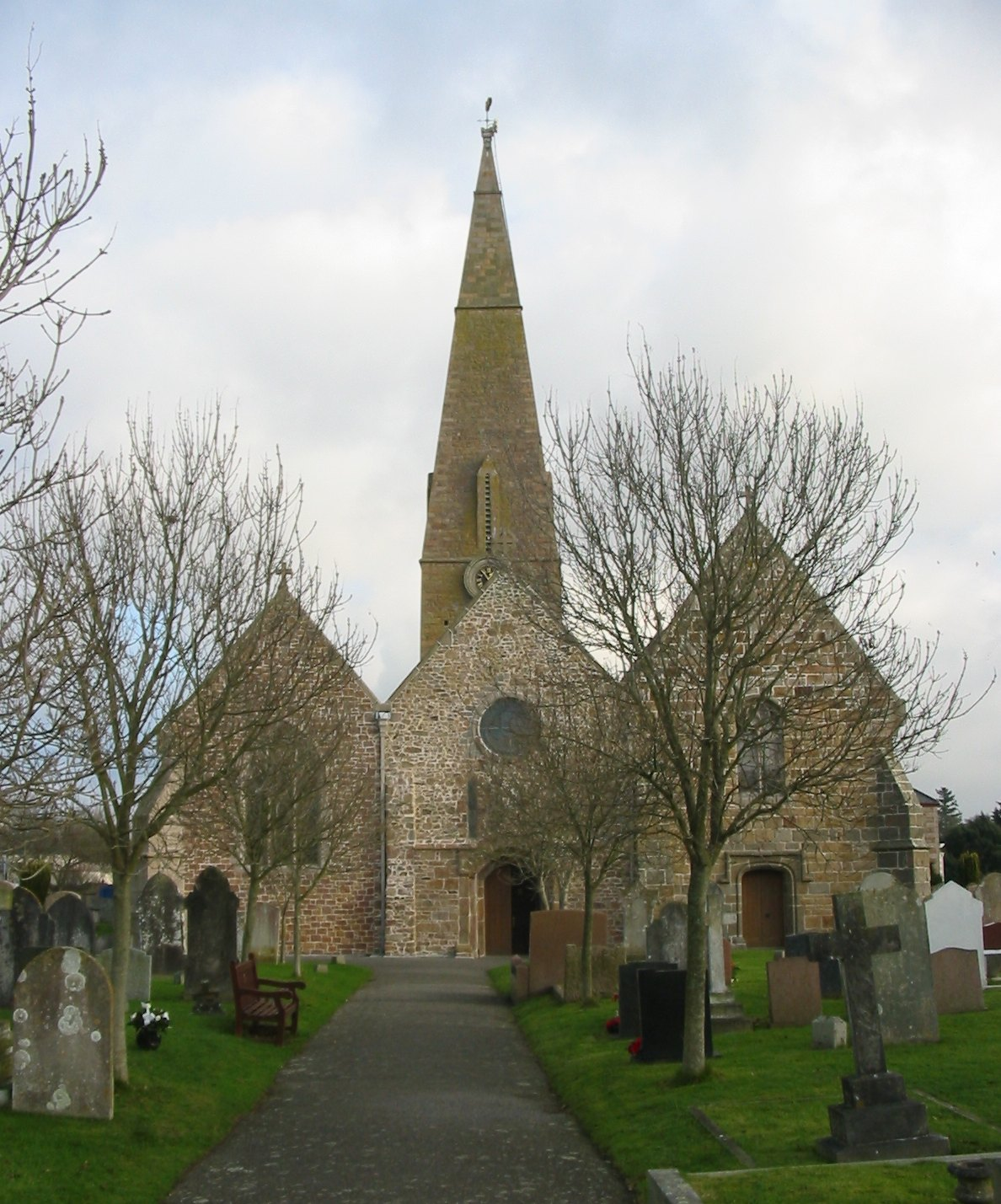
- St. Peter's parish church

- Flag Coat of arms

- Location of Saint Peter in Jersey
- Crown Dependency: Jersey, Channel Islands

Government
  - Connétable: Richard Vibert

Area
  - Total: 11.6 km^{2} (4.5 sq mi)
  - Rank: Ranked 4th
- Elevation: 84 m (276 ft)

Population (2011)
  - Total: 5,003
  - Density: 431/km^{2} (1,120/sq mi)
- Time zone: GMT
  - Summer (DST): UTC+01
- Postcode district: JE3
- Postcode sector: 7

St Peter (French: Saint-Pièrre; Jèrriais: St Pièrre) is one of the twelve parishes of Jersey in the Channel Islands. It is around 6.5 kilometres (4.0 mi) north-west of St Helier. (Note: Measured from the Parish Hall to the Royal Square) The parish has a population of 5,003. It has a surface area of 10.6 square kilometres (4.1 sq mi).

It is the only parish with two separate coastlines, stretching from St Ouen's Bay in the west to St Aubin's Bay in the south, and thereby cutting St Brelade off from other parishes. It also borders St Ouen and St Mary to the north and St Lawrence to the east. A large portion of the parish is occupied by Jersey Airport.

The traditional nickname for St. Pierrais is ventres à baînis (limpet bellies), perhaps because their parish sticks to two coasts like limpets.

== History ==
The Jersey parish system has been in place for centuries. By Norman times, the parish boundaries were firmly fixed and remain largely unchanged since. In 1180 Jersey was divided by the Normans into three ministeria for administrative purposes. St Peter was part of Crapoudoit. Crapoudoit likely refers to the stream running through St Peter's Valley.

During the War of the Three Kingdoms, Parliamentarian forces invaded the island from Port de la Mare in St Peter. This was the last battle of the war before Sir George Carteret surrendered.

La Ville du Bocage housing estate in St. Peter's Village was opened in 1973 by the Connétable W. F. Le Marquand and the Rector B. J. Giles. In commemoration of the Queen's Diamond Jubilee, the Queen's Jubilee Homes, a small estate, were opened on 28 July 2012 by Lieutenant-Governor General Sir John McColl in the presence of Connétable John Refault. Le Clos des Charmes housing estate, constructed by Dandara Jersey and CTJ Housing Trust, was opened on 17 August 2007 by States Housing Minister Senatory Terry Le Main.

== Governance ==
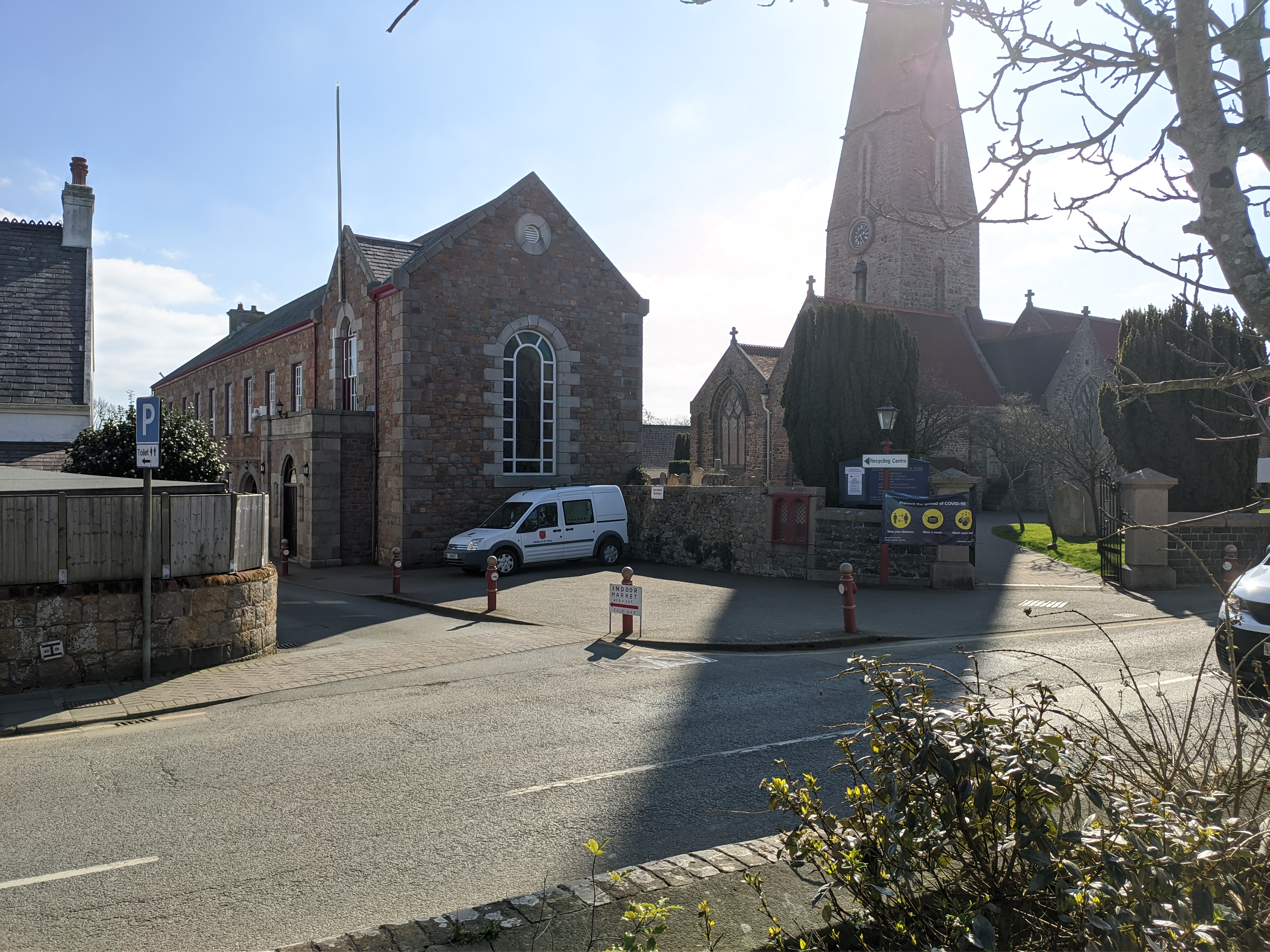
Parish Hall and Church

The parish is a first-level administrative division of the Bailiwick of Jersey, a British Crown dependency. The highest official in the parish is the Connétable of St. Peter. The incumbent office holder is Richard Vibert, who has held the office since 2018. The parish administration is headquartered at the Parish Hall next to the church.

At present, the parish forms one electoral district for States Assembly elections and elects one Deputy, as well as eight Senators in an islandwide constituency. The current Deputy for St. Peter is Huelin Rowland. Under the proposed electoral reform, it will form part of the North West electoral district consisting of St Mary, St Ouen and St Peter, which will collectively elect 4 representatives alongside the parishes' Connétables.

The parish is divided into five vingtaines for administrative purposes as follows:

- La Vingtaine du Douet
- La Vingtaine de St. Nicolas
- La Grande Vingtaine
- La Vingtaine des Augerez
- La Vingtaine du Coin Varin

== Geography ==
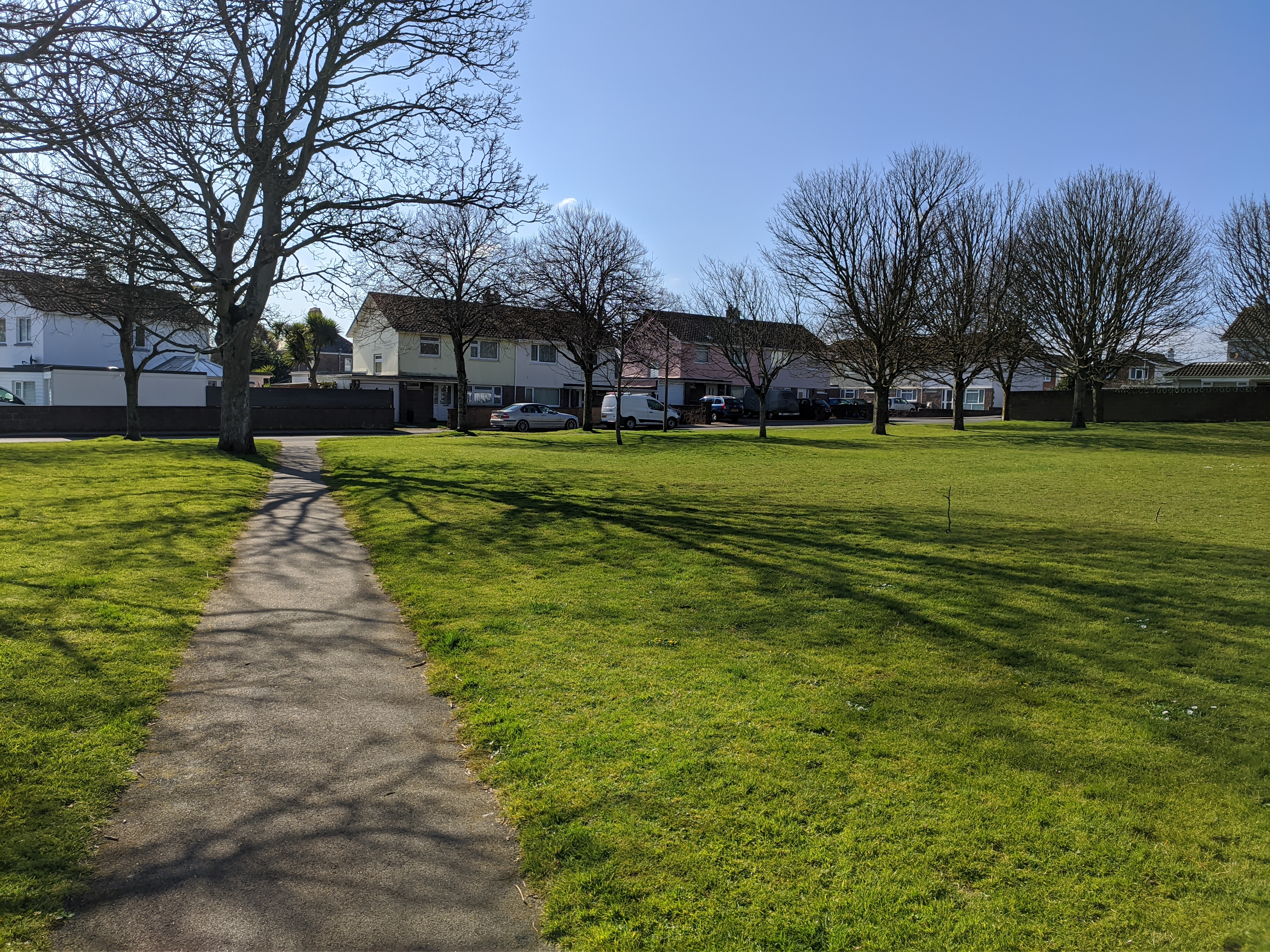
La Grand Pièce

St. Peter is located in the west of the island of Jersey, the largest island of the Channel Islands archipelago, part of the British Isles. Residential development in the parish is focused in the centre of the parish at St. Peter's Village and in the south-east of the parish at Beaumont Village.

== Demography ==
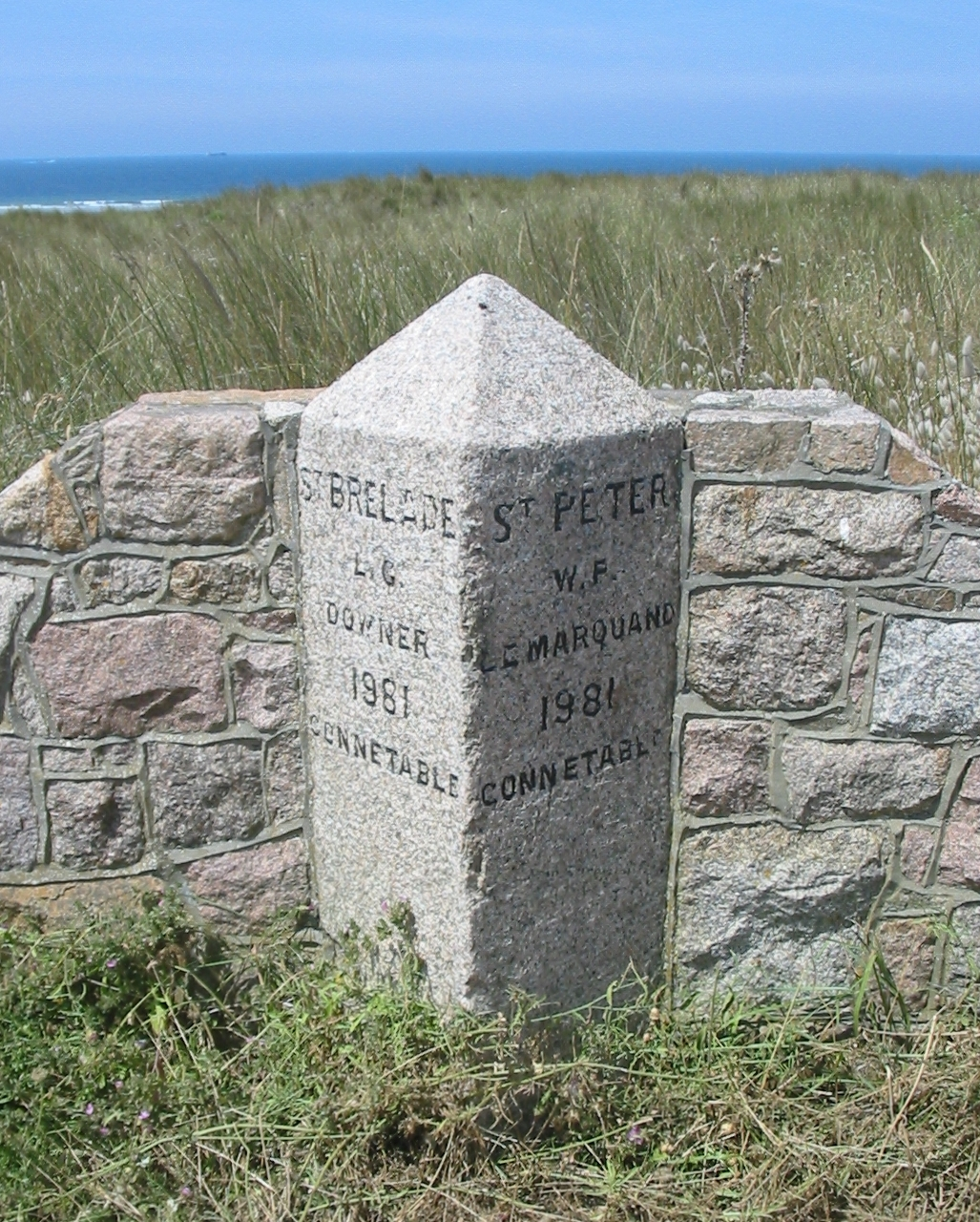
Boundary stone in St. Ouen's Bay between St. Brelade and St. Peter

Historical population
Year	Pop.	±%
1991	4,231	—
1996	4,228	−0.1%
2001	4,293	+1.5%
2011	5,003	+16.5%

== Twin towns ==
St. Peter is twinned with:

- (France) Saint-Hilaire-du-Harcouët, Normandy

== Transport ==
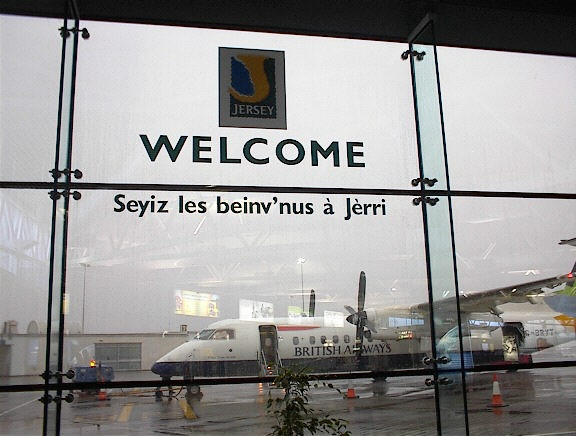
A welcome sign at Jersey Airport arrivals in Jèrriais, the heritage language of Jersey. In the background, a British Airways plane.

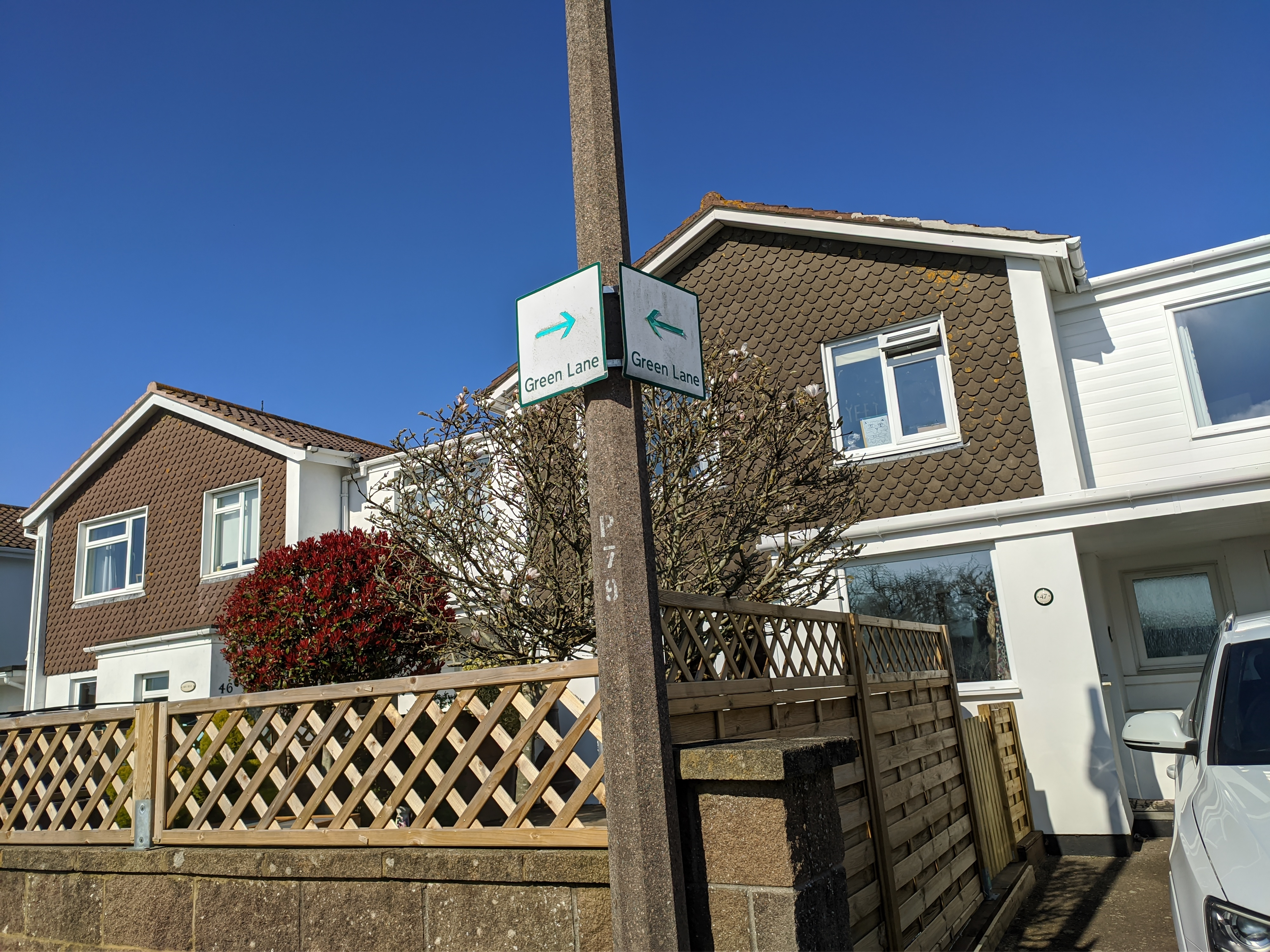
An old style Green Lane sign - St. Peter was the first parish to designate some lanes as green lanes

The island's airport, Jersey Airport, is the largest airport in the Channel Islands and is located in the parish. It was initially opened in 1937. In the 1950s, there was a road crossing the runway, controlled by traffic lights. A new departures terminal was opened in 1997. The airport runs nine daily flights to London, as well as to other destinations in the British Islands and abroad.

The parish was the first parish to introduce green lanes. Green lanes are lanes where pedestrians, cyclists and horseriders are given priority over motor traffic, with the latter being restricted to 'pedal speeds'. The distinctive green lane sign and 15 mile per hour speed limits were introduced on number of green and scenic lanes on St. Peter's day (29 June) in 1994.

== Education ==
St. Peter's School is located in La Rue du Presbytère, and is a state run primary school with 164 students in 2009. The fee-charging St. George's Preparatory School is located at La Hague Manor, Rue de la Hague, which is wholly owned by The Jersey Educational Trust.

== Sport ==
St. Peter Football and Sports Club is located on Rue des Vignes near St. Peter's Garden Centre. The sports club was founded in 1919 and is one of the oldest in the Channel Islands.

A multi-million pound sports complex known as Strive is under construction on Avenue de la Reine Elizabeth II. The two-storey main building will cover an area of 32,000 square feet (3,000 m^{2}) and will host one of Europe's most well-equipped gymnasiums, a hydrotherapy pool and a lecture theatre.

== Places of worship ==
The parish church was built by at least 1053. There are two bells called Elizabeth and Mary, dated to 1649 and 1754 respectively. There is an ancient unique custom in the parish to ring out the bells continuously on Christmas Eve and Christmas Day. It is dedicated to St Peter in the desert. The church spire is the island's tallest at 36.5 metres (120 ft) and has in history been struck by lightning three times: in 1612, 1843 and 1848.

== Notable people ==
- Gilbert O'Sullivan resides in Saint Peter with his wife Aase and their two children.
- Caroline LeSueur, a Mormon pioneer and one of the founders of St. Johns, Arizona.
- Augustus Asplet Le Gros, a Norman language poet and a Jurat of the Royal Court of Jersey.
- George William de Carteret, a Norman language journalist and writer
- Peter Vincenti, footballer
