= Vingtaine de la Quéruée =

Vingtaine in Saint Martin, Jersey

Vingtaine de la Quéruée is one of the five vingtaines of St Martin in the Channel Island of Jersey. The vingtaine is roughly rectangular in shape, bordering the Parish of Trinity to the west and the Parish of St Saviour to the south-west. The Vingtenier is currently M. Stevens enrolled through the Honorary Police of St. Martin. It is unclear whether the name of the vingtaine is derived from a corruption of 'la tchéthue,' meaning to plough in Jersey French, or whether it comes from a local family name.

Notable properties in the vingtaine include the Farmers Cricket Club Ground which opened in 2005, and La Préférence, a Victorian residence and subsequent children's home which was sold by the Government of Jersey for private development in 2014.

The vingtaine is celebrated in the naming of the orchid Phragmipedium Vingtaine de la Quéruée bred by the Eric Young Orchid Foundation and registered in 2015 with the Royal Horticultural Society.

The vingtaine has long been associated with the Le Maistre family of Jersey, who are believed to denote their surname to La Croix au Maitre in the northern extremity of the vingtaine. The vingtaine is similarly associated with the Quérée family who historically lived in Parishes of St. Martin and Trinity. Catherine Querée, born about 1535 and dying in 1615, was baptised in the neighbouring Parish of Trinity.

== See also ==
- Vingtaine de l'Eglise
- Vingtaine de Faldouet
- Vingtaine du Fief de la Reine
- Vingtaine de Rozel
