= Haut de la Garenne =

Building in Saint Martin, Jersey, in the Channel Islands

Jersey Accommodation and Activity Centre
- Haut de la Garenne
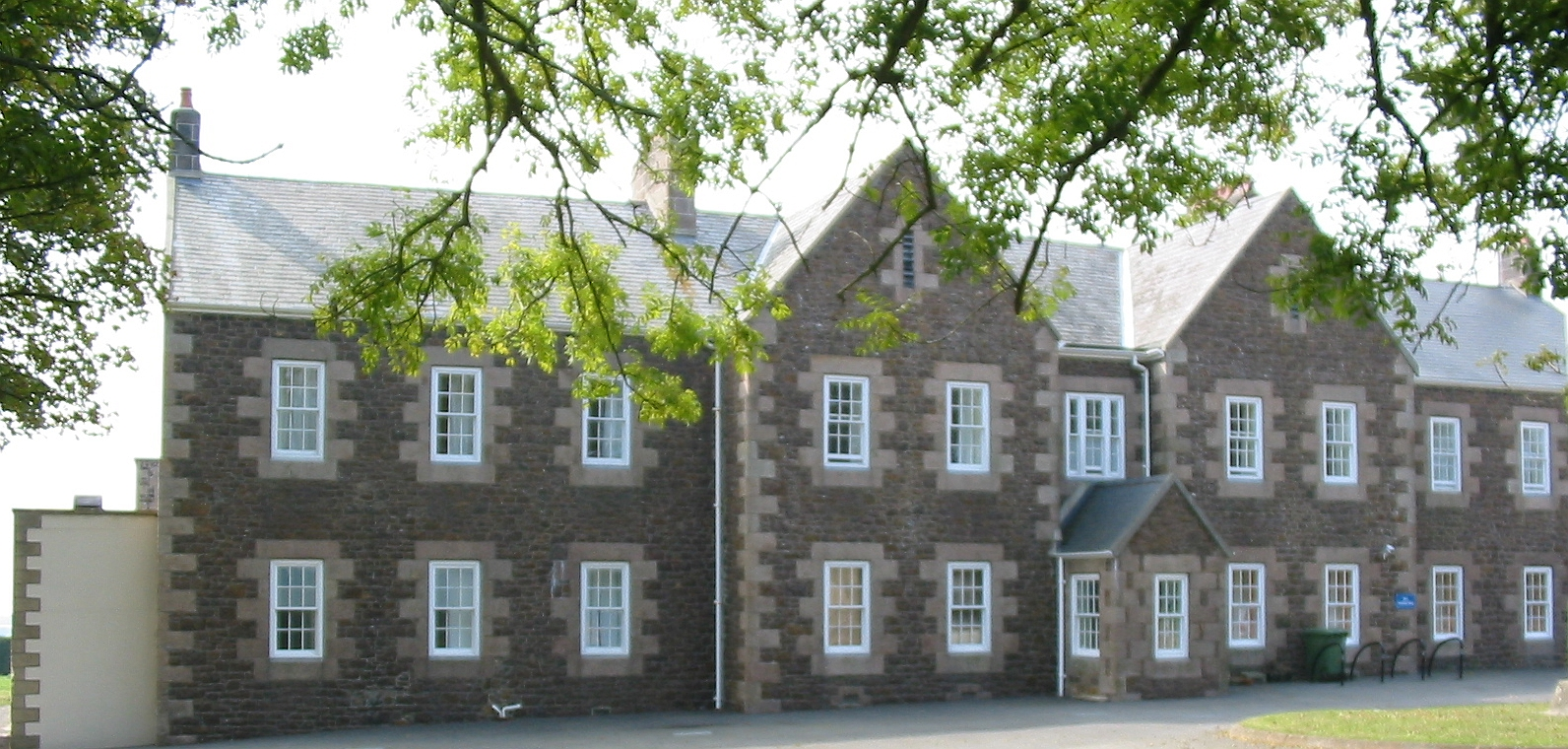
- Haut de la Garenne (La Rue de la Pouclée et des Quatre Chemins frontage)

- Location within Channel Islands Location within Jersey
- Former names: Haut de la Garenne, Industrial School, Jersey Home for Boys.

General information
- Status: Completed
- Location: La Rue de la Pouclée et des Quatre Chemins, Parish of St. Martin, Jersey
- Coordinates: 49.201389°N 2.026944°W
- Opened: 22 June 1867
- Owner: States of Jersey

Website
- jerseyhostel.co.uk

The Jersey Accommodation and Activity Centre is a building just north of Gorey in the parish of Saint Martin, Jersey, in the Channel Islands. It was formerly known as the Industrial School, the Jersey Home for Boys, and Haut de la Garenne. Its previous uses have included being an industrial school, a children's home, a military signal station, a television filming location, and a youth hostel. In 2008 it became the focus of the largest investigation into child abuse ever conducted in Jersey.

== History ==
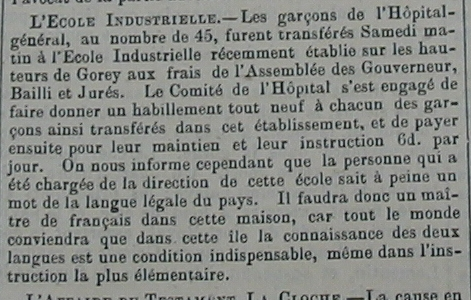
An account of the opening of the industrial school in 1867 in La Nouvelle Chronique de Jersey

Haut de la Garenne began in 1867 as an Industrial school for "young people of the lower classes of society and neglected children". The construction of the school was funded at a cost of £2,410 by the Assembly of Governor, Bailiff and Jurats in order to house and educate boys formerly looked after at the General Hospital in Saint Helier. On 22 June 1867, 45 boys were transferred by coach to the new institution, overseen by Jurats Neel and Aubin, Charles Simon, director of the hospital, and Mr. Higginbottom, master of the new school.

By 1900 it had become the Jersey Home for Boys and continued as a children's home for many years. In 1921 the States of Jersey took over the buildings and most of the powers of the Assembly of Governor, Bailiff and Jurats. During the German Occupation during the Second World War, the German military used the building as a signal station. Following the Liberation of 1945, the building continued as a children's home with responsibility being taken over by the Education Committee. On 17 March 1960 the States adopted an act changing the name of the institution to Haut de la Garenne. Throughout the 1960s and 1970s the home received both boys and girls, but as care policy developed the number of children in care was reduced from 1970 onwards. A new wing for staff accommodation was built on the western part of the site in 1970. After the home closed in 1986, the building was used to portray a police station in the TV detective series Bergerac.

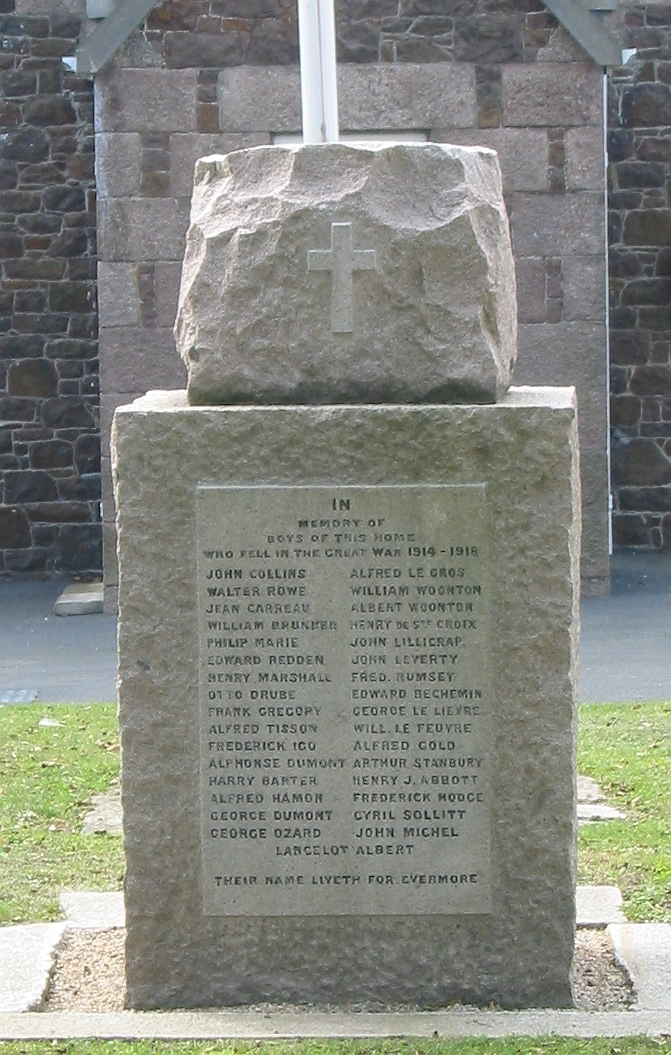
The memorial standing in front of the building records the names of those former pupils who fell in the First World War

The Public Works Committee took over the building from the Education Committee in 1986. The building was put to a number of temporary uses while a permanent solution to using the building was considered. It was considered as a potential site for the Territorial Army unit. St. Michael's Preparatory School leased a dormitory block for a time, and the headmaster proposed leasing the whole site for educational and sporting purposes. In 1989 the dormitory wing was converted for use by the Education Committee as temporary respite care for children with special education needs. However the Public Works Committee decided in favour of selling the property in order to purchase a commercial site in Saint Helier for development as housing, or of agreeing a land swap with a hotel in Saint Helier whereby the hotel would develop Haut de la Garenne as a luxury hotel and thereby free the urban hotel site for housing development. The proposal for a luxury hotel development spurred parishioners of Saint Martin to call a Parish Assembly by means of a requête. This Assembly, held in August 1989, voted to oppose a hotel development at Haut de la Garenne, but indicated that a proposal for a sheltered housing development might be acceptable.

In 1991 the States approved a scheme to retain the 1970 wing for respite care, convert the main building for sheltered housing, and construct new housing on the eastern part of the site. This decision was reversed, and in 1992 the Planning and Environment Committee took over administration of the site from Public Services, and the building was used for temporary accommodation for visiting groups of musicians and sportspeople, especially during festivals. Discussions continued on how to use the 2,137 square metres (23,000 sq ft) of available building floor area.

On 8 December 1998 the States voted to establish a trust to manage and operate Haut de la Garenne as a residential centre. On 22 October 2002 the States adopted a Law granting an Act of Incorporation to the Association called "The Haut de la Garenne Trust".

The States spent £2.25m in 2003 to convert the building into a youth hostel, part of the Youth Hostels Association (England & Wales) (YHA). The youth hostel opened for business on 19 March 2004. The building was also used for occasional conferences.

=== Child abuse investigation ===
Police moved into the hostel in February 2008 as part of an investigation into historical child abuse. The investigation showed numerous instances of child abuse against past residents, and led to the conviction of a former resident and a former member of staff.

Initial reports suggested that human remains and other evidence of torture and murder had been found. These reports were later denied by the police.

The hostel closed as the police investigation commenced and YHA indicated that they did not wish to re-use the premises. The building was subsequently used for accommodation for military units visiting Jersey.

In 2011, American journalist Leah McGrath Goodman was banned from the UK for two years while doing research on the abuse allegations. Politicians such as John Hemming and Trevor Pitman attempted to get the ban lifted so she could finish her work and publish her findings. The ban was lifted in 2013.

In July 2013, a major inquiry into the allegations led by a senior UK judge was announced. In its report in July 2017 the inquiry recommended that Haut de la Garenne be demolished as it was a reminder of an "unhappy past or shameful history".

== Current use ==
In April 2011 it was relaunched under a new branding as the Jersey Accommodation and Activity Centre.

The Jersey Accommodation and Activity Centre offers bed and breakfast accommodation as a hub for activity holidays in Jersey. The building is also intended to act as a learning centre, offering classes in business and administration, cookery, environmental studies and other subjects. The facility also provides meeting rooms for charities, sports clubs and associations, and acts as a venue for arts, crafts and dance. The facility is run jointly by two companies, Jersey Adventures and Jersey Odyssey.

As of September 2025, it is also used for music lessons, under the Da Capo School of Performing Arts.

== Toponymy ==
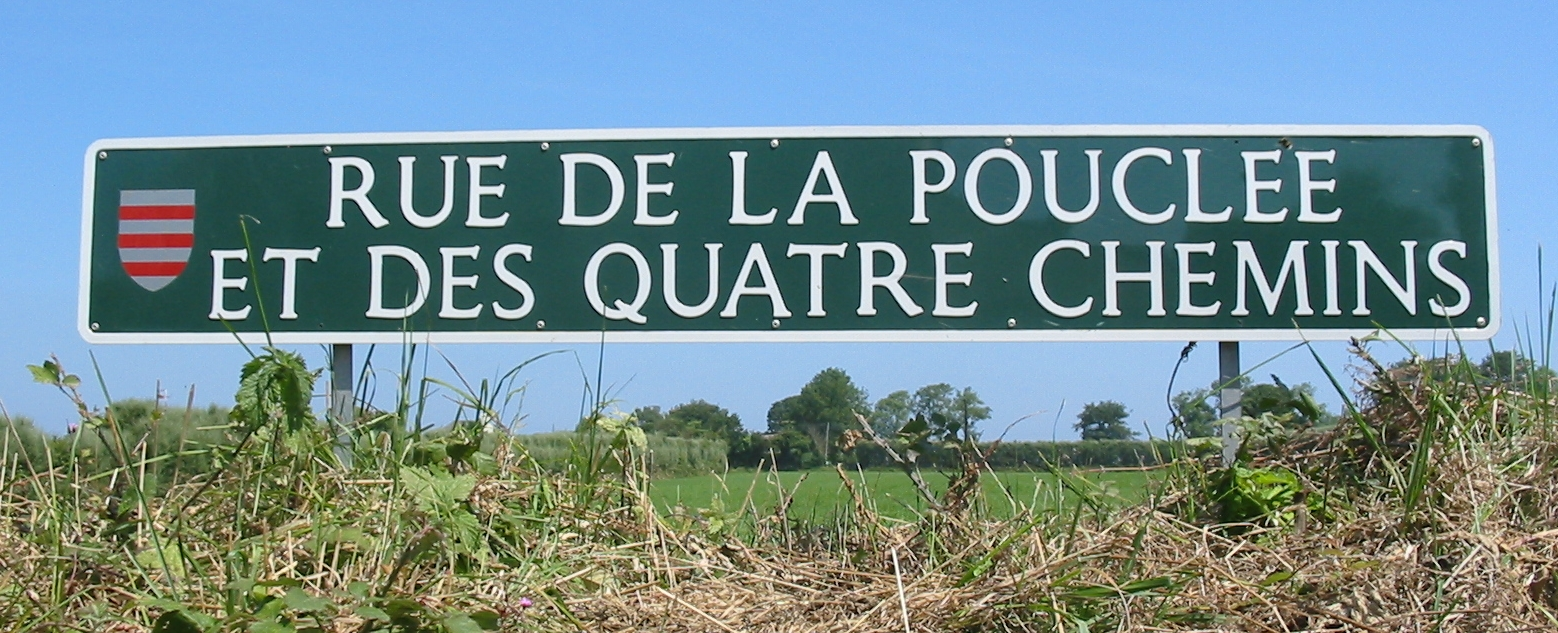
Haut de la Garenne is in La Rue de la Pouclée et des Quatre Chemins, Saint Martin.

Haut de la Garenne is French for top of the warren. The building is situated on Mont de la Garenne, a hill overlooking Mont Orgueil where rabbits were hunted. This varenne of the King was a perquisite (privilege) of the Crown.
