= Vingtaine de Rozel =

Vingtaine in Saint Martin, Jersey

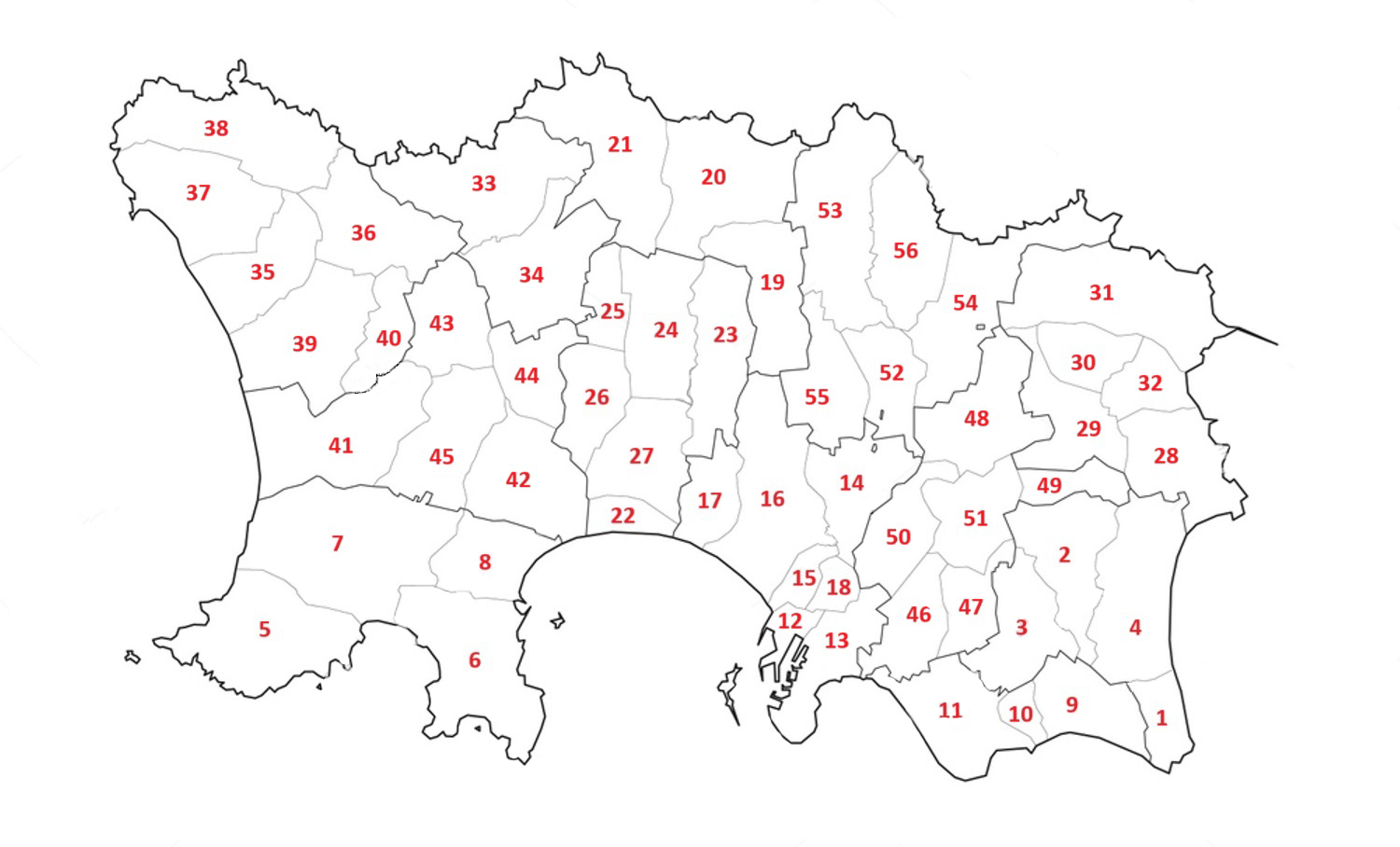
Rozel with numbers 31 (St Martin) and 54 (Trinity) on map

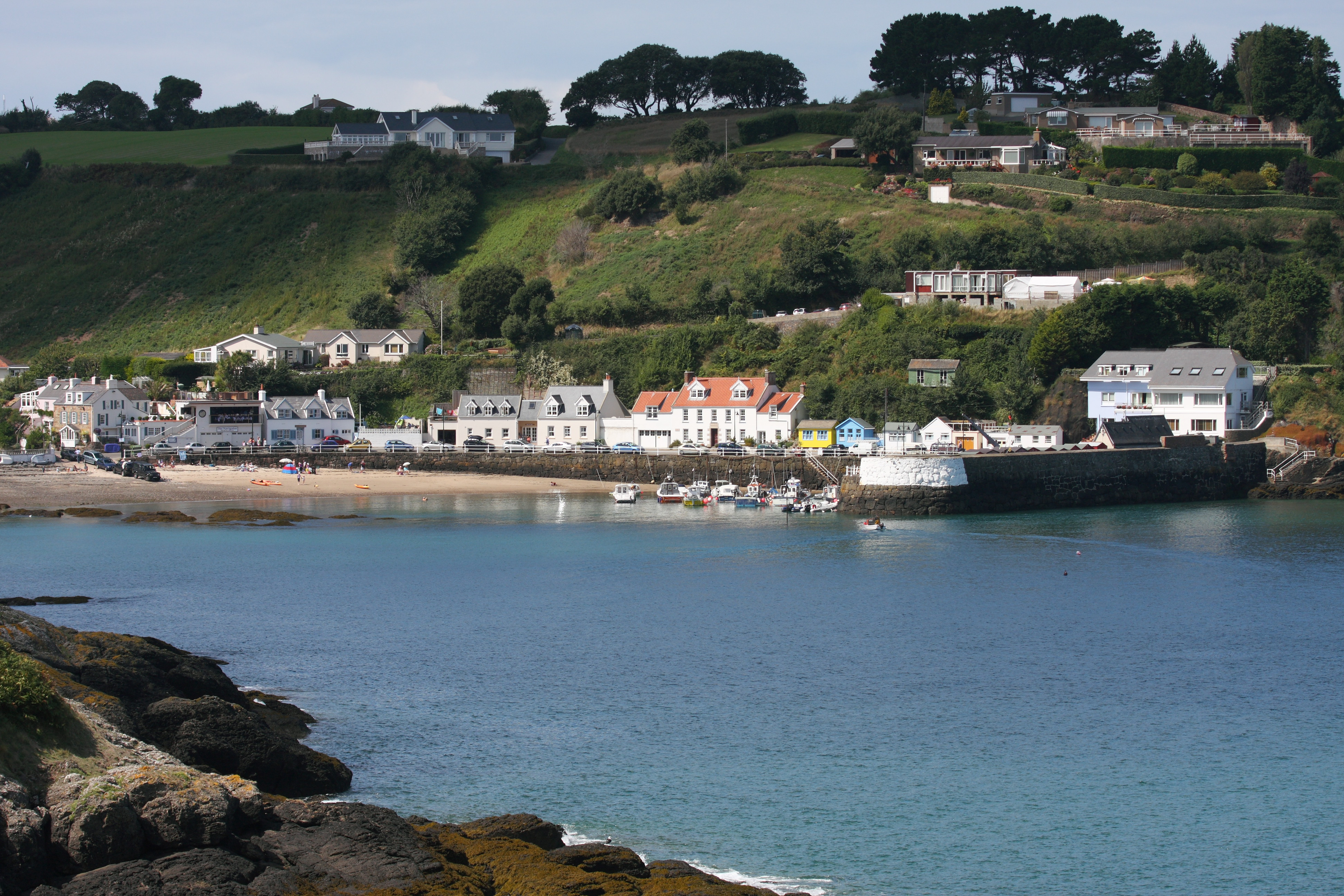
Rozel harbour

Rozel is a place name describing two identically named and bordering vingtaines in the Channel Island of Jersey- the eastern Vingtaine de Rozel of St Martin and the western Vingtaine de Rozel of Trinity.

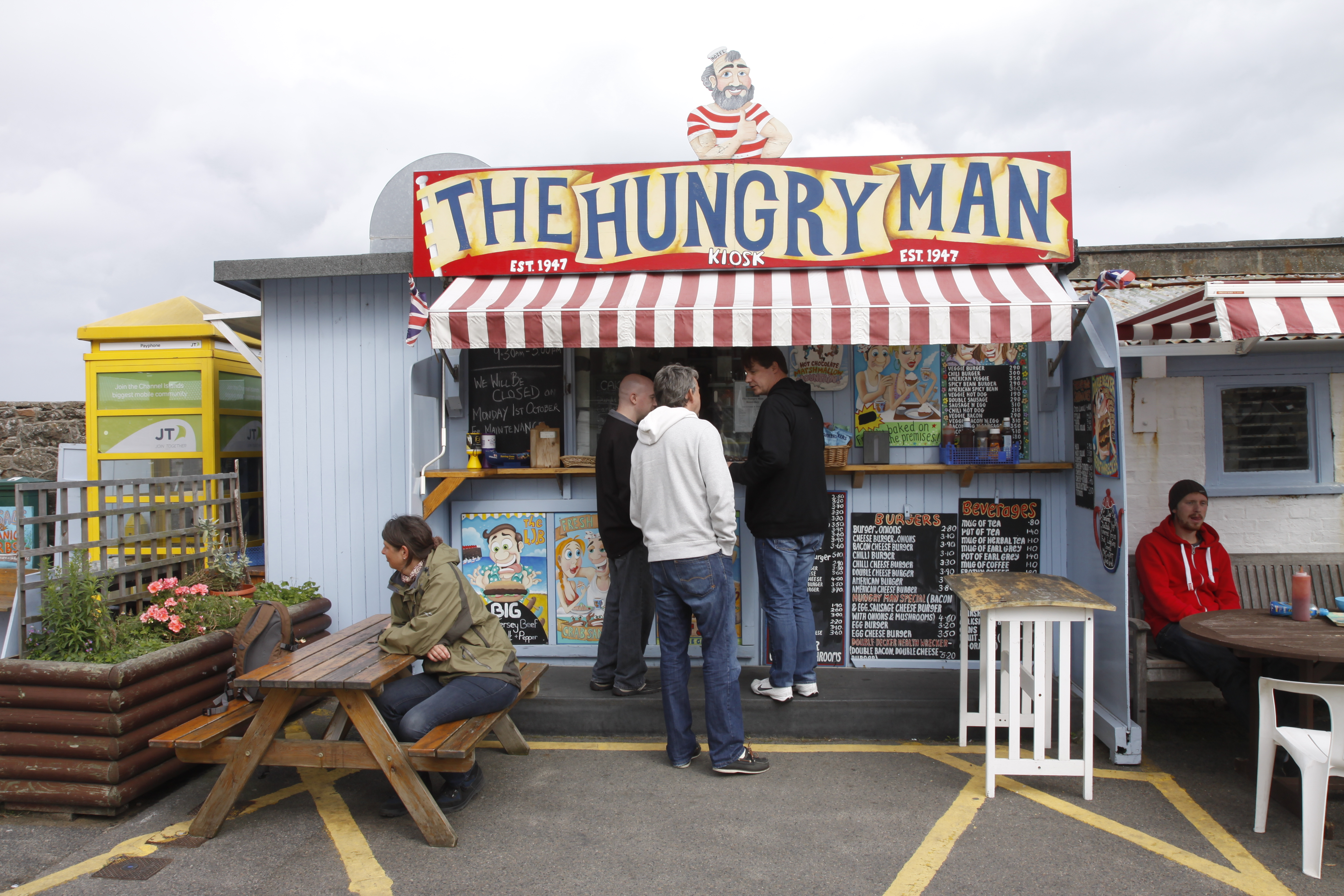
The Hungry Man in the harbour of Rozel (Jersey).

Situated on the north east coast of Jersey, the vingtaines are most well known for the quaint cove situated on the border between St Martin and Trinity known as Rozel Bay. In 1829 a harbour was built for the increasing number of vessels involved in the oyster dredging fishery which eventually collapsed at the end of the 19th century.

Le Câtel de Rozel lies on a headland to the north of Rozel Bay in Trinity, and is an early fort with signs of Neolithic and Iron Age occupation.

During the Napoleonic era, a fort was built on the headland to the north of the harbour and was backed by a garrison stationed at Le Couperon barracks in Rozel Bay. The barracks were built in 1810, sold to a private owner in 1924 and converted into a hotel run by the Sharp family in the 1950s. The property is now a private residential complex.

Le Moulin de Rozel was a mill built in 1799, dismantled in 1916 and later converted to an artillery observation post by the Germans in the occupation of the Channel Islands. Now a Jersey listed building, the mill serves as a maritime navigation mark.

Chateau La Chaire lies in a valley where Samuel Curtis built a house and established a botanical garden in 1841. In 2002 research was undertaken in recreating the "lost garden" and several Eden project style schemes were put forward, however the Samuel Curtis Garden Project fell into abeyance in January 2004.

== Other vingtaines ==
Other vingtaines of St Martin and Trinity include Vingtaine de Faldouet; Vingtaine du Fief de la Reine; Vingtaine de l'Eglise and Vingtaine de la Queruee (St Martin) and Vingtaine de la Ville-à-l'Évêque; Vingtaine du Rondin; Vingtaine des Augrès and Vingtaine de la Croiserie (Trinity).
