= St Martin, Jersey =

Parish in north-eastern Jersey

St Martin Saint Martîn (Norman)
- Jersey parish
- Parish of St Martin
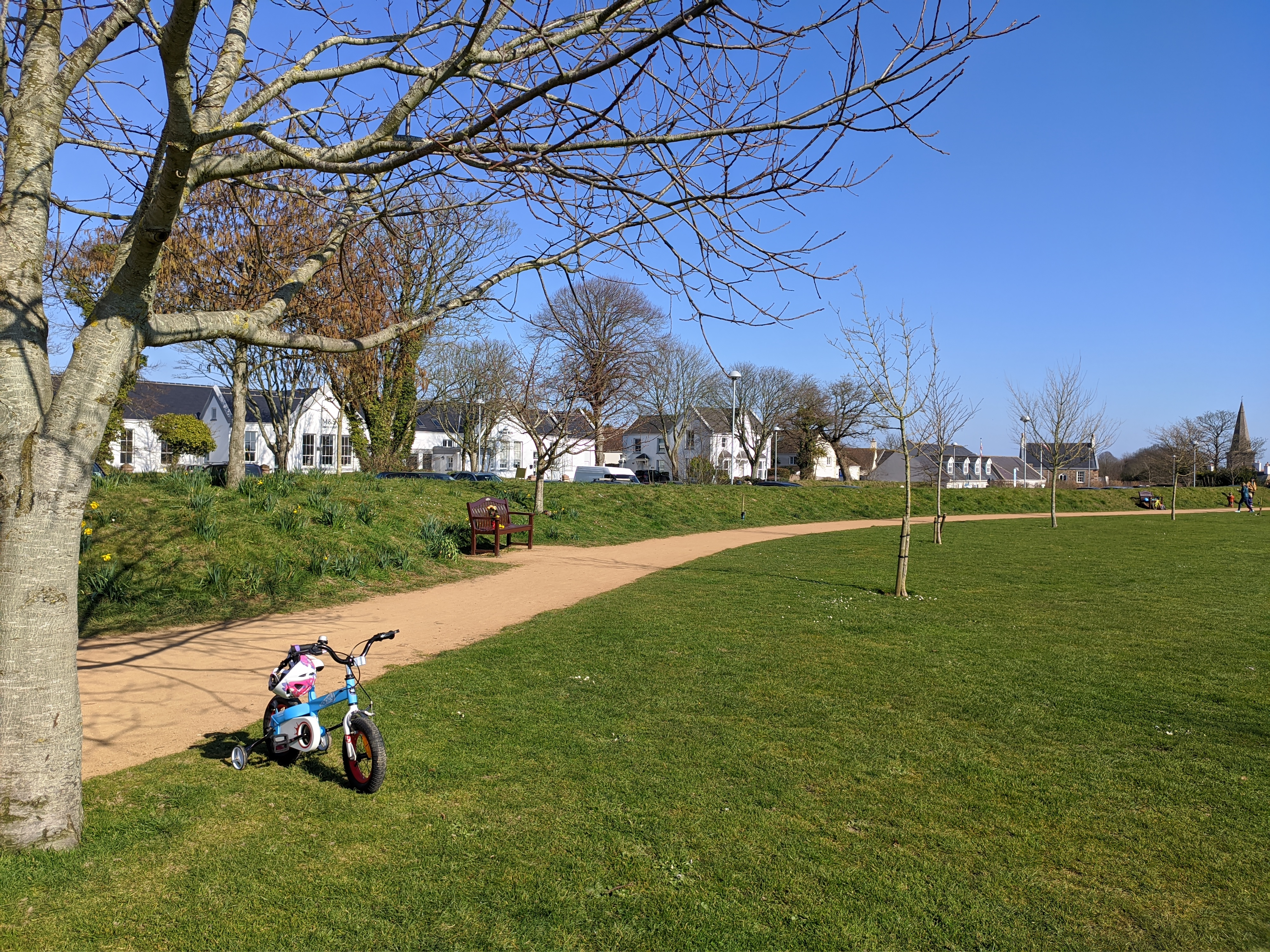
- St Martin's Village, including (from left to right) the la Vielle École (village shopping centre), Public Hall and Parish Church. In the foreground is the village green.

- Flag Coat of arms

- Location of St Martin in Jersey
- Coordinates: 49°13′05″N 2°03′05″W
- Crown Dependency: Jersey, Channel Islands
- Headquarters: Public Hall, St Martin's Village

Government
  - Connétable: Karen Shenton-Stone

Area
  - Total: 10.3 km^{2} (4.0 sq mi)
  - Rank: Ranked 6th

Population (2021)
  - Total: 3,948
  - Density: 383/km^{2} (993/sq mi)
- Time zone: GMT
  - Summer (DST): UTC+01
- Postcode district: JE3
- Postcode sector: 6
- Website: parish.gov.je/stmartin/

St Martin (Jèrriais: Saint Martîn) is one of the twelve parishes of Jersey in the Channel Islands. It lies 5.5 kilometres (3.4 mi) north-east of St Helier and has a population of 3,948. The parish covers an area 10.3 km^{2} (4.0 sq mi).

The parish is a mixed rural-urban community and forms the north-east corner of the Jersey rectangle. It has the easternmost point of the Bailiwick. Most of the population is concentrated in the villages of the parish, and along La Grande Route de Faldouet and the coast towards St Catherine's.

The village of Gorey is partly located in the parish, with the remainder of the village in Grouville. In Gorey, the parish hosts one of the three principal English military fortifications located in Jersey, Mont Orgeuil (Gorey) Castle. The village of Maufant is also partly located in St Martin, along the boundary with St Saviour.

== History ==
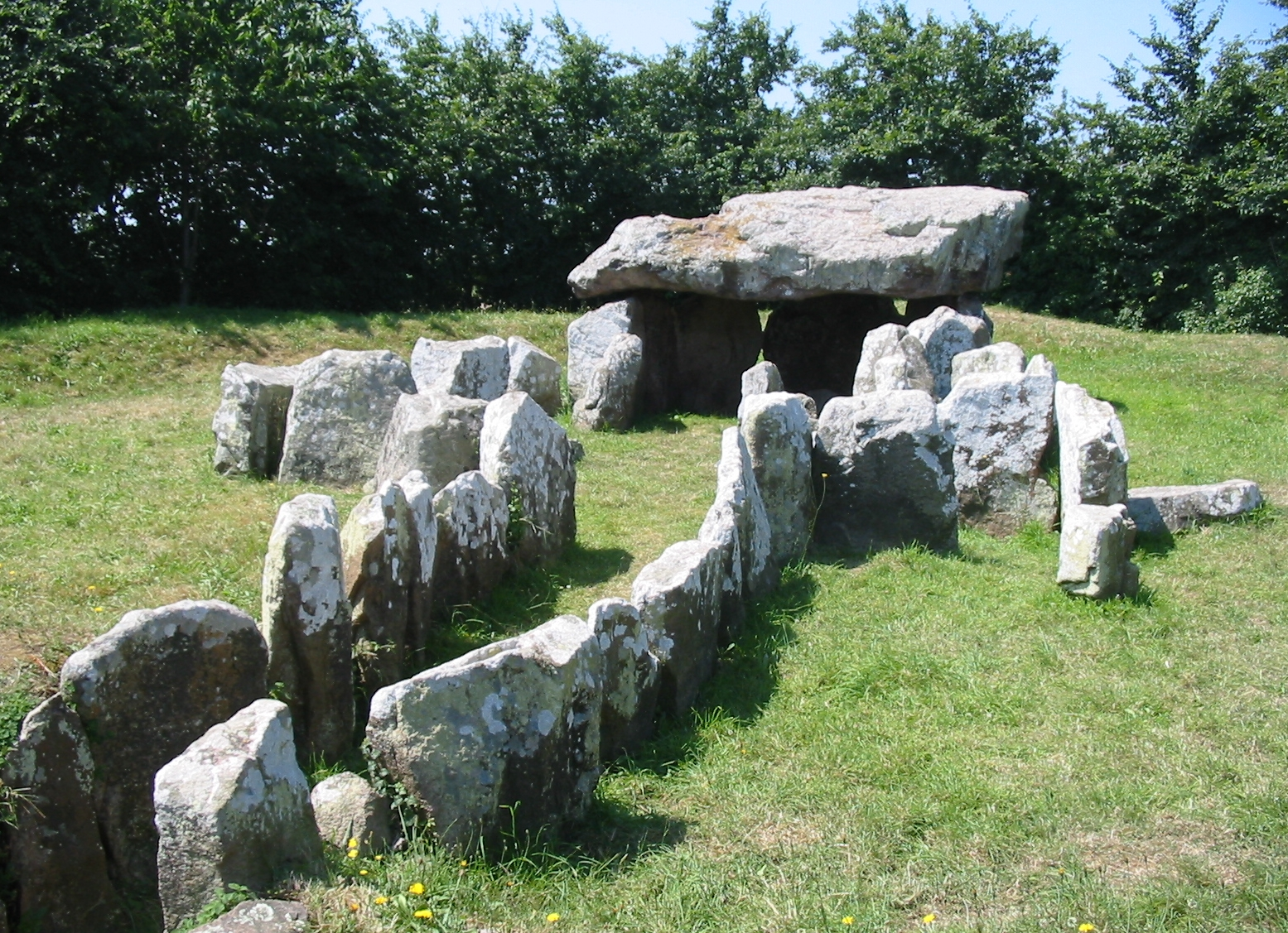
La Pouquelaye de Faldouet is one of the best preserved dolmens in Jersey

Historically it was called Saint-Martin-le-Vieux (Saint Martin the Old) to distinguish it from Saint-Martin-de-Grouville (known today as Grouville); this is why the parish coat of arms are so similar.

The dolmens at Le Couperon and Faldouet are among the prehistoric remains in the parish. La Pouquelaye de Faldouet features on the reverse of the Jersey ten pence coin and was the inspiration for the poem Nomen, numen, lumen written by Victor Hugo in 1855 during his exile in Jersey.

In 1689, William of Orange became the King of England; and England, as a Dutch ally, went to war against the French. Although due to the scale of the war, the island did not come into much focus, it was at this time that the Privilege of Neutrality, which had long been enjoyed by the islands, was lost. William banned all trade with France, a proclamation which applied to Jersey as well. However, due to corruption in the higher levels of Jersey's government, namely the Lieutenant-Governor himself Edward Harris, a large smuggling trade thrived, operating from the bailiwick. Smugglers would be alerted by a fire set by French merchants on the Écrehous reef, a part of Jersey's bailiwick, to which Jersey boats, under the approval of the Lieutenant-Governor, would travel to conduct illegal trade. Despite attempts from parish authorities to stop the boats, the fact that the reef was part of Jersey and that these boats had permission from the government to travel to the islets, no action could be taken.

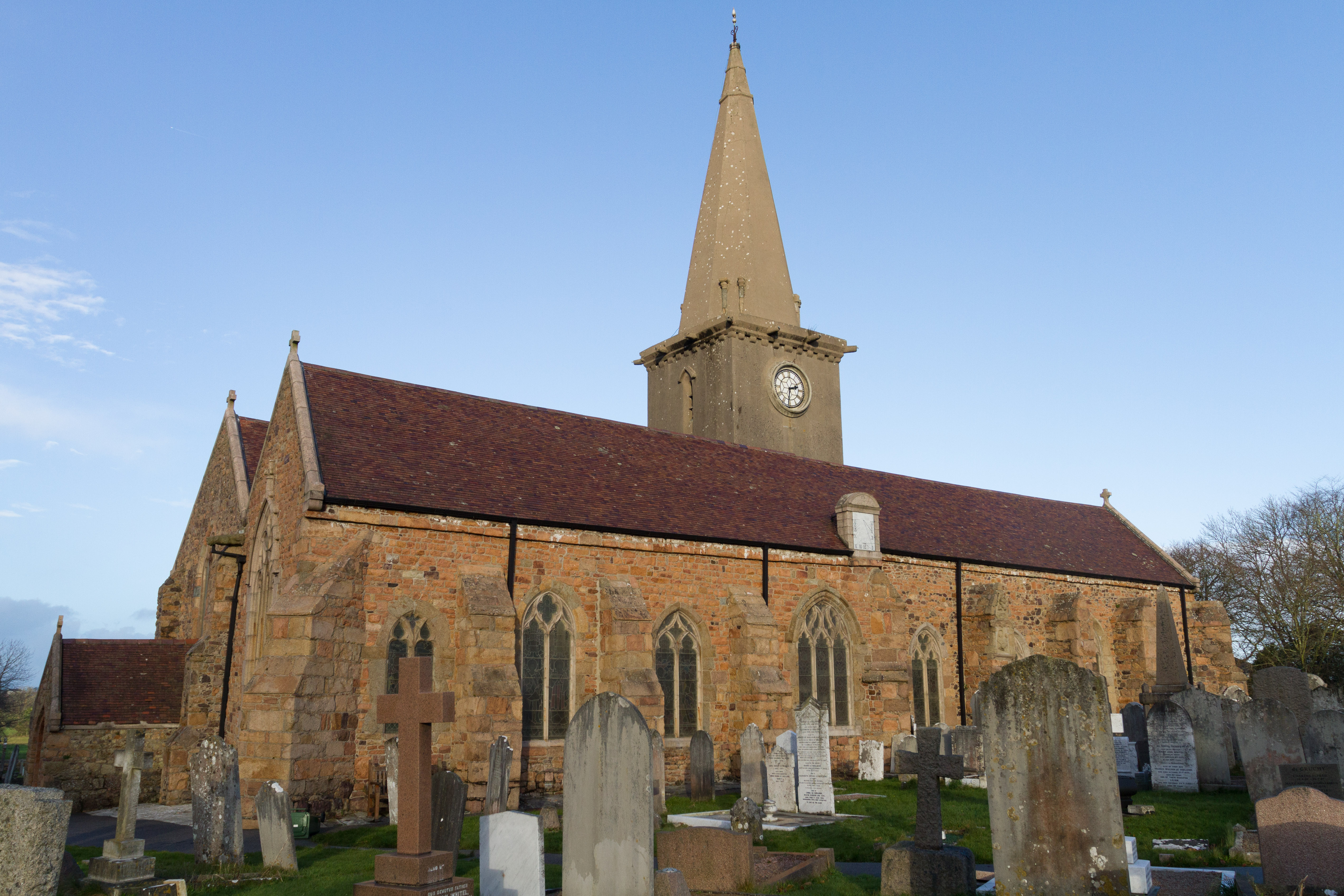
The parish church of St Martin Le Vieux , 2012

There is a significant oyster bed off the coast of Gorey. In the early 19th century, at least 2,000 men were employed in the industry at Gorey, and a number of cottages were built in the village to accommodate the new English residents. This also led to the construction of Gouray Church to provide English services for the residents (most of the Anglican services on the island at the time were delivered in French).^{:236}

The rock known as Le Saut Geffroy, or Geoffroy's Leap, is reputed to be an ancient place of execution where criminals were thrown into the sea. According to folklore, a man named Geffroy was condemned to be thrown into the sea. Remarkably, he survived and climbed back up the cliff face where an argument broke out among the mob of spectators. Some said that sentence had been duly carried out and that Geffroy should go free; others said that sentence had not been properly carried out. To settle the argument, and demonstrate his prowess, Geffroy dived off the rock, but perished on this occasion. Le Saut Geffroy is now preserved by the National Trust for Jersey.

== Governance ==
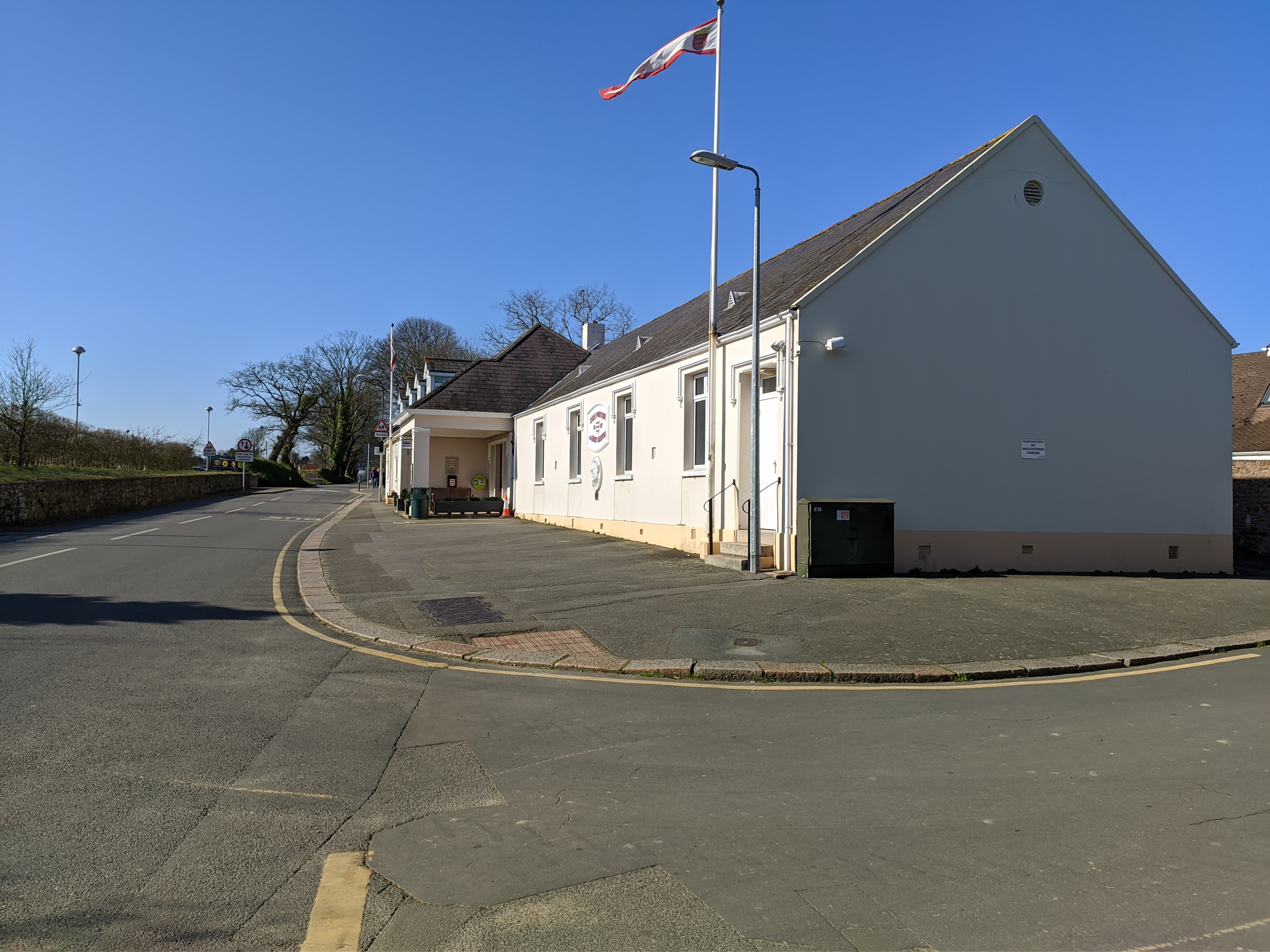
St Martin's Public Hall

The parish is a first-level administrative division of the Bailiwick of Jersey, a British Crown dependency. The highest official in the parish is the Connétable of St Martin. The incumbent office holder is Karen Shenton-Stone, who has held the office since 2018. The parish administration is headquartered at the Public Hall next to the village green. St Martin is the only parish in Jersey other than St Helier not to conduct its municipal business from a parish hall; it has a public hall instead, having accepted money from the States of Jersey to provide an assembly room.

The parish forms part of the North East electoral district consisting of St Martin and Grouville, which collectively elect three representatives (the least of any constituency) alongside the parishes' Connétables.

St Martin is divided into five vingtaines as follows:

- La Vingtaine de Rozel
- La Vingtaine de Faldouet
- La Vingtaine de la Quéruée
- La Vingtaine de l'Église
- La Vingtaine du Fief de la Reine.

== Geography ==
The 600m breakwater at St Catherine is all that remains of a grandiose harbour project started, but then abandoned, by the British government in the 19th century. It is now a popular site for sea anglers.

This is one of the most agricultural parishes, and one of the most sought after places to live in the island. It has the best herd of Jersey cattle, some of the largest potato growers and a number of small farmers now cultivating the new "Genuine Jersey", mainly organic, brand.

The main settlements in the parish are the villages of St Martin, Maufant and Gorey. Gorey is split with Grouville. The southern half of Maufant is located within St Martin, however the main road through the village is in St Saviour.

The Écréhous, small group of rocky islands, are also part of the parish.

=== Demography ===
Historical population
Year	Pop.	±%
1991	3,528	—
1996	3,423	−3.0%
2001	3,628	+6.0%
2011	3,763	+3.7%
2021	3,948	+4.9%

== Landmarks ==
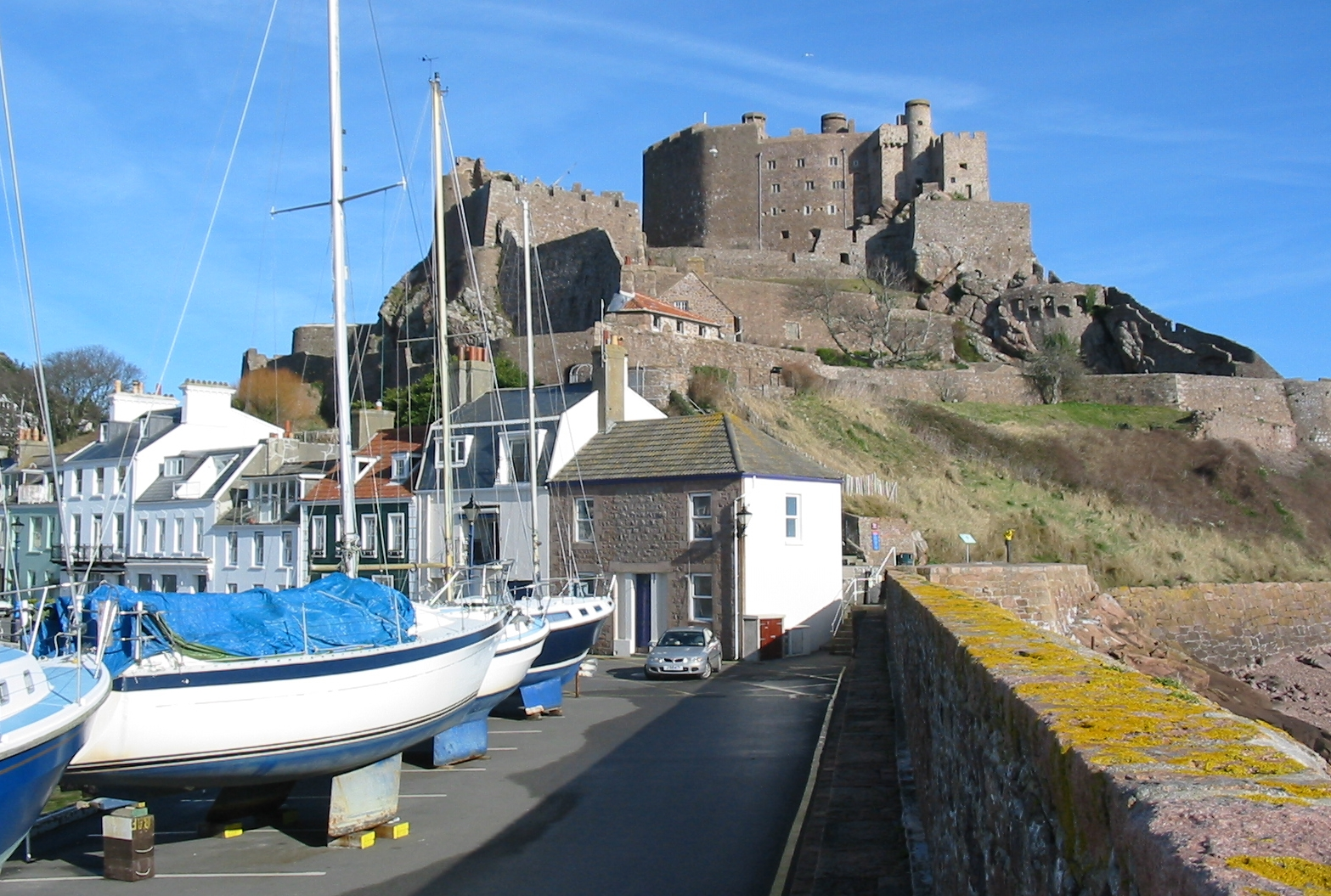
Mont Orgueil Castle

Mont Orgeuil is one of the two main castles in Jersey. First known as Gorey Castle and located near to Gorey Pier, it has existed for 800 years. The castle was subject to raids by the French in the 13th, 14th and 15th centuries. The castle served as the island's prison until a prison was constructed in St Helier in the 17th century. Among agitators imprisoned there by the British government were William Prynne and John Lilburne. Until the construction of Elizabeth Castle off St Helier at the beginning of the 17th century, Mont Orgueil was generally the residence of the Governor of Jersey.

== Transport ==
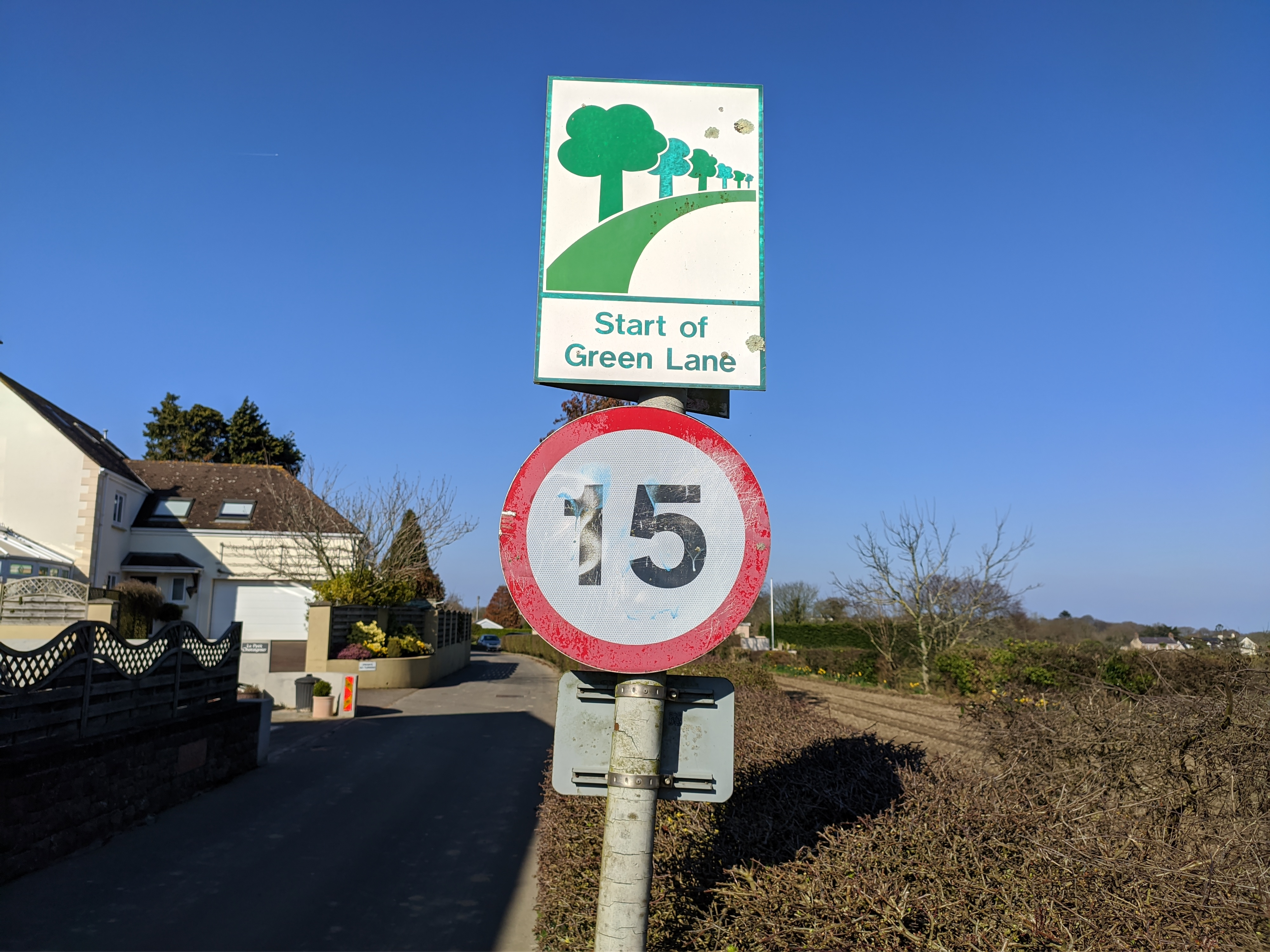
There are a large number of Green lanes in the parish

Gorey Pier is the eastern terminus of the A3 La Rue à Don, which is the main road linking the village to Grouville Church and to St Helier.

Gorey Pier was the eastern terminus for the Jersey Eastern Railway between 1891 and 1936.

As part of the Eastern Cycle Network plans, Gorey will be connected to St Helier with a direct off-main road cycle route. A cycle path was constructed along the side of La Rue à Don in the Grouville part of Gorey in 2011. Later on, the cycle lane was extended south along the Royal Golf Course, at a cost of £190,000, and north to connect to Gorey Pier along the coast.

St Martin has a very comprehensive green lane network, which are roads that have a 15 mph speed limit and priority is afforded to pedestrians, cyclists and horseriders. Most of the parish-owned by-roads are designated as green lanes. This compares to its neighbouring parishes St Saviour and Trinity, which have no green lanes, and Grouville, which has very few. In 2020, the Connétable Karen Shenton-Stone said St Martin had seen a huge increase in cycling during the COVID-19 lockdown.

== Culture ==
St Martin is one of the remaining strongholds of Jèrriais with a distinctive accent. The area around Faldouet formerly possessed a dialect of its own, known as Faldouais, of which the distinctive feature was the realisation of intervocalic /r/ as /z/. Although the Faldouais dialect is extinct, it has left notable amounts of writings in Jèrriais literature.

== Twin towns ==
St Martin is twinned with:

- (France) Montmartin-sur-Mer, Normandy.

== Notable people ==
- The artist Edmund Blampied was born at Ville Brée on 30 March 1886.
- The artist Frank Cadogan Cowper lived at The Studio, Les Blanches, St Martin from 1940 to 1944.
- The Jèrriais-language writer Amélia Perchard was born in Saint-Martin in 1921.
- Alphonse Le Gastelois – after being wrongfully accused of a crime, he lived in St Martin for 14 years.

== Gallery ==
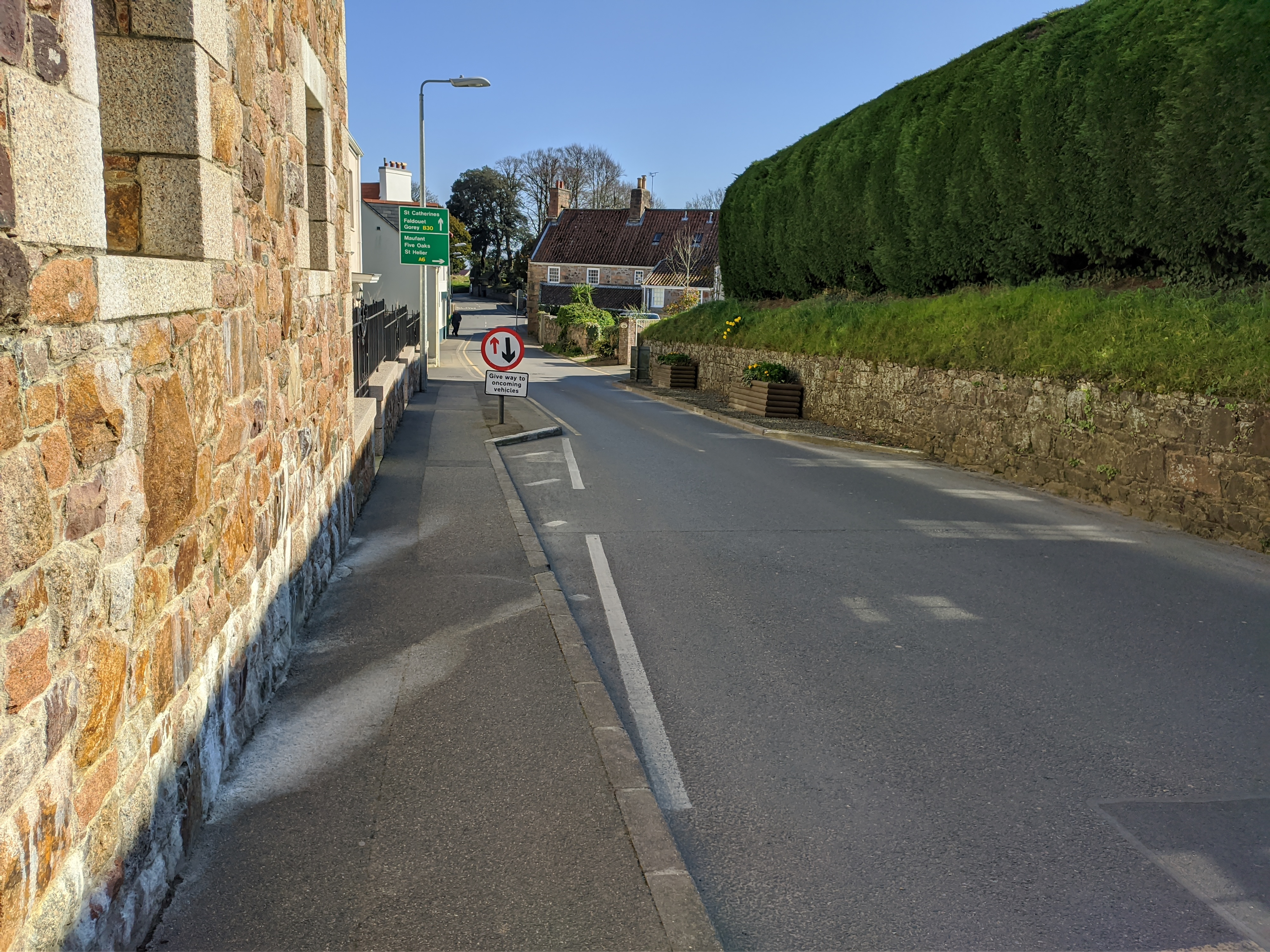
The main road through the village. The village has a large number of calming chicanes.

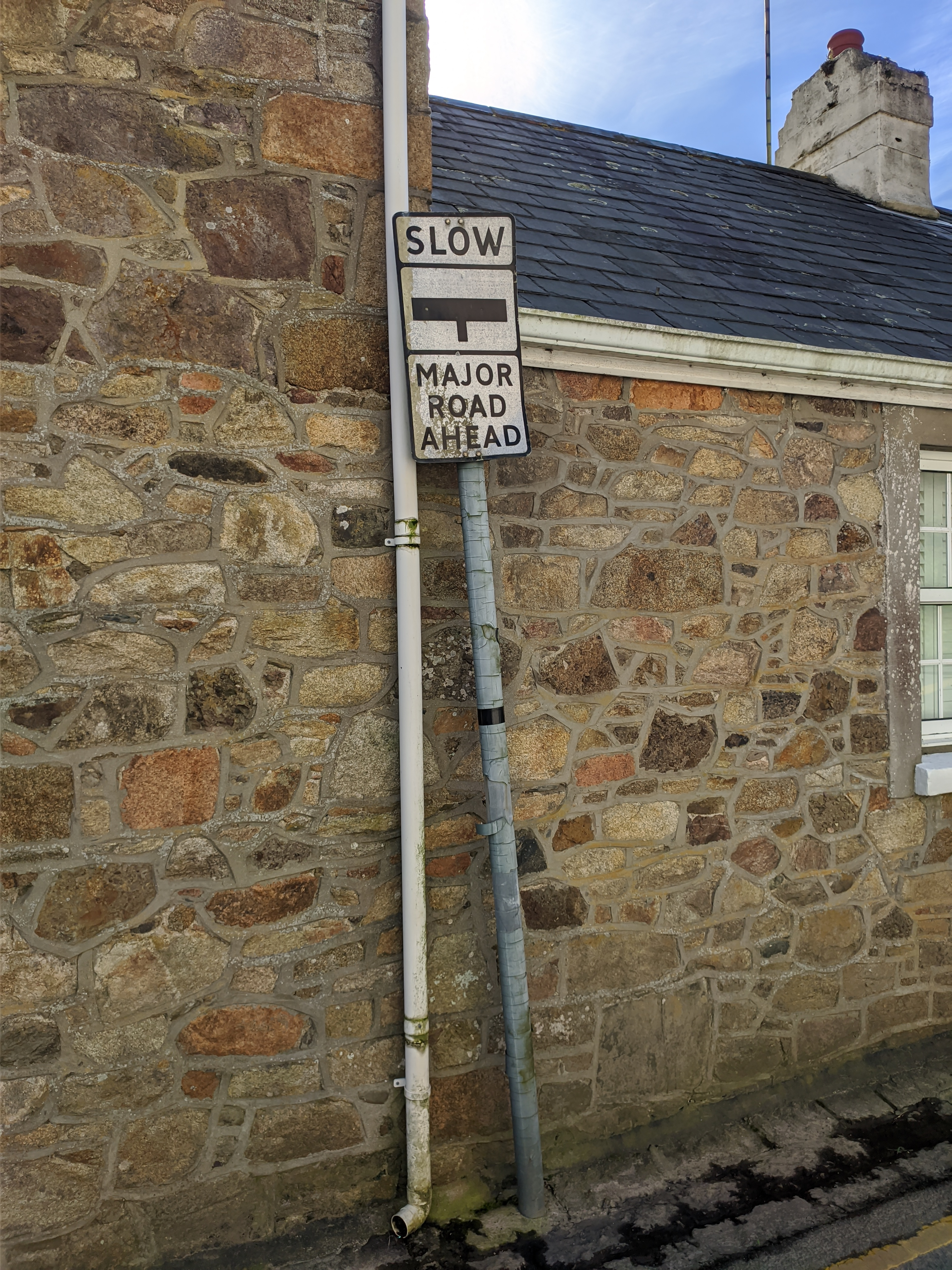
A pre-Worboys "SLOW MAJOR ROAD AHEAD" sign at Rozel bay

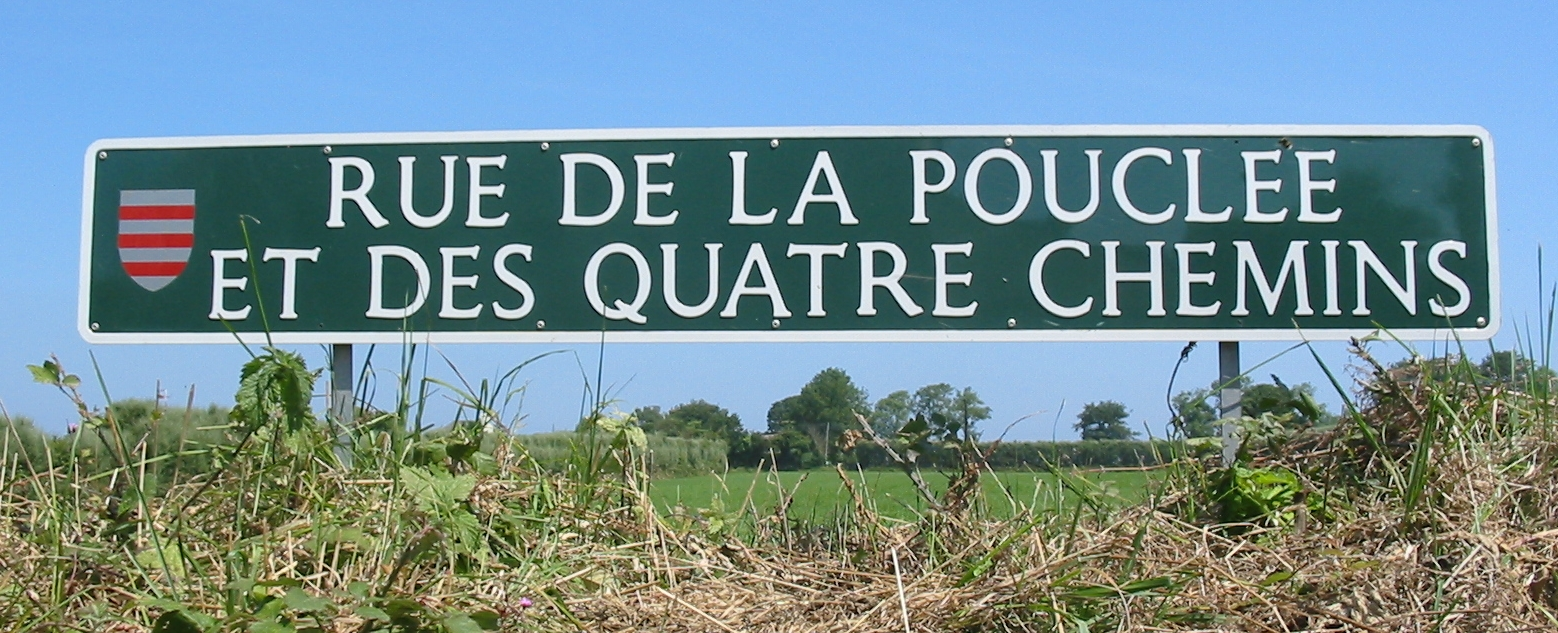
The road sign design in use in the parish. This is the longest road name in Jersey.

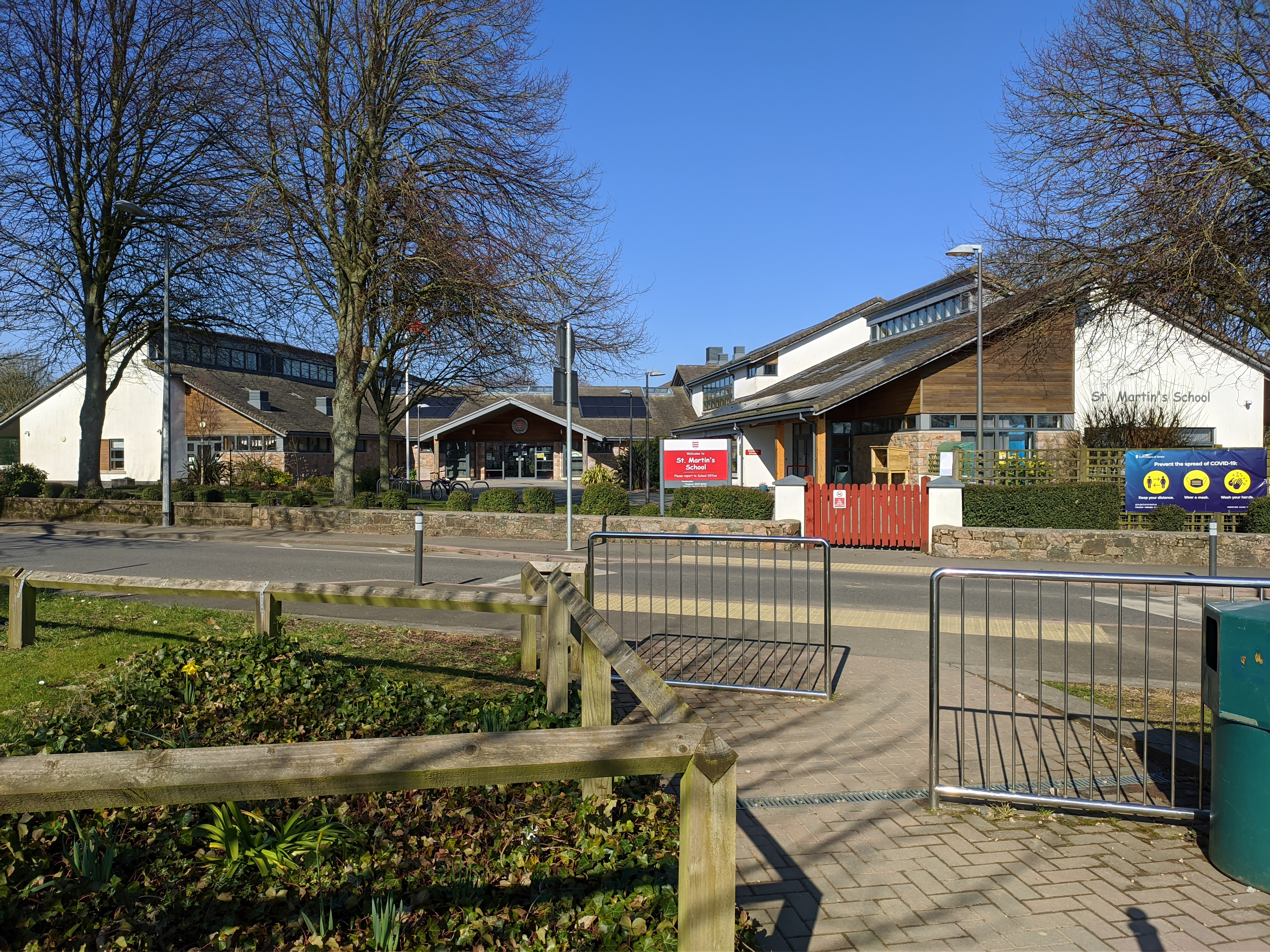
St Martin's school serves the parish, as well as the north of St Saviour. A new school was constructed in the 2010s.

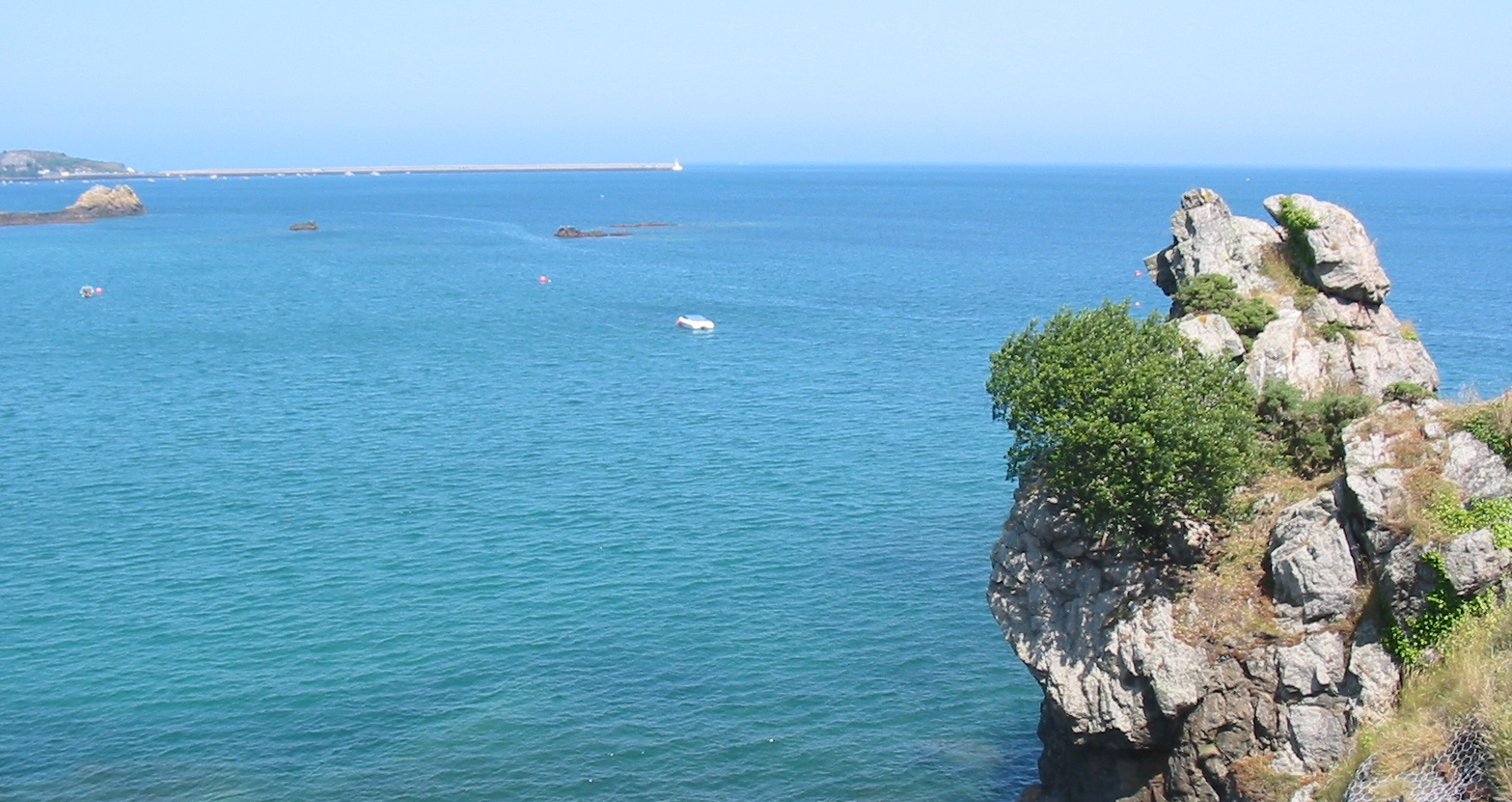
Le Saut Geffroy, or Geoffroy's Leap, can be seen here at right, and in the background stretches St. Catherine's breakwater

== See also ==
- Haut de la Garenne
- Our Lady of the Annunciation Church, Jersey
