= Vingtaine de Faldouet =

Vingtaine in Saint Martin, Jersey

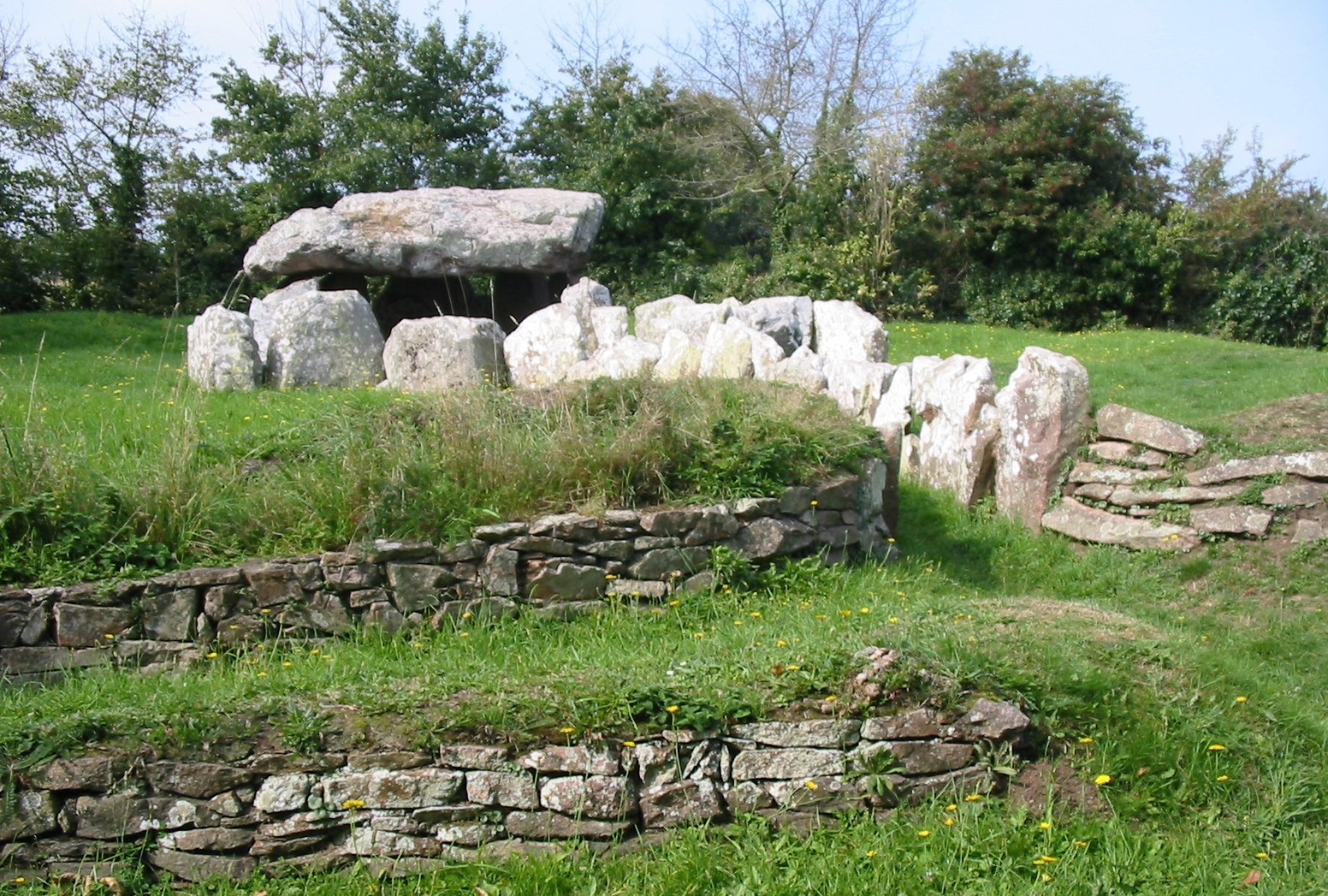
La Pouquelaye de Faldouet dolmen

Vingtaine de Faldouet is one of the five vingtaines of St Martin in the Channel Island of Jersey. The vingtaine is situated in the north-east of the parish, bordering the coast.

The Vingtenier de Faldouet is currently Mr S L Falle as enrolled through the Honorary Police of St Martin. The Connétable of St Martin is Ms K Shenton Stone, as elected unopposed in the 2018 Jersey General Election.

Notable places in the vingtaine include Faldouet dolmen which inspired several lines in Victor Hugo's Les Contemplations, written during his exile in Jersey during the 19th century. "The Channel Islands do not have the temples of Astypaleus, but they have their cromlechs." Other sites of interest include Ransoms, a family-run plant nursery and garden centre which opened in 1965 and Victoria Tower, a British fortress completed in 1837. St Saviour's Hospital, a vacant asset of the Government of Jersey property portfolio is also situated in the vingtaine.

== See also ==
- Vingtaine de Rozel
- Vingtaine de la Queruee
- Vingtaine du Fief de la Reine
- Vingtaine de l'Eglise
