= Jersey child abuse investigation =

Child abuse scandal

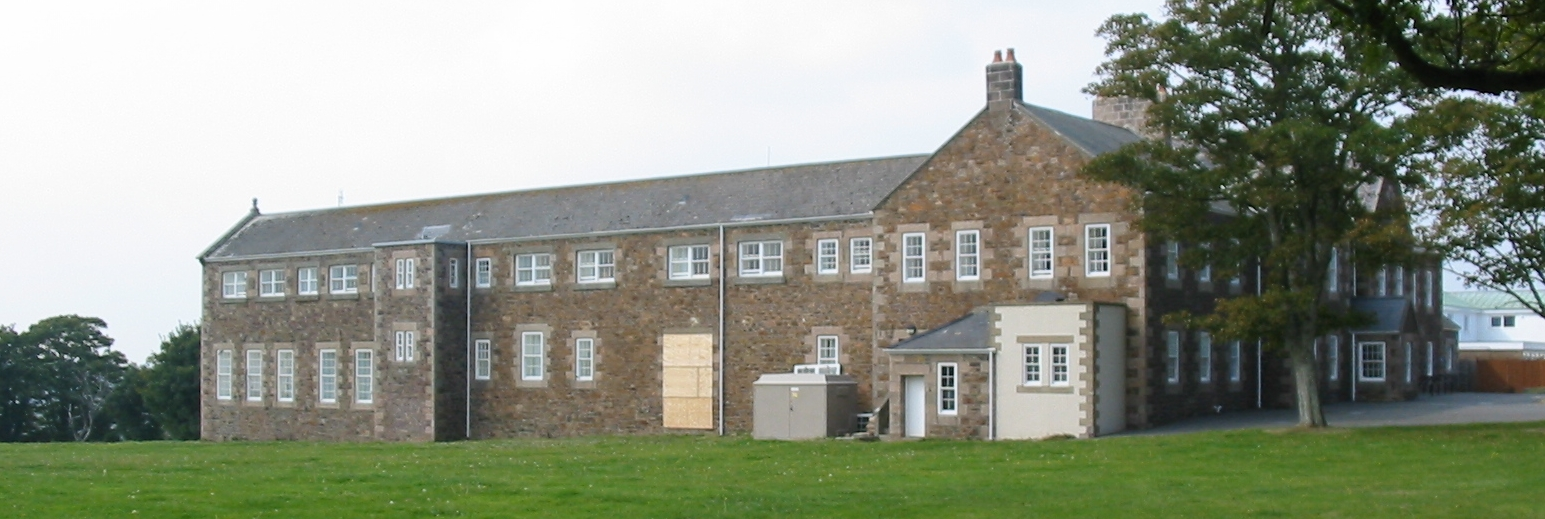
Side view of Haut de la Garenne in 2008. Part of the façade is boarded up following the forensic excavations in the building.

An investigation into historic child abuse in Jersey started in the spring of 2007. Before that, social worker Simon Bellwood had made a complaint about a "'Dickensian' system" where children as young as 11 were routinely locked up for 24 hours or more in solitary confinement in a secure unit where he worked. The wider investigation into child abuse over several decades became public in November that year. It received international attention when police moved in on Haut de la Garenne, then being used as a youth hostel.

== Investigation ==
A wide-ranging government investigation into child abuse had begun in 2006, and escalated into a States of Jersey Police investigation in 2007 during which witness evidence repeatedly indicated Haut de la Garenne, which housed up to 60 children at any one time, to be one of the places where abuse took place.

There was widespread media coverage as forensic teams conducted searches in the building between the end of February 2008 and July 2008.

An initial finding of a fragment of what was believed to be a child's skull was widely publicised, but forensic tests later confirmed that the finding was irrelevant. It later transpired that the forensic team had informed the police prior to the announcement of the discovery of supposed human remains that the item might predate the inquiry timeframe, being from infill from a graveyard or of prehistoric origin. In February 2009 States of Jersey Police sent the fragment to Kew Gardens in the UK for testing. In May 2009 the Kew experts stated that the fragment was a piece of endocarp of Cocos nucifera, i.e. a piece of coconut.

By the end of the excavations and investigations at Haut de la Garenne in July 2008, police had sifted over 150 tonnes of earth. 65 human milk teeth were found, coming from between 10 and 65 individuals aged between 6–12 years and generally seeming to have been shed naturally. Discounting a large quantity of animal bones, only three bone fragments, the largest of which was 25 mm (1 inch), were identified as possibly human; two of them have been dated to a range from 1470 to 1650 and the other 1650 to 1950.

=== Change of investigation team ===
In September 2008, Detective Superintendent Mick Gradwell of Lancashire Police took over as Senior Investigating Officer in the abuse enquiry. In August 2008 David Warcup, Deputy Chief Constable of Northumbria Police, took over as Deputy Chief Officer of the States of Jersey Police. The new team launched a review of the investigation to date.

In November 2008, the Deputy Chief Officer, David Warcup, expressed "much regret" that misleading information had been released throughout the conduct of the enquiry, although this has been bitterly contested. Warcup stated that there was "no evidence" of any child murders at Haut de la Garenne, although the Sunday Times and other media have pointed out that the original investigation had also made this point, nor was there any indication that bodies may have been destroyed at the property. He said that initial reports of blood spots, secret underground chambers, mysterious pits, and metal restraint shackles, were all innocuous or misidentified.

In March 2008, BBC television personality Jimmy Savile started legal proceedings against The Sun newspaper which had, wrongly he claimed, linked him in several articles to the child abuse scandal at Haut de la Garenne. Savile initially denied visiting Haut de la Garenne, but later admitted that he had done so, following the publication of a photograph showing him at the home surrounded by children. The States of Jersey Police said that in 2008 an allegation of an indecent assault by Savile at the home in the 1970s had been investigated, but there had been insufficient evidence to proceed. After his death, hundreds of people from all over the UK came forward to accuse him of past abuse. Several people from Haut de la Garenne also came forward at this time.

In 2012, it was alleged that the deceased actor Wilfrid Brambell had abused two boys aged 12–13 in Jersey, during the 1970s. One of the boys was from the Haut de la Garenne children's home.

== Charges ==
Jersey Police have so far recorded claims of abuse from 100 people. The police investigated 18 key suspects in the wider investigation, but the Attorney General stated in 2009 that a significant number of these complaints were unsuitable for the criminal courts, including "being made to take cold showers, being clipped around the ear, slapped about the head and flicked with a wet towel". Arrests and charges have been made and as of August 2009 the investigation continues. However the police have stated that there will not be the number of prosecutions which were originally reported, and Detective Superintendent Gradwell stated in August 2009 that the problems with the handling of the inquiry before he took over had "generated a very high level of expectation among complainants and the public" that "a large number of people would be prosecuted". Out of six files received by the prosecution lawyers in August 2008, charges were laid in respect of three of them and it was concluded by June 2009 that no charges would be brought in respect of the remaining three for "legal and evidential reasons" as explained by the Attorney General. Detective Superintendent Gradwell stated in August 2009 that all the police officers from the UK working with the States police had agreed with decisions made by the Attorney General, lawyers and the independent legal team about cases submitted for prosecution, but that "a few more people are likely to be charged". On 27 February 2010 a married couple from Scotland were charged with a number of common assaults on children while they were working at Haut de la Garenne in the 1970s and 1980s.

== Trials ==
In May 2009, Michael Aubin, then 46, admitted in the Royal Court of Jersey two counts of gross indecency and two counts of indecent assault on children under 10 years old while he himself was a child resident of Haut de la Garenne. He was sentenced on 22 June 2009 to two years' probation, having spent 19 months on remand. The trial was presided over by Royal Court Commissioner Julian Clyde-Smith.

In August 2009, Gordon Claude Wateridge, then 78, was found guilty of eight counts of indecent assault and one count of assault but acquitted on 11 counts of indecent assault and one count of incitement to indecent assault, all relating to his time as a residential carer at Haut de la Garenne in the 1970s. Royal Court Commissioner Sir Christopher Pitchers, presiding, warned Wateridge to expect a custodial sentence for such a "breach of trust". On 21 September Wateridge was sentenced to 2 years imprisonment by the Inferior Number of the Royal Court.

In August 2009, Claude Donnelly, then 69, was sentenced by the Superior Number of Royal Court to a total of 15 years in prison after two trials in May 2009 and June 2009 for offences against young girls between 1968 and 1982. These offences were unconnected to Haut de la Garenne. He was convicted in May 2009 on one count of rape and three counts of indecent assault and in June 2009 on ten counts of indecent assault, four counts of rape and one count of procuring an act of gross indecency. Royal Court Commissioner Sir Christopher Pitchers, presiding, said that the abuse had had a terrible effect on Donnelly's victims, and that the substantial period of imprisonment recommended by the Attorney General was correct.

In November 2010, Morag and Anthony Jordan, a married couple who worked as house parents at Haut de la Garenne during the 1970s, were convicted of eight separate counts relating to physical abuse and subsequently received jail terms of nine and six months. Morag Jordan was acquitted of a further 28 counts and her husband of four.

== Criticisms of the investigation ==
There have been criticisms of the original investigation at Haut de la Garenne, both in Jersey and elsewhere.

The former minister for health and social services Senator Stuart Syvret, said that he had been made aware in early 2007 of abuse at the home and had called for an independent enquiry. Frank Walker, the Chief Minister, accused him of damaging Jersey's reputation by speaking to the media, but stated that he had "every confidence that the criminal investigations and any subsequent prosecutions will be, and will be seen to be, thorough and pursued with the utmost rigour and professionalism" and that "there is no hiding place in Jersey for anyone who abused children or, who in any way may have colluded with that abuse and no stone will be left unturned to bring them to justice."

It was suggested that some finds may actually be props from the TV series Bergerac.

The Attorney General, who has the responsibility for prosecutions, stated that "justice should be done" in spite of delays in the investigation. United Kingdom MP John Hemming said that he thought that there was no doubt that there were efforts to cover up. He and Senator Syvret sought permission to apply for a judicial review of UK Justice Secretary Jack Straw's decision not to intervene over the prosecution of historic child abuse cases. They called for UK government intervention and assurance that cases were heard outside Jersey, on the grounds that Jersey's legal system could not guarantee a fair trial of an inquiry of this scale. At a hearing before the High Court in London in March 2009, the application for judicial review was dismissed.

Criticism intensified after the November 2008 withdrawal by police of claims of evidence with the investigation being described variously as a "shambles". It was suggested that those leading the enquiry had leaped too readily to conclusions. The reliance on indications given by the same sniffer dogs criticised in connection with the disappearance of Madeleine McCann was also questioned.

The Chief Officer of the States of Jersey Police, Graham Power, was suspended in November 2008 pending an inquiry into his handling of the case, in particular into his release of preliminary findings to the press.

Defence advocates for Aubin, Wateridge and Donnelly argued in pre-trial proceedings that inaccurate and sensational publicity surrounding the inquiry would seriously adversely affect the cases against their clients, and that there had been political pressure to bring charges. Royal Court Commissioner Sir Christopher Pitchers (a retired High Court of England and Wales judge appointed to preside over the trials of Wateridge and Donnelly) rejected the defence applications to halt proceedings and permitted the prosecutions to continue, despite what he described as the way in which the senior investigating officer "whipped up a frenzied interest in the inquiry", as he believed that the November 2008 statements by States of Jersey Police that there had been no child murders had done much to mitigate the effects of earlier publicity.

Detective Superintendent Gradwell retired in August 2009 at the end of his contract and returned to the UK. On retiring, he described the investigation prior to the time he took over as a "poorly managed mess" and, in particular, the decision to excavate at Haut de la Garenne as being without justification and as "a complete and total waste of public money, time and effort". In September 2009, Lenny Harper published a point-by-point counterblast to these claims.

== Research into inquiry ==
In 2011, Leah McGrath Goodman, an American journalist, claimed that she was banned from re-entering either the United Kingdom or the Bailiwick of Jersey for a period of two years, whilst in the middle of undertaking research on the abuse allegations. The alleged ban was then reportedly reduced subsequently to one year, after the intervention of John Hemming, a Member of the Westminster Parliament in the United Kingdom, and others. In September 2012, Trevor Pitman, one of the Deputies for the Parish of Saint Helier, started a campaign and a petition-drive to lift her ban from the UK and Jersey, so that she could be granted a new visa and work permit and finish her investigative work. The ban was lifted in 2013, and Goodman was issued a visa.

== New inquiry, 2013 ==
A new major inquiry headed by Sally Bradley QC, a Deputy Judge of the High Court of England and Wales, was announced in July 2013. The start of the inquiry was delayed when Sally Bradley became ill soon after her appointment and she was replaced by Frances Oldham QC. The inquiry presented its report in July 2017.

== See also ==
- Jimmy Savile sexual abuse scandal
- Child sexual abuse
- Institutional abuse
- Sexual abuse
