= Vingtaine de l'Église =

Vingtaine in Saint Martin, Jersey

Vingtaine de l'Église is one of the five vingtaines of St Martin in the Channel Island of Jersey.

== The Village ==
The vingtaine is one of the most populous of St Martin as it includes St Martin's Village, containing the Parish Church of St Martin, St Martin's Tearoom, St Martin's Primary School and the village shop. The current Rector of the Parish is Ms G Baudains.

== Vingtenier ==
The Vingtenier de l'Eglise is currently Mr S Falle, as enrolled through the Honorary Police of St Martin. The Connétable of St Martin is Ms K Shenton Stone, as elected unopposed in the 2018 Jersey General Election.

== See also ==
- Vingtaine de Faldouet
- Vingtaine du Fief de la Reine
- Vingtaine de Rozel
- Vingtaine de la Queruee.
