= Vingtaine du Fief de la Reine =

Vingtaine in Saint Martin, Jersey

Vingtaine du Fief de la Reine is one of the five vingtaines of St Martin in the Channel Island of Jersey. The Vingtenier du Fief de la Reine is currently Mr D West as enrolled through the Honorary Police of St Martin. The Connétable of St Martin is Ms K Shenton Stone, as elected unopposed in the 2018 Jersey General Election. In Jerriais, the vingtaine is known as La Vîngtaine du Fief du Rouai.

See also Vingtaine de Faldouet; Vingtaine de la Queruee; Vingtaine de Rozel and Vingtaine de l'Eglise.
