= Trinity, Jersey =

Parish in eastern Jersey

Coordinates: 49.233°N 2.092°W

Trinity La Trinité (French) La Trinneté (Norman)
- Jersey parish
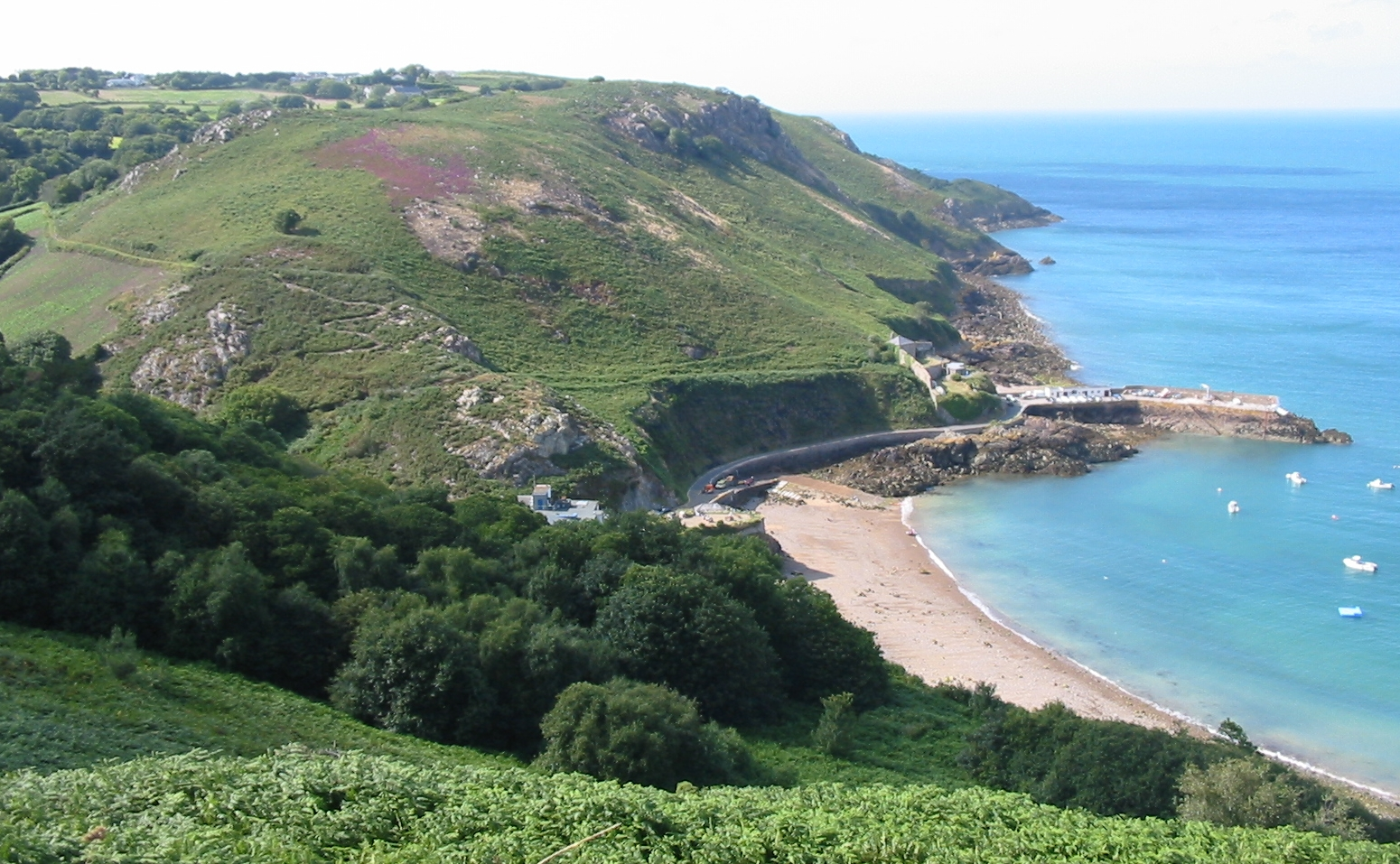
- Bouley Bay is a small harbour in Trinity.

- Flag Coat of arms

- Location of Trinity in Jersey
- Crown Dependency: Jersey, Channel Islands

Government
  - Connétable: Philip Le Sueur

Area
  - Total: 12.3 km^{2} (4.7 sq mi)
  - Rank: Ranked 3rd
- Elevation: 124 m (407 ft)

Population (2011)
  - Total: 3,156
  - Density: 257/km^{2} (665/sq mi)
- Time zone: GMT
  - Summer (DST): UTC+01
- Postcode district: JE3
- Postcode sector: 5
- Website: www.parish.gov.je/trinity/

Trinity (French: La Trinité, Jèrriais: La Trinneté) is one of the twelve parishes of Jersey in the Channel Islands. It is 5.8 kilometres (3.6 mi) north of St Helier. (Note: Measured from the Parish Hall to the Royal Square) It has a population of 3,156. The parish covers 6,975 vergées (12.3 km^{2} [4.7 sq mi]). Les Platons in the north of the parish is the highest point in Jersey. The parish borders St John, St Helier, St Saviour and St Martin.

Trinity is an agricultural, rural parish, with only 16% of the parish being built up, and 61% dedicated to cultivation. The population is generally spread out across the whole parish, with a loosely defined village towards the north of the parish. The parish's main bay is Bouley Bay, a short distance from the village. A section of Rozel Bay is also shared with neighbouring St Martin. It is home to the States Farm, Jersey Zoo, the Royal Jersey Agricultural and Horticultural Society Showground, and the Pallot Heritage Steam Museum.

The parish church is dedicated to the Holy Trinity, the only island parish church not dedicated to a saint. The coat of arms of the Parish of Trinity shows the Shield of the Trinity diagram.

== History ==
The Jersey parish system has been in place for centuries. By Norman times, the parish boundaries were firmly fixed and remain largely unchanged since. In 1180 Jersey was divided by the Normans into three ministeria for administrative purposes. Trinity was part of de Groceio. De Groceio likely refers to the Jersey family name, de Gruchy.

The Parish church, with its distinctive white pyramidal spire, is a notable landmark.

The Le Vesconte memorial (erected 1910) takes the form of an obelisk at a crossroads commemorating Philippe Le Vesconte (21 December 1837 – 21 August 1909) who was 10 times elected connétable between 1868–1877 and 1890–1909.

In 2007, parishioner Meriel Edwards donated a field next to the Trinity Arms pub to the parish which permitted the development of the 39-home first-time buyers development, as well as new footpaths around the village centre.

== Governance ==
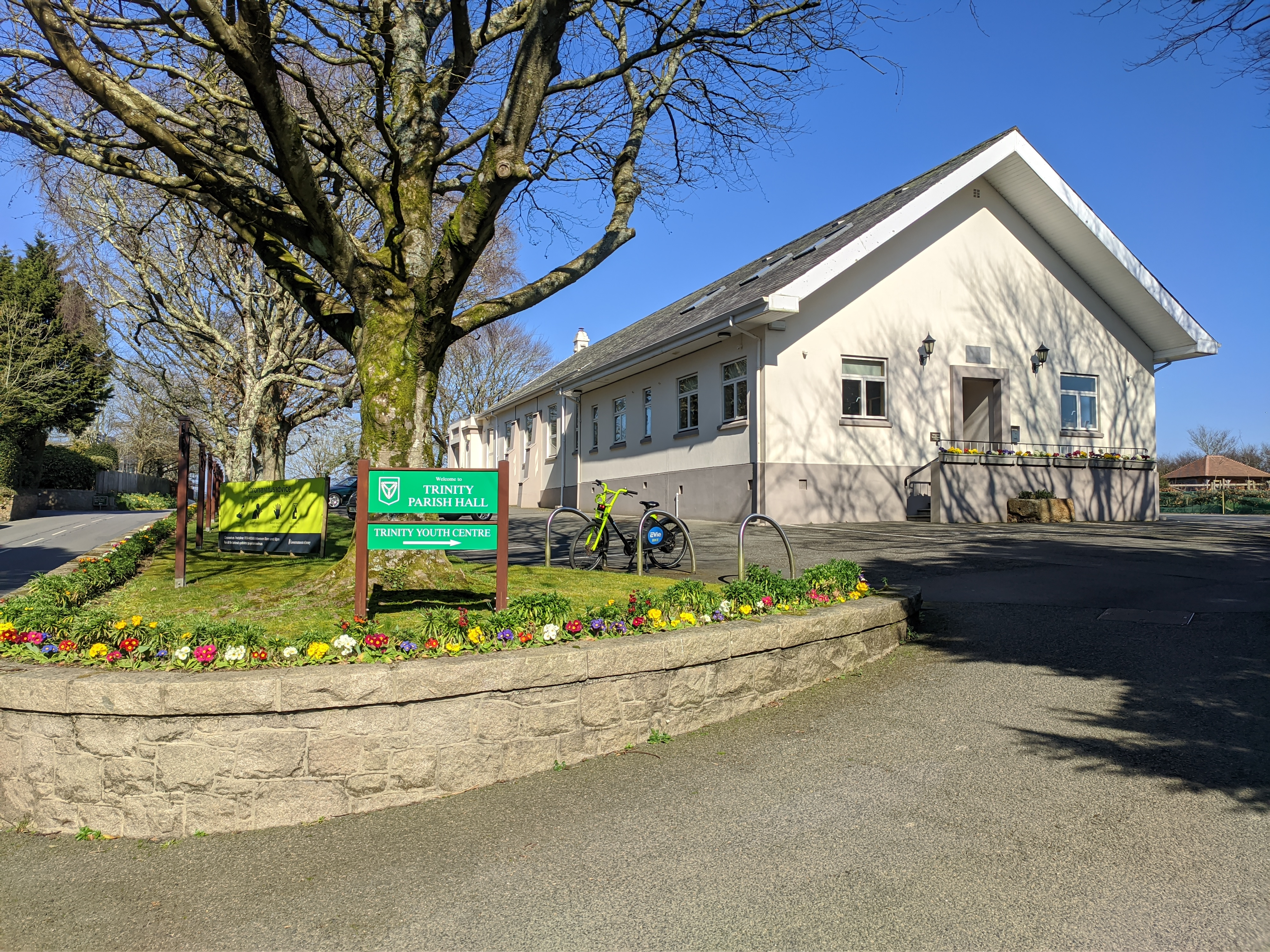
Trinity Parish Hall

The parish is a first-level administrative division of the Bailiwick of Jersey, a British Crown dependency. The highest official in the parish is the Connétable of Trinity. The incumbent office holder is Philip Le Sueur, who has held the office since 2014. The parish administration is headquartered at the Parish Hall next to the parish church.

At present, the parish forms one electoral district for States Assembly elections and elects one Deputy, as well as eight Senators in an islandwide constituency. The current Deputy for Trinity is Hugh Raymond. Under the proposed electoral reform, it will form part of the Central electoral district consisting of St. John, St. Lawrence and Trinity, which will collectively elect four representatives alongside the parishes' Connétables.

Trinity is divided into the following vingtaines:

- La Vingtaine de la Ville-à-l'Évêque
- La Vingtaine de Rozel
- La Vingtaine du Rondin
- La Vingtaine des Augrès
- La Vingtaine de la Croiserie

== Geography ==
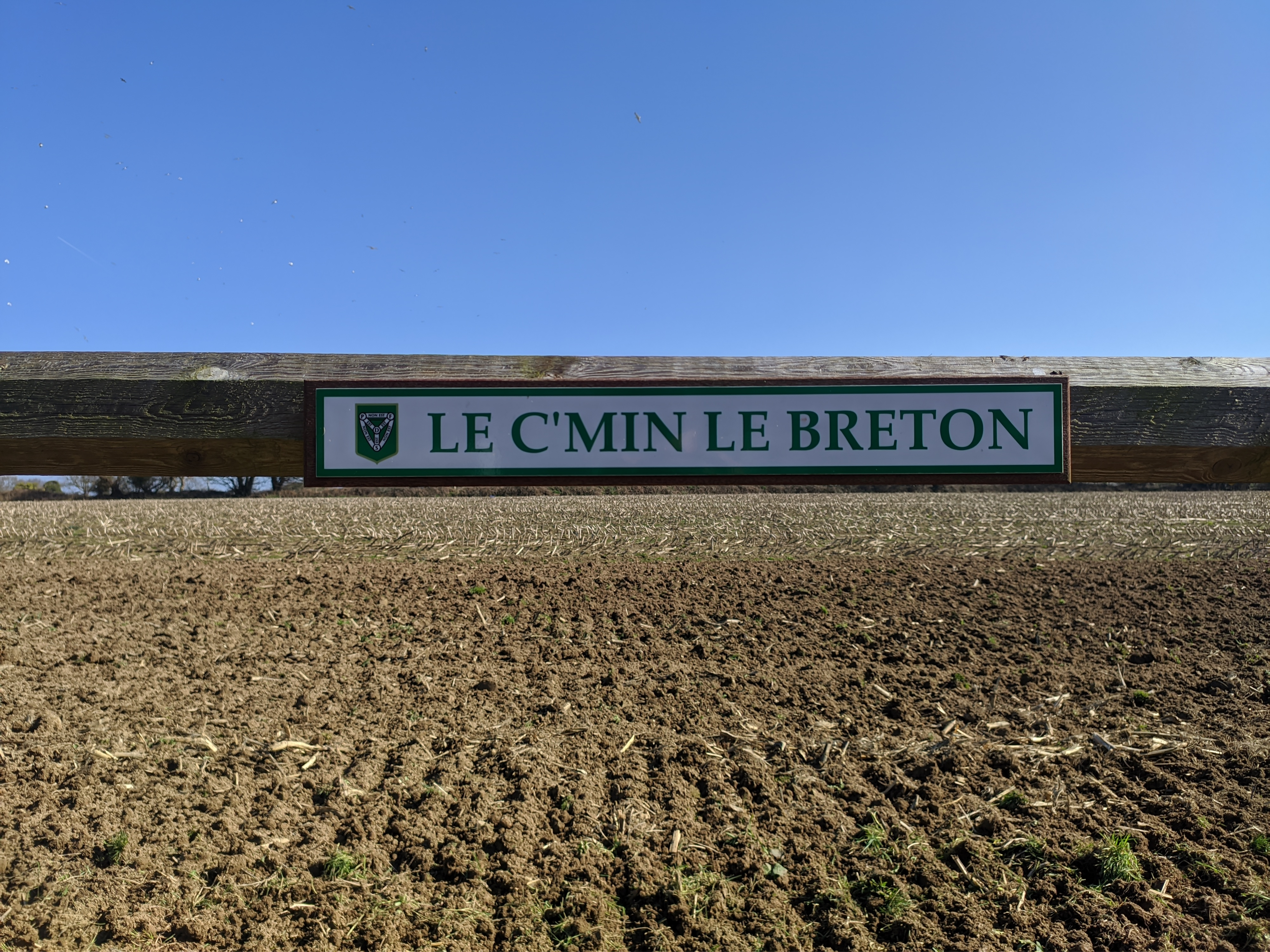
Trinity road name signs are white with green text. This sign is in Jèrriais, Jersey's traditional language.

Trinity is in the north of the island. It borders St John, St Helier, St Saviour and St Martin. It has two main bays, Bouley Bay and Rozel (on the border with St Martin). It has the highest point of the Grands Vaux valley, which terminates at its parish church. The highest point of the island, Les Platons, is located in the north of Trinity.

=== Bouley Bay ===
Bouley Bay (French: Baie de Boulay) is a bay located on the north coast in the centre of the parish. In the Extente of 1274, the bay was recorded as Portus de Boley (Bouley Harbour). It has some of the deepest waters off the island's coast. In the 19th century it was considered for developing the main harbour for the island, but it was probably ruled out as impracticable because of the steep hills surrounding the bay. The steep and winding hill plays host annually to the Bouley Bay Hill Climb.

=== Settlements ===
Trinity Village is the main settlement in the parish. Victoria Village is located on the border with Trinity.

Trinity Village is a relatively small and loosely defined village of homes spreading out from the parish church along the parish's main roads in a form of ribbon development. The A8 and B31 main roads run through the village. Recent development has centralised the village around the church. The village has a small, independent store, as well as a pub and youth centre.

As a parish, Trinity has historically been resistant to speed limits and traffic calming schemes. For example, the parish has declined to introduce the green lane scheme with 15-mile-per-hour limits and priority to pedestrians and cyclists on its by-roads. The village had no specific lower speed limit until 2013, but now some parts of village have a 30 mph speed limit. The northern area of the village still has a 40 mph speed limit. There is no traffic calming or pedestrian crossings in the village.

== Demography ==
Historical population
Year	Pop.	±%
1991	2,640	—
1996	2,639	−0.0%
2001	2,718	+3.0%
2011	3,156	+16.1%

== Culture ==
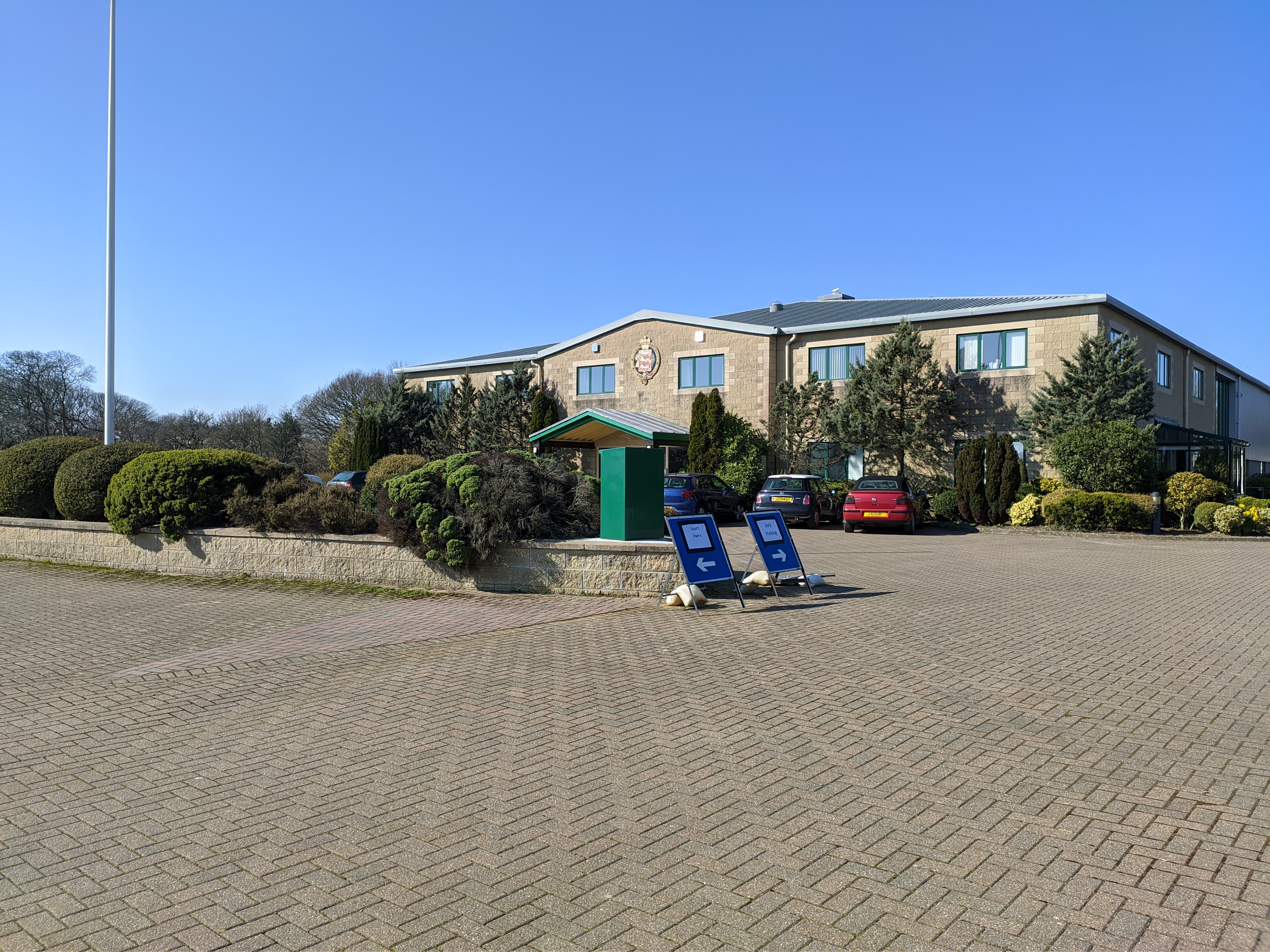
The Royal Jersey showground hosts a number of events, including the Art Eisteddfod and the annual Weekender music festival.

In folklore, the area of Bouley has been reputed to be haunted by the Tchian d'Bouôlé (Black Dog of Bouley), a phantom dog whose appearance presages storms. The story is believed to have been encouraged by smugglers who wanted to discourage nocturnal movements by people who might witness the movement of contraband at the harbour in Bouley.

The Royal Jersey Showground has been host to the largest music festival in the Channel Islands each year since 2004—the Weekender Festival, and previously Jersey Live.

== Twin towns ==
Trinity is twinned with:

- (France) Agon-Coutainville, Normandy

== Landmarks ==
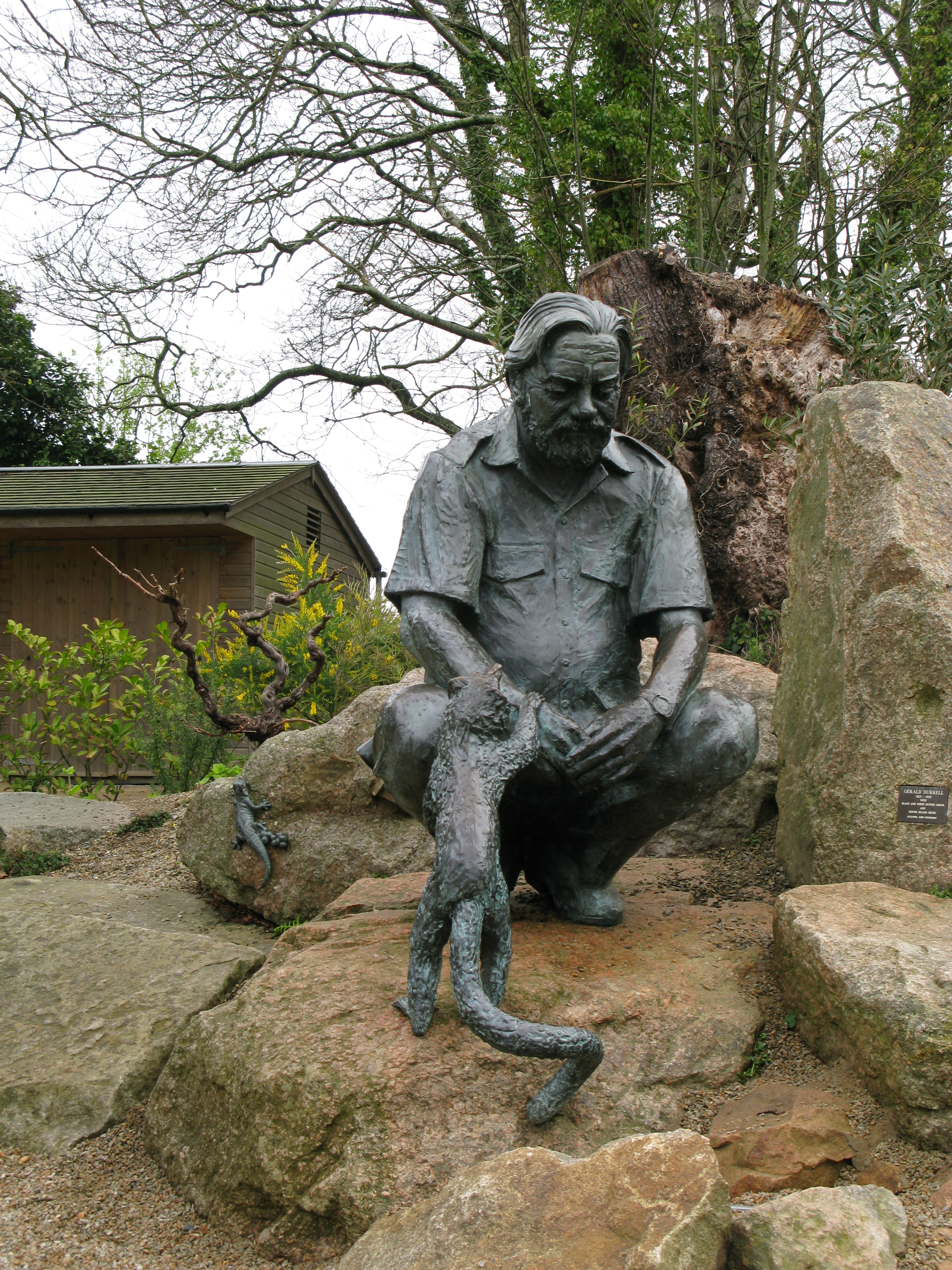
Jersey Zoo is the most popular tourist attraction in Trinity and possibly in the whole of Jersey.

Jersey Zoo (formerly Durrell Wildlife Park) is located at Les Augrès Manor in Trinity. It was established in 1959 by naturalist and writer Gerald Durrell. It has approximately 169,000 visitors per year.

Trinity Manor is the home of the Seigneur of Trinity. Athelstan Riley purchased Trinity Manor in 1909. Finding the manor house in a ruined condition, he undertook an elaborate restoration (or "imaginative reconstruction", which has been criticised as turning the building into a French style château). The reconstruction was carried out 1910–1913 by C. Messervy to designs by Sir Reginald Blomfield. One of the surviving feudal duties of the holder of this fief is to present the Monarch with a pair of mallards when they visit the Island. The current holder of the title is Pamela Bell, as Dame of Trinity.

== Notable people ==
Gerald Durrell, a British naturalist, writer and conservationist, opened Jersey Zoo, a wildlife conservation park, and founded the Durrell Wildlife Conservation Trust in the parish in 1959. His ashes are buried in the grounds of the park.

Among prominent natives of the parish (les Trinnetais) is Sir Arthur de la Mare (1914–1994), a retired ambassador and diplomat in Japan, Thailand and Singapore, who wrote Jèrriais literature in the Trinity dialect.

Alan Whicker lived here from the 1960s until his death in 2013.

== Gallery ==
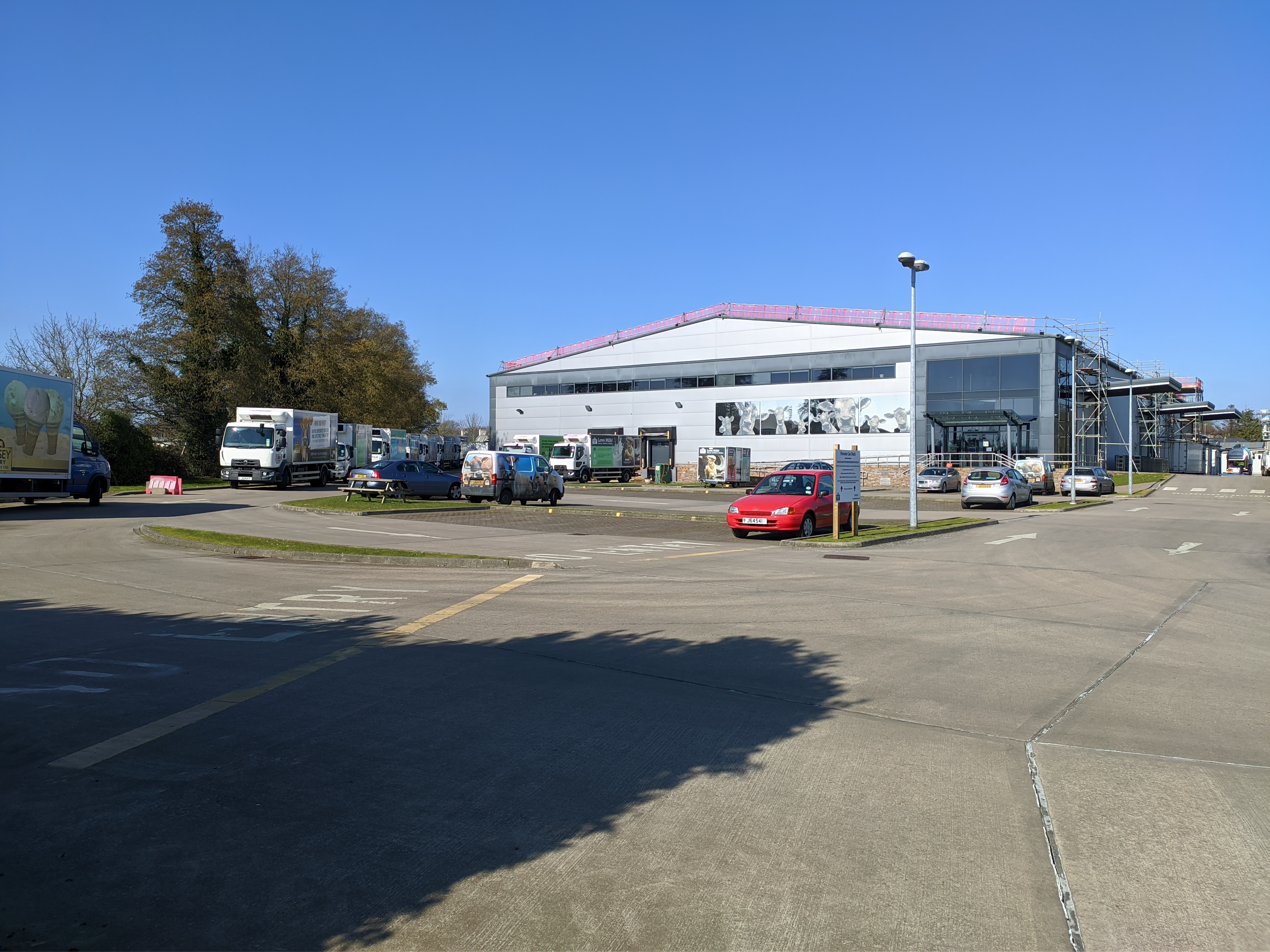
The headquarters of Jersey Dairy, which supplies milk across the island and abroad, is located in the parish.

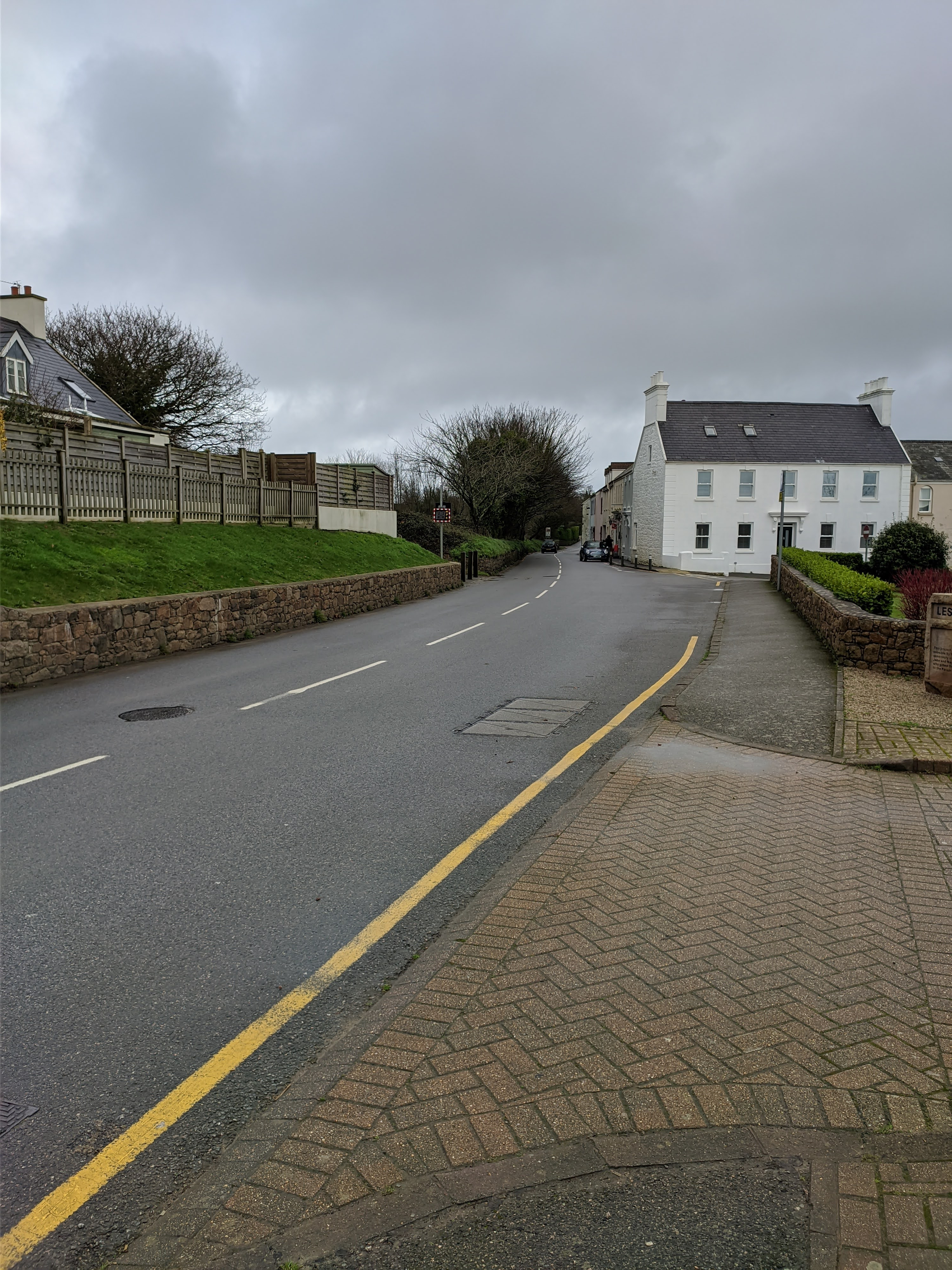
The main road through the village

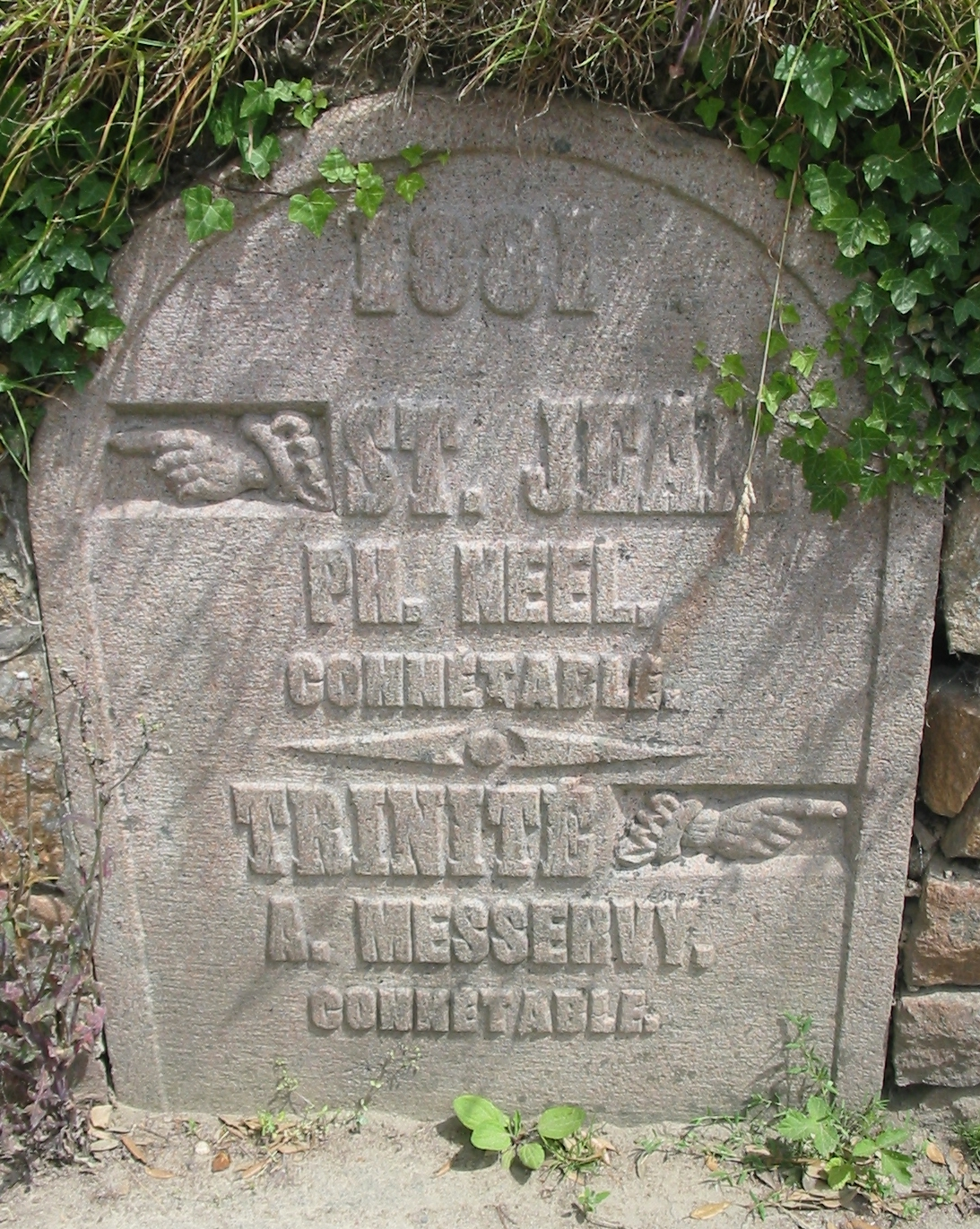
Boundary stone on the border of Trinity and Saint John, dated 1881

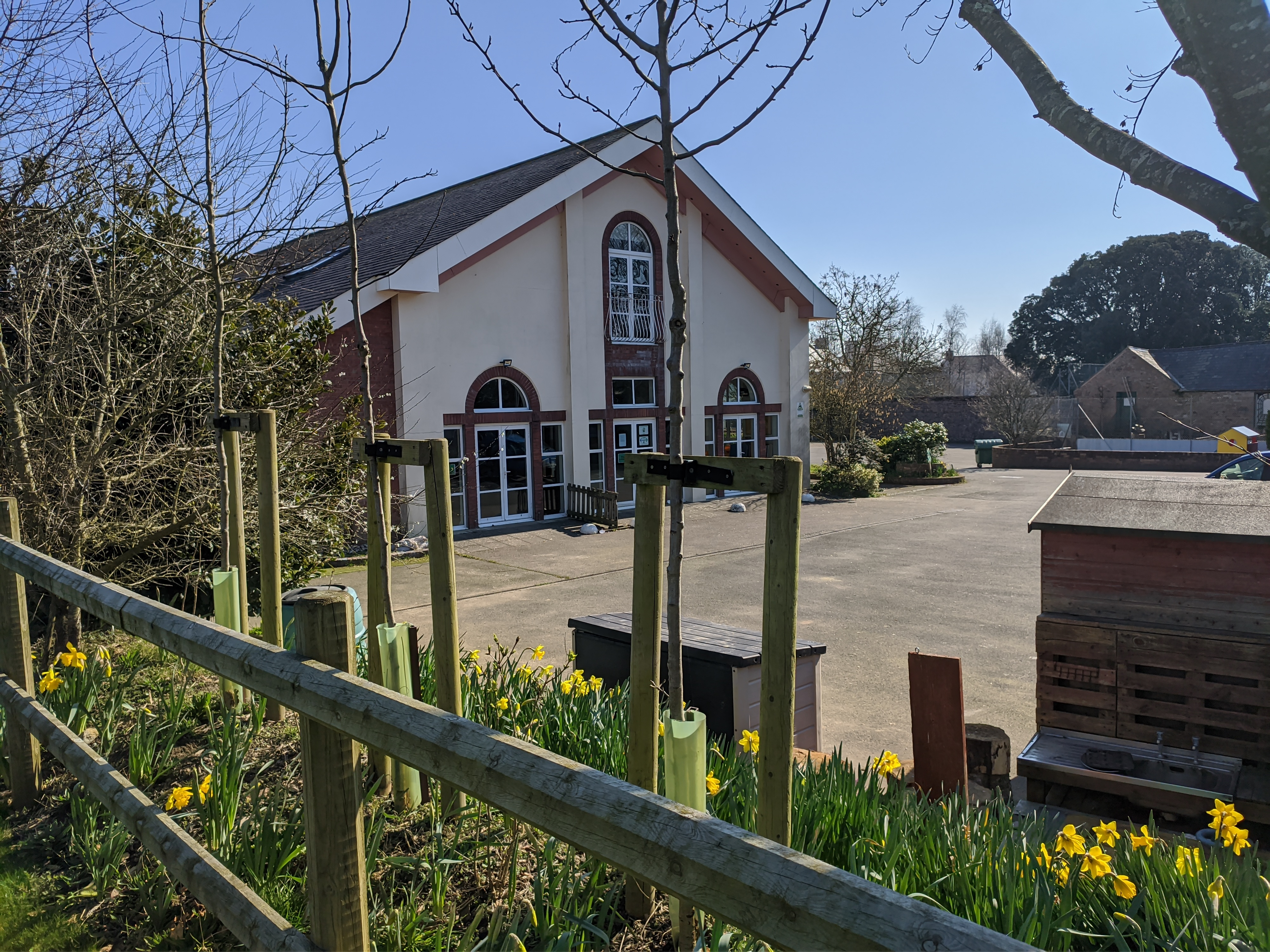
The Youth Centre, which hosts the Trinity Scouts troop
