= Leah McGrath Goodman =

Henry Marton Stanely

- Born: Boston, Massachusetts, U.S.
- Education: St. Bonaventure University ('98)
- Occupations: Journalist, author
- Website: leahmcgrathgoodman.com

Leah McGrath Goodman is an American author and freelance journalist who has worked in New York City and London. She began her career as a special writer and editor for The Wall Street Journal, Dow Jones Newswires, and Barron's, and was recruited from university by the Dow Jones Newspaper Fund. She has contributed to publications and agencies such as Fortune, The Financial Times, The Wall Street Journal, Condé Nast Portfolio, the Associated Press, Forbes and The Guardian.

In 2010, McGrath Goodman was the recipient of a Scripps Howard Foundation fellowship in environmental journalism and a visiting professorship at the University of Colorado at Boulder. Her first book The Asylum: The Renegades Who Hijacked the World's Oil Market, about the global oil trading market, was published in 2011. In 2014, a Newsweek cover story where she allegedly uncovered the identity of bitcoin's inventor attracted widespread controversy. In 2016, McGrath Goodman placed as a finalist for the National Magazine Award for her coverage of America's widening wealth gap as part of a package of stories for Newsweek. In 2017, a second Newsweek cover story she wrote about the 9-11 attacks leading Ground Zero to become a deadly cancer cluster was also nominated for a National Magazine Award.

== Early life and education ==
McGrath Goodman was born in Boston, Massachusetts; her parents were an English teacher and an artist. She graduated from St. Bonaventure University in 1998 with bachelor's degrees in journalism and political science. In 2025, she received a Master's in Corruption Analysis and Governance with first-class honors from the Centre for the Study of Corruption at the University of Sussex in Brighton, UK.

== Career ==
=== Jersey child abuse investigation ===
In 2012, UK politician John Hemming tabled an early day motion regarding the withdrawal of McGrath Goodman's UK visa, because she had been prevented from entering the UK after declaring her intentions to investigate allegations of a cover-up regarding the Jersey child abuse investigation, despite having a clean immigration and travel record. In interviews with the BBC, The Guardian and other media outlets, McGrath Goodman stated that she was confused as to why she was not allowed entry into the UK and was therefore unable to catch a connecting flight into Jersey, a popular holiday destination and a British Crown dependency. UK Border Force stated that the reason she was denied entry was they were not satisfied she was genuinely seeking entry as a visitor for the limited period she claimed and she had attempted to mislead the Border Force officer about her travel plans and the reason she required entry to the UK. In 2013, the ban was lifted and a new visa granted after a campaign by British politicians and journalists. A major new inquiry into the abuse scandal led by a senior UK judge was also announced. In 2017, the inquiry concluded hundreds of children were abused on the island for decades. In an interview with Vice, McGrath Goodman said she would continue to research and complete her book on what happened to the children of Jersey, stating, "I've never seen grown men in law enforcement and high-level government positions literally fear for themselves, their lives, and their families while trying to do their jobs and protect innocent people...Something is definitely wrong when investigating child abuse means being bullied, threatened, and smeared. As someone who cares about the island and cares about these people and these issues, I don't know if I can watch something like that and just not do anything as a journalist."

=== 2014 bitcoin cover story ===
In a March 2014 Newsweek magazine cover story, McGrath Goodman published what she asserted to be the identity and location of Satoshi Nakamoto, the inventor of bitcoin. The article has generated controversy for its methodology and conclusions. Writing in Forbes magazine, Andy Greenberg stated that "Criticism of Newsweek’s article, which describes a silent standoff" as reporter Leah McGrath Goodman stood at the end of Nakamoto's driveway and interviewed him in the presence of police, focused in particular on Goodman's decision to name Nakamoto's family members who agreed to be interviewed, and Newsweek magazine's decision to publish a picture of his house. At the same time, Kashmir Hill, also from Forbes, defended the story, stating, "It's a journalist's job to invade privacy, and to report things that people often don't want reported, to tell stories people don't want told. The Bitcoin story is too big and too important not to be fully investigated." Goodman wrote that when she asked Nakamoto about bitcoin during a brief in-person interview, Nakamoto appeared to confirm his identity as the bitcoin founder by stating: "I am no longer involved in that and I cannot discuss it. It's been turned over to other people. They are in charge of it now. I no longer have any connection." (This quote was later confirmed by deputies at the Los Angeles County Sheriff's Department who were present at the time.) Several hours later, Nakamoto's P2P Foundation account posted a message stating he was not the person in Newsweek's article. Wired 's Robert McMillan, however, reported that Nakamoto's account had been hacked.

== Books ==
- The Asylum: The Renegades Who Hijacked the World's Oil Market. William Morrow and Company. 2011. ISBN 0-061-76627-5.
- Arianna Huffington (Biography) . Weidenfeld & Nicolson. 2021.ISBN 978-1474610711.
