= Channel Islands cuisine =

Culinary traditions of the Channel Islands

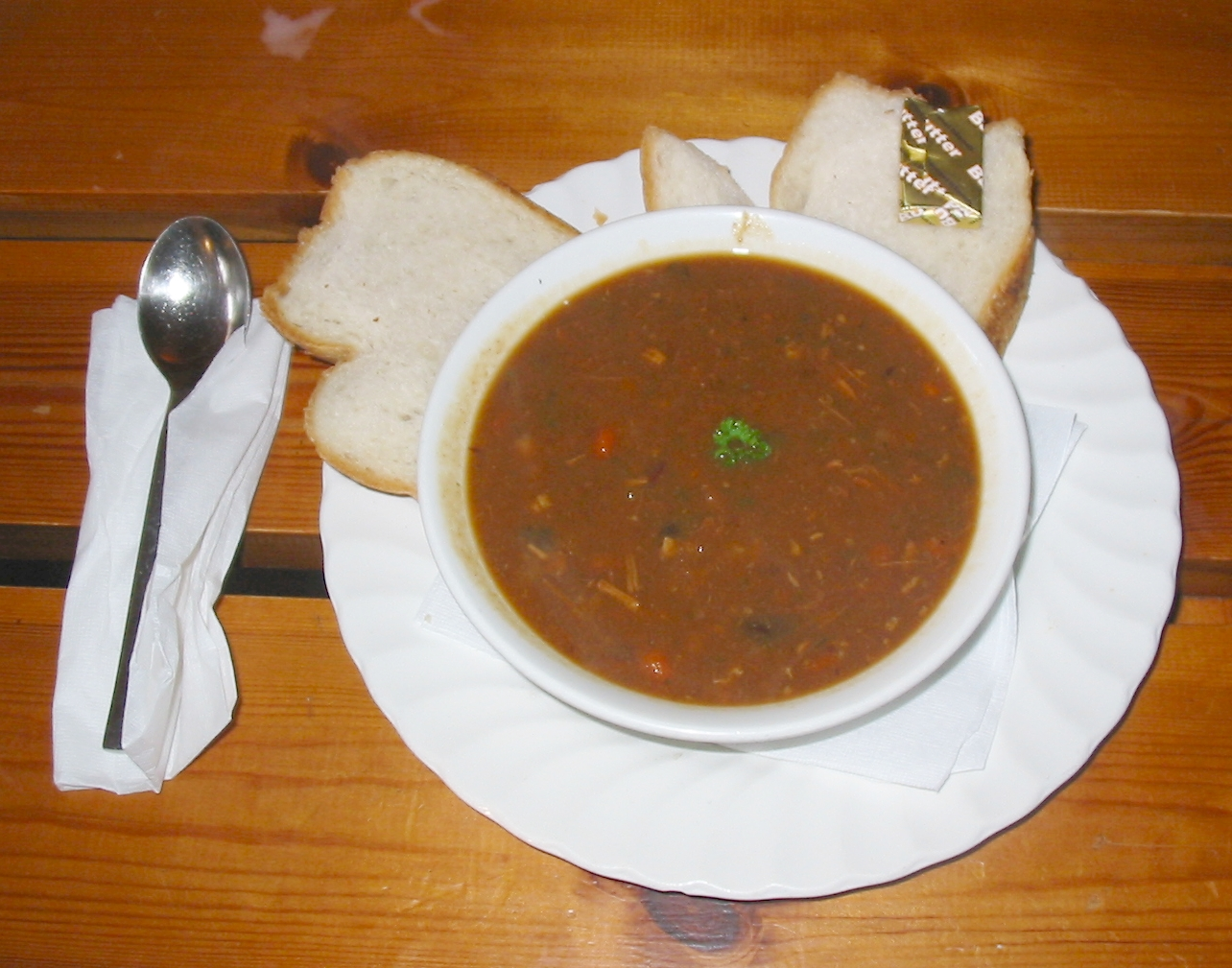
Des pais au fou – Jersey bean crock, accompanied by slices of cabbage loaf

Channel Islands cuisine is the cooking styles, traditions and recipes of the Crown dependencies of the Channel Islands, namely the Bailiwicks of Guernsey and of Jersey.

Among the islands' specialities are locally-caught seafood, rich Channel Island milk, Guernsey Bean Jar, and Jersey cabbage loaf.

== Shared ==
Locally-caught seafood has traditionally been important to the cuisines of both Guernsey and Jersey: mussels (called moules locally), scallops, oysters, lobster and crabs — especially spider crabs which are considered a particular delicacy. Ormers are conserved and fishing is restricted; they were made into Ormer casserole. A speciality is conger eel soup.

Channel Island milk, being very rich with a higher fat and protein content than milk from Holstein Friesian cattle, cream and butter have played a large part in the islands' cooking.

The "gastronomic hotspot" islands of Guernsey, Jersey, and Sark have 16 restaurants listed in The Good Food Guide. Jersey's Bohemia restaurant has a Michelin star and five AA Rosettes.

== Guernsey ==
Dishes traditional in Guernsey cuisine are the Guernsey gâche, a rich fruit bread, gâche mêlaïe, a dense apple cake, and Guernsey bean jar, a type of cassoulet of pork and beans.

== Jersey ==
Bean crock (les pais au fou) can best be described as a sort of Norman cassoulet. It is a slow-cooked pork and bean stew, most authentically containing a pig's trotter, water and onions.

Cabbage loaf is the traditional Jersey bread baked between two cabbage leaves, while Jersey wonders are a kind of doughnut, not filled with jam.

Jersey Royal potatoes are the local variety of new potato, and the island is famous for its early crop of small, potatoes from the south-facing côtils (steeply-sloping fields).
