= Culture of Jersey =

The culture of Jersey is the culture of the Bailiwick of Jersey. Jersey has a mixed Franco-British culture; however, modern Jersey culture is dominated by British cultural influences and has also been influenced by immigrant communities such as the Bretons and the Portuguese (mainly from Madeira).

Jersey's culture is strongly influenced by its distinct political culture, such as having its own currency and postal service, and its important industries such as agriculture and finance.

== Languages ==
Jersey is predominantly English-speaking, with English forming the main cultural and official language of Jersey people and government. However, French remains a co-official language due to its use as the language of civil affairs in the island. Due to immigration, many islanders' first language is now Portuguese.

Jèrriais, the island's Norman language, is spoken by a minority of the population, although it was the majority language in the 19th century. Among those who still speak the language one can identify the parish of origin of a speaker by differences in phonology and lexis. There has recently been a push, especially from the Government of Jersey, to keep Jèrriais as a living language. This includes Jèrriais lessons at all Government primary schools.

Most common place names in Jersey are in Jèrriais (such as La Ville-ès-Renauds), though some have been gallicised (e.g., Les Quennevais) and most pronunciations have been anglicised. The notable exception is all the parishes, which are usually in English (though French and Jèrriais forms exist). Road names are in French or Jèrriais, except in the town area and some other new developments around the island.

== Literature ==
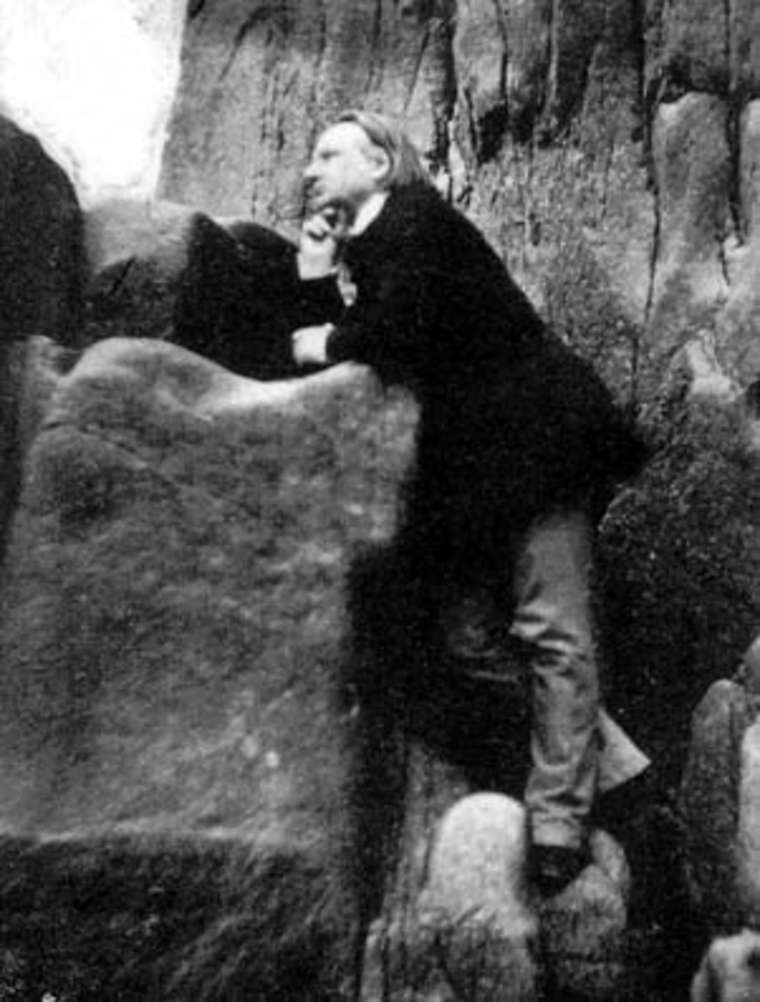
Victor Hugo in exile on Jersey, 1850s

Literature in Jersey may be divided into:

- Literature in Jèrriais,
- Francophone literature, and
- Jersey literature in English.

The literary tradition in Jersey is traced back to Wace, the 12th-century Jersey-born poet.

William Prynne wrote poetry while imprisoned in Jersey, but little indigenous literature survives from before the 18th century.

Printing only arrived in Jersey in the 1780s, but the island supported a multitude of regular publications in French (and Jèrriais) and English throughout the 19th century, in which poetry, most usually topical and satirical, flourished.

The first printed Jèrriais appears in the first newspapers at the end of the 18th century. The earliest identified dated example of printed poetry in Jèrriais is a fragment by Matchi L'Gé (Matthew Le Geyt, 1777–1849), dated 1795. The first printed anthology of Jèrriais poetry, Rimes Jersiaises, was published in 1865.

Influential writers include 'Laelius' (Sir Robert Pipon Marett 1820–1884, Bailiff of Jersey 1880–1884), 'A.A.L.G.' (Augustus Aspley Le Gros 1840–1877), and 'St.-Luorenchais' (Philippe Langlois 1817–1884).

Philippe Le Sueur Mourant (1848–1918) wrote under several pseudonyms. His greatest success was the character Bram Bilo, but he later developed the Pain family, newly moved to Saint Helier, who commented on its Anglicized society and fashionable entertainments.

'Elie' (Edwin J. Luce 1881–1918) was editor of the French-language newspaper La Nouvelle Chronique de Jersey and a poet who wrote topical poems for the newspaper. He died in the influenza pandemic of 1918. His brother, Philip W. Luce (1882–1966), also a journalist and poet, emigrated to Canada, but sent occasional writings back to Jersey.

'Caouain' (George W. de Carteret 1869–1940) maintained a weekly newspaper column purporting to be the work of an owl (cahouain) reporting on the latest election news and local gossip.

During the Occupation, the German censors allowed little original writing to be published. However, many older pieces of literature were republished in the newspapers as an act of cultural self-assertion and morale-boosting.

Edward Le Brocq (1877–1964) revived the weekly column in 1946 with a letter from Ph'lip et Merrienne, supposedly a traditional old couple who would comment on the latest news or recall times past. The column continued until the author's death in 1964.

The most influential writer of Jèrriais in the 20th century was a U.S. citizen, George Francis Le Feuvre (1891–1984), whose pen-name was 'George d'la Forge'. He emigrated to North America after the First World War but for almost forty years maintained a flow of articles in Jèrriais back to Jersey for publication in newspapers.

Frank Le Maistre (1910–2002), compiler of the Jèrriais–French dictionary, maintained a literary output starting in the 1930s with newspaper articles under the pseudonym Marie la Pie, poems, magazine articles, and research into toponymy and etymology. He himself considered his masterpiece to be his translation of the Rubaiyat of Omar Khayyam into Jèrriais that he made during the German Occupation (1940–1945).

The French writer Victor Hugo lived in exile in Jersey from 1852 to 1855.

Elinor Glyn and John Lemprière were Jersey-born writers. Frederick Tennyson, Jack Higgins, and Gerald Durrell are among writers who have made Jersey their home.

== Art ==
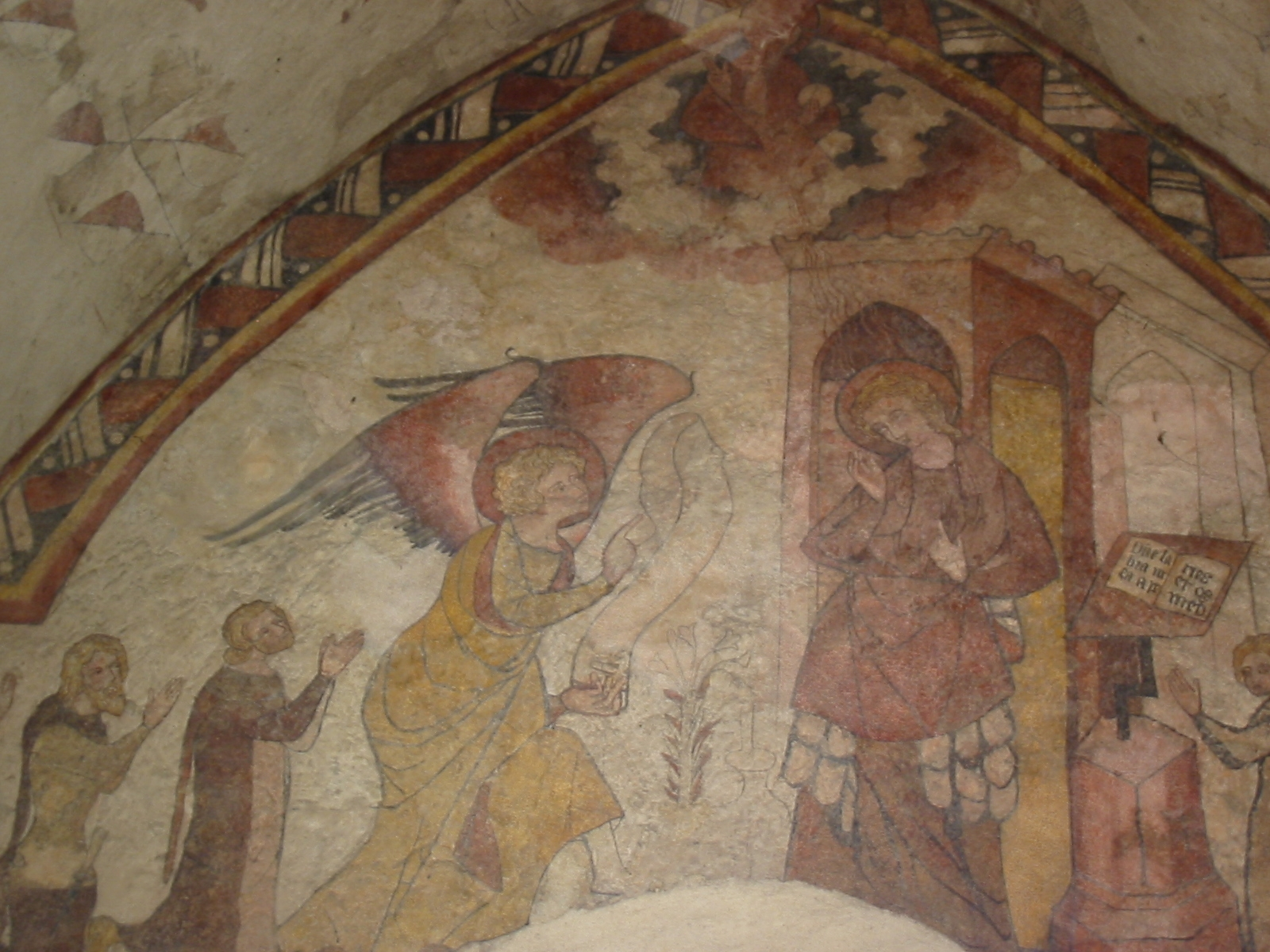
Annunciation in the Fisherman's Chapel (la Chapelle ès Pêcheurs)

Some Neolithic carvings are the earliest works of artistic character to be found in Jersey. Only fragmentary wall-paintings remain from the rich mediaeval artistic heritage, after the wholesale iconoclasm of the Calvinist reformation of the 16th century - the most notable of these are the wall-paintings of the Fisherman's Chapel (la Chapelle ès Pêcheurs) in St. Brelade.

The 1751 statue of George II by John Cheere in the Royal Square was Jersey's first public sculpture since the Reformation. Subsequent works of public art to be seen include:

- Westaway monument (1875, Pierre-Alfred Robinet)
- Don monument (1885, Pierre-Alfred Robinet)
- Queen Victoria statue (1890, Georges Wallet)
- George V statue (1939, William Reid Dick)
- Liberation sculpture (1995, Philip Jackson)
- La Vaque dé Jèrri (2001, John McKenna)
- Jersey Girl (2010, Rowan Gillespie)

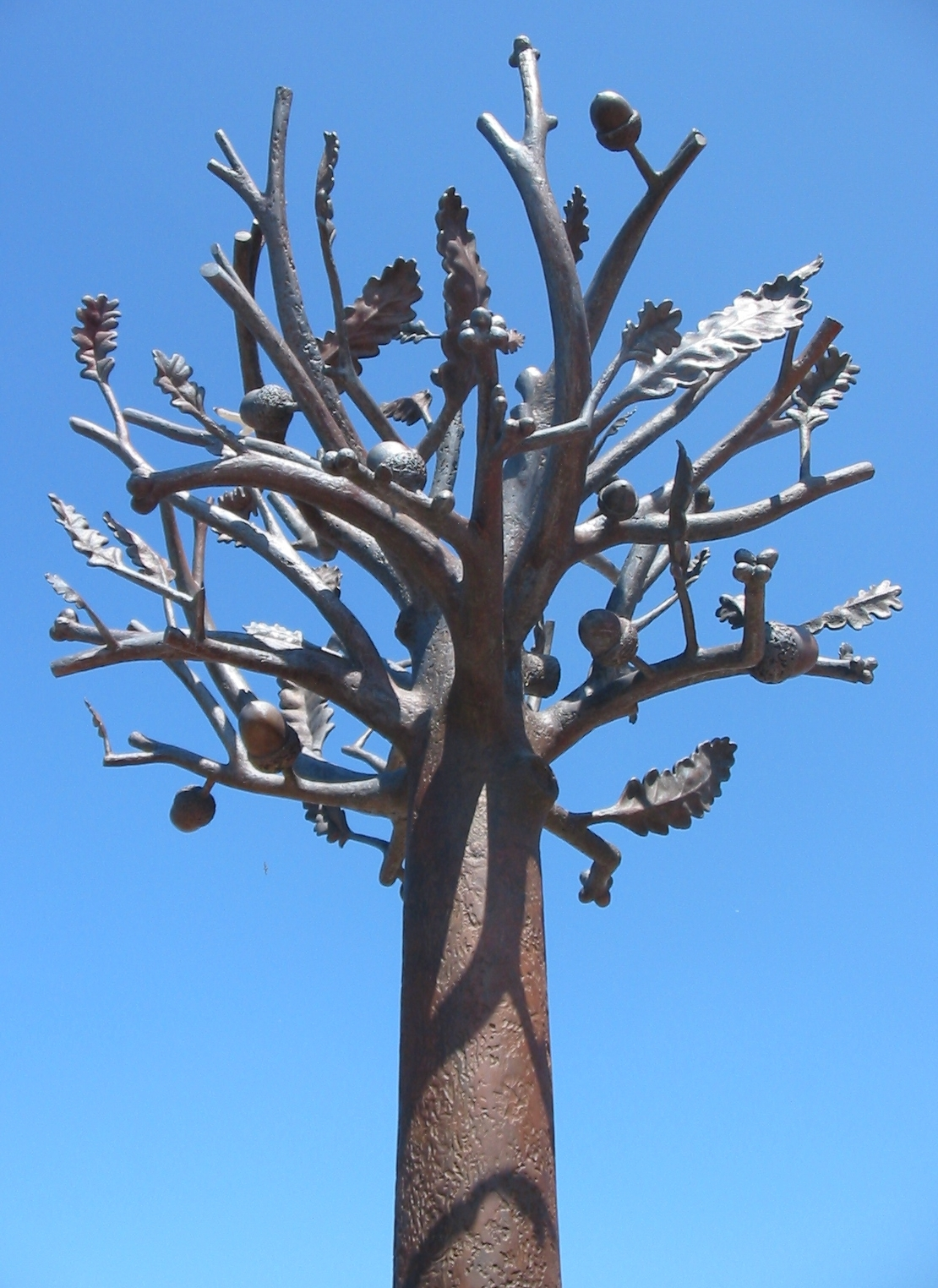
The Freedom Tree sculpture in St. Helier marking the 60th anniversary of the Liberation of Jersey was unveiled 9 May 2005 by Queen Elizabeth II

John Singleton Copley's painting of the Battle of Jersey (6 January 1781), The Death of Major Pierson, became a national icon. The States of Jersey failed in an attempt to purchase it (it is now in the Tate Britain), but the image is reproduced on the reverse of a Jersey £10 note.

John Le Capelain (1812–1848) was born and lived all his life in St. Helier, setting up his studio in the attic of his parents' house in Hill Street. He is best known for his watercolours, although he had earlier followed his father in lithography but abandoned it after 1843. He travelled widely, taking advantage of St. Helier's excellent maritime links, and went sketching in France, England and Scotland. He was commissioned to produce a series of watercolours which were presented to Queen Victoria by the States of Jersey to commemorate her visit of 1846. The series was subsequently lithographed and published in book form. The Queen commissioned Le Capelain to produce a series of watercolour views of the Isle of Wight and it was while working on this commission that Le Capelain contracted tuberculosis and died, barely a week after his 36th birthday. A collection of his works, presented by public subscription in his memory, is displayed in the Parish Hall of St. Helier.

Among artists attracted to Jersey in the 19th century was Sarah Louisa Kilpack (1839–1909), an English artist noted for seascapes and coastal scenes, often stormy, produced for exhibition in London.

John Everett Millais, a Jèrriais speaker from a Jersey family, was born in England, but is considered a Jersey artist.

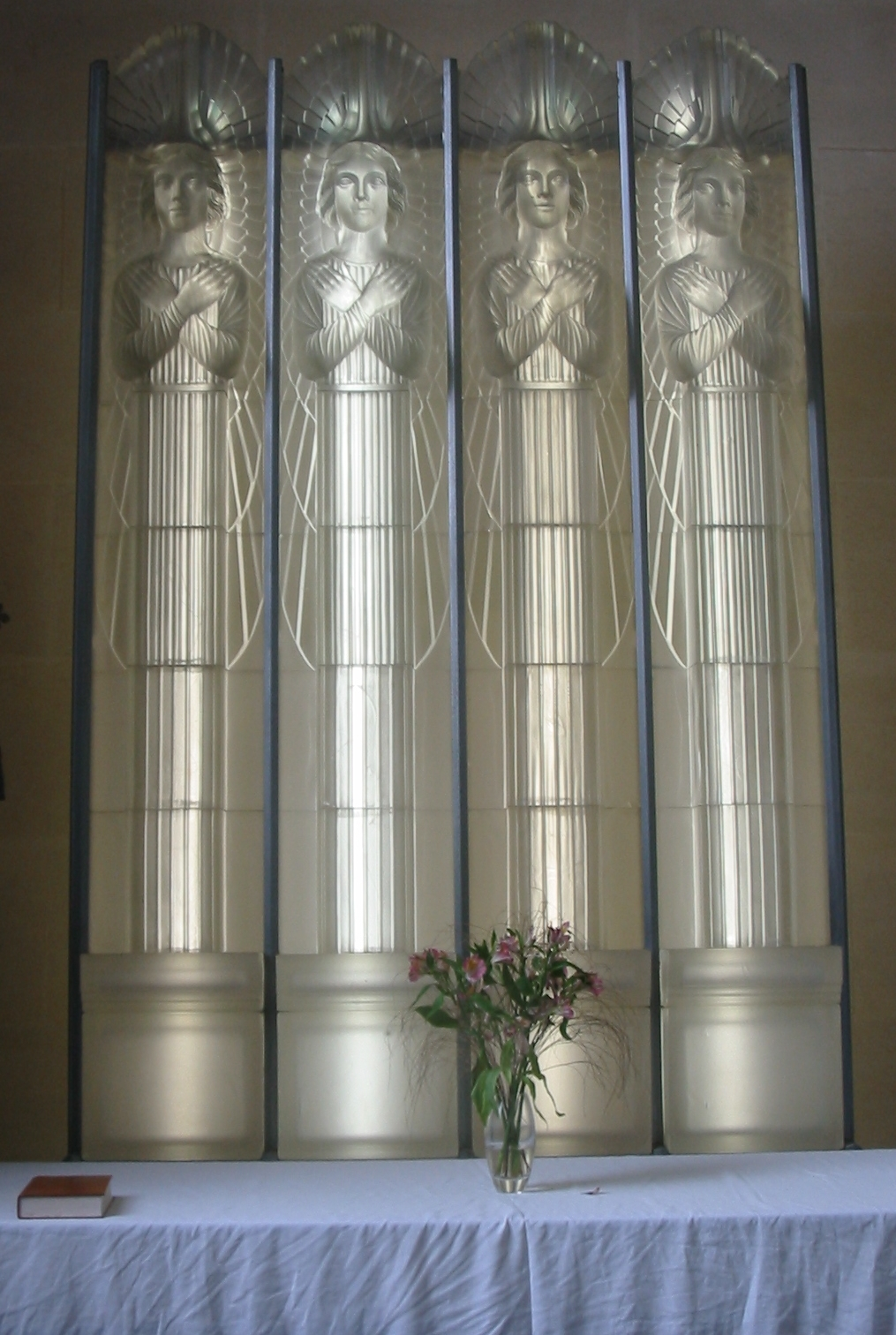
Lalique altarpiece in the Glass Church, St. Lawrence

The Glass Church in St Lawrence is decorated with Art Deco glass by René Lalique, commissioned by Florence, Lady Trent, the Jersey-born wife of Lord Trent, founder of Boots Chemists. No similar Lalique commission survives elsewhere in the world.

Edmund Blampied (1886–1966), illustrator and artist, is the most popular Jersey artist of the 20th century.

John St. Helier Lander (1869–1944), born in St. Helier, later became a fashionable portrait painter in London. His portrait of George V hangs at Victoria College, and the Masonic Temple in St. Helier holds a number of masonic portraits by him.

Philip John Ouless (1817–1885), a successful workmanlike painter of marine subjects, was the father of Walter William Ouless RA (1848–1933), who developed a career as a portrait painter in London, becoming an Associate of the Royal Academy (ARA) in 1877 and RA in 1881.

Henry Bosdet (1857–1934), an artist in stained glass in a Pre-Raphaelite style, taught in the Royal Academy schools in London. Some of his work can be seen in his native Island.

Suzanne Malherbe and Claude Cahun, the "Surrealist Sisters" were among photographers attracted to Jersey.

Sir Francis Cook (1907–1978), English painter, moved to Jersey in 1948. In the 1960s he bought the former Methodist chapel at Augrès and converted it to a studio and gallery which was donated after his death to the Jersey Heritage Trust along with a collection of his works. The building, now named the Sir Francis Cook Gallery, serves as an exhibition space.

The Berni Gallery at the Jersey Arts Centre holds a programme of exhibitions by Jersey and visiting artists. The Barreau-Le Maistre Gallery in the Jersey Museum displays works from the permanent collection of the Jersey Heritage trust. Plans for a National Gallery to display the range of national holdings of visual art and provide suitable temporary exhibition space have been proposed from time to time. A National Gallery steering group chaired by Philip Bailhache, Bailiff of Jersey, is due to report by the end of 2007. A site for the National Gallery has been earmarked on the site of the former Weighbridge bus station in St Helier, funded by waterfront development.

== Performing arts ==
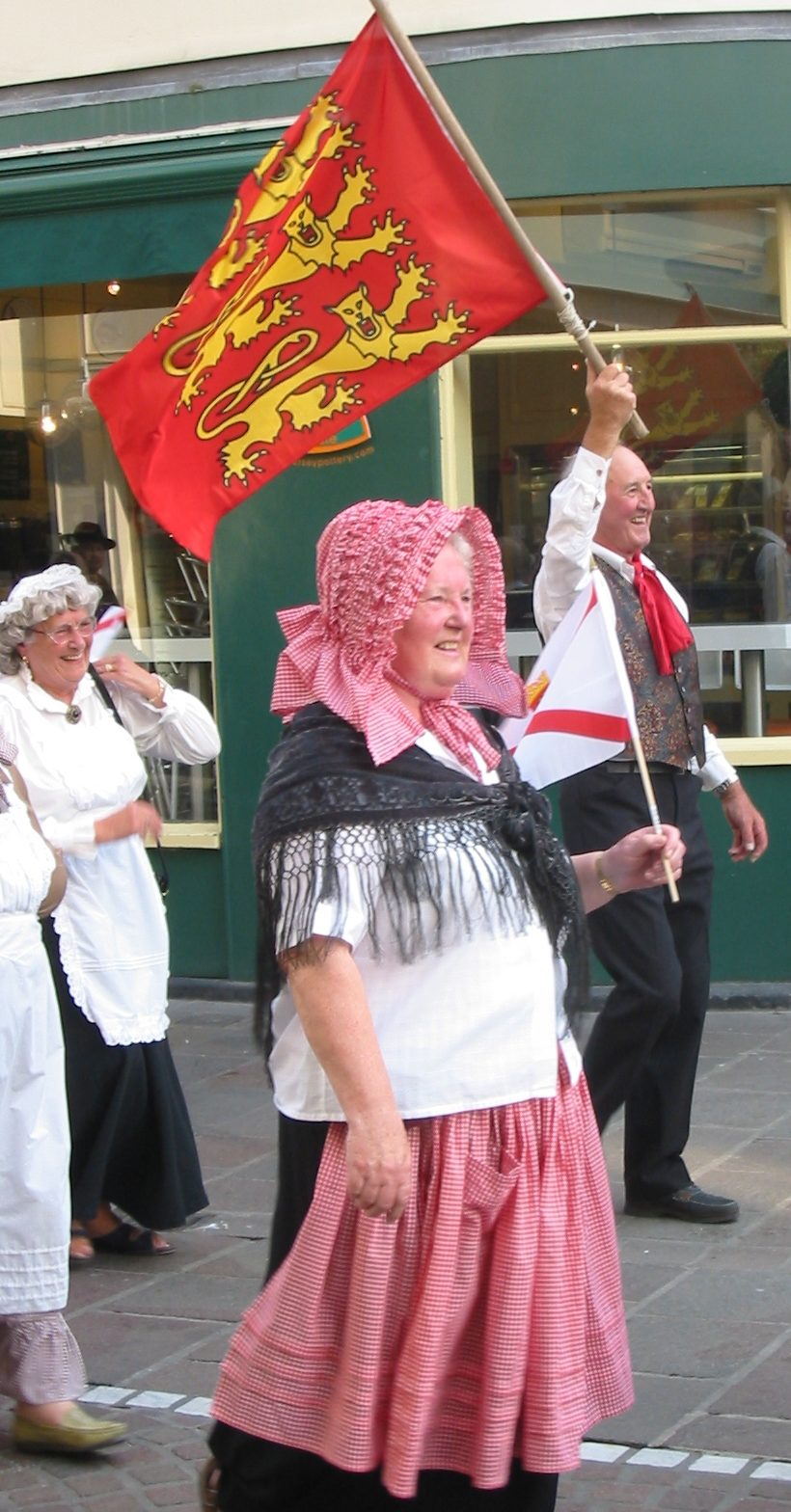
Performers in traditional Jersey costume at a cultural festival

The annual Jersey Eisteddfod provides a platform for competition in music, drama and speaking in English, French and Jèrriais.

The Opera House, opened by Lillie Langtry in 1900, and the Jersey Arts Centre are the main performance spaces, although many concerts and other cultural events take place in parish halls and other venues.

In 1995 the States of Jersey became the new owner of the Jersey Opera House at a cost of £1.3 million. In January 1997 the theatre closed for a major restoration project. A proposition was presented to the States of Jersey for a loan of £5.5 million to add to the £1.5 million that had been raised by the good will of the people and businesses of Jersey. This was successful and this major programme of work started in August 1998. After an extensive programme of rebuilding and renovation the new theatre opened its door on 9 July 2000 exactly 100 years to the day when the first Opera House had opened its doors to the public of Jersey.

Work on the Jersey Arts Centre started in 1981 when the Education Committee made available the redundant domestic science building in Saint Helier. The complex was opened by the Bailiff in January 1983 and various components of the building were subsequently completed: the Berni Gallery opened later in 1983, and the first performance took place in the shell of the auditorium in January 1985 although the performance space was not completed until August 1986. In 1992 the public acquired the former garrison church of St James and work started in 1998 to convert it into an arts venue. From 2000 the Jersey Arts Centre has undertaken artistic programming for St James.

Lillie Langtry, the Jersey Lily, is the island's most widely recognised cultural icon. Other actors from Jersey have included Seymour Hicks, Ivy St Helier, and actor Henry Cavill (Showtime's the Tudors and the DC Comics film version of the Justice League).

=== Music and dance ===
The traditional folk music of Jersey was common in country areas until the mid-20th century. It cannot be separated from the musical traditions of continental Europe, and the majority of songs and tunes that have been documented have close parallels or variants, particularly in France. Most of the surviving traditional songs are in French, with a minority in Jèrriais. The majority of Jèrriais-language songs are composed pieces dating from the 19th and 20th centuries, and not of folk origin. Research conducted in the 20th century also revealed the existence of folk songs in English (e.g. "The Greenland Whale Fishery", "Died for Love".) Only one folk song is believed to be of specifically Jersey provenance with no variants collected elsewhere: "La Chanson de Peirson".

Very little survives of an indigenous musical or dance tradition. Written testimony from the 20th century (Frank Le Maistre; George F. Le Feuvre) points to the practice of archaic dance-forms such as the "ronde" or round dance, 18th-century dances such as the cotillon and 19-century forms such as the polka, the schottische and the quadrille. Dances such as the "Gigoton" and "La Bébée" are both forms of polka. The violin, the chifournie (hurdy-gurdy), and later the accordion were traditional instruments for sonneurs (country dances). The decline of these dances has often been ascribed to the influence of Nonconformist Christianity that discouraged such cultural frivolities, or at least placed such a low value on these activities that they were not thought worth recording. It is more likely that, as in many other parts of Europe, they were a victim of changing fashion and a cultural shift away from traditional regional society and toward English-speaking modernity.

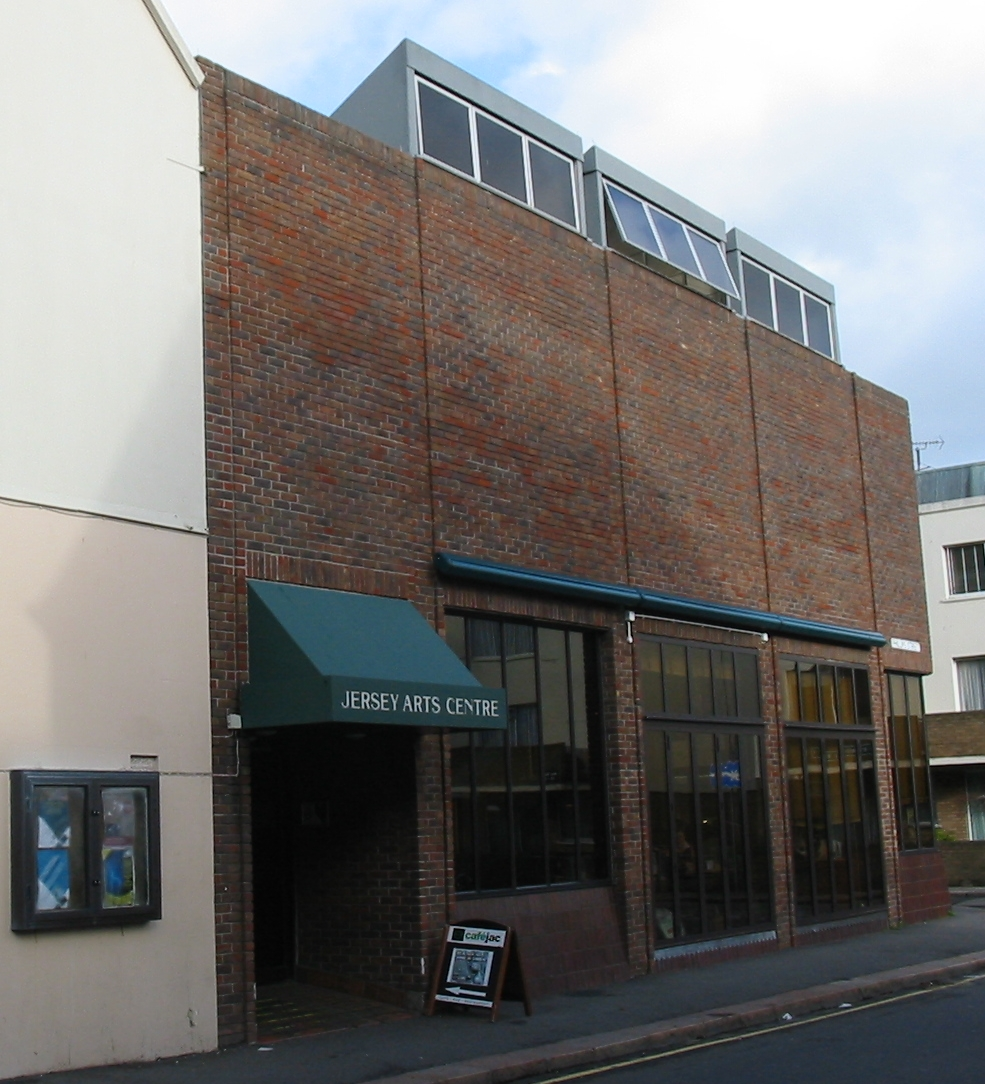
The Jersey Arts Centre includes a 250-seat theatre, the Berni Gallery exhibition space, workshop rooms and a café

There is also a lot of musical talent shown by the younger community of Jersey. The dominant genres are indie, punk and metal. The main event that these bands take part in is a Battle of the Bands each summer, the most recent winners being No Star Hotel. The bands often have trouble getting their music well known due to the isolation of the island. However, pop singer Nerina Pallot has enjoyed international success.

Music events include the Liberation Jersey Music Festival.

==== Grassroots Festival ====
Grassroots was a boutique summer music festival held in July, in front of Val de la Mare Reservoir sitting directly back from St Ouen's Bay. The 2011 festival attracted over 4,200 visitors, but after the event the organisers left debts of £114,143.

==== Jersey Live ====
Jersey Live was a two-day indie/dance music festival that was held annually at The Royal Jersey Showground in Trinity from 2004 until 2016. The festival grew in popularity and size each year since its inception and drew interest from people outside the Channel Islands with foreign visitors making up approximately 27% of the 2006 crowd. Artists to have performed at Jersey Live Festival include Snow Patrol, Ed Sheeran, The Prodigy, Jake Bugg, Noel Gallagher, The Gaa Gaas, Fatboy Slim, Ben Howard, Ellie Goulding, Kasabian & Calvin Harris to name a few.

== Television and radio ==
In the Channel Islands, broadcasting laws are managed by the UK Government and Ofcom on behalf of the islands' governments. The islands have access to the same television channels as the United Kingdom and many of the same national radio stations, such as BBC Radio. The Channel Islands Competition and Regulatory Authorities manages the level of demand for spectrum in the islands and makes recommendations to Ofcom for their management; however, Ofcom is charged with issuing licenses.

Jersey has television licenses in line with the same system used in the United Kingdom. A license is required to use a television set video recorder, DVD player or computer, which is capable of receiving broadcast programmes in the Bailiwick or elsewhere in the British Islands. As of 2013, the license for a colour television or television-enabled computer is £145.50. The license fee is used to fund public broadcasting across the British Islands.

Although the Channel Islands have the same television channels as the United Kingdom, such as the BBC and Sky, the BBC and ITV plc operate regional channels in the islands, BBC One Channel Islands and ITV Channel Television respectively. Their main studios are based in St Helier. The question of balance of coverage between the two bailiwicks is a matter of long-running debate, especially as most of the content is broadcast from Jersey. ITV and the BBC both produce a daily news programme for the islands, as well as posting island news articles on their websites.

The introduction of an ITV franchise posed a problem to the Independent Television Authority, as, constitutionally, the Television Act 1954 did not apply to the islands, so the ITA's ability to operate there had to be permitted by means of extending the Act to the islands by means of an Order in Council. Due to a technicality that prevented the Channel Islands from receiving colour television, Channel could only broadcast in black and white until 1976.

Due to the proximity to France, French television is fairly easily received as well, and British channels can be picked up on the neighbouring coast of the Norman mainland.

One of the best known portrayals of Jersey on the small screen was the BBC's crime drama Bergerac, featuring John Nettles as Jim Bergerac as a policeman in "Le Bureau des Étrangers" (a fictional department, based on the real Bureau des Étrangers, for dealing with non-Jersey residents). This was filmed mainly in Jersey, but storylines increasingly moved further afield to England and France. Another series filmed in Jersey is the Real Housewives of Jersey, part of the Real Housewives series.

Jersey has two local radio stations, BBC Radio Jersey and Channel 103 - a private operator.

== Religion ==
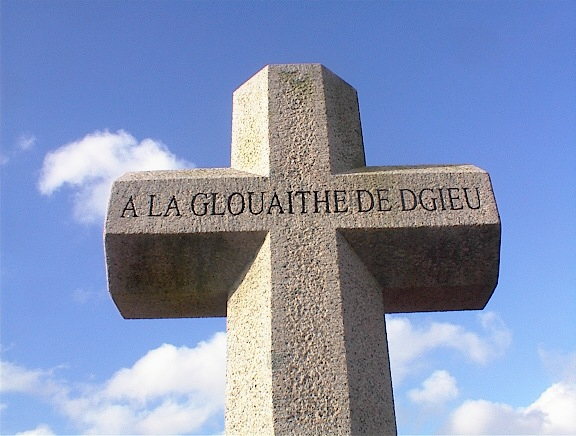
To mark the millennium in 2000, a cross was erected in each of the 12 parishes to replace the wayside crosses that fell subject to the iconoclasm of the 16th century. Here, the millennium cross of Saint Helier bears the Jèrriais inscription À la glouaithe dé Dgieu (To the glory of God).

The island's patron saint is Saint Helier.

The established church is the Church of England, but Methodism has been historically strong, especially in country areas, and remains influential. A large minority of the population is Roman Catholic. The historic toleration of religious minorities has led to many persecuted minorities seeking refuge in Jersey. This has left a rich legacy of churches, chapels and places of worship.

== Folklore and customs ==
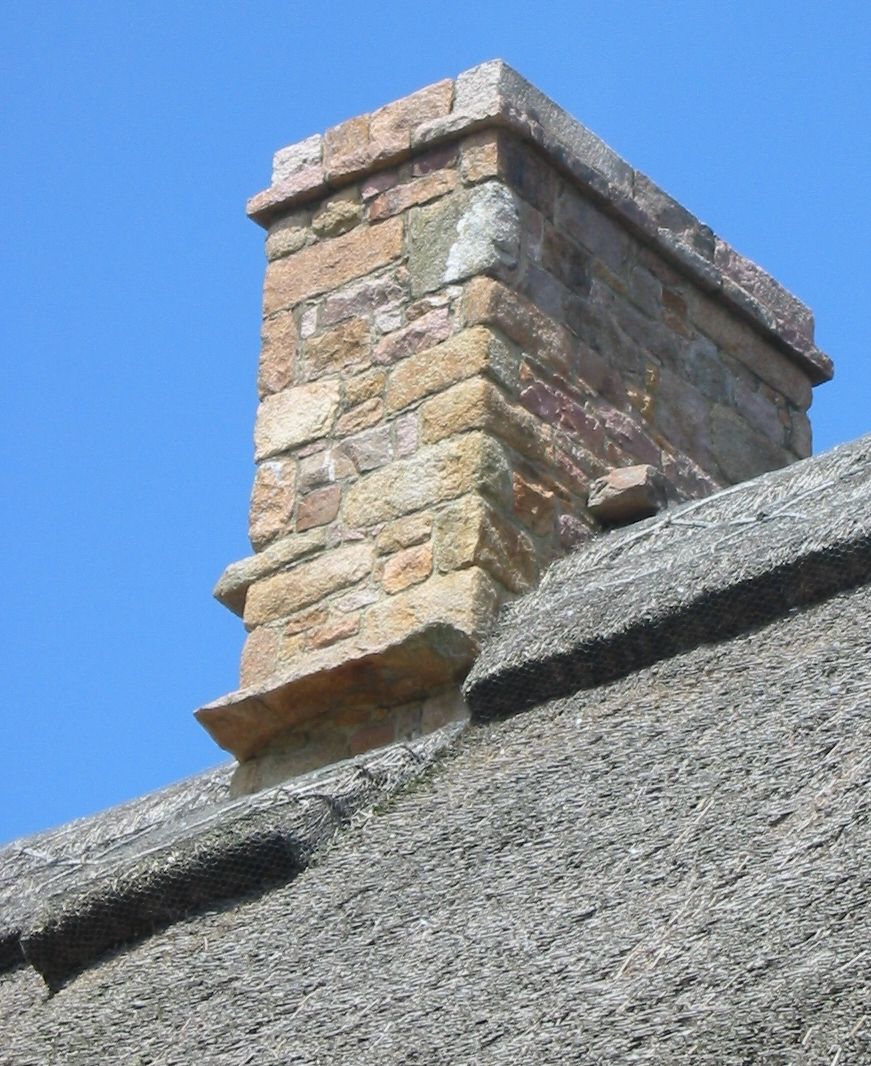
Witches' stones on thatched roof

Jersey people are traditionally known as crapauds (toads) due to the particular fauna of Jersey that does not exist in the other Channel Islands, especially in Guernsey. According to a Guernsey legend, St Samson of Dol arrived in Jersey but encountered such a hostile reception on the then-pagan island that he proceeded on to Guernsey. The welcome being much warmer in Guernsey, he repaid the inhabitants of that island by sending all the snakes and toads from Guernsey to Jersey.

Vraic is the Jersey word for seaweed, and the collection of seaweed for fertiliser, vraicking, an important activity in the past, still continues on a small scale.

The Battle of Flowers is the major carnival, held annually in August. First held for the coronation of Edward VII in 1902, the carnival includes a parade of floral decorated floats. Originally, these floats were torn apart to provide floral ammunition for a battle of flowers between participants and spectators, but this aspect has long been abandoned.

Annual visites du branchage are carried out twice in summer by parish officials to inspect roadside verges and hedges and ensure property owners have trimmed back overhanging greenery. This custom is to prevent Jersey's narrow lanes becoming hazardous or impassable through overgrown vegetation. The action of branchage (pronounced in the Jèrriais fashion, "brancage", as opposed to the French pronunciation) is the trimming of verges prior to the annual inspections. A haircut may also be jocularly referred to as a branchage.

Belief in witchcraft was formerly strong in Jersey, and survived in country areas well into the 20th century. Witches were supposed to hold their sabbats on Fridays at Rocqueberg, the Witches' Rock, in St. Clement. Folklore preserves a belief that witches' stones on old houses were resting places for witches flying to their meetings.

Every third year, Jersey hosts "La fête Nouormande", a folk festival centring on the Norman culture and heritage of the island, which attracts performers and visitors from Guernsey and the continent.

=== Past traditions ===
A past rural tradition was La Jouête, which took place on Shrove Tuesday, Easter Monday and other holidays. Islanders would be invited (for a fee) to throw stones at either cocks, ducks, hens, rabbits or similar. He who killed the animal would be able to take it as a prize. They were brought to end in 1896 by the Law to prevent the bad treatment of animals (though it is believed the tradition continued until 1906 nonetheless).

On Good Fridays of the past, it was tradition for Jerseymen to travel for a picnic. Limpets would be collected from the rocks and cooked on the spot with bread cake eaten hot with butter. Later on, eating hot cross buns became popular as well.

== National identity ==
Jersey has often been patriotic about its connection with the British Crown, and by extension the UK itself. In 1833, a list of public houses in St Helier include two named the 'Britannia', the 'Crown and Thistle', 'George III', the King's Arms', the 'King's Head', the Robin Hood', three named the 'Royal George', 'True Britain', and 'Waterloo'. On Mulcaster Street, a pub now named the Lamplighter features on its edifice a seated figure of Britannia holding a shield and trident, with a flagstaff displaying the Union Jack.

== Food and drink ==
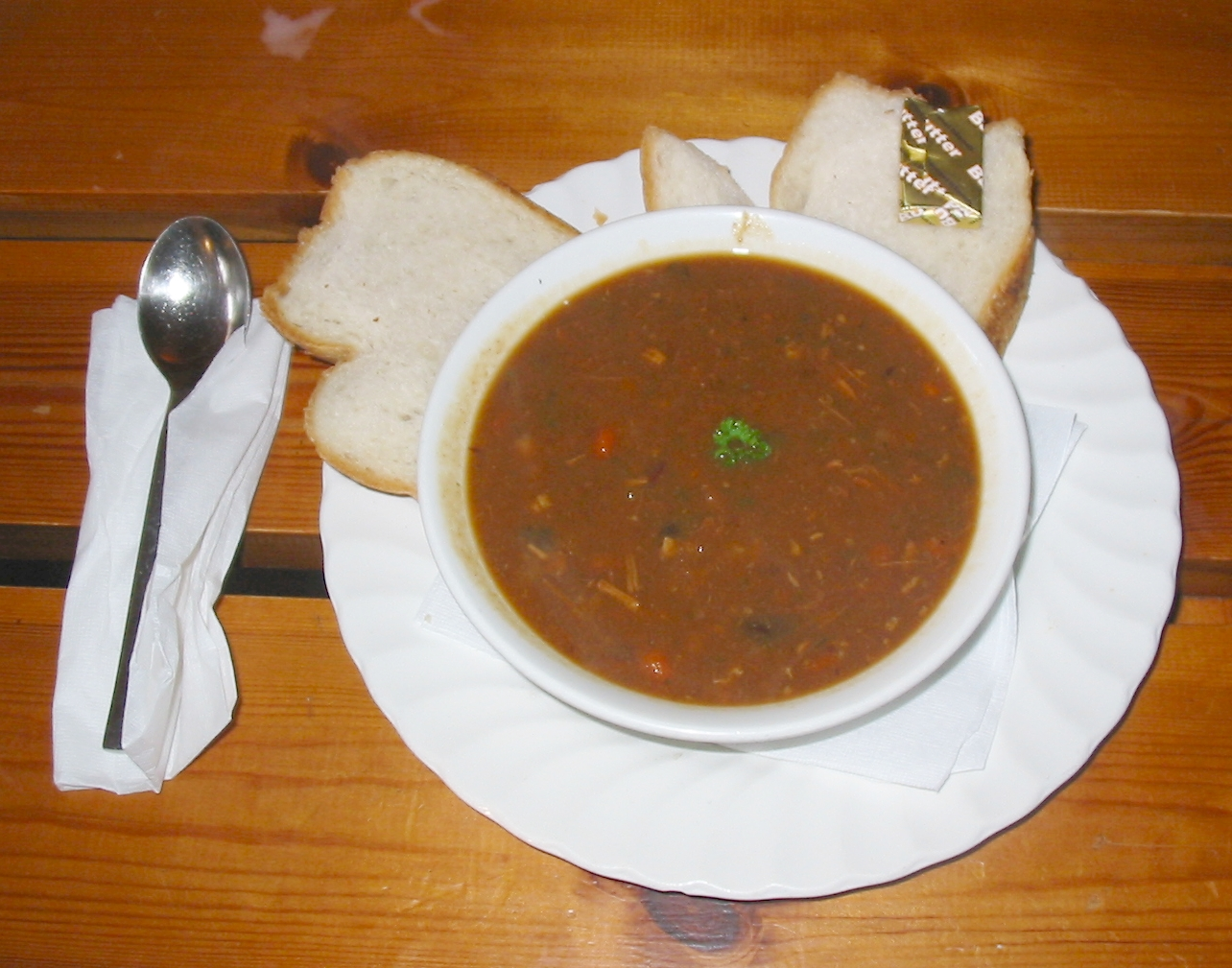
Des pais au fou: bean crock, accompanied by slices of cabbage loaf

Seafood has traditionally been important to the cuisine of Jersey: mussels (called moules locally), scallops, oysters, lobster and crabs — especially spider crabs which are considered a particular delicacy. Razor-fishing, sand-eeling and limpeting used to be popular activities but have declined in importance. Ormers, being highly sought after, are conserved and fishing is restricted. Another seafood speciality is conger soup.

Bean crock (les pais au fou) can best be described as a sort of Norman cassoulet. It is a slow-cooked pork and bean stew, most authentically containing a pig's trotter, water and onions. In the past the dish was so ubiquitous that English-speaking visitors, purporting to believe that the people of Jersey ate nothing else, dubbed the inhabitants Jersey beans (this epithet is sometimes considered derogatory, but a Jersey primary school French coursebook Salut Jersey featured two beans Haricot and Mangetout).

Nettle (ortchie) soup was once a popular dish and was considered a tonic for the heart.

Jersey wonders (les mèrvelles), a sort of rich twisted doughnut, is made less in the home than formerly but is still a popular treat at fairs and festivals. A sort of wonder poached in milk is known as a fliotte (eune fliotte).

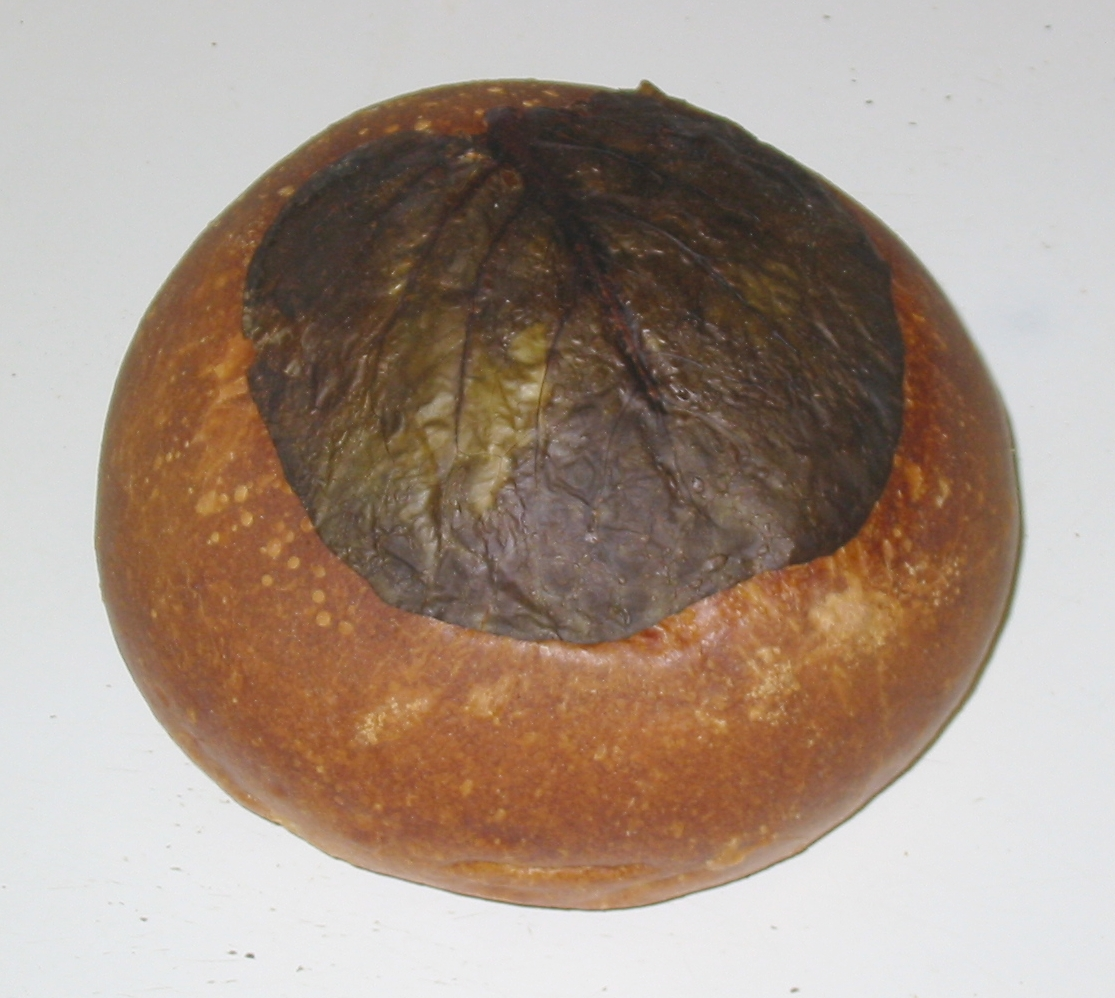
Cabbage loaf

Cabbage loaf is the traditional Jersey bread baked between two cabbage leaves. Historically, Jersey produced sturdy walking sticks fashioned from the stalks of cabbages, known as "Tall Jacks", which had been induced to grow tall stalks by removing leaves around the heart.

Vraic buns are very large sweet buns with raisins, and were traditionally eaten when men went out vraicing on the shore.

Hot cross buns, a popular food around Easter in England, were not introduced to the island until the nineteenth century, but are now readily available.

Jersey milk being very rich, cream and butter have played a large part in insular cooking. Unlike other parts of the Duchy of Normandy, there is no historical tradition of cheese; Jersey people have traditionally preferred rich yellow thickly spread butter.

Jersey Royal potatoes are the local variety of new potato, and the island is famous for its early crop of small, flavourful potatoes from the south-facing côtils (steeply-sloping fields). They are eaten in a variety of ways, often simply boiled and served with butter.

Apples historically were an important crop. Bourdélots are apple dumplings, but the most typical speciality is black butter (lé nièr beurre), a dark spicy spread prepared from apples, cider and spices (especially liquorice). Although called butter, it does not contain any milk. It is traditional to hold black butter nights (séthées d'nièr beurre) in autumn. These are still an important traditional social occasion in country areas; the stirring must be maintained around the clock. The complete process of making black butter, including the peeling of the apples, the stirring of the mixture in a large cauldron throughout the night, the camaraderie and the jarring up was recorded by the filmmaker D. Rusowsky for a 48-minute documentary. Reviving the tradition supports the conservation of traditional orchards, which are highly endangered.

Cider used to be an important export. After decline and near-disappearance in the late 20th century, apple production is being increased and promoted. Calvados is also produced. Some wine is produced.

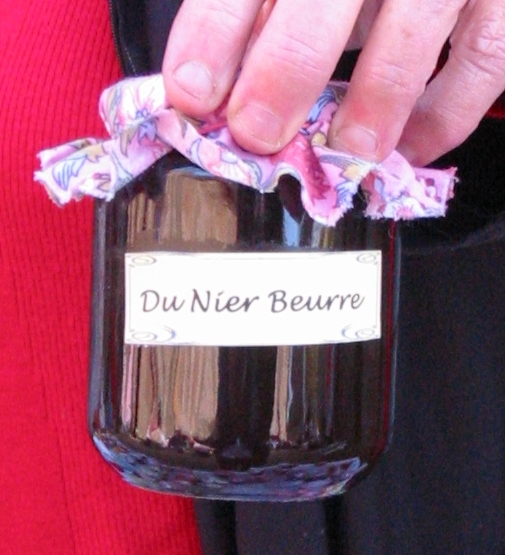
A jar of black butter

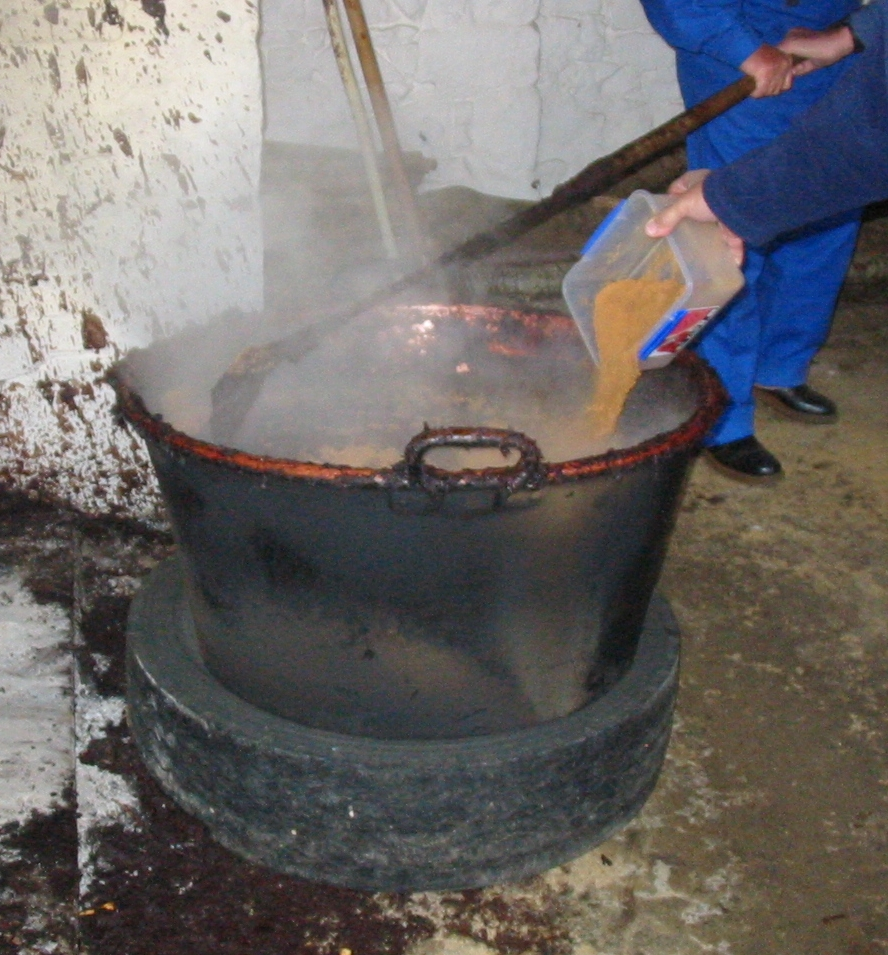
Adding spices during black butter making

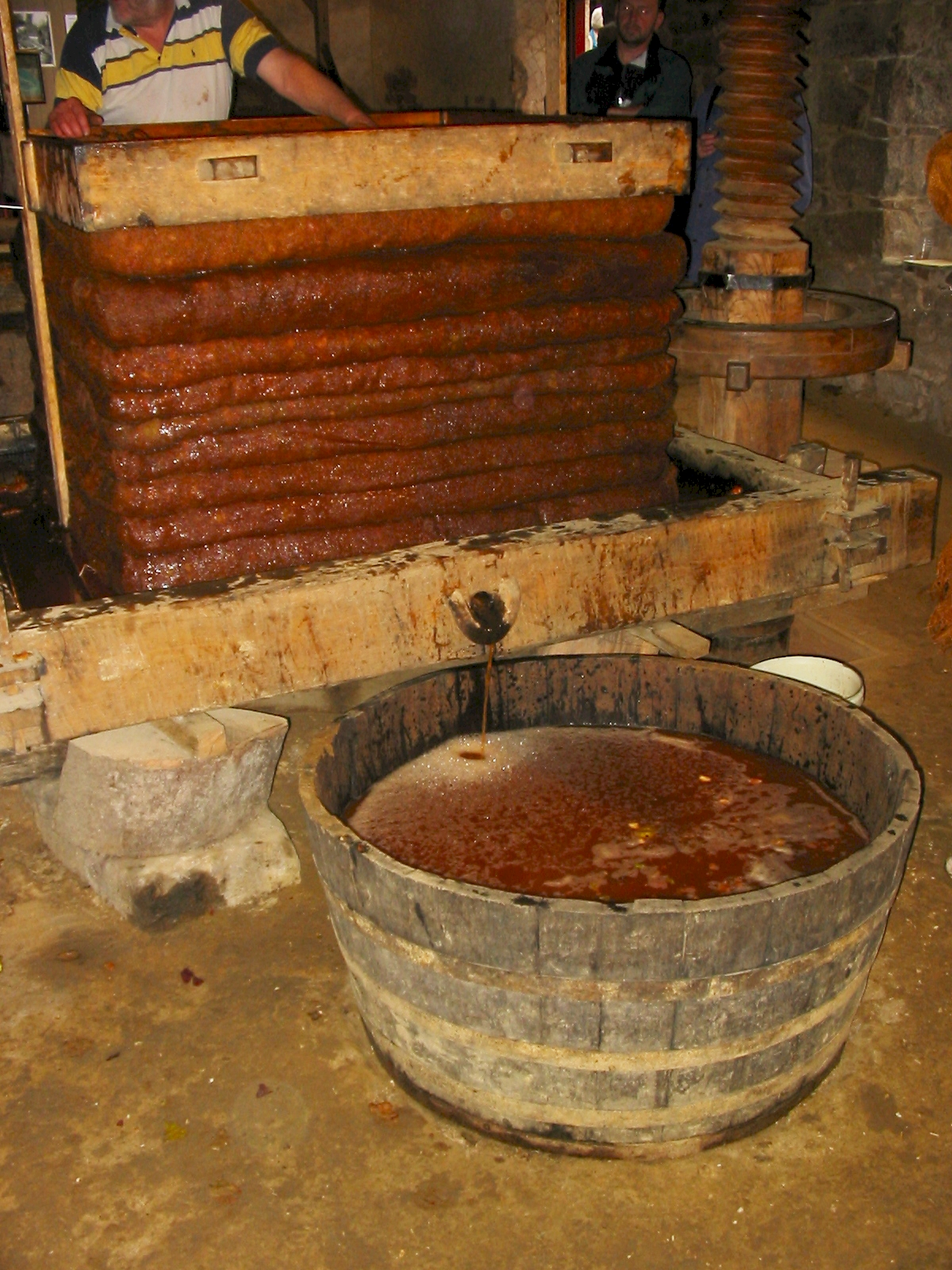
Cider-making traditions are maintained in Jersey at the annual Faîs'sie d'cidre festival. At the museum at Hamptonne, the old cider press is in action.

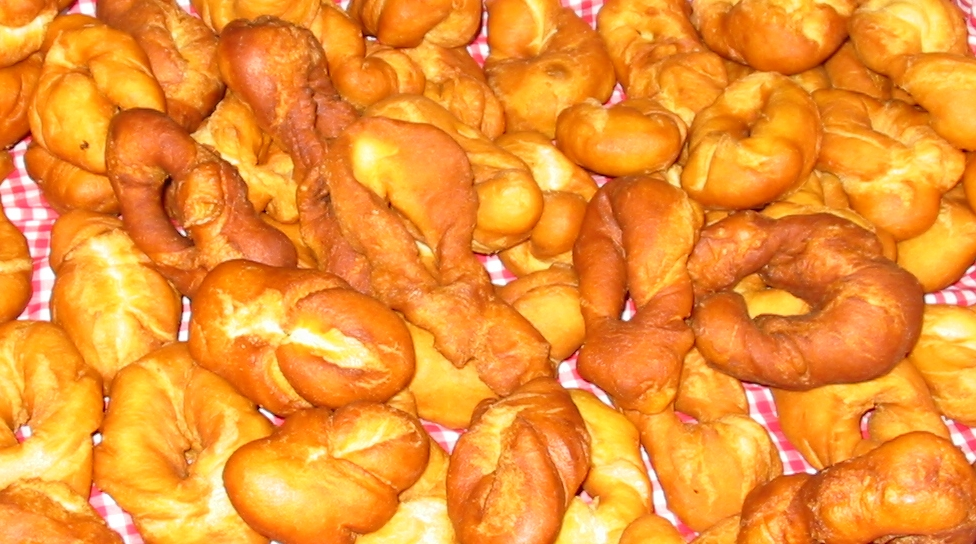
Mèrvelles - Jersey wonders

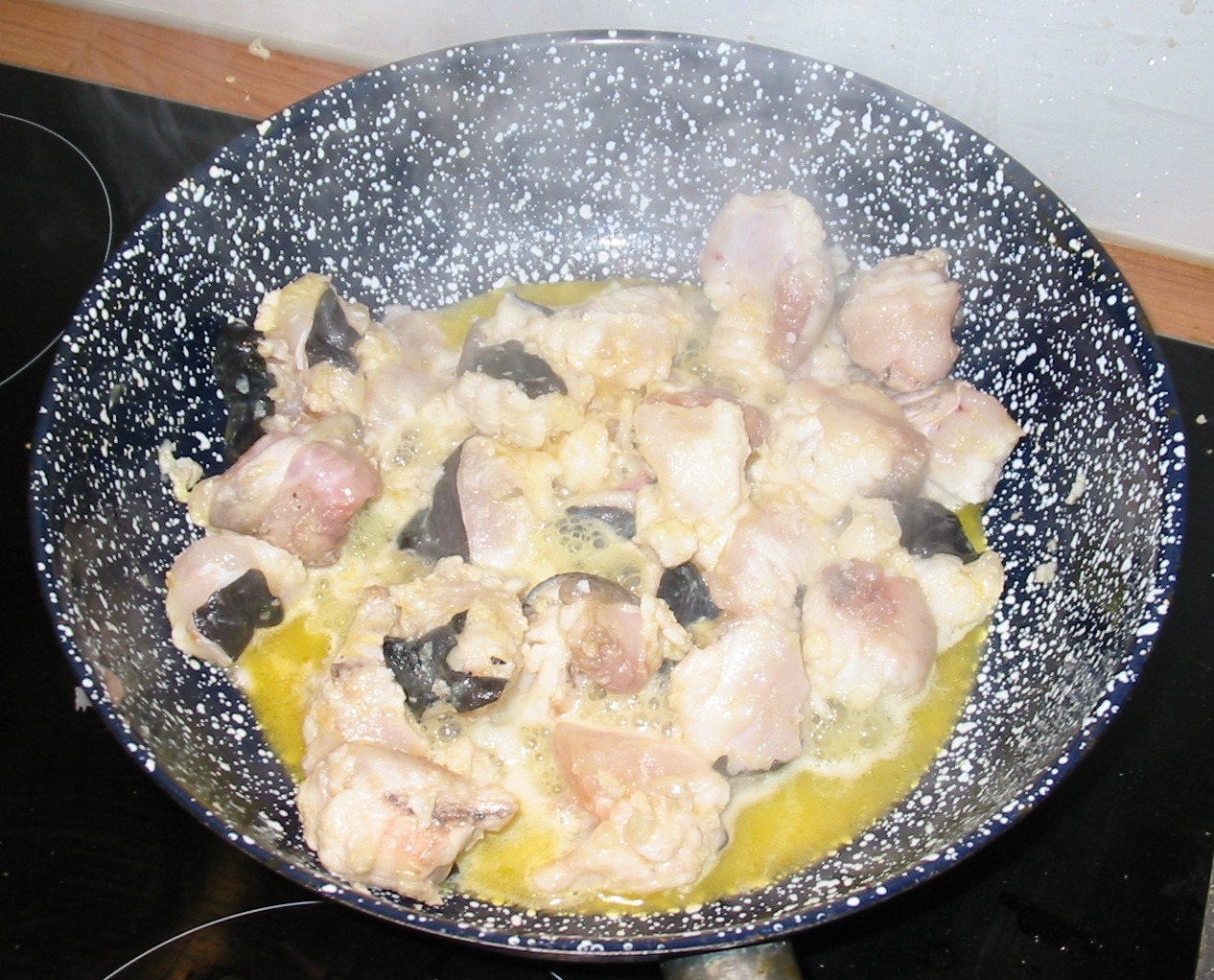
Frying conger

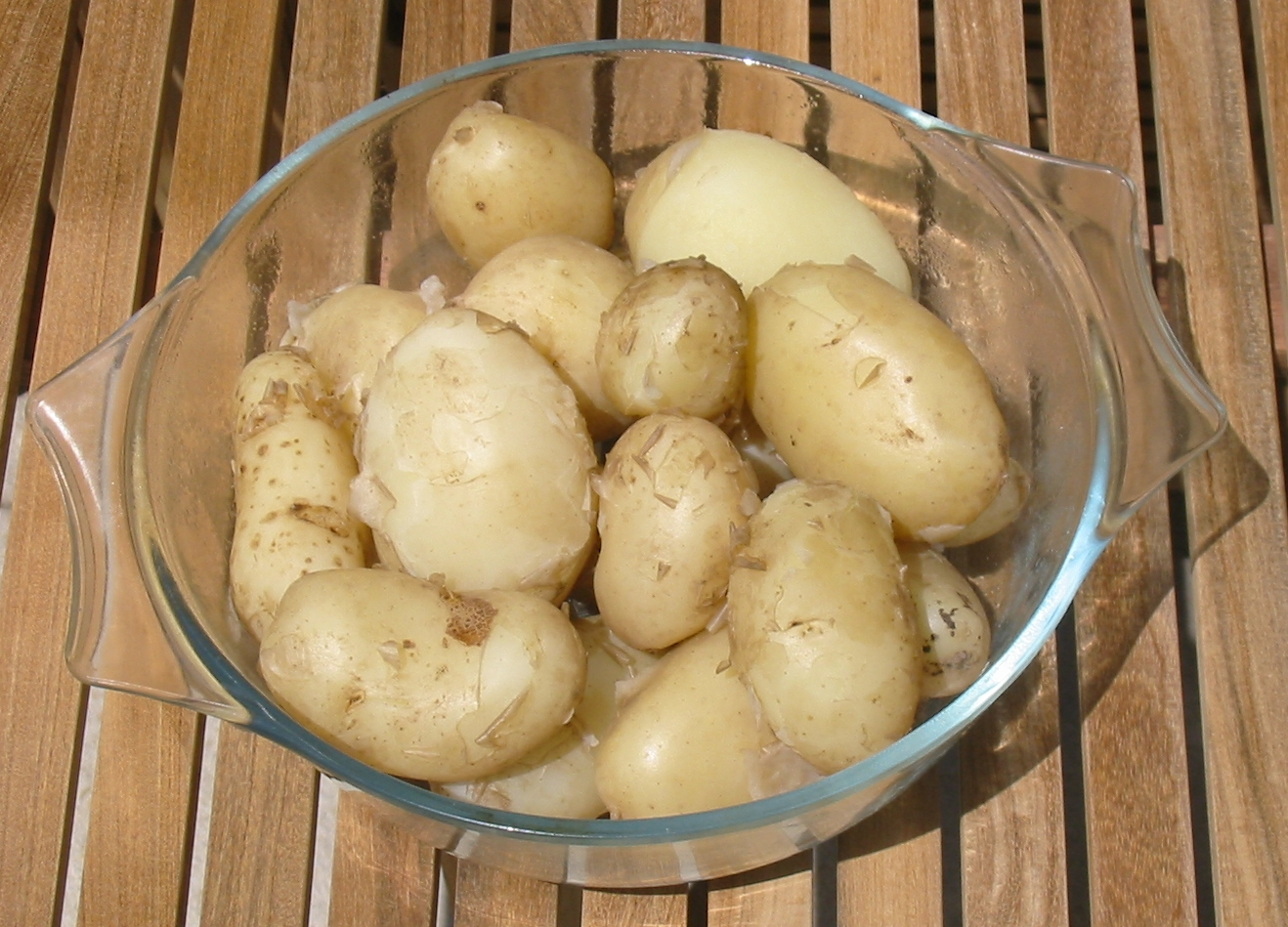
Boiled Jersey Royal potatoes

== Sport ==
Jersey participates in its own right in the Commonwealth Games, in which shooting is a strong sport. Golf is also popular – Harry Vardon was a Jerseyman.

Jersey participates in the Island Games, which it has hosted. In sporting events in which Jersey does not have international representation, when the British Home Nations are competing separately, islanders that do have high athletic skill may choose to compete for any of the Home Nations - there are, however, restrictions on subsequent transfers to represent another Home Nation.

The Muratti football match against Guernsey is one of the sporting highlights of the year. There are several rugby clubs in the island, including a rugby academy for under 18s and Les Quennevais Rugby Club.

== Education ==
- Highlands College provides post-16 vocational education, adult education and degree-level education.

== See also ==
- Crown and Anchor
- Jersey cricket team
- Jersey Football Association
- Jersey national football team
- Liberation Day
- Media of Jersey
- National Trust for Jersey
