= RJA =

RJA can refer to

- Rajahmundry Airport, in India (IATA airport code RJA)
- The Red Jumpsuit Apparatus, a post-hardcore band from Middleburg, Florida
- RJA&HS, Royal Jersey Agricultural and Horticultural Society
- ICAO designator for Royal Jordanian, a Jordanian airline
