= John Le Capelain =

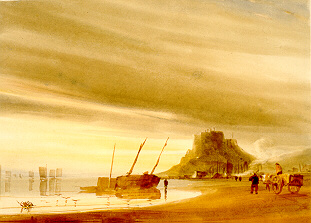
Le Capelain, Landscape from Jersey.

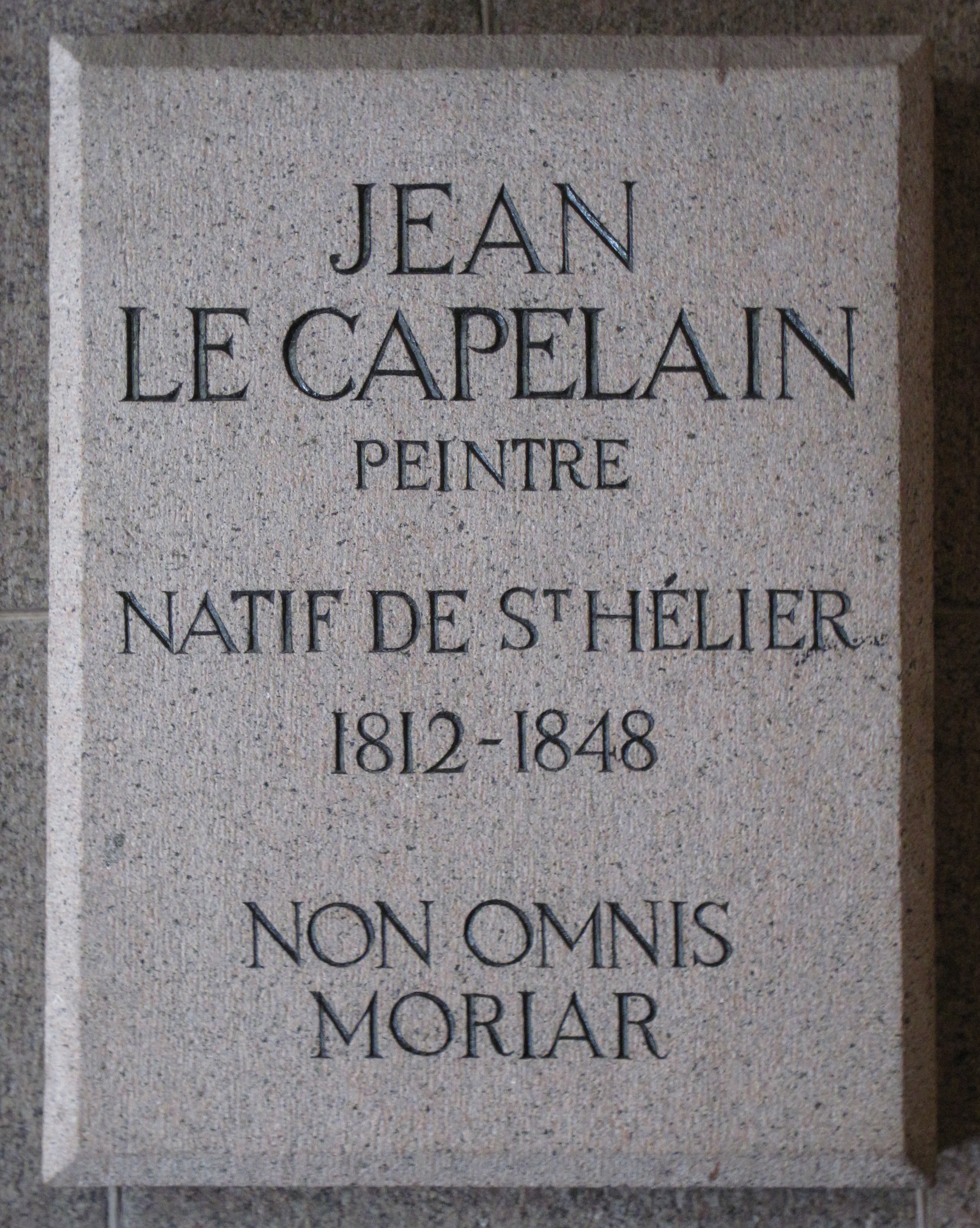
Jean Le Capelain (plaque in Saint Helier).

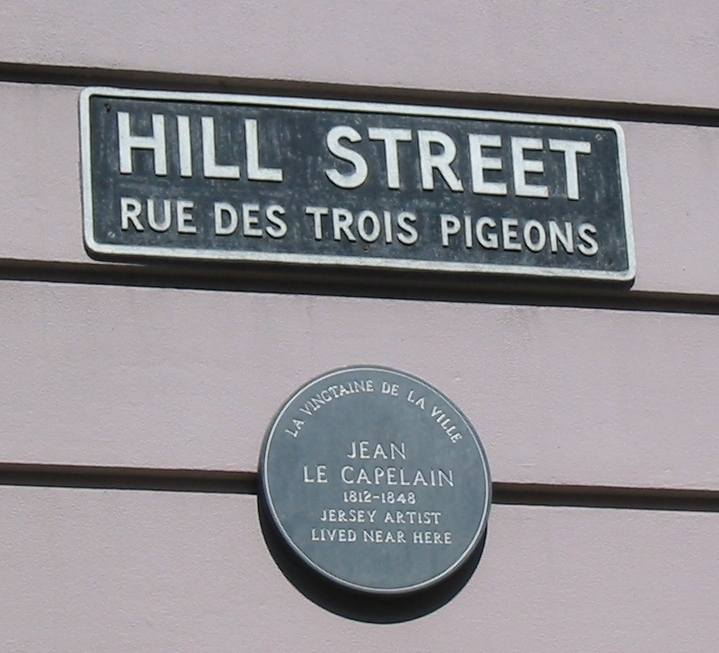
A plaque in St Helier marks the approximate site of the artist's house and studio.

John Le Capelain, later known as Jean, (1812–1848) was a painter often claimed to have been born in Saint Helier, Jersey, the son of Samuel Le Capelain, a printer and lithographer, and Elizabeth Anne Pinckney, his English wife. He was actually born in London and baptised there two days after his parents married there. After returning to his father's native island, he followed his father's trade in lithography but abandoned it later in life. He also learned the art of painting, without any formal training. About 1832 he returned to London and practiced as water-colour painter. His technique gave his paintings a particularly misty and foggy effect. After Queen Victoria's visit to Jersey in 1846, a volume of drawings by Le Capelain of scenery of the island was presented to her as an official souvenir by the States of Jersey. This led to his receiving a commission from the Queen to paint pictures of the Isle of Wight. While engaged on these he developed tuberculosis, of which he died in Jersey in 1848.

A view of Mont Orgueil by Le Capelain was used on the reverse of the 1976 Jersey £20 banknote.

== Public collections ==
The Jersey Heritage Trust today holds some of his paintings.

A collection of his works, presented by public subscription in his memory, is displayed in the Parish Hall of St. Helier.

Following the refurbishment of the States Building in the Royal Square during 2001 / 2003, two rooms were provided for the newly constituted scrutiny side of the States. One of the rooms is named the "Le Capelain Room" after the artist. A number of copies of some of his paintings are displayed in this room. The other scrutiny room is named "The Blampied Room" after Edmund Blampied. As with the Le Capelain room, a number of copies of the artist's work are displayed in the room.

== See also ==
- Culture of Jersey (Art)
