= Sarah Louisa Kilpack =

English painter

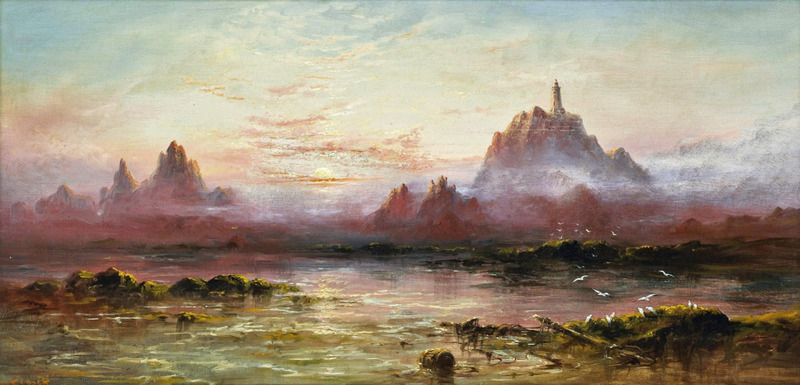
La Corbière Lighthouse, Jersey, at Sunset

Sarah Louisa Kilpack (1839–1909) or Sarah Louise Kilpack was a British artist and musician who is best known for her portrayals of stormy coastal scenes.

== Life ==
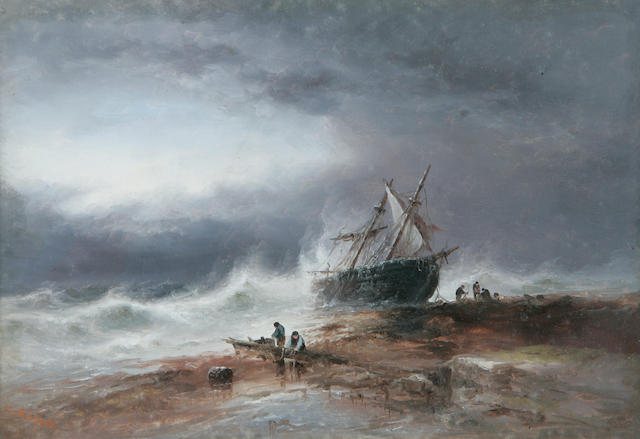
Ship on the Rocks

Kilpack was born in Covent Garden in London. Her father, Thomas, was the proprietor of a popular tobacconists and bowling alley called Gliddon's Divan. She was a talented but shy child, enjoying artistic pursuits including drawing and music. As a young woman she became a King's Scholar at the Royal Academy of Music, under the tutelage of Kate Loder. She became an Associate of the academy and began a career as a pianist, performing in concerts and providing tuition. Income from her musical work enabled her to travel outside of London, where she would sketch. The family became more dependent on the income from her concert playing particularly after the death of her mother in 1863.

At this time she first travelled to the Channel Islands where she became a frequent visitor. She remained somewhat distrustful of people, which is reflected in the stormy nature of many of her paintings. In 1876, following the demise of her father, she gave up music and concentrated on art. She became a very successful artist with a particular focus on marine art, exhibiting 119 landscapes at the Society of Women Artists between 1867 and 1909, and also at the British Institution. In the early 1880s she was earning about £500 a year from painting. She died in 1909 of cancer.

== Legacy ==
In 1989, a series of stamps was issued to mark the 150th anniversary of Sarah Louisa Kilpack's birth, highlighting her importance in the culture of Jersey. Her works are exhibited in the Jersey Museum and Art Gallery, and in the Rona Cole Art Gallery on Guernsey. Paintings by Kilpack can also be found at Chepstow Museum, Hastings Museum and Art Gallery and the National Trust property Belton House.
