= Royal Jersey Agricultural and Horticultural Society =

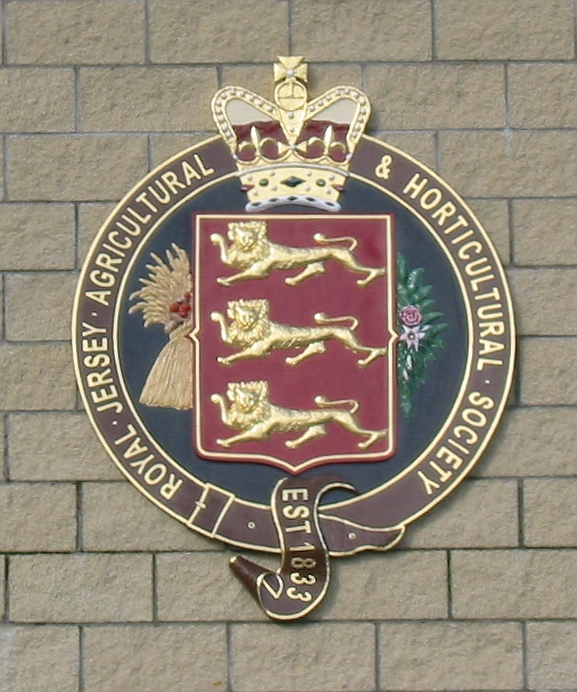
RJA&HS Crest

The Royal Jersey Agricultural & Horticultural Society (RJA&HS) is an agricultural association in Jersey. It has been instrumental in the development of the Jersey cow and its success throughout the world, and today is responsible for management of the breed in its Island home.

The Royal Jersey Showground, the Society's headquarters, also holds a wide range of indoor and outdoor events and provides meeting, conference and exhibition facilities.

== History of the Society ==
On the 26 August 1833 a meeting was held in St. Helier, chaired by the Lieutenant-Governor of Jersey, Major General Thornton, to consider forming an agricultural society. At this meeting it was unanimously agreed "...to be highly desirable to form in this Island an Agricultural and Horticultural Society".

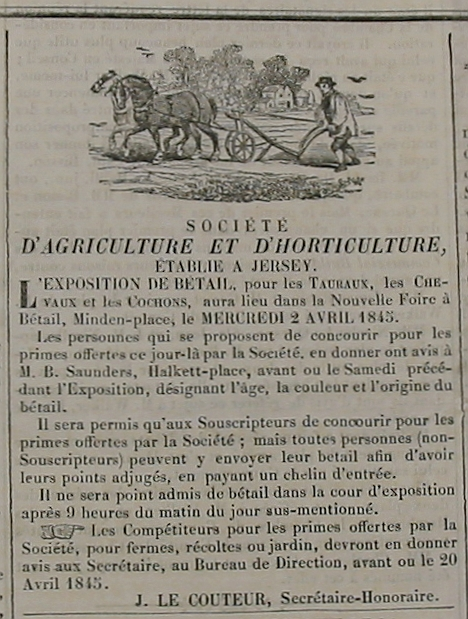
From its early years the Society organised cattle shows and competitions among growers and breeders, as shown in this advertisement of 1845

An earlier attempt to form an agricultural society in Jersey in 1790 had failed, but this time it was successful and the first meeting of the new society was held on the 7 September 1833. The aims of the new society were "to create a spirit of industry and emulation, to offer premiums for the improvement of agriculture, breeding of cattle, improved domestic economy, cleanliness and comfort in cottages, and also for the encouragement of industry and good behavior among servants and labourers in the employment of members or subscribers of the Society".

This was at a time during the 19th century, following the agricultural revolution in the United Kingdom, when many such societies were founded to communicate the latest improvements in agricultural practices to the farming community.

Today the RJA&HS is made up of two departments:

- The Agricultural Department stages agricultural shows, provides a range of services to support the modern dairy industry and is primarily responsible for the management of the Jersey breed in the Island.
- The Horticultural Department is primarily concerned with the promotion of horticulture through talks, shows, garden competitions and general advice.

=== The RJA&HS Headquarters ===
The Royal Jersey Agricultural & Horticultural Society is the oldest society in the Island and during its life has occupied a number of premises in the Island's capital, Saint Helier. In 1834 the Society rented an office at 19 Halkett Place, moving to 19 Bath Street in 1865.

A permanent showground was established on meadow land, purchased in 1884, at the edge of St. Helier and was developed into the Springfield showground. Prior to this, shows were held at the Island's Cattle Market. In 1899 the Society's offices moved to 8 Church Street and in 1913 3 Mulcaster Street was purchased. In 1969 the Society's offices moved to a new building built at the Springfield showground. The showground itself had been enlarged and developed considerably since its original purchase, e.g. the construction of the Springfield Pavilion in 1922. The Springfield estate was sold to the States of Jersey in December 1995.

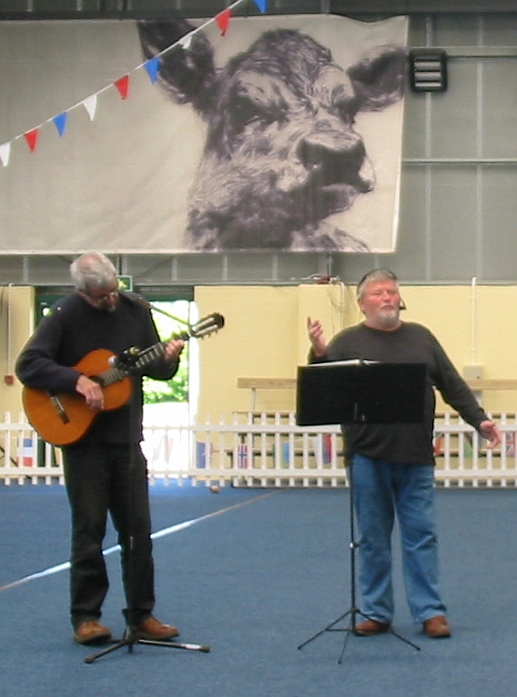
Musical performance in 2008 at the showground in Trinity

The Society relocated its operations to new office and showground facilities in September 2000. Located in the Parish of Trinity in the heart of the Island, these new Headquarters and showground were officially opened on 13 July 2001, by the Society's Patron, Her Majesty The Queen.

== Royal Patronage of the RJA&HS ==
When His Majesty King William IV conferred his Royal Patronage upon the Jersey Agricultural and Horticultural Society in 1834, he set a precedent that has been graciously continued by each successive Monarch since then.

In 1837 Her Majesty Queen Victoria ascended the Throne, and shortly after granted her Royal Patronage upon the Society. In June 1887 the Jubilee of Her Majesty Queen Victoria was celebrated with a combined show of the Society, at which the judging of cattle took place in public for the first time.

In January 1901, His Majesty King Edward VII granted his Royal Patronage to the Society. The next patron, His Majesty King George V, visited Jersey in 1921, when he was presented with a splendid specimen of the breed 'La Sente's Miss Bronzemine' at the Society's Springfield showground.

In 1936 His Majesty King George VI ascended the Throne and following in the footsteps of his predecessors and brother His Majesty King Edward VIII, granted Royal Patronage upon the Society.

Her Majesty Queen Elizabeth II ascended the Throne in 1952 and graciously granted Royal Patronage upon the Society. During visits to the Island Her Majesty has also been presented with prize 'Jersey' cows to join the Royal herd at Windsor.

== Agriculture in Jersey ==
The agricultural industry in Jersey has seen many changes over the centuries, which in turn have influenced the rural landscape of the Island and demonstrated the resourcefulness and adaptability of the Jersey farmer.

During the 17th century the wool and knitting industry dominated the rural economy. So much attention was paid to the production of woollen garments that legislation was introduced by the States to control the time devoted to knitting as the gathering of vraic (seaweed used for fertiliser) and harvesting were being neglected.

The 18th century saw the development of an apple growing and cider production industry. By the beginning of the 19th century some 13,500 vergées, or one quarter of the land area, were planted to apple trees with much of the cider production destined for export.

The cattle breeding and export industry expanded rapidly during the 19th century and lasted well into the 20th century. At a similar time the growing and export of early potatoes replaced apples as the major crop and by the beginning of the 20th century some 20,000 vergées were devoted to early potato production. At this time the Island also became renowned for the production of tomatoes and flowers.

Today, however, the dominant crop grown in the Island is the Jersey Royal potato. The story of the development of the 'Jersey Royal', a variety unique to the Island, is one in which the RJA&HS played an important part in the early development of the variety.

== The Jersey cow ==
=== The Jersey cow in the Island ===
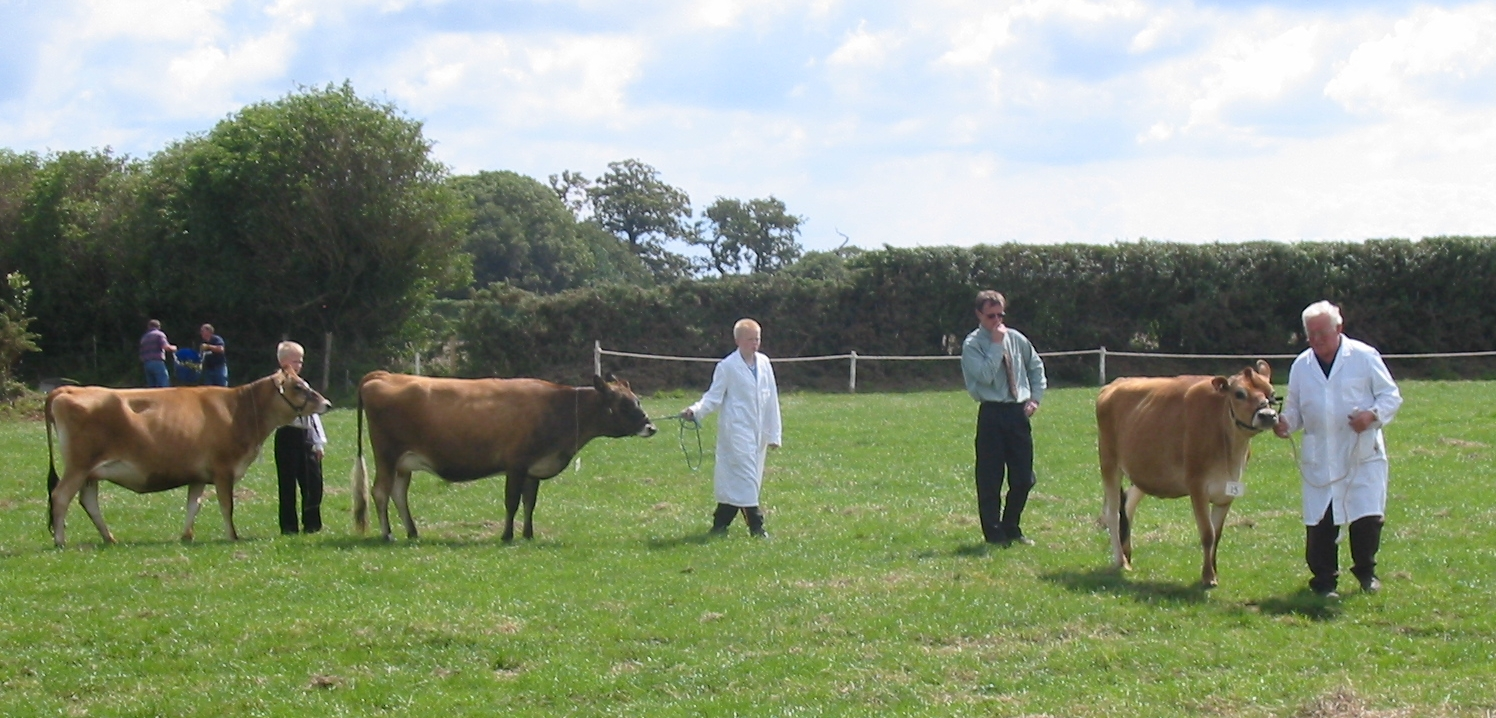
Jersey cows being judged in Jersey

The Jersey breed of dairy cow originates from the Island of Jersey and it is quite distinct from all other breeds of livestock. Renowned for its beauty, ease of management and natural ability to produce rich creamy milk, the 'Jersey' is a product of the Island, its soil, its climate, its people and their history.

The early influences on the breed are shrouded in obscurity, as with most domestic breeds, although legislation introduced by the States of Jersey in 1763 preventing the importation of cattle, to protect the local market for agricultural products, ensured the evolution of the 'Jersey' breed. Local farmers concentrated on developing their cattle from the limited local population and their skill 'fixed' the special characteristics of the 'Jersey' resulting in the cattle we see today. The Island breed is recognised internationally as a unique population of livestock.

The 'Jersey' is predominantly fawn in colour, although they can range from almost pure mulberry (black) to broken coloured, including patches of white. The most distinctive features of the 'Jersey' are its black nose with a mealy white band round it, the traditional dished face, refined bone and graceful beauty.

=== The Cattle Export Industry ===
The exportation of cattle from the Island commenced in the 18th century and during the 19th and 20th centuries became a very important industry in the Island as a result of the growing worldwide demand for Jersey cattle.

There is evidence of 'Jerseys' being exported to England during the 17th century and records show Jersey cattle being exported to America by 1850, Australia by 1854, New Zealand by 1862, Canada by 1868, South Africa by 1877, Sweden by 1893 and Denmark by 1896.

In 1882 the cow 'Khedive's Primrose' was sold to America for the incredible sum of £1,000, which in those days would have been sufficient to purchase an average size farm, house and buildings.

The importance of the cattle export industry to the Island can be illustrated when, in the three years from 1830, some 5,756 head of livestock were exported. Over a hundred years later, in 1948, as trade resumed following the end of World War II, some 2,041 animals were exported from the Island which, at that time, had a population of 8,973 head of cattle with 2,404 heifer calves being registered in that year.

As importing countries have developed their own national herds to suit their particular conditions the export of cattle has declined in recent years, however, top bloodlines from the Island herd are still exported mainly in the form of frozen bull semen.

=== The Jersey Cow Around the World ===
The qualities of the 'Jersey' breed have been much prized by dairy farmers all over the world and the 'Jersey' can now be found grazing fields in over 100 countries. The adaptability of the 'Jersey' to a variety of different environments ensures that the breed will thrive in climates where other dairy breeds struggle. Major populations of 'Jersey' cattle can be found in the USA, Canada, New Zealand, Australia, South Africa, Denmark and Latin America.

With an estimated worldwide population in excess of 2 million head, the 'Jersey' is now the second most numerous breed of dairy cow and an important influence in the global dairy industry.

Most countries with a significant number of 'Jersey' cattle have founded a breed association to manage and promote the breed in their respective countries. In 1949 the leading countries held a conference in this Island and in 1951 formed the World Jersey Cattle Bureau as an umbrella organisation for the breed around the world.

The World Jersey Cattle Bureau has its office in the RJA&HS headquarters building.

=== The Jersey Herd Book ===
The Jersey Herd Book is a register in which is recorded information relating to the bovine population, including the owner, a description of the animal, its ancestry, date of birth and many other facts. The Jersey Herd Book was formed on the 4 April 1866 and the ancestry of all pedigree 'Jerseys' in the world can be traced back to the Herd Book maintained on the Island.

The first animal registered in the Herd Book was a bull named 'Dandy', owned by Mr James Godfray of St. Martin, and the first cow registered was named 'Daisy', belonging to Mr. P. Paisnel of St. Clement.

In addition to holding pedigree details the Herd Book also records an animal's production and conformation, which is very important for assessing the breeding value of individuals so that the farmers can improve their stock, and therefore, the general condition of the cattle population.

Every animal is appraised visually and scored against a scale of points to describe its physical conformation, known as 'Herd Book Exams'.

Initially production performance was measured by milk testing at shows during the 1860s, with 24-hour butter tests starting in 1893. These were replaced in 1912 by a system of recording the weight of milk yielded by the individual cattle, which was the forerunner of the system of milk recording carried out to this day.
