= Witches' stones =

Chimneystack design

Witches' stones (in Jèrriais: pièrres dé chorchièrs) are flat stones jutting from chimneys in the islands of Jersey and Guernsey. Traditional vernacular architecture in Jersey is in granite and such witches' stones can be seen protruding from many older houses.

According to folklores in the Channel Islands, these small ledges were used by witches to rest on as they fly to their sabbats. Householders would provide these platforms to appease witches and avoid their ill favours.

The true origin of this architectural feature is to protect thatched roofs from seeping water running down the sides of the chimney stack. Thatched roofs being thicker than tiled roofs, the jutting stones would sit snugly on the thatch – as can be seen on the few remaining thatched roofs in Jersey. When thatch began to be generally replaced by pantiles in the 18th century, and later by slates, the witches' stones were left protruding prominently from the chimney stack. This either gave rise to the belief in witches' resting places, or reinforced an existing belief. Fear of witches was widespread in country areas well into the 20th century in Jersey.

The force of tradition can be seen in a number of newly constructed houses in vernacular style that sport witches' stones despite never having had a thatched roof.

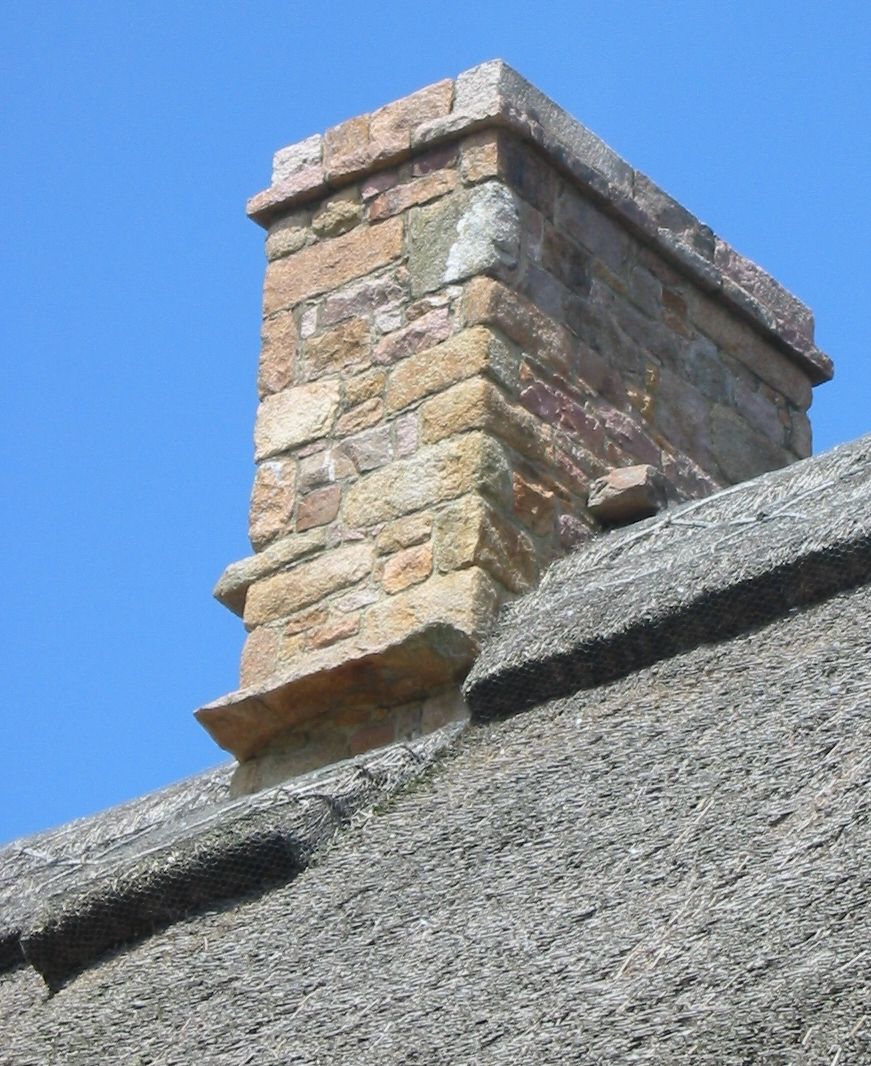
The stones protect the joins of thatched roofs

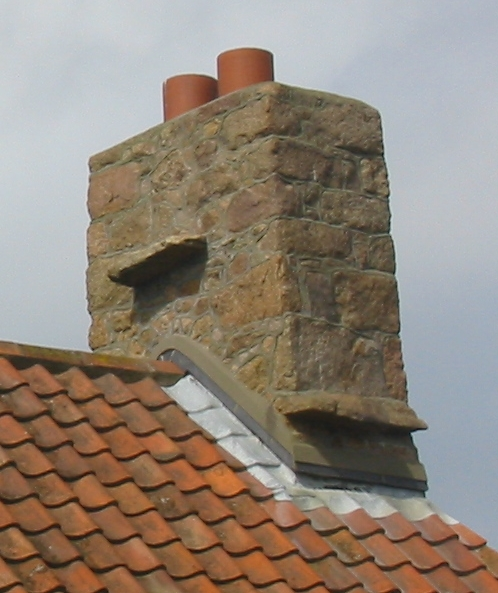
When thatch is replaced by tile, the stones no longer serve the original purpose

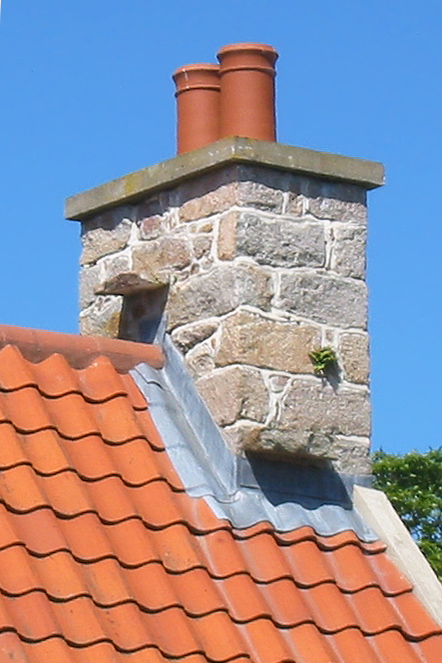

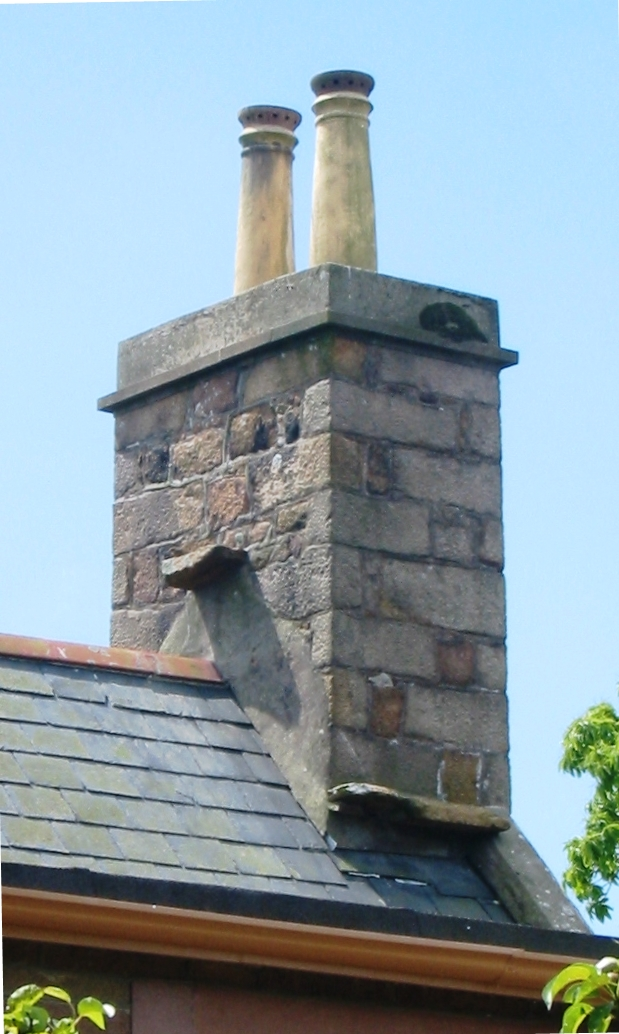

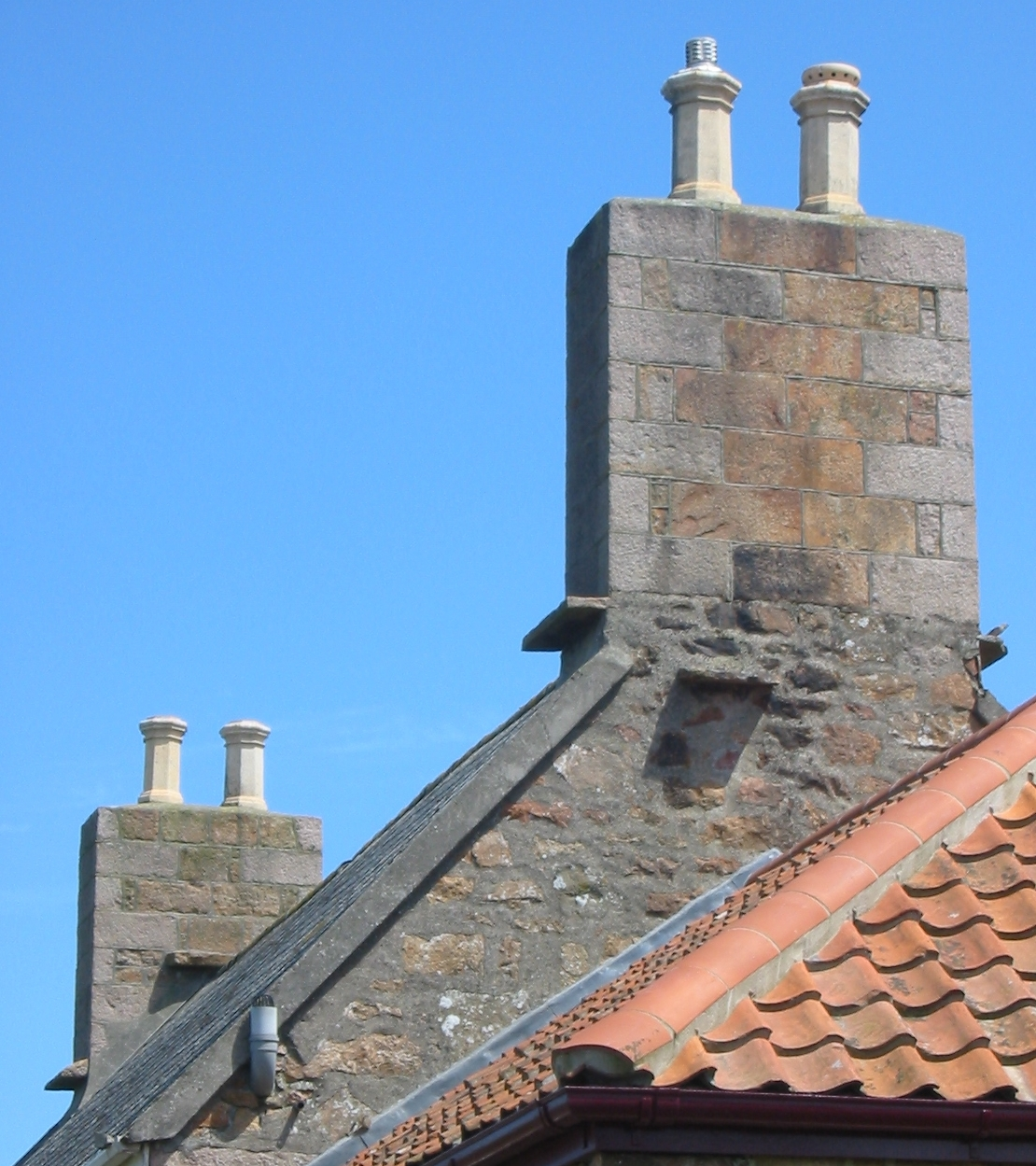

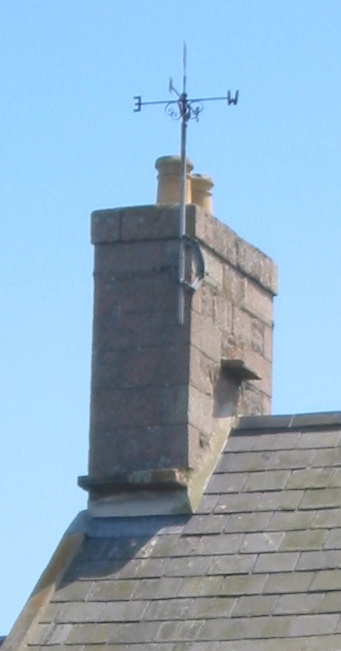

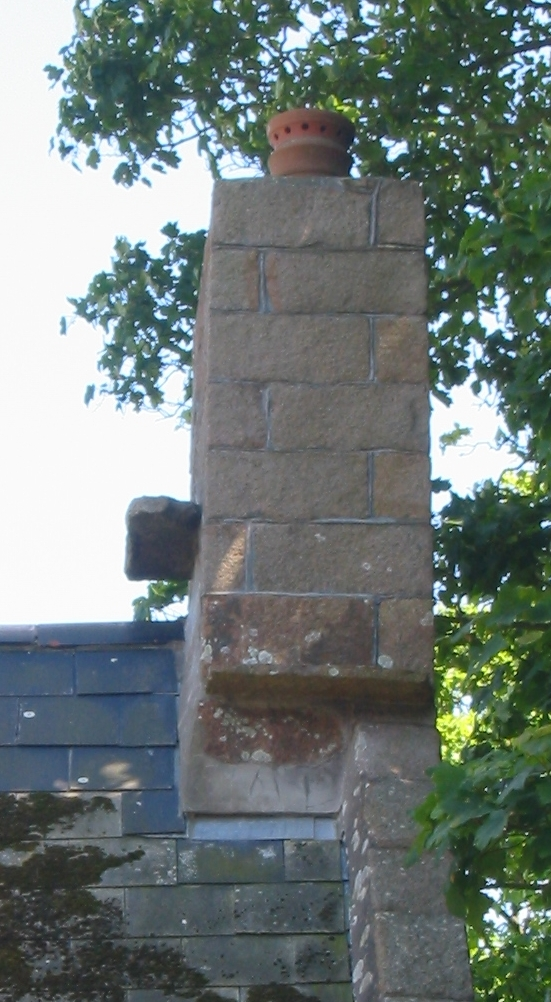

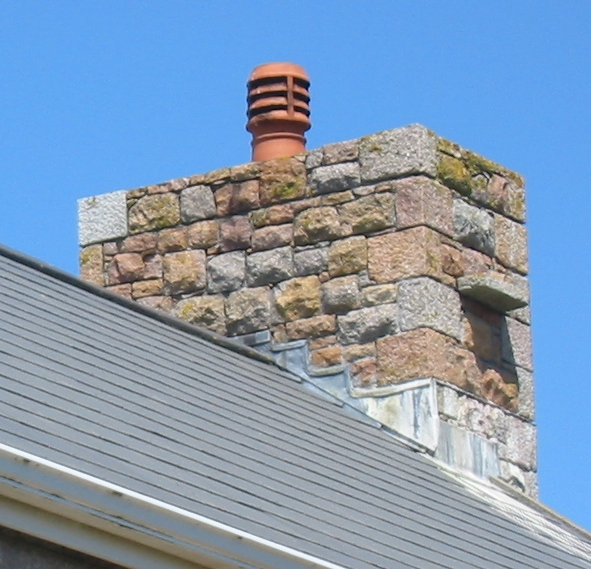
This modern house incorporates witches' stones in its chimneys

== In England ==
Although not common in England, witch stones or witch seats can be found in the villages of Feizor, near Settle, and at Wharfe both in North Yorkshire.

== See also ==
- Architecture of Normandy
- Adder stones, which are also called witches' stones
