= Jersey Royal =

Marketing name of a type of potato grown in Jersey

Potato 'Jersey Royals'
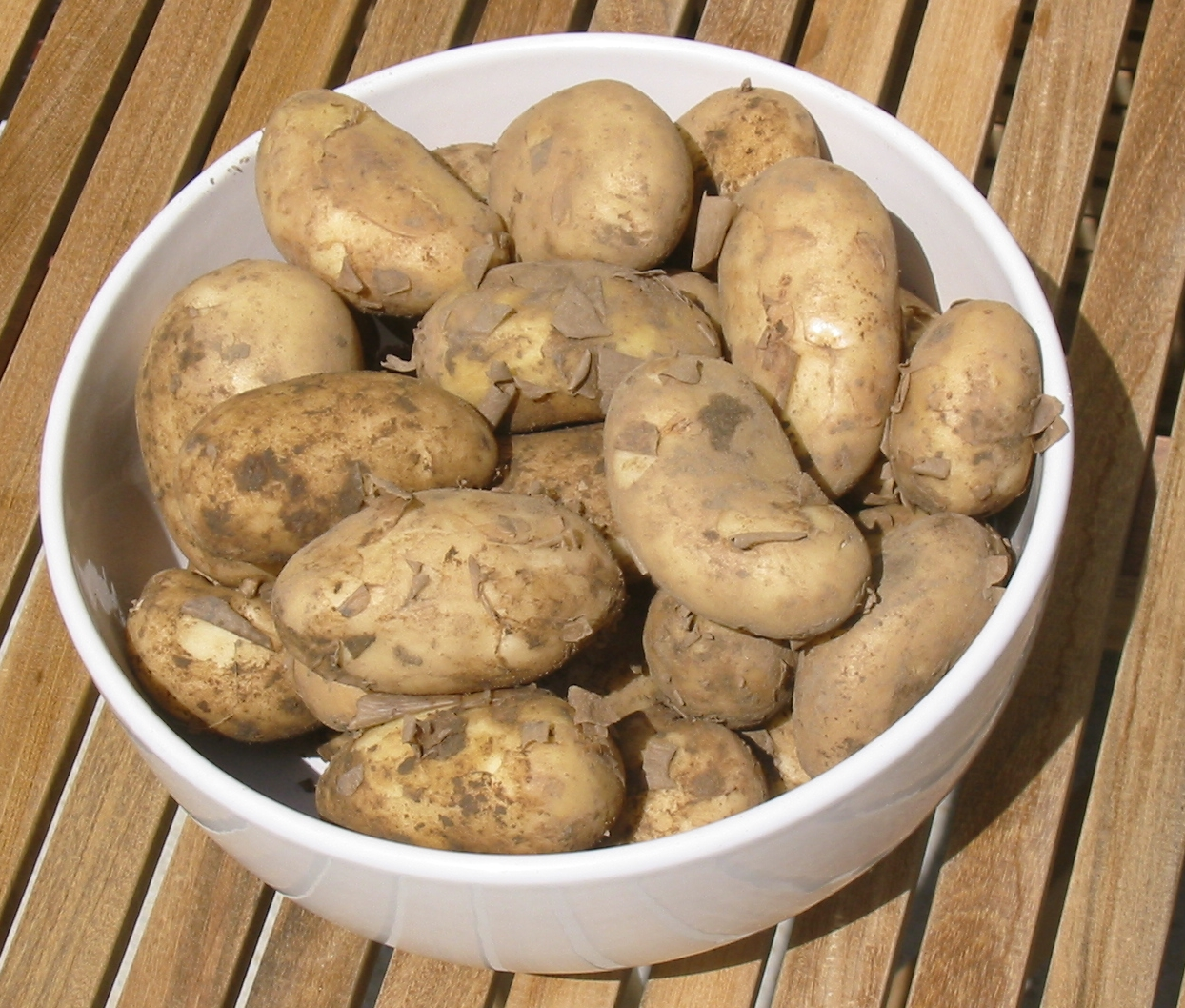
- 'Jersey Royals', raw
- Genus: Solanum
- Species: Solanum tuberosum
- Variety: International Kidney
- Cultivar: 'Jersey Royal'
- Origin: Jersey

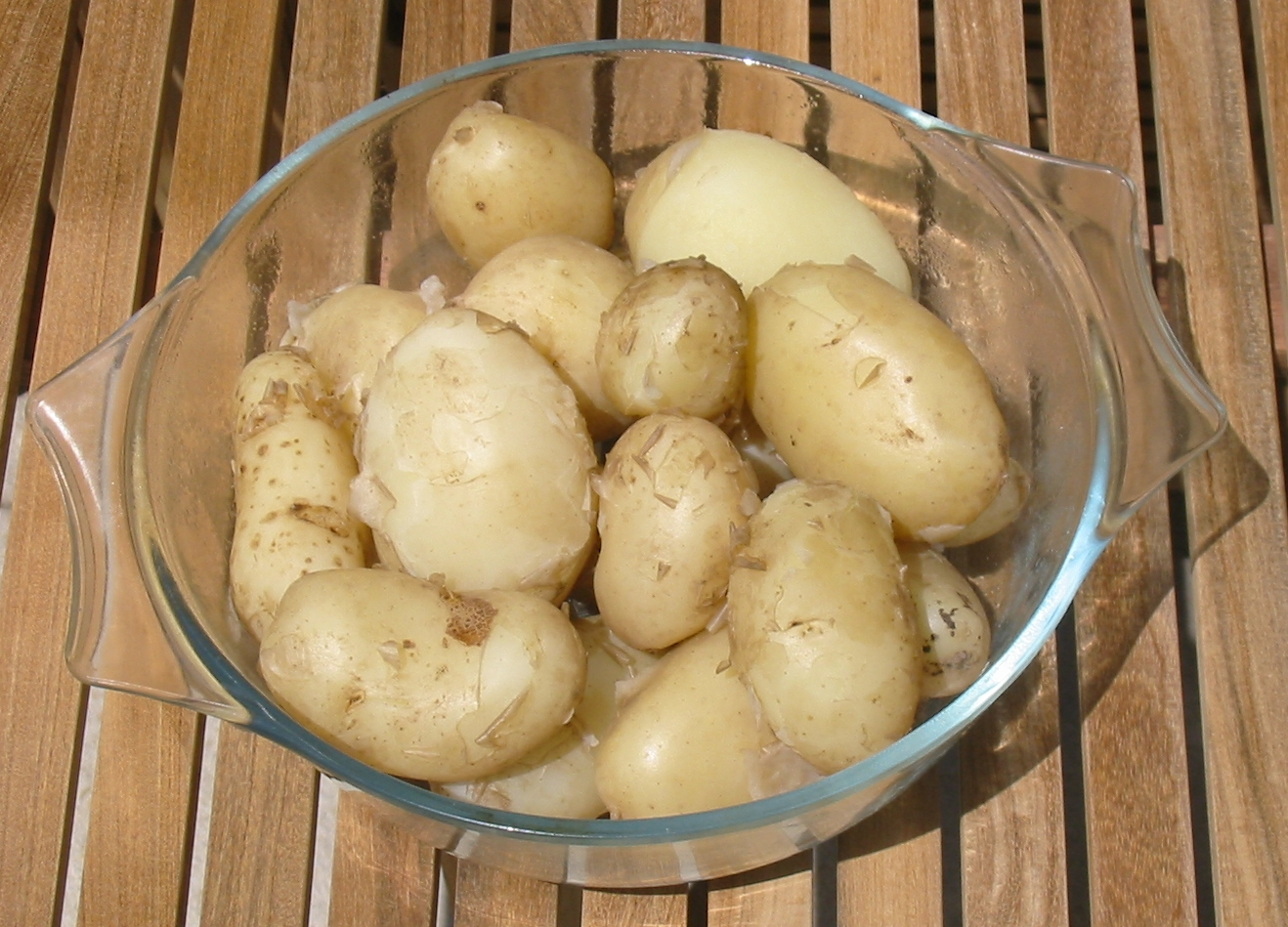
'Jersey Royals', boiled

The Jersey Royal is the marketing name of a type of potato grown in Jersey which has a Protected Designation of Origin. The potatoes are of the variety known as International Kidney and are typically grown as a new potato.

== History ==
Around 1878 a Jersey farmer, Hugh de la Haye, showed friends a large potato that he had bought. It had 15 'eyes': points from which new plants sprout. They cut this potato into pieces, which they planted in a côtil (a steeply sloping field) above the Bellozanne valley. One plant produced kidney-shaped potatoes, with a paper-thin skin, which they called the Jersey Royal Fluke. This was later shortened to 'Jersey Royal'.

== Present day ==
In modern times the Jersey Royal is Jersey's biggest crop export, accounting for around 70 per cent of agricultural turnover. Ninety-nine per cent of production is exported to the United Kingdom.

In 2012 Jersey exported 28,600 tonnes of it, worth £28.6 million. This figure was down from 30,890 tonnes in 2011.

Under the Common Agricultural Policy of the European Union Jersey Royals are covered by a Protected Designation of Origin.
