= St Brelade =

Parish in south-western Jersey

Coordinates: 49.19696°N 2.19658°W

Saint Brelade Saint Brélade
- Parish
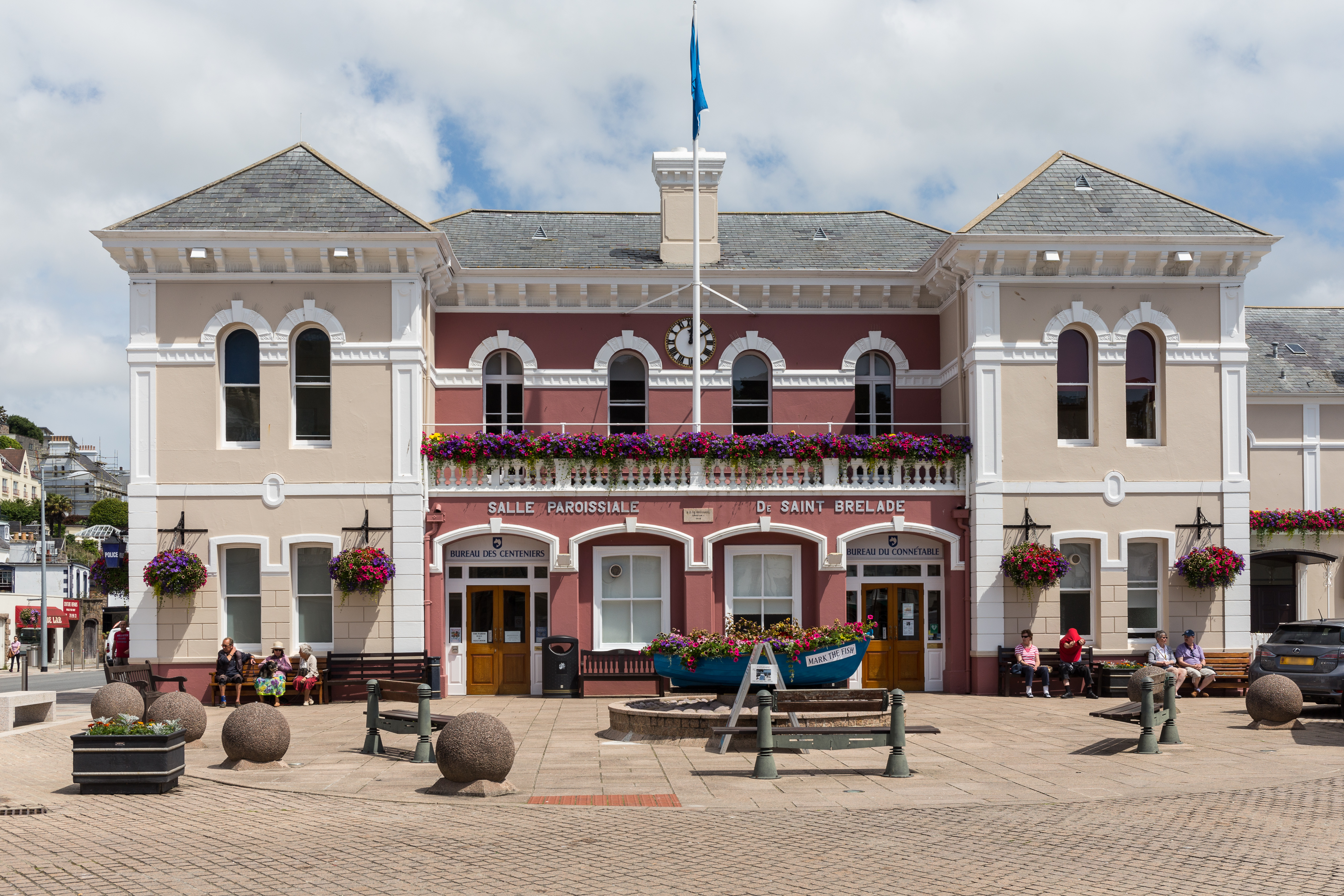
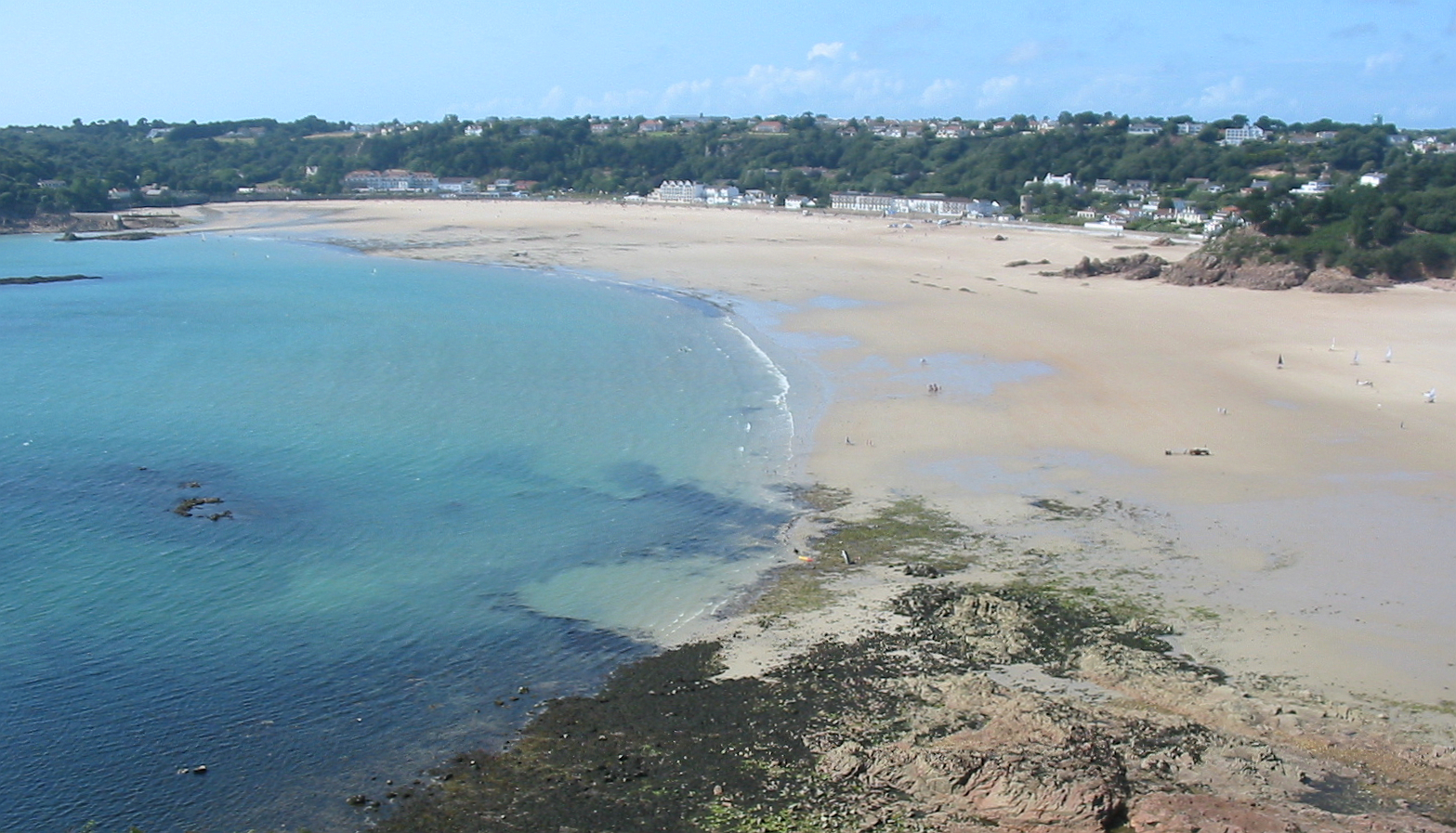
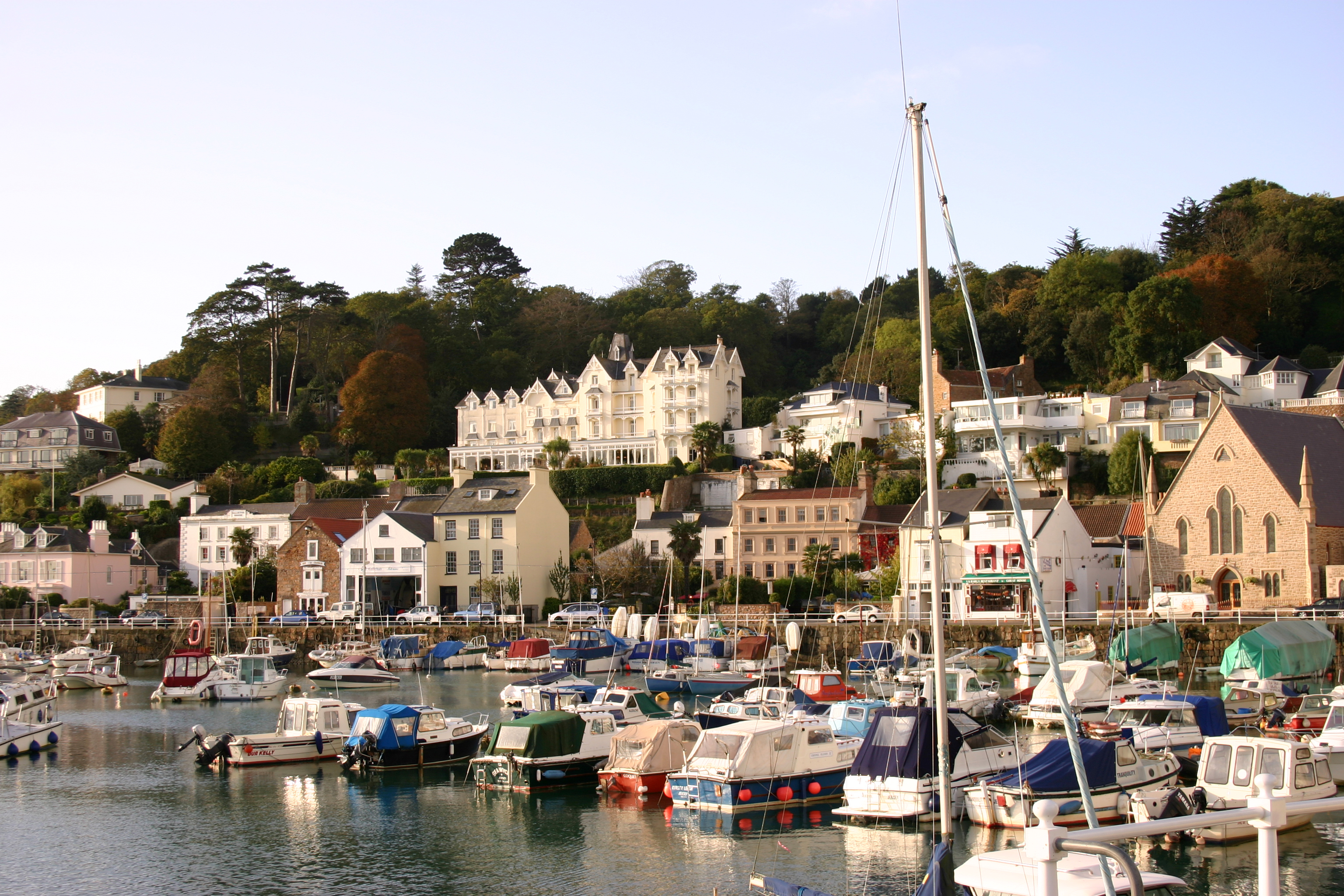
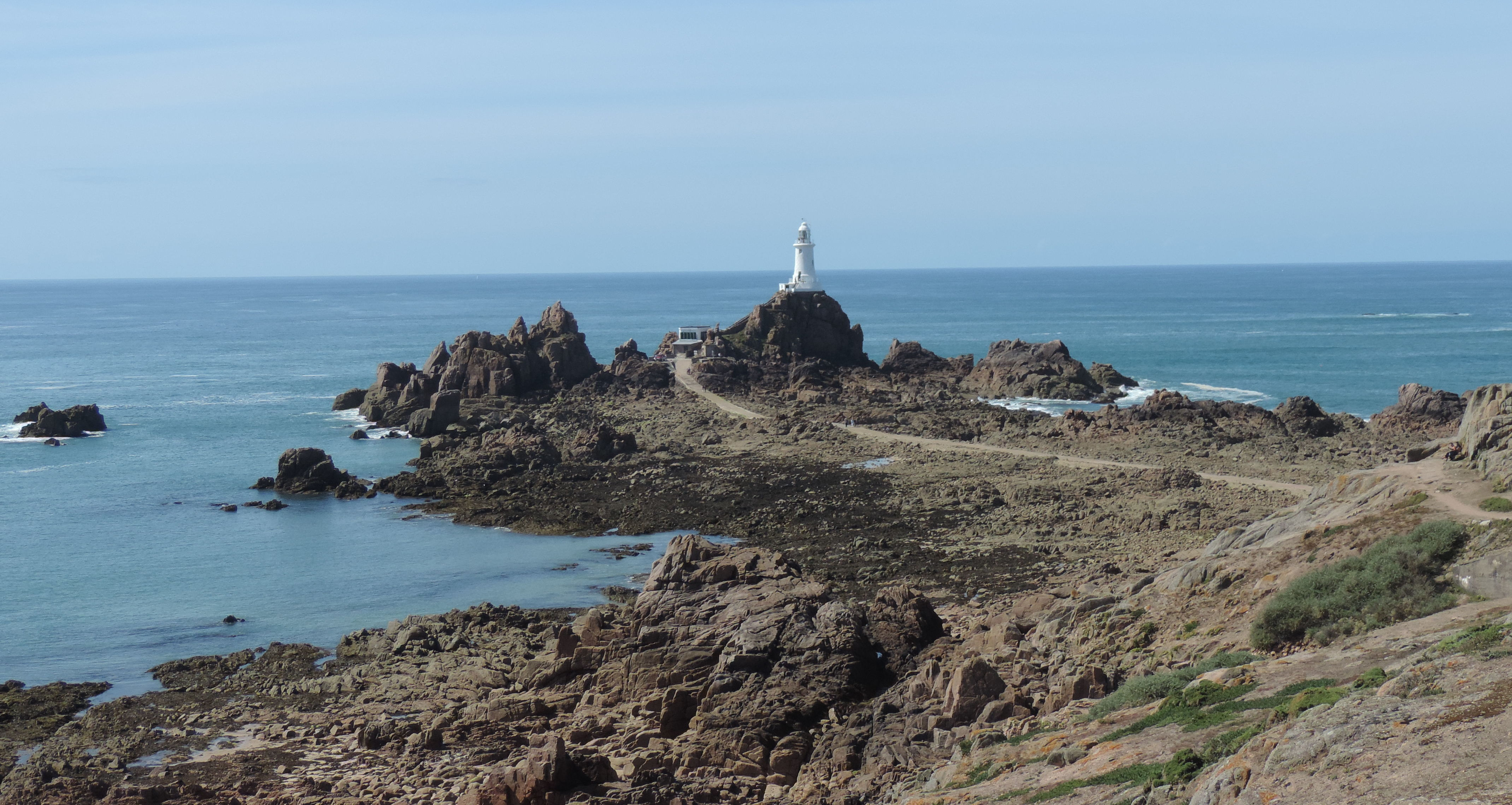
- Parish Hall St Brelade's Bay St Aubin La Corbière

- Flag Coat of arms

- Location of Saint Brelade in Jersey
- Crown Dependency: Jersey, Channel Islands

Government
  - Connétable: Michael Jackson

Area
  - Total: 12.8 km^{2} (4.9 sq mi)
  - Rank: Ranked second

Population (2021)
  - Total: 11,012
  - Density: 860/km^{2} (2,230/sq mi)
- Time zone: GMT
  - Summer (DST): UTC+01
- Postcode district: JE3
- Postcode sector: 8
- Website: www.parish.gov.je/st_brelade/

St Brelade (Jèrriais and French: Saint Brélade) is one of the twelve parishes of Jersey, in the Channel Islands. It is around 7 km (4.3 mi) (Note: Measured from the church to the Royal Square.) west of St Helier. Its population was 11,012 as of 2021. The parish's main settlement is St Aubin.

The parish is the second-largest parish by surface area, covering 7,103 vergées (12.78km^{2}), which is 11% of the total land surface of the island. It is the only parish to border only one other, St Peter.

The parish is largely a suburban commuter area for St Helier, with expansive low rise residential development, especially in the urban area of Les Quennevais. However, the parish also has a number of notable natural sites, such as the sand dunes of St Ouen's Bay.

== History ==
Its name is derived from a sixth-century Celtic or Welsh "wandering saint" named Branwalator or St. Brelade (also Branwallder, Broladre, Brelodre, Brélade), who is said to have been the son of the Cornish king, Kenen. He is also said to have been a disciple of Samson of Dol, and worked with this churchman in Cornwall and the Channel Islands.

The town of St. Aubin is named after Albinus of Angers, Bishop of Angers, in France.

The Jersey parish system has been in place for centuries. By Norman times, the parish boundaries were firmly fixed and remain largely unchanged since.

In 1180, Jersey was divided by the Normans into three ministeria for administrative purposes. St. Brelade was part of Crapoudoit; this likely refers to the stream running through St. Peter's Valley.

Towards the end of the 18th century, after the Battle of Jersey, trade with the New World grew, as did the island's shipbuilding industry. In 1683, the Constable of St. Brelade fined four men living near St Aubin for cluttering up the road from their houses to Le Boulevard.

A large section of the Jersey Railway, linking La Corbière, St Aubin and St Helier, ran through the parish between 1870 and 1936.

== Governance ==
The parish is a first-level administrative division of the Bailiwick of Jersey, a British Crown dependency. The highest official in the parish is the Connétable of St Brelade. The incumbent office holder is Michael Jackson, who has held the office since 2005. The parish administration is headquartered in St Aubin.

At present, the parish forms two electoral districts for States Assembly elections and elects three deputies, as well as eight senators in an island-wide constituency. The current deputies for St Brelade are listed below. Under the proposed electoral reform, St Brelade will form a single constituency, electing four representatives alongside its Connétable.

Electoral districts and vingtaines of St. Brelade
| District | Vingtaines | Deputy/ies |
|---|---|---|
| 1 | La Vingtaine de Noirmont; La Vingtaine du Coin | John Young |
| 2 | La Vingtaine des Quennevais; La Vingtaine de la Moye | Monty Tadier; Graham Truscott |

== Geography ==
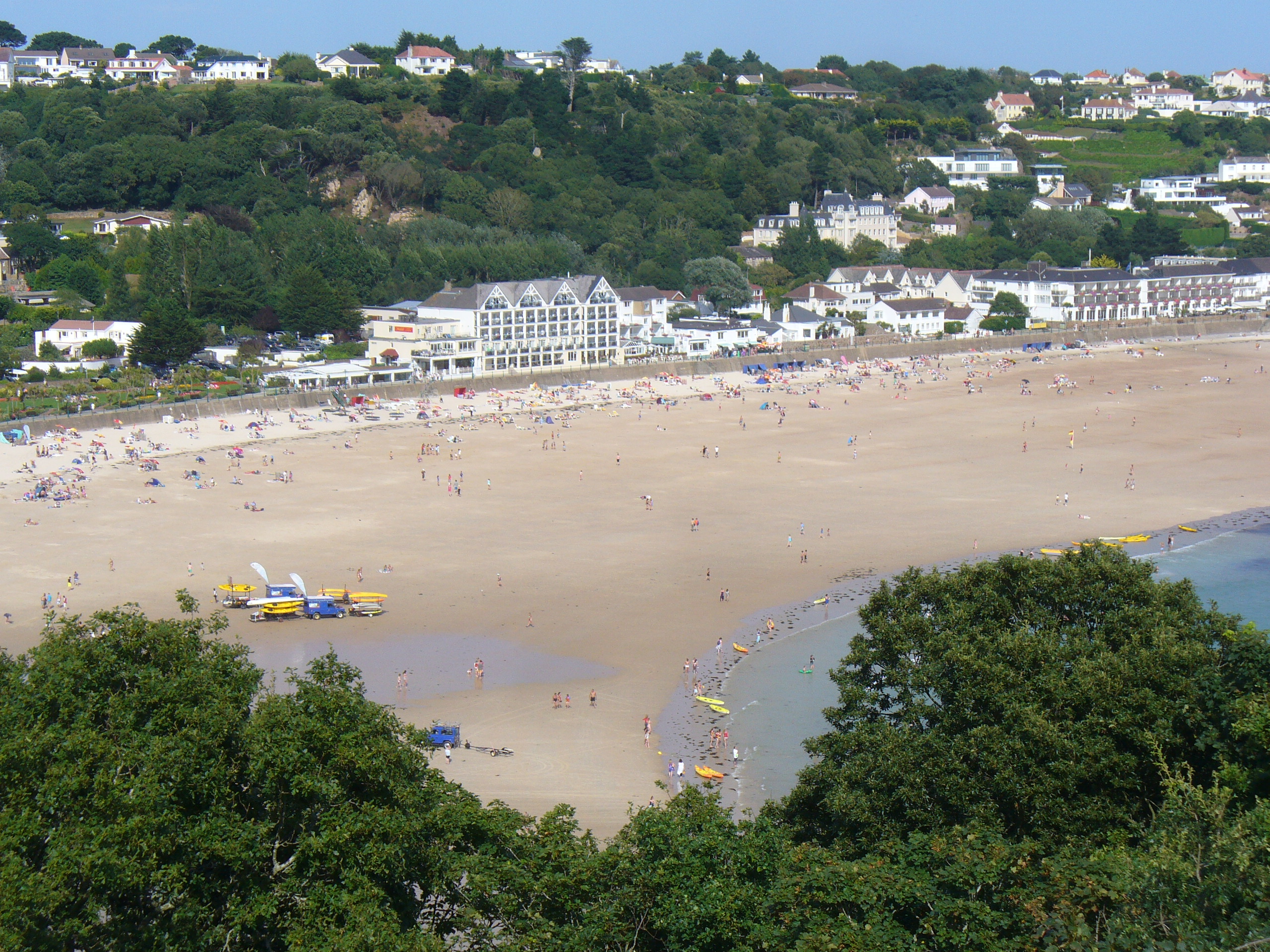
An overview of Saint Brélade's Bay on a hot summer day at low tide

St. Brelade is in the south-west of the island of Jersey, part of the Channel Islands archipelago. It is the only parish to border only one other, St Peter. It is located 4.7 km (2.9 mi) west of St Helier. The parish has a number of popular bays, St Brelade's Bay, Ouaisné, Portelet and parts of both St Ouen's Bay and St Aubin's Bay falling within the parish boundaries.

The parish is quite urbanised, with 29% of the land area being built environment. It is also the least agricultural, with only 24% of the parish dedicated to cultivation. However, 38% is dedicated to the natural environment, as the parish has notable natural coastal areas.

The parish's population is largely centred around three primary areas of development. The largest is the Les Quennevais built-up area, developed largely in incorporating St Brelade's Bay. This area has several shops, a leisure centre and a secondary school. The other areas are the developments around Noirmont and Mont Nicolle, and St Aubin, the historic centre of the parish; it was originally a fishing port facing St Helier on the opposite side of St Aubin's Bay.

Portelet Bay is found in the parish to the west of Noirmont headland, between St Brelade and St Aubin's Bay. It features an islet named Île au Guerdain (named for a local family) on which stands a Martello tower. In the 1920s, one of the first holiday camps on Jersey opened overlooking the bay, at one point owned by Billy Butlin, although the camp closed in 2000. The bay featured a controversy around 2010, with planning permission granted for a number of homes overlooking the bay.

=== Demography ===
Historical population
| Year | Pop. | ±% |
|---|---|---|
| 1991 | 9,331 | — |
| 1996 | 9,560 | +2.5% |
| 2001 | 10,134 | +6.0% |
| 2011 | 10,568 | +4.3% |

== Landmarks ==
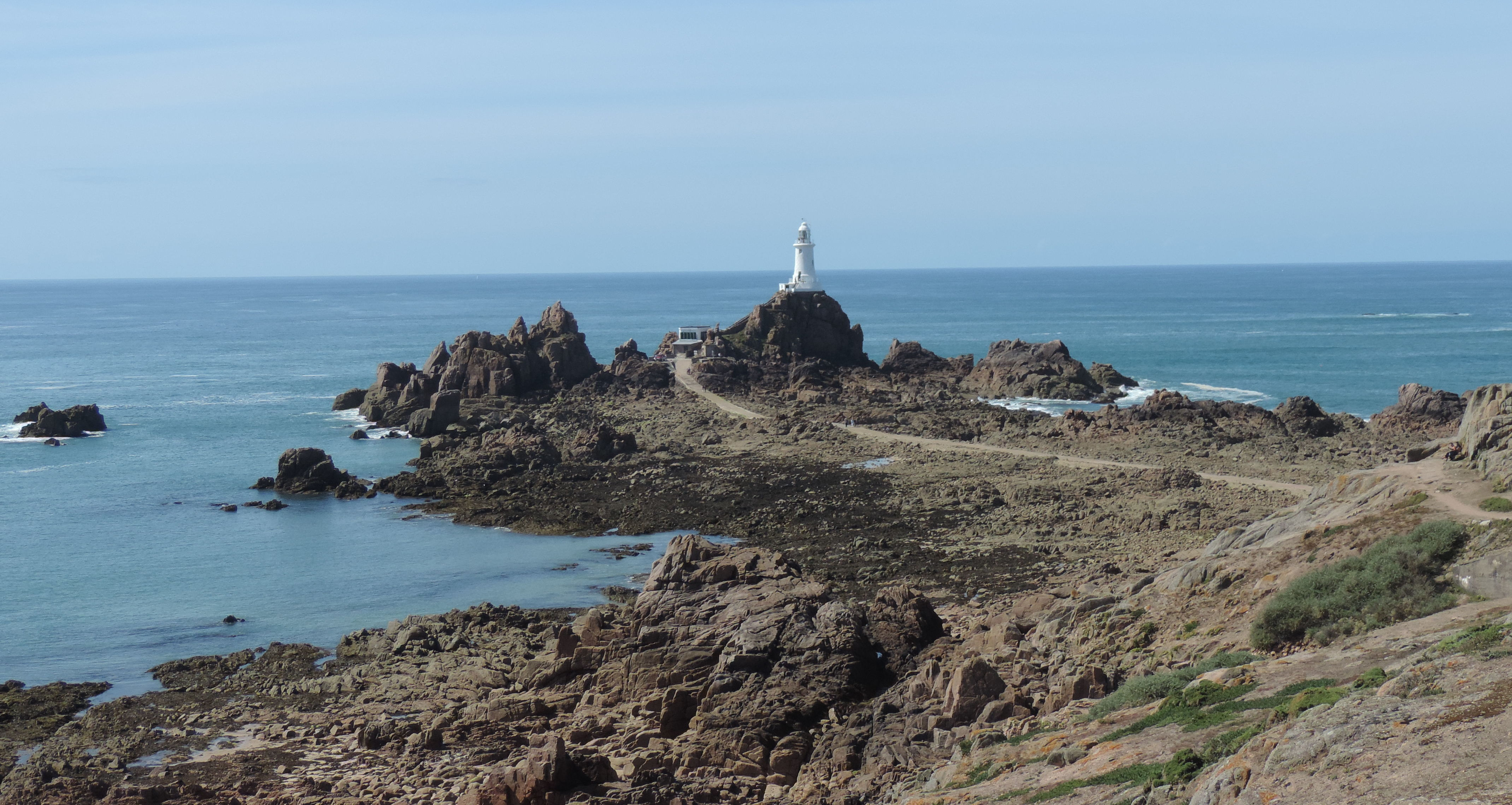
Corbière Lighthouse

The lighthouse at La Corbière features on the Jersey £5 note and the Jersey 20-pence piece. La Corbière means the place of ravens or crows. This corner of the island had a fearsome reputation amongst sailors and was the scene of many wrecks. The lighthouse was designed by Sir John Coode and constructed in 1873. A causeway connects the lighthouse to the mainland, but is cut off for large parts of the day.

Jersey's prison is situated at La Moye and the island's desalination plant is also sited in the parish.

St Aubin's Fort is located on an islet in St Aubin's Bay. It was built at the command of Sir Henry Cornish in 1542. It became a fort in 1643, during the English Civil War. The islet was refortified during the German occupation of the Channel Islands. Today, St Aubin’s Fort is run by Jersey Youth Service as a centre for outdoor learning.

== Religious sites ==
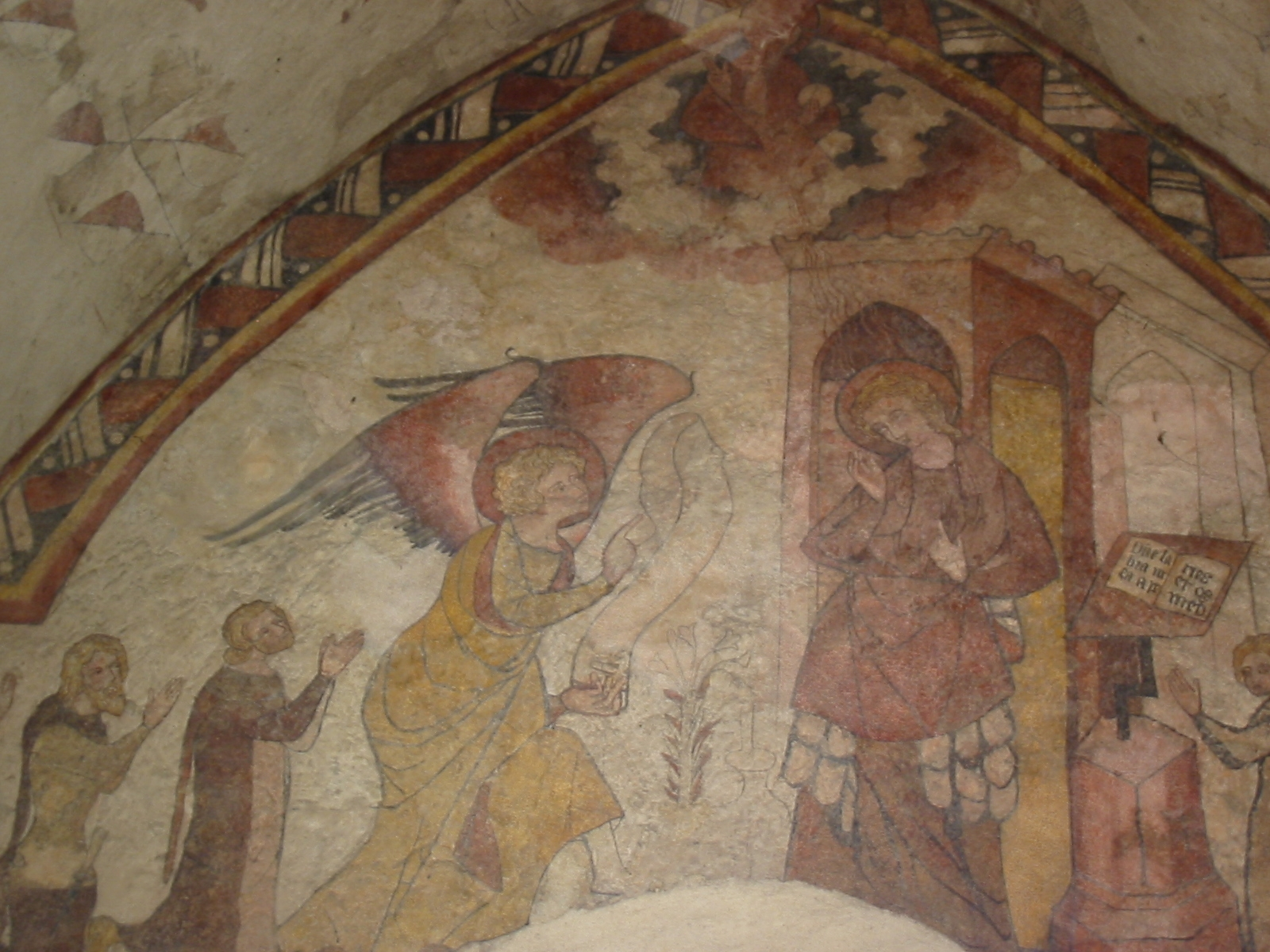
La Chapelle ès Pêcheurs, situated alongside St. Brélade's parish church, contains the best-preserved examples of mediaeval art in Jersey

St. Brelade's Church is situated at the end of St Brelade's Bay, an unusual situation being comparatively distant from historic centres of population. The small Fisherman's Chapel alongside contains mediaeval frescoes which survived the iconoclasm of the Reformation. According to folklore, the reason for the siting of the parish church is that originally the St Bréladais intended to build the church inland, much nearer to the homes of the congregation. However, les p'tits faîtchieaux (the little people) who had their temple in a nearby dolmen were disturbed by the construction of the foundations and, every night, would undo the construction work and magically transport all the tools and materials down to the shoreline. Eventually, the humans gave up and built the church where the fairies had indicated.

Another church is located close to the parish hall in St Aubin. St Aubin on the Hill is an Anglican church in the Parish of St Brelade, dedicated to St Aubin of Angers. The church that stands today was built in the 19th century and is a fine example of Victorian Gothic style, with beautiful stained glass windows. When this was built, the appointed minister of the Anglican church also supported the building of a local primary school just a short walk from the church. St. Brelade's School served the whole parish until it closed in 1984 and became St. Brelade's College, a school that teaches English to foreign pupils.

== Transport ==
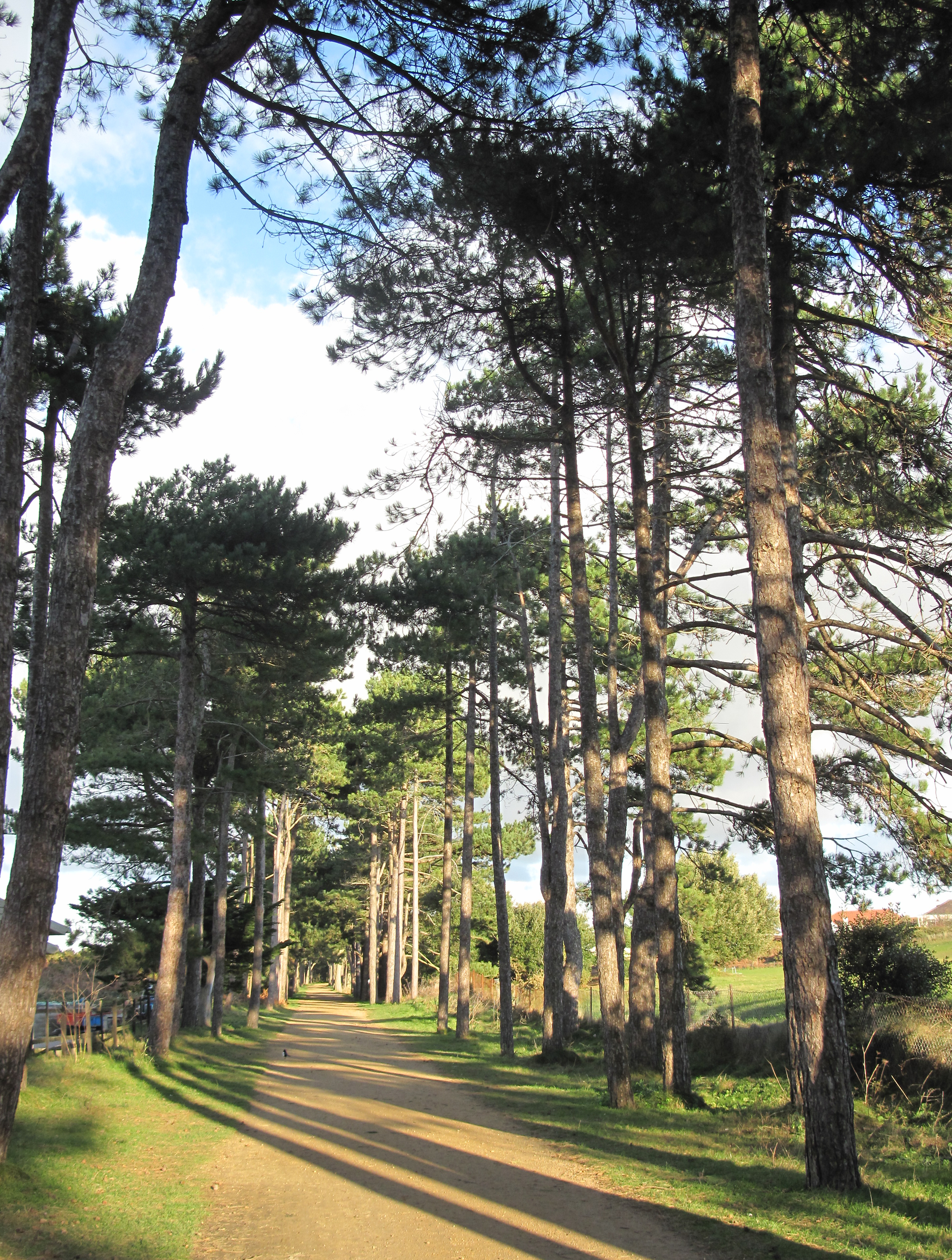
The Railway Walk

There are several main roads in the parish, including the western terminus of the A1 and the Five Mile Road.

Public transport is provided by five bus routes, operated by LibertyBus:

- 12: St Helier - St Aubin - Jersey Airport
- 12A: St Helier - St Aubin - La Corbière
- 14: St Helier - St Aubin - St Brelade's Bay
- 15: St Helier - St Aubin - Jersey Airport
- 22: St Helier - Jersey Airport - La Corbière - L'Etacq.

The parish was formerly served by the Jersey Railway, which connected Corbière to St Aubin, then on to St Helier along the coast. The line was closed in 1936 after a fire at St Aubin station. The Germans relaid the track during the German occupation of the Channel Islands.

The old railway trackbed has been converted into a rail trail, known as the Railway Walk. As part of the Sustainable Transport Policy, a toucan crossing has been installed at the junction of the walk with La Rue du Pont Marquet, which is an accident black spot.

== Culture and community ==
The traditional nickname for St. Bréladaises (inhabitants of St. Brelade) is carpéleuses (caterpillars). The emblem or symbol of the parish is a fish, legendarily linked to the saint himself, and though the type of fish has been debated, a 2010 redesign, based on heraldic research, depicted it as a cod.

In 2009, the parish won a Britain in Bloom award in the small coastal resort category; it won further awards in 2012, 2014 and 2015.

The parish has a number of community facilities. The Sir Winston Churchill Memorial Park is located in St Brelade's Bay and the Elephant Park is located near the Les Quennevais Precinct. There is a branch of the Jersey Library called the Les Quennevais Branch Library; it was formerly located within Les Quennevais school until that site was moved in 2020. It is now located in the Communicare Centre.

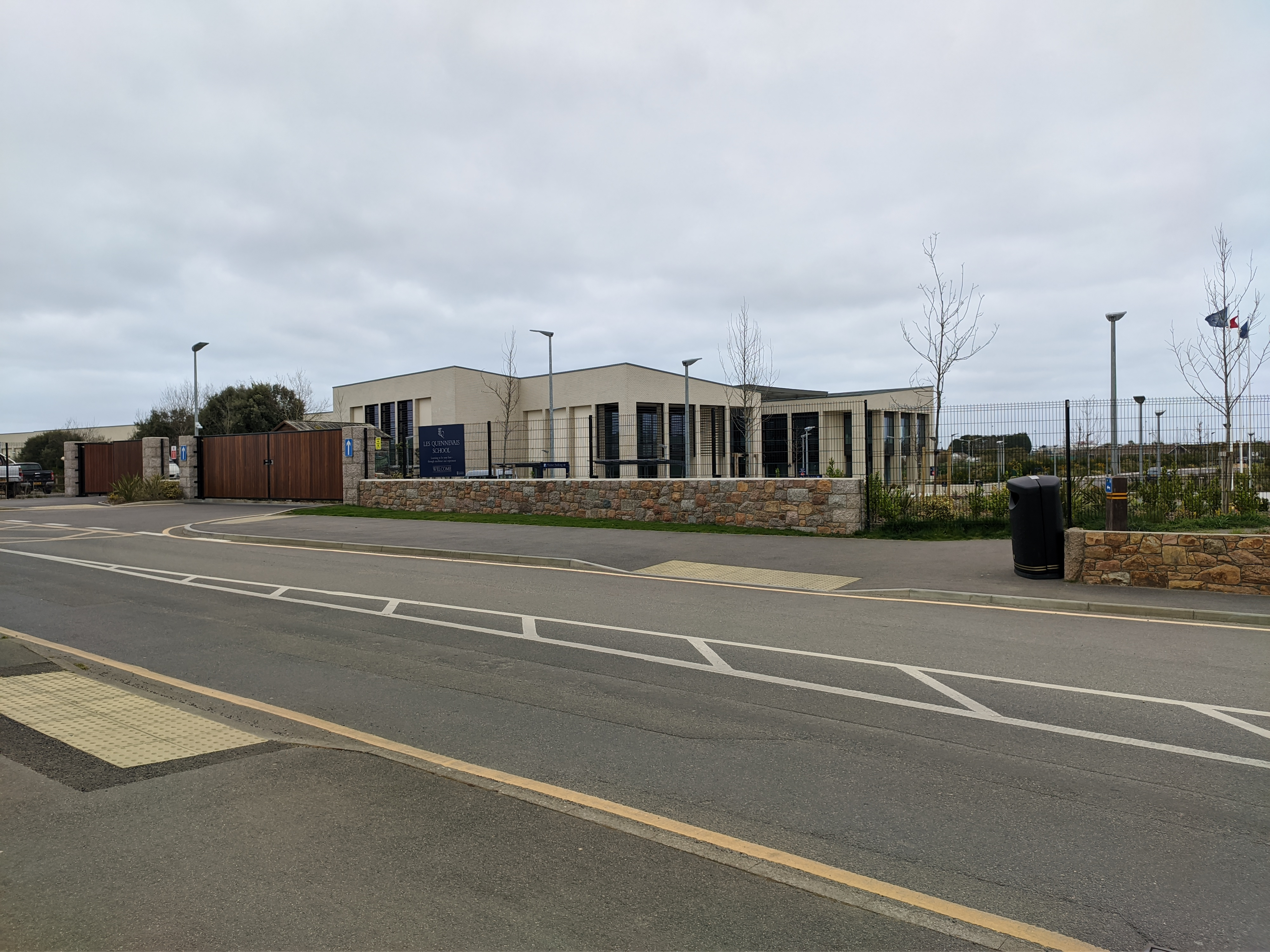
The new large and modern Les Quennevais school, opened in 2020

Les Quennevais leisure centre in St Brelade will be redeveloped in two phases as part of the Government's Inspiring Active Places Strategy. First will be to provision of a new skate park and a four court netball facility, as well as a 3G football pitch. The Jersey indoor netball facility is current at Les Ormes (also in St. Brelade), which is being closed and redeveloped by March 2023. The target date for this phase of development is 2024. By 2032, phase 2 will be complete; the existing sports centre buildings will be demolished and replaced with parking after the construction of a new leisure centre, incorporating an eight-lane 25-metre swimming pool, an eight-court sports hall, a permanent recreational gymnastics facility and a large fitness suite. The site will also be the new home of the Jersey Library Les Quennevais Branch.

== Notable people ==
- Isaac LeVesconte (12 August 1822 – 26 October 1879), Nova Scotia businessman and political figure
- Charles Robin
- Robert Pipon Marett, of La Haule Manor
- Claude Cahun
- André Gide
- Simon Laurens
- Derek Warwick, British former Formula One driver
- Ronald Price Hickman, car designer and inventor who designed the original Lotus Elan, the Lotus Elan +2 and the Lotus Europa, as well as the Black & Decker Workmate
- Sir Bob Murray, businessman and former chairman of Sunderland A.F.C.; an accountant by trade, he made his fortune through the growth and sale of the Spring Ram kitchen manufacturing company
- Jack Higgins, pseudonym of British novelist Harry Patterson, author of The Eagle Has Landed.

== Twin town ==
St Brelade is twinned with:

- (France) Granville, Normandy
