= Millbrook railway station =

Millbrook railway station may refer to:

- Millbrook railway station (Bedfordshire), in Bedfordshire, England
- Millbrook railway station (Hampshire), in Hampshire, England
- Millbrook railway station (Jersey), in the Bailiwick of Jersey
- Millbrook railway station, Victoria, in Victoria, Australia
