= St Aubin railway station =

Railway station in Saint Brelade, Jersey

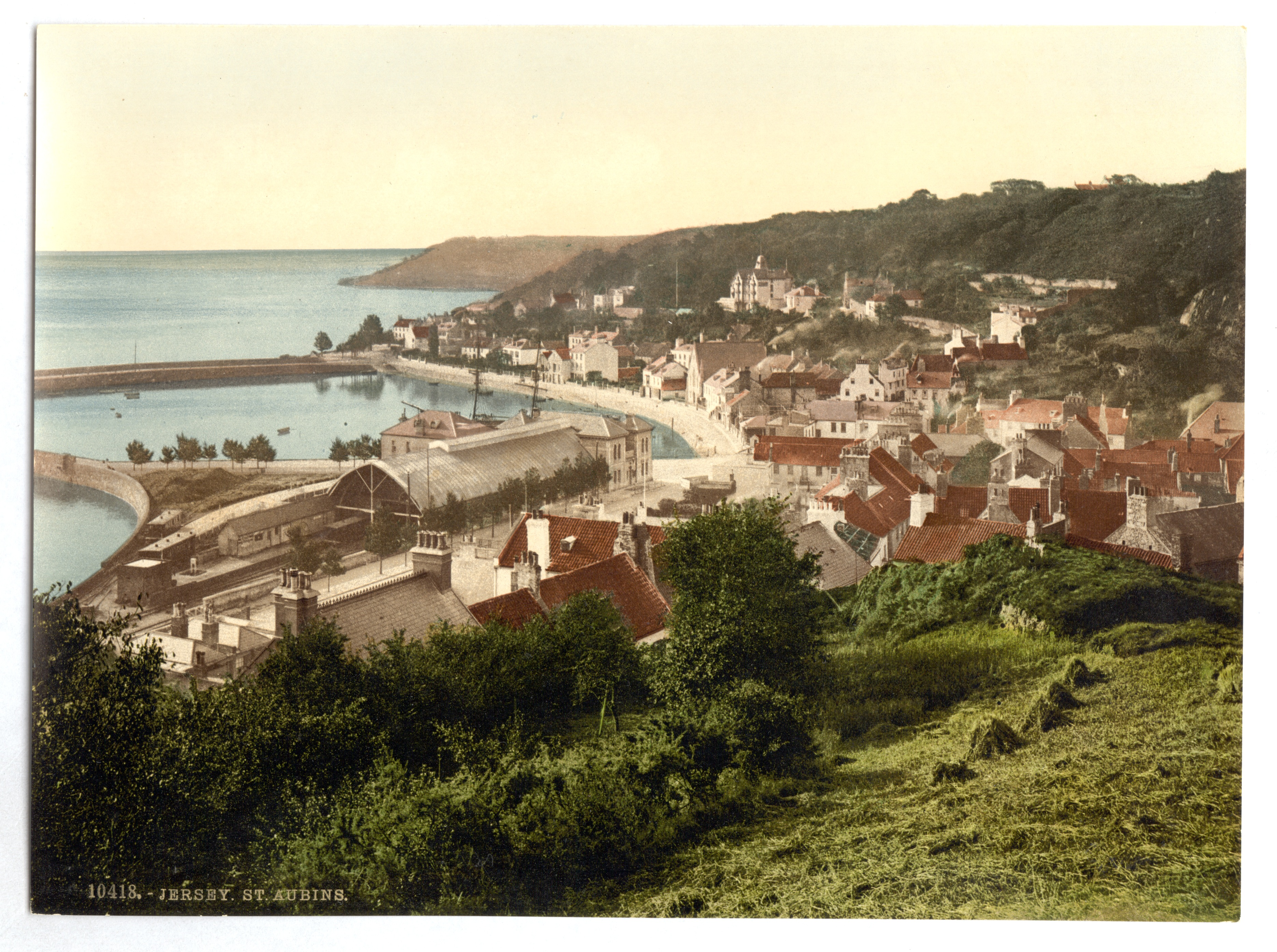
- A view of Saint Aubin and its station, c.1890s

General information
- Location: Saint Aubin, Saint Brélade, Jersey, Channel Islands
- Coordinates: 49.187775°N 2.169797°W
- Owner: Jersey Railway
- Lines: Western line between St Helier and Corbière
- Platforms: 3

Other information
- Status: Closed

History
- Opened: 25 October 1870
- Closed: 30 September 1936
Route map
Location
- Location within Jersey

St Aubin railway station, also known as St Aubins, served the town and port of St Aubin, in Jersey, Channel Islands. Opened in 1870 by the Jersey Railway, it was in passenger operation until the line closed in 1936.

== History ==
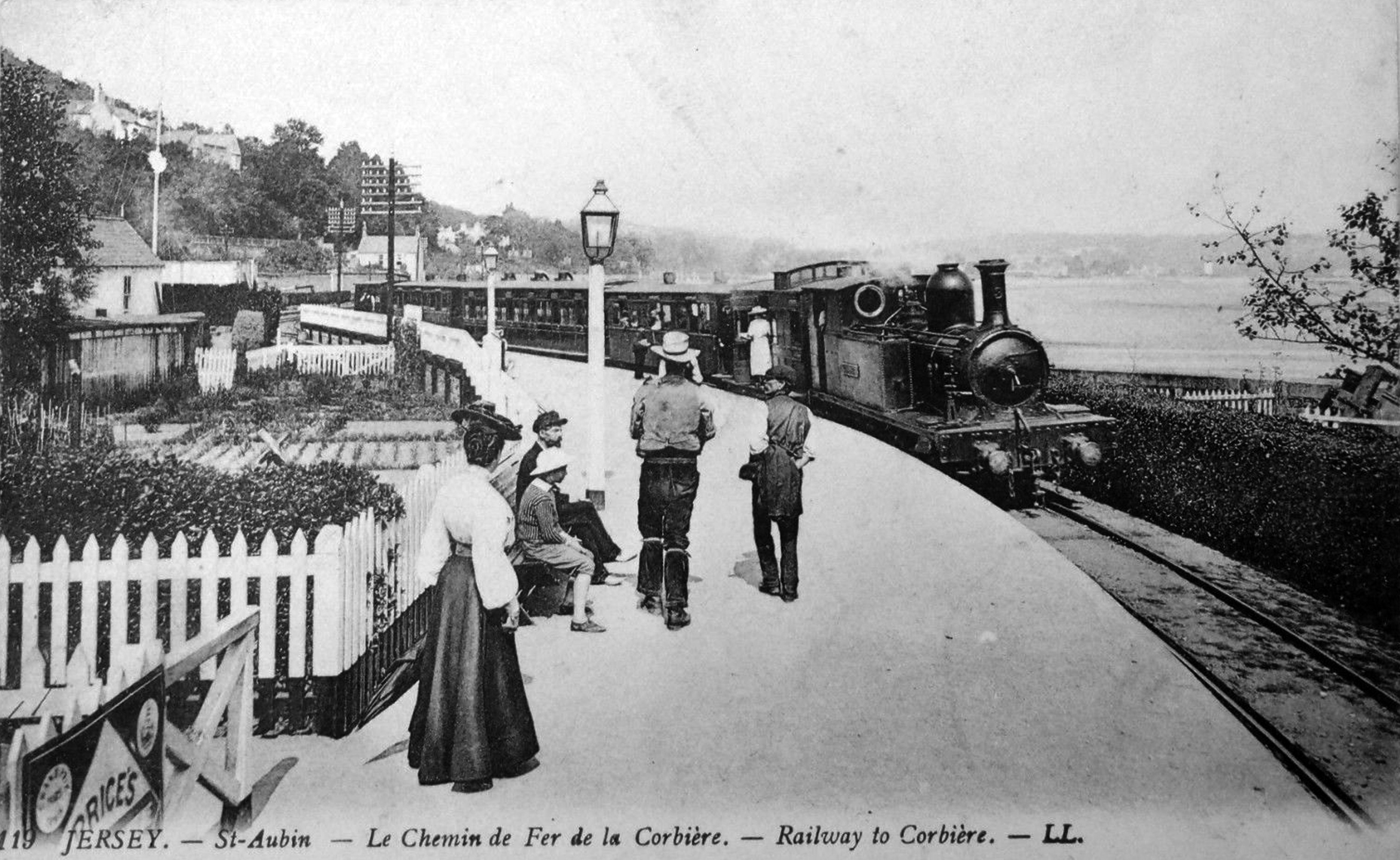
Postcard of a train at St Aubin station

The Jersey Railway first opened in 1870, running services between St Helier and St Aubin with trains stopping at the three intermediate stations: First Tower, Millbrook and Beaumont. The first trial service ran on 28 September; on the following day a train carrying 300 invited guests departed from St Helier. The line was formally opened to passengers on 17 October with a grand ceremonial opening, followed by a banquet at Noirmont Manor, the residence of the contractor, Mr E. Pickering. On the opening day, 4,000 single journeys were made on the line.

The station, as originally built, had two platforms under a train shed. A hotel opened at the station in 1871.

In 1884, an extension to Corbière was built using a temporary terminus, rather than St Aubin station, initially due to the need to blast a large amount of rock to allow the lines to join together. In 1885, the link was completed and a third platform was opened to serve trains on this extension.

In 1922, the train shed was demolished, due to its poor condition, and was replaced with canopies over the platforms.

== Closure ==
On 15 October 1936, a fire damaged the station and destroyed most of the railway's rolling stock. The company sold all of its land and stations to the States of Jersey for £25,000 in 1937.

== The site today ==
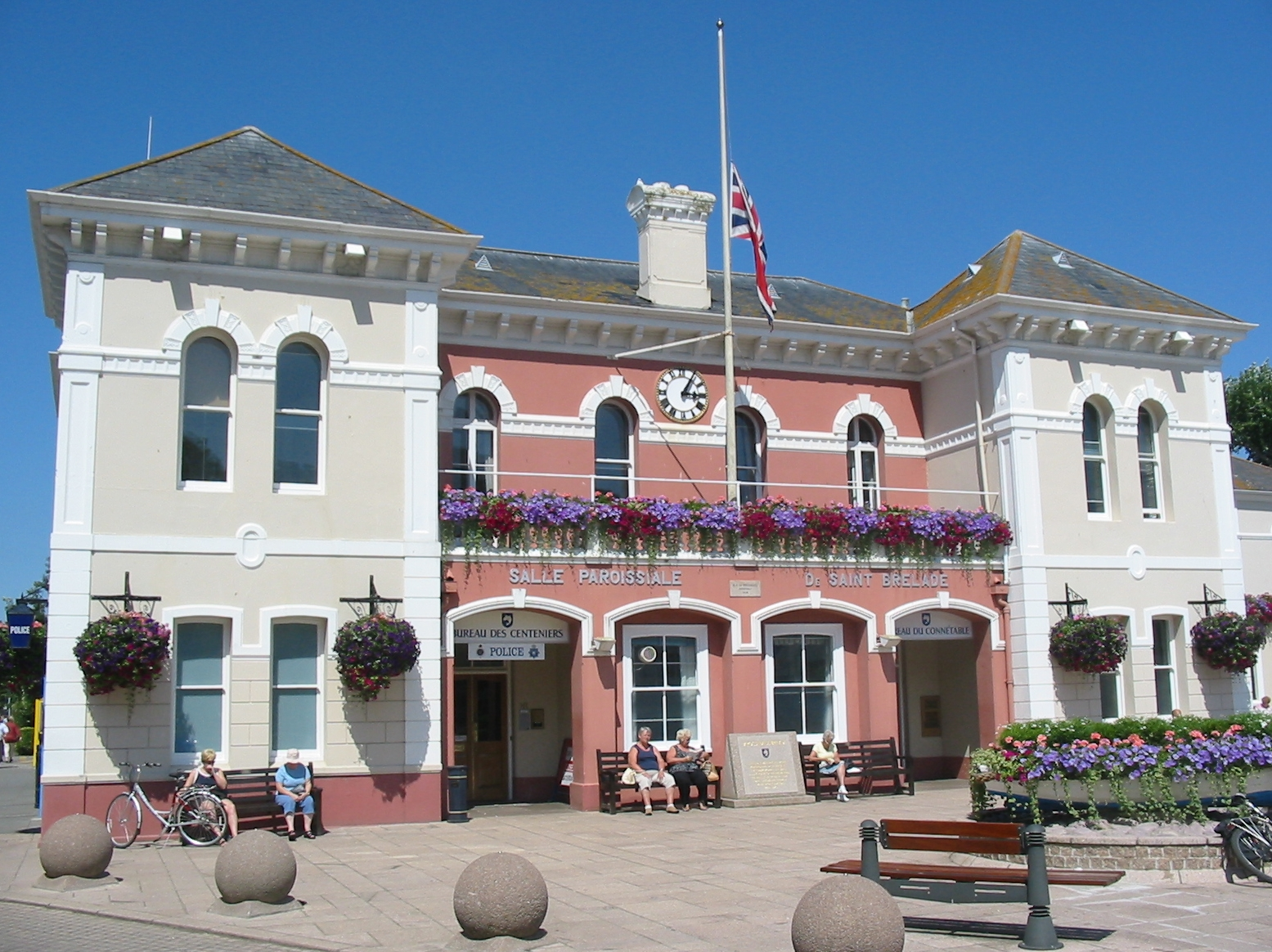
The station building in 2005

The main station building and hotel are now St Brélade's parish hall. The area used for platforms 1 and 2 is now a car park, whilst platform 3 was where a road now is leading to the car park.
