= Saint Aubin, Jersey =

Town and port in Saint Brelade, Jersey

Saint Aubin Saint Aubîn
- Town
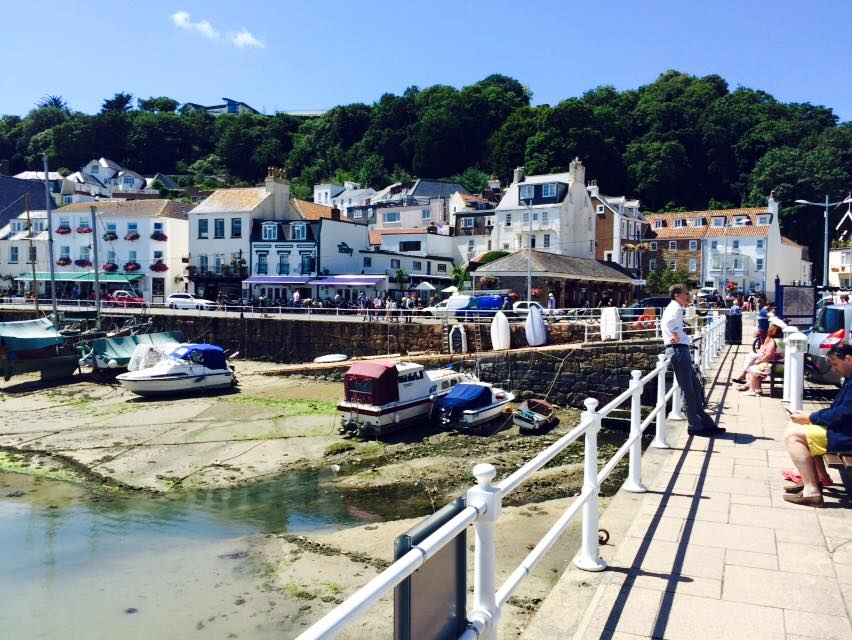
- The town's harbour

- Flag Coat of arms

- Location within Jersey Location within Channel Islands
- Coordinates: 49.1874°N 2.1704°W
- Crown Dependency: Jersey, Channel Islands
- Time zone: GMT
  - Summer (DST): UTC+01
- Postcode district: JE3
- Postcode sector: 8
- Website: stbrelade.je

St Aubin (Jèrriais: Saint Aubîn) is a town and port in La Vingtaine du Coin, St Brelade, Jersey. It is located on the western end of St Aubin's Bay, on the south coast of the island, opening out into the Gulf of Saint-Malo. It was originally a fishing village and the historic economic centre of the island. St Aubin is the civil administrative centre for the parish of St Brelade; however, ecclesiastically, the parish church is located in St Brelade's Bay. It retains a more historic character than St Helier, whose architecture has changed as the centre of Jersey's finance industry.

== Toponymy ==
Its name refers to Saint Aubin, the sixth century bishop of Angers, and may reflect the name of a long-disappeared chapel.

The town has been referred to variously as a town or a village. In Jersey, "town" is generally used as slang for the largest town on the island, St Helier.

== History ==
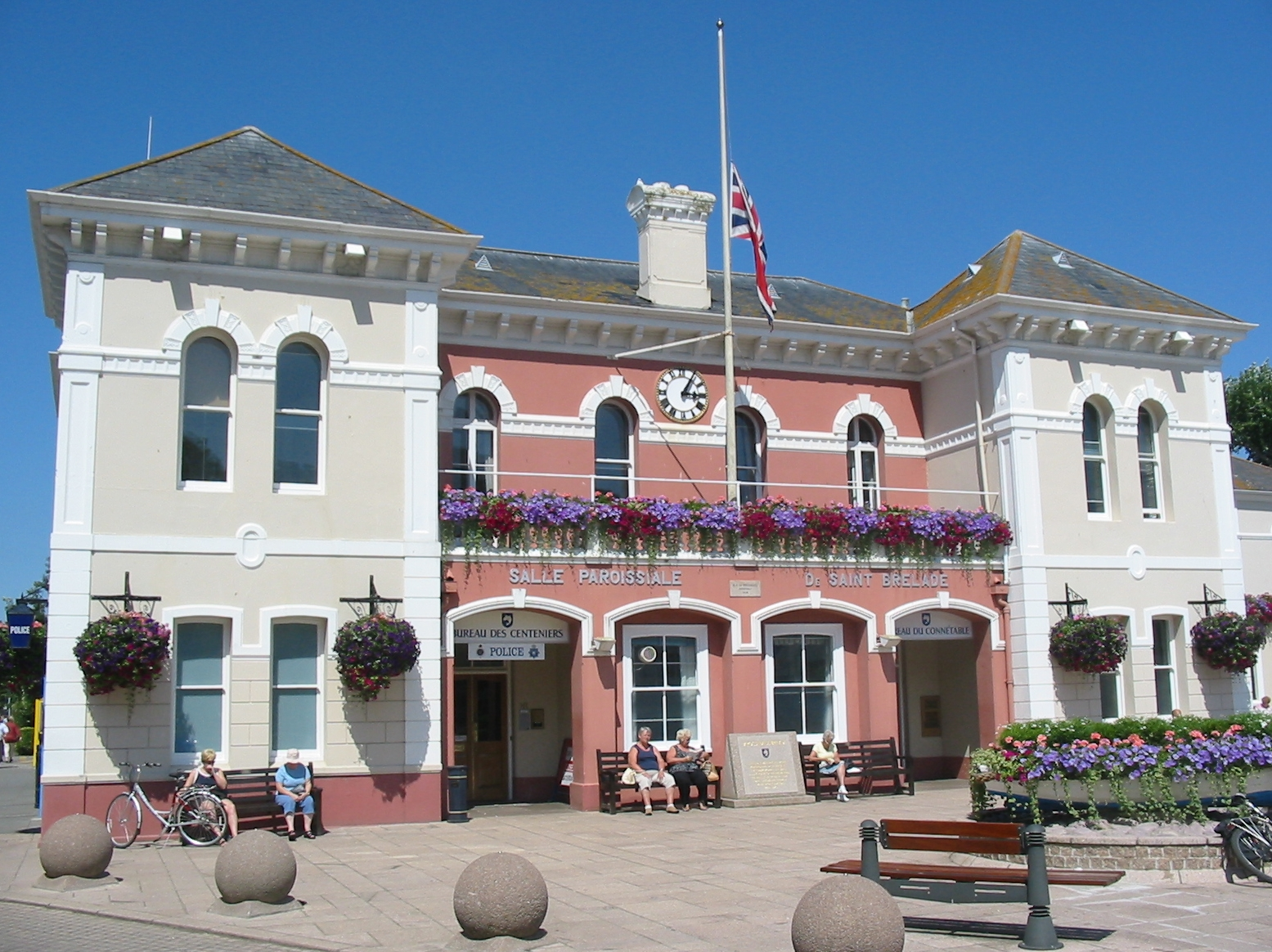
The parish hall of St Brelade is situated in St Aubin; it was the town's main railway station building

At the beginning of the 17th century, there was no quay in or road to St Aubin. At this time all the homes in the town were on the hillsides or up Mont les Vaux. In 1648, the States ordered the construction of a pier; however, there was still no road to the island's capital.

Although St Helier appears to have always been the Bailiwick's administrative capital and held the island's major market, St Aubin was historically the centre for international trade, particularly during the Newfoundland cod-fishery; this is because it was the only large port on the island. St Helier only had a small quay until 1840; however, after the development of St Helier's harbours, it was displaced as the major trading post.

In 1844, St Aubin's Road between St Helier and La Haule was finished, along with the road between La Haule and St Aubin, finally connecting the town to the island's largest settlement.

In the 19th century, the town of St Helier experienced a significant growth; this was due to the industrialisation of the island, and immigration from France and England. St Aubin did not follow the same pattern, being constrained by its hilly geography.

== Landmarks ==
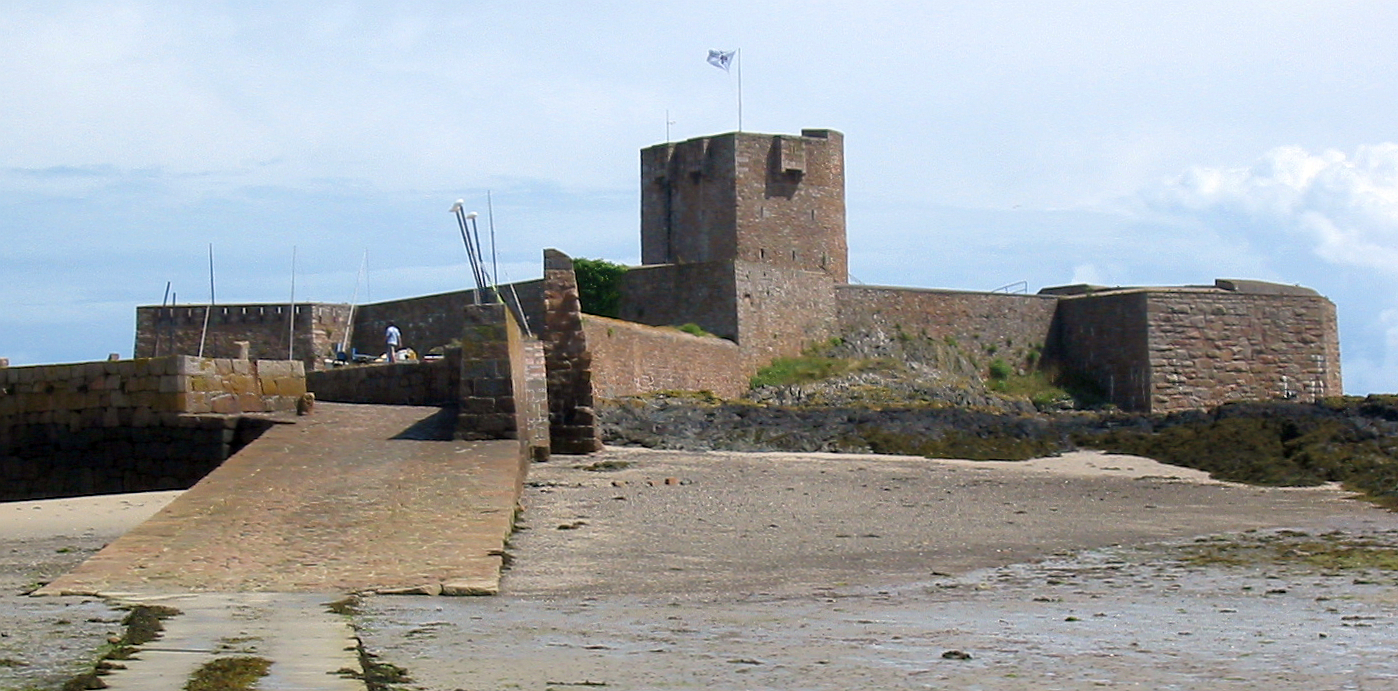
St Aubin's Fort

St Aubin's Fort (Note: Location: 49.1843°N 2.1614°W.) lies in the bay on a tidal island, just outside the harbour. This fort is accessible on foot, at a low tide, via a causeway that runs from the road just in front of the Royal Channel Islands Yacht Club. The fort features a tower keep that is surrounded by granite walls and ramparts. During the German occupation of the Channel Islands, the German forces added bunkers and other features to the fort.

The Old Court House is a historic building beside the harbour, parts of which date back to 1450. The front of the building was originally Osbourne House, a typical wealthy merchants home; the rear portion is the original Court House.

The Anglican church of St Aubin on the Hill is located uphill from the harbour. There is also the Catholic Sacred Heart Church.

== Climate ==
Saint Aubin enjoys a relatively warm version of temperate Oceanic climate (Cfb), with mild temperatures year round and rare negative extremes. There are relatively low precipitations at 1,002 mm (39 in) per annum, nearly all in form of rain or mist.

The four seasons are evident, with wet and mild winter starting in early December and ending in the beginning of March, changing into much sunnier and warmer spring which ends during May. Summers are sunny, warm and quite dry, then continues up to its end during September. Autumn experiences rapidly cooling temperatures and wetter weather lasts into the end of November.

Average round-the-clock temperatures in February are 7.5 °C (45.5 °F) and 16.8 °C (62.2 °F) in July. The whole year average is 12.2 °C (54.0 °F), the warmest place on the island.

Climate data for Saint Aubin
Month	Jan	Feb	Mar	Apr	May	Jun	Jul	Aug	Sep	Oct	Nov	Dec	Year
Mean daily maximum °C (°F)	8.0 (46.4)	8.1 (46.6)	11.4 (52.5)	14.0 (57.2)	17.3 (63.1)	20.4 (68.7)	22.4 (72.3)	22.3 (72.1)	19.8 (67.6)	15.8 (60.4)	11.6 (52.9)	8.9 (48.0)	15.0 (59.0)
Daily mean °C (°F)	5.5 (41.9)	5.4 (41.7)	8.0 (46.4)	10.4 (50.7)	13.5 (56.3)	16.7 (62.1)	18.8 (65.8)	18.8 (65.8)	16.5 (61.7)	12.6 (54.7)	8.9 (48.0)	6.4 (43.5)	11.8 (53.2)
Mean daily minimum °C (°F)	3.1 (37.6)	2.8 (37.0)	4.6 (40.3)	6.9 (44.4)	9.8 (49.6)	13.0 (55.4)	15.3 (59.5)	15.4 (59.7)	13.2 (55.8)	9.4 (48.9)	6.2 (43.2)	3.9 (39.0)	8.6 (47.5)
Average precipitation mm (inches)	95 (3.7)	72 (2.8)	65 (2.6)	50 (2.0)	54 (2.1)	45 (1.8)	43 (1.7)	53 (2.1)	72 (2.8)	84 (3.3)	103 (4.1)	107 (4.2)	843 (33.2)
Source: Climate-data.org

== Transport ==
Public transport is provided by four bus routes, operated by LibertyBus:

- 12: St Helier to Jersey Airport
- 12A: St Helier to La Corbière
- 14: St Helier to St Brelade's Bay
- 15: St Helier to Jersey Airport.

The Jersey Railway commenced operations between St Helier and St Aubin in 1870; it was extended to La Corbière in 1884. The railway closed after a major fire at St Aubin station in 1936. The main station building is now the parish hall, whilst a car park now occupies the platform area. The route to St Helier is now a promenade walk and cycle path; the Railway Walk rail trail follows the former trackbed to La Corbière.

== In popular culture ==
St Aubin featured as a filming location for the 1980s BBC Television series Bergerac. The Old Court House was used as a local restaurant and the exterior of the detective's flat behind it were used regularly.
