= Liberty Wharf =

Shopping centre in Saint Helier, Jersey

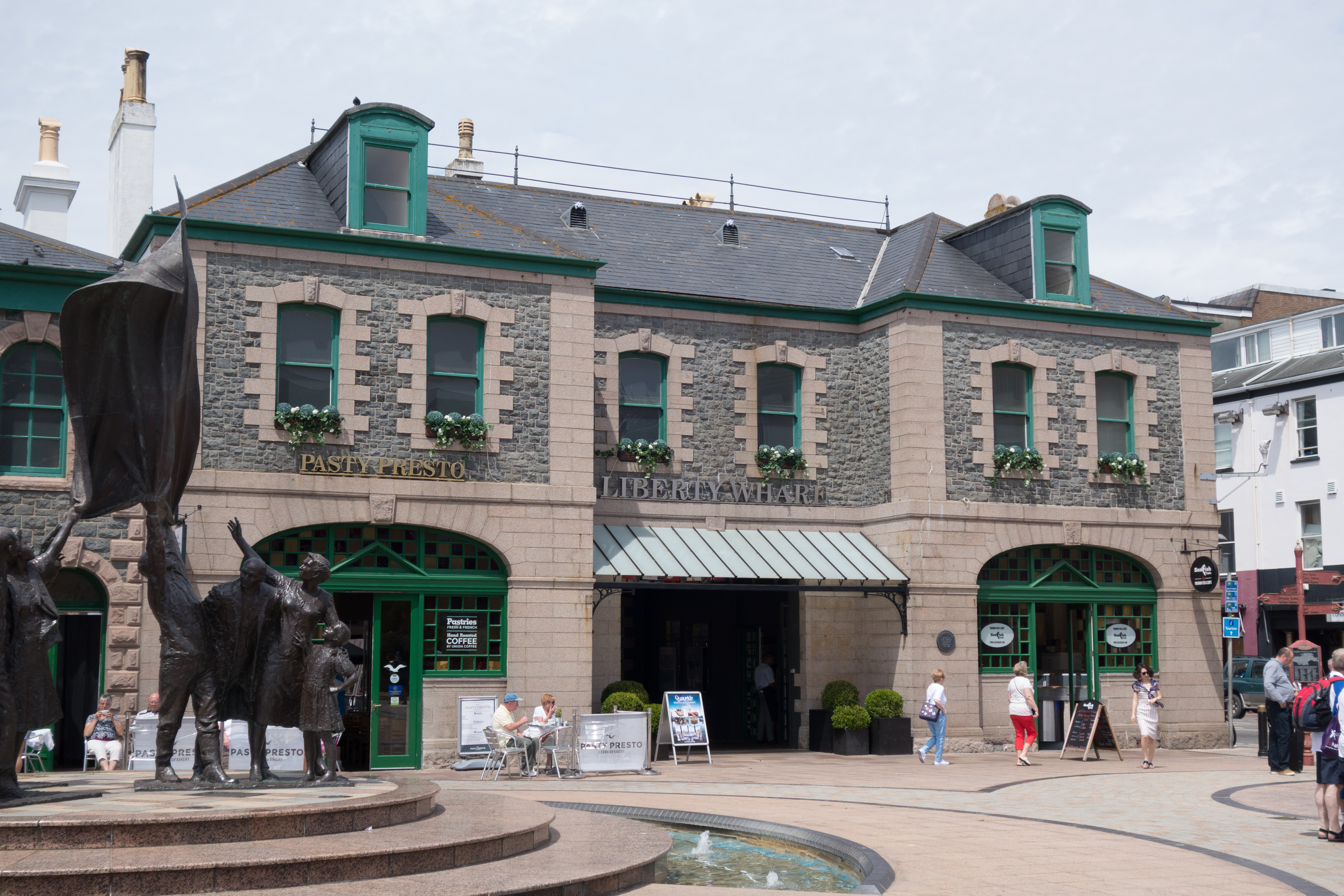
The former Weighbridge railway station forms part of Liberty Wharf

Liberty Wharf is a shopping centre in St Helier, Jersey, which was opened in November 2010.

The site is the former St Helier (Weighbridge) railway station, which was closed in 1936, and an abattoir. The buildings were restored and converted for use as a shopping centre in 2010.
