= Jersey Railway =

Former railway in Jersey

Coordinates: 49.186°N 2.107°W

Jersey Railway / Jersey Railways & Tramways
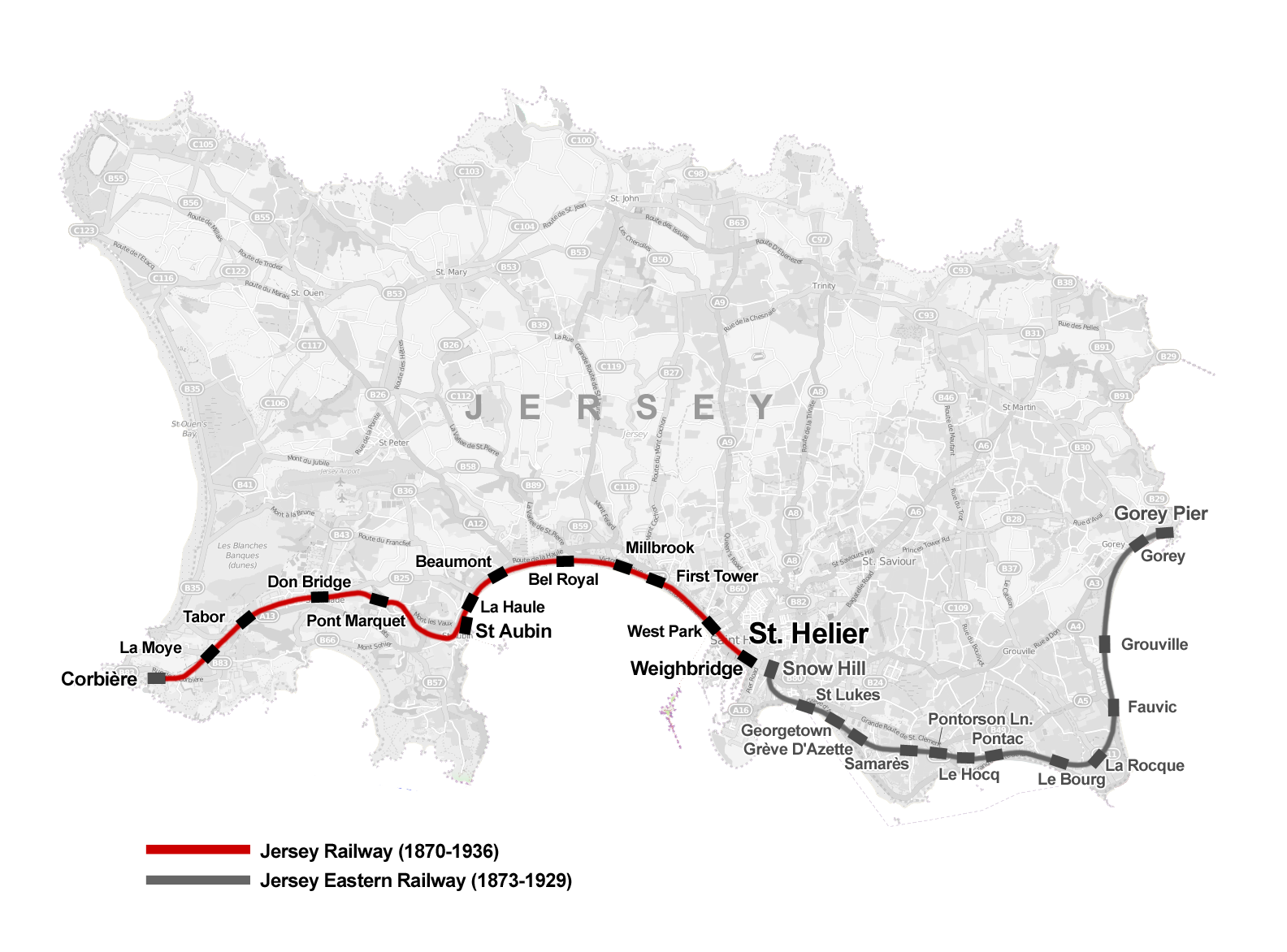
- The Jersey Railway highlighted on a map of the island's former railways

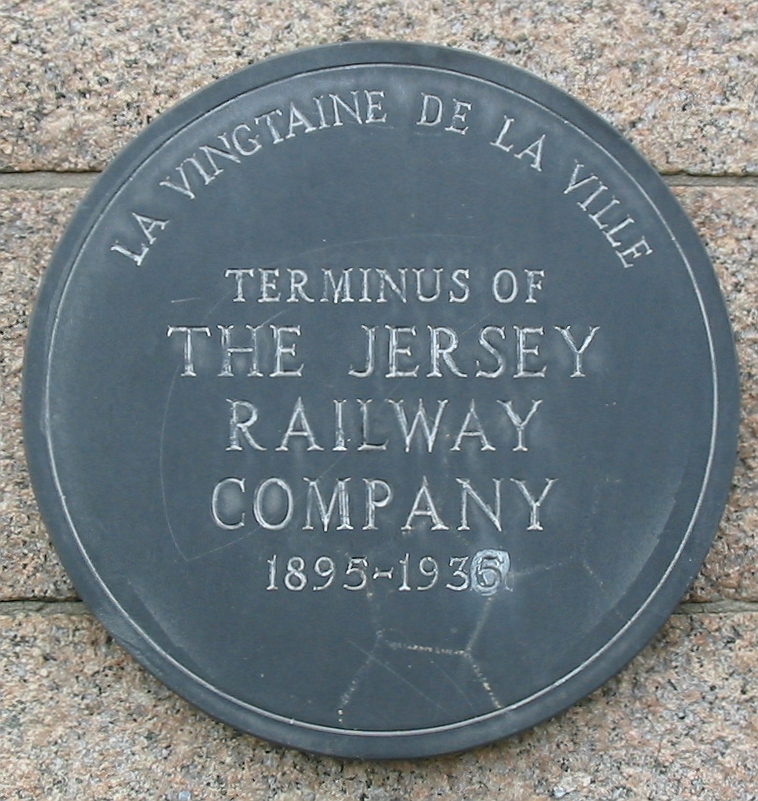
- Plaque on old St Helier terminus

Overview
- Headquarters: Saint Helier
- Locale: Jersey
- Dates of operation: 1870–1936
- Successor: Abandoned

Technical
- Track gauge: 3 ft 6 in (1,067 mm)
- Previous gauge: 4 ft 8 1/2 in (1,435 mm) standard gauge until 1884
- Length: 7 3/4 miles (12.5 km)

The Jersey Railway was originally a 3 3/4 miles (6.0 km) -long standard gauge railway on Jersey, in the Channel Islands. Opened in 1870, it was converted to 3 ft 6 in (1,067 mm) narrow-gauge in 1884 and extended 7 3/4 miles (12.5 km). The line was closed in 1936.

== History ==
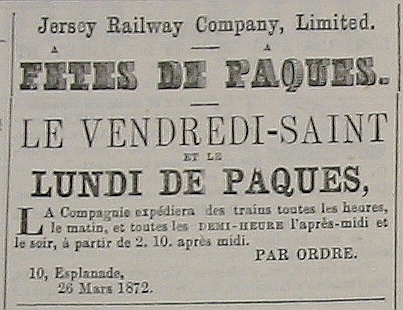
1872 advertisement for special Easter services

In 1864, the States of Jersey passed a law authorising the construction of the island's first railway. This standard gauge line was constructed, connecting St. Helier to St. Aubin, and the first train ran 25 October 1870. This railway was not a success and the company declared bankruptcy in 1874. The railway continued to operate, but passed through a succession of proprietors until 1883.

Meanwhile, the owner of a granite quarry near La Moye had petitioned to build a railway linking his quarry to St. Aubin. This law passed in June 1871 and the St Aubin & La Moye Railway commenced construction to the narrow gauge of 3 ft 6 in (1,067 mm) on Monday 11 August 1873 at a point near General Don's Farm. However, the construction did not proceed to plan and, in 1874, the states refused to allow an extension of time with the company, and the works were suspended. This resulted in 150 men being thrown out of employment. This line also ran into financial problems and, although construction trains ran on the section from La Moye to Pont Marquet, the company declared bankruptcy in 1878 before completion or opening to the public.

In 1883, the Jersey Railway and the partially completed St Aubin & La Moye Railway were amalgamated into the Jersey Railways Company Limited. The St. Helier to St. Aubin line was relaid to 3 ft 6 in (1,067 mm) gauge and the railway reopened to passengers on 15 March 1884, initially operating as two separate sections until the two lines were connected at St. Aubin to form a complete railway. The first through service ran between St Helier and La Corbière on 31 August 1884.

In 1894, the London Evening Standard reported that an attempt to wreck a train running round St Aubin's Bay was made by placing heavy stones on the rails. This was the third attempt within a few days. This railway also hit financial difficulties and entered voluntary liquidation in 1895.

In 1896, a new company, the Jersey Railways and Tramways Co. Ltd., was formed to take over the assets of the failed company. The railway was improved, with an extension to La Corbière Pavilion opening in 1899 and was successful up to the outbreak of the First World War. The railway continued during the war but, by 1917, traffic had declined significantly.

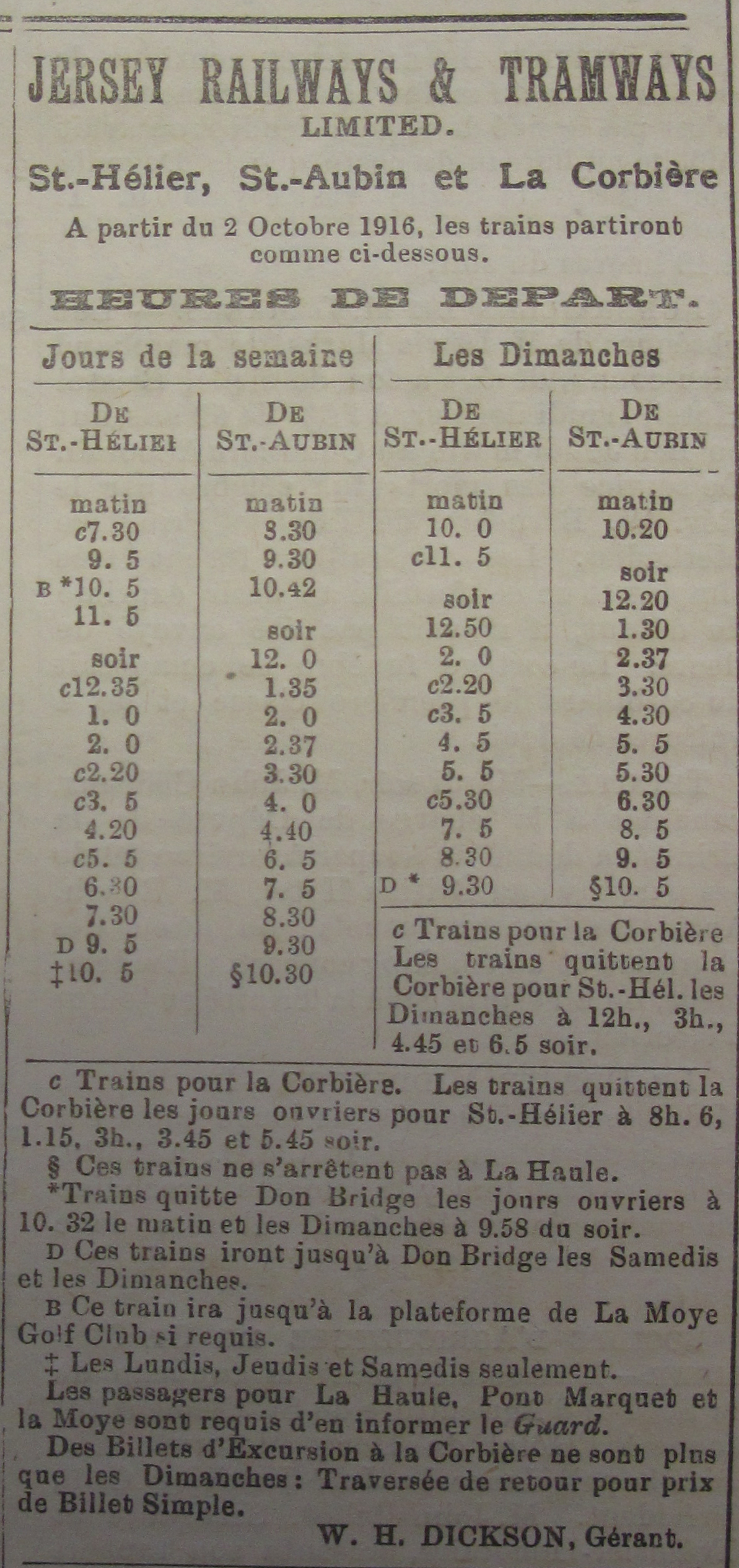
1916 timetable of services

In 1922, the decision was made to introduce railcars to reduce operating costs. In 1923, Sentinel-Cammell steam railcars were demonstrated on the railway; they accommodated 56 passengers, were 56 feet 5 inches (17.20 m) long, weighed 14 tons and could be driven from either end. These helped the company to revive its fortunes in the mid-1920s, with 1925 being the peak in terms of passengers carried and profitability. The Jersey Railway was not a typical sleepy narrow gauge railway, instead operating a very intensive commuter-style timetable peaking at 32 trains in each direction in 1925, when almost 1.1 million passengers were carried.

By 1928, competition from buses and private cars was threatening the railway's future. The decline was quite rapid and, by 1932, the winter service had been withdrawn. In October 1936, a fire destroyed the roof of St Aubin station and consumed 16 carriages. The line did not reopen for the 1937 summer season; all remaining locomotives and railcars were scrapped in 1937.

The States of Jersey purchased the route of the line from St Helier to La Corbière on 1 April 1937 for the sum of £25,000. The rails were lifted and the smaller stations were demolished.

== The route ==
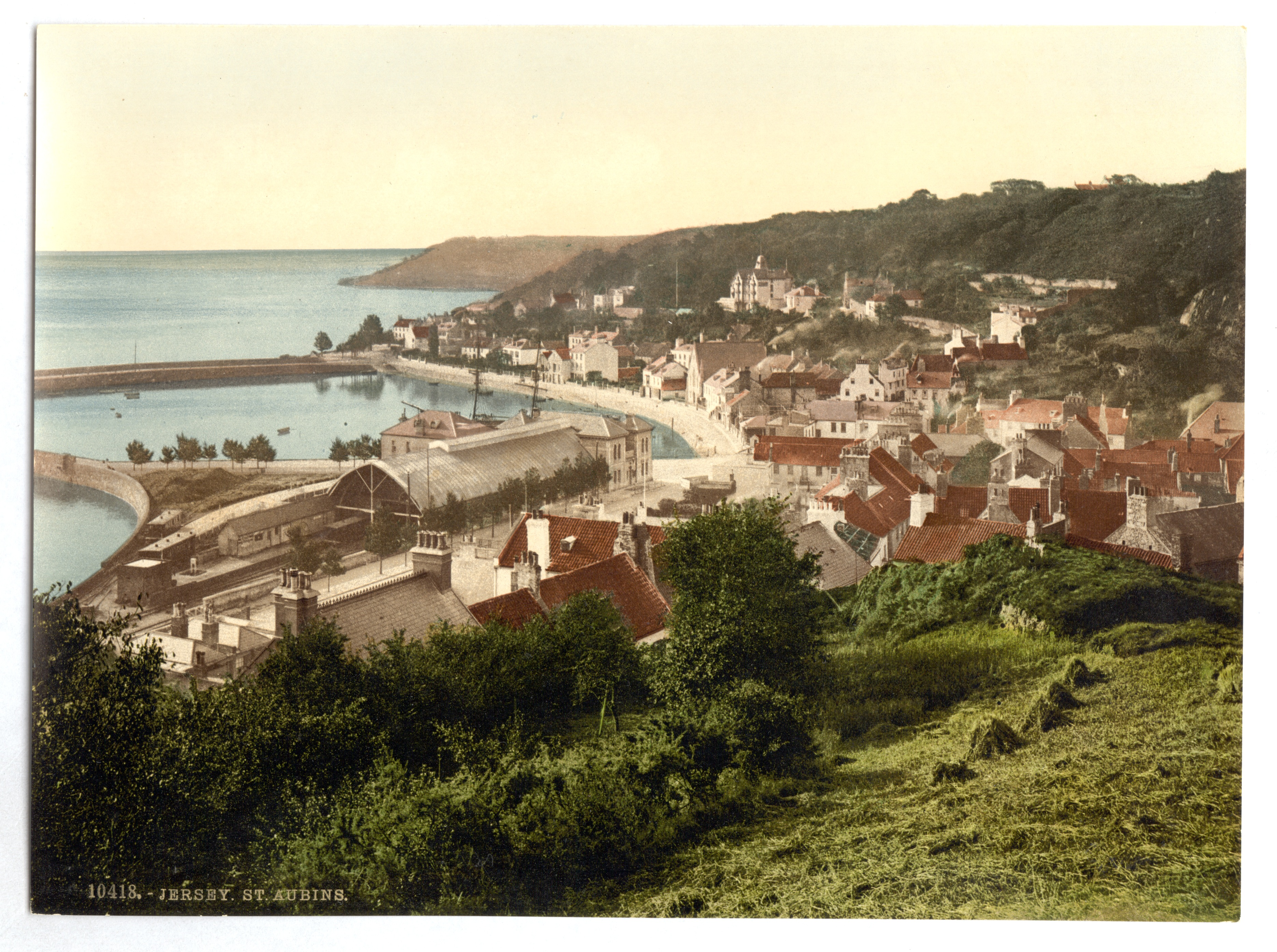
View of St Aubin, showing station building

The Jersey railway, in its final form, was a single track route, with passing places at the termini, Millbrook, St Aubin and Don Bridge.

The main station at St Helier (now Liberation Square) was the operating headquarters of the line and featured an impressive building, glass roof and two platforms.

The locomotive sheds and maintenance workshops were also at this location. The workshops were capable of very heavy repair work and the manufacture of carriages – the distance from the mainland made the railway very self-sufficient.

Between St Helier and St Aubin, the railway ran a picturesque route along the seafront, between the beach and main promenade road (Victoria Avenue).

Millbrook station featured two platforms and a footbridge. It was moved and rebuilt on a new site in 1912 to make way for an extension to the seafront promenade.

St Aubin station, the original limit of operations, had two platforms and another impressive glass roof. When the line was extended to La Moye in 1884, an additional platform was added, bypassing the original terminus that continued in use for the St Helier–St Aubin trains.

After St Aubin, the railway turned sharply inland through a rock-lined tunnel and climbed steeply away from the sea, rising over 200 feet (61 m) in 1 1/2 miles (2.4 km) with gradients as steep as 1 in 30. The summit was reached just after Don Bridge station. The track then dropped towards La Corbière where the substantial granite-built station overlooked the lighthouse. Corbière station had a loop line, but only one passenger platform.

== German occupation ==
On 1 July 1940, German forces occupied Jersey; Hitler declared that the Channel Islands would become an impregnable fortress.

Work was soon begun building gun emplacements, bunkers, tunnels and sea walls. To support this work, the occupying German army (Organisation Todt) reopened almost the entire St. Helier to La Corbière line to 1,000 mm (3 ft 3 3/8 in) gauge. This line was used for construction materials and never carried passengers. A branch line was built to serve the large granite quarries at Ronez in the north of the island; this joined the La Corbière line at Pont Marquet. At the St Helier end of the line, the original Weighbridge terminal was bypassed and the rails went direct to the dockside quays to link with the 60 cm gauge lines in the east of the island; it followed the route of the old Jersey Eastern Railway which had closed in 1929.

Steam and diesel locomotives worked the line for the duration of the Second World War, but it had fallen out of use by 1945 and the line was taken up at the cessation of hostilities by the liberating troops.

== Proposed revival ==
In January 2012, a proposal was made to reinstate 3 1/2 miles (5.6 km) of track between St Aubin and Corbière. An offer of a 2 ft (610 mm) gauge steam locomotive was made.

As of 2025, Jersey Western Railway Limited has begun efforts to return the full length of the railway between St Helier and La Corbière.

== Remains of the railway today ==
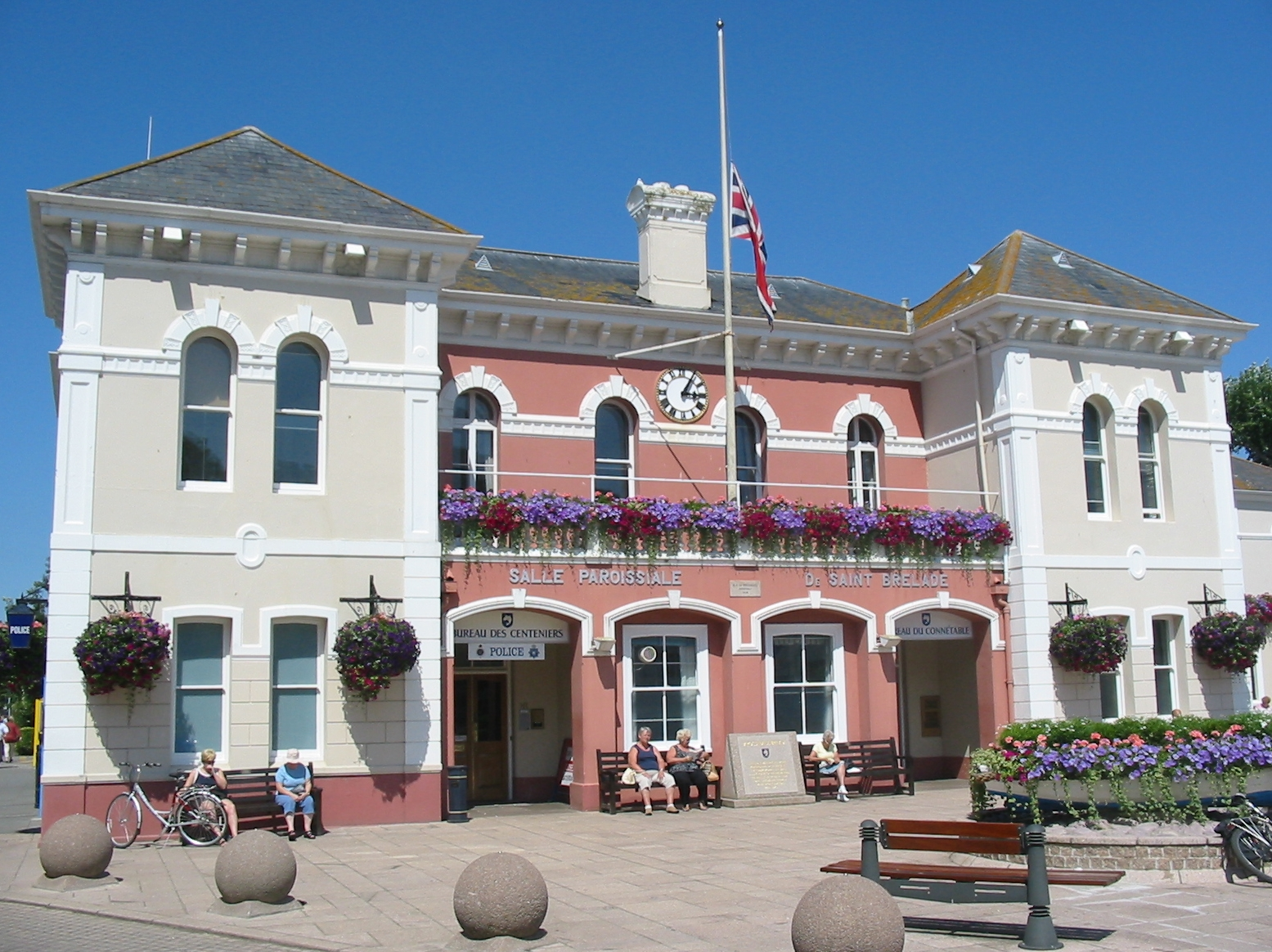
Frontage of the former St Aubin terminus building

It is possible to walk or cycle over the entire route of the Jersey Railway, as a seafront promenade and cycling trail now occupy the trackbed.

In St Helier, the 1901 headquarters and terminus building at the Weighbridge housed Jersey Tourism until 2007, although the trainshed has been demolished. The site behind the former terminus building is now Liberation station, the main bus terminus.

The intermediate station at Millbrook (built 1912) is now the Old Station Cafe; the station building and hotel at St Aubin now serves as the parish hall of St Brelade. Beyond St Aubin, the tunnel built in 1899 to avoid some tight curves is still there, although much enlarged during the Second World War as a munitions store.

Walkers can view the trackbed and its bridges, embankments and cuttings right to La Corbière. The Old Station House at La Corbière, registered as a Building of Local Interest, was sold by the States of Jersey to the private sector in 2004. Planning permission was granted to convert the house into a modern architectural showpiece.

The locomotive nameplates are preserved by the National Railway Museum, in York, England, and locomotive no. 5 La Moye is preserved intact in South Africa, where she worked in industry until 1992. A coach body and artefacts are preserved at the Pallot Steam Museum in Jersey and other artefacts are on display in the Jersey Museum in St Helier.

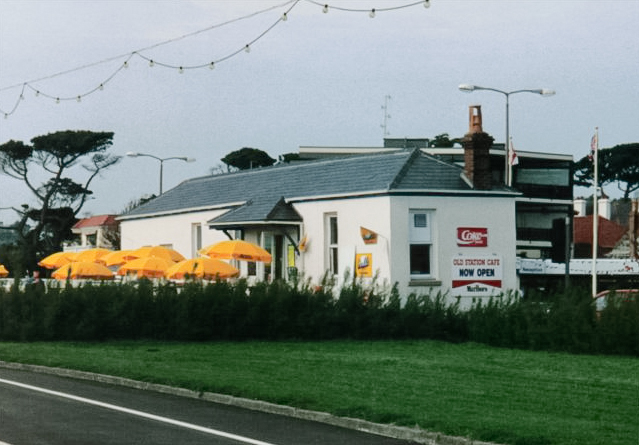
The former Millbrook station building, now the Old Station Cafe.

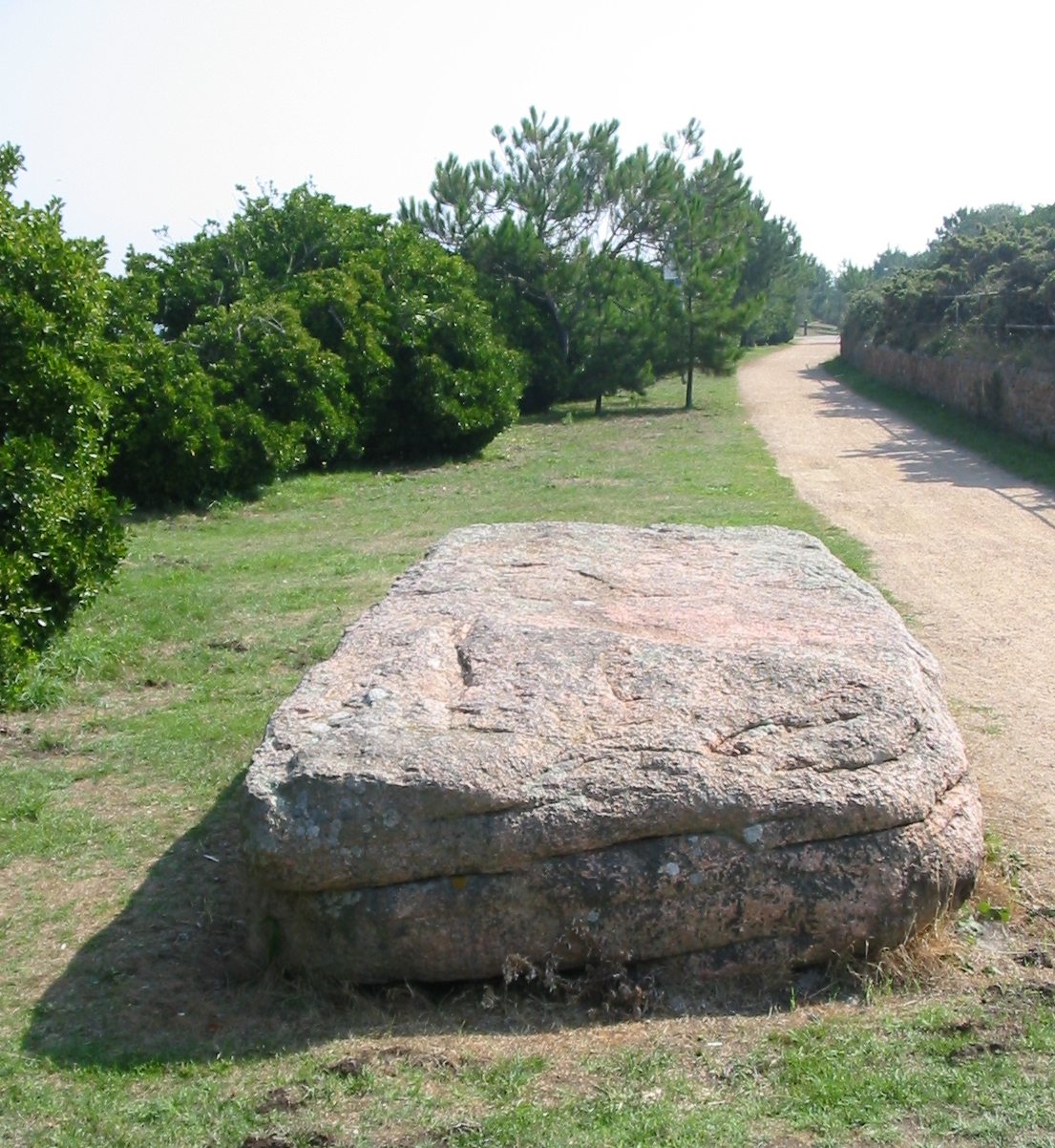
The prehistoric megalith La Table des Marthes lies alongside the trail at La Corbière. The former platform can be seen on the other side of the trail.

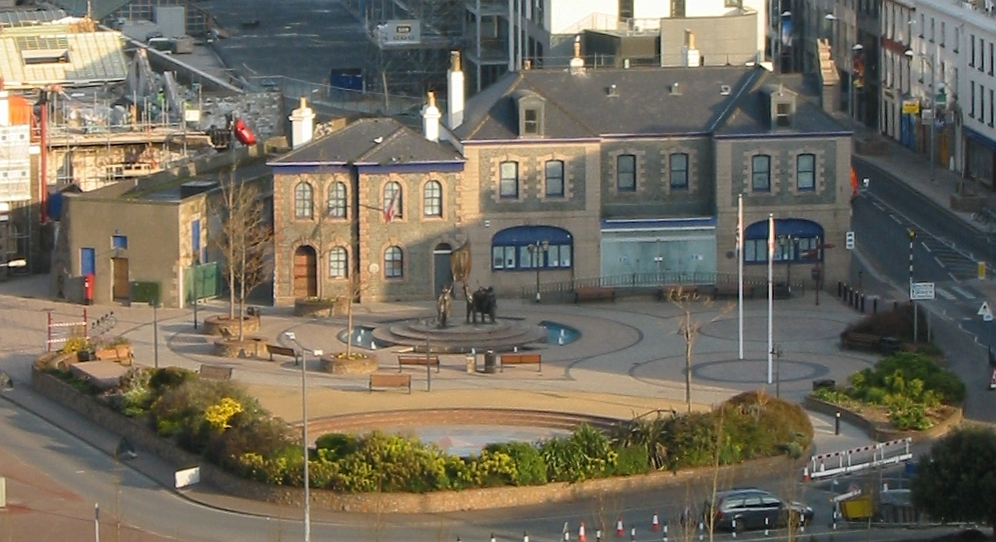
The façade of the former St Helier terminus can be seen here, with the Liberation station bus terminus and construction site behind.

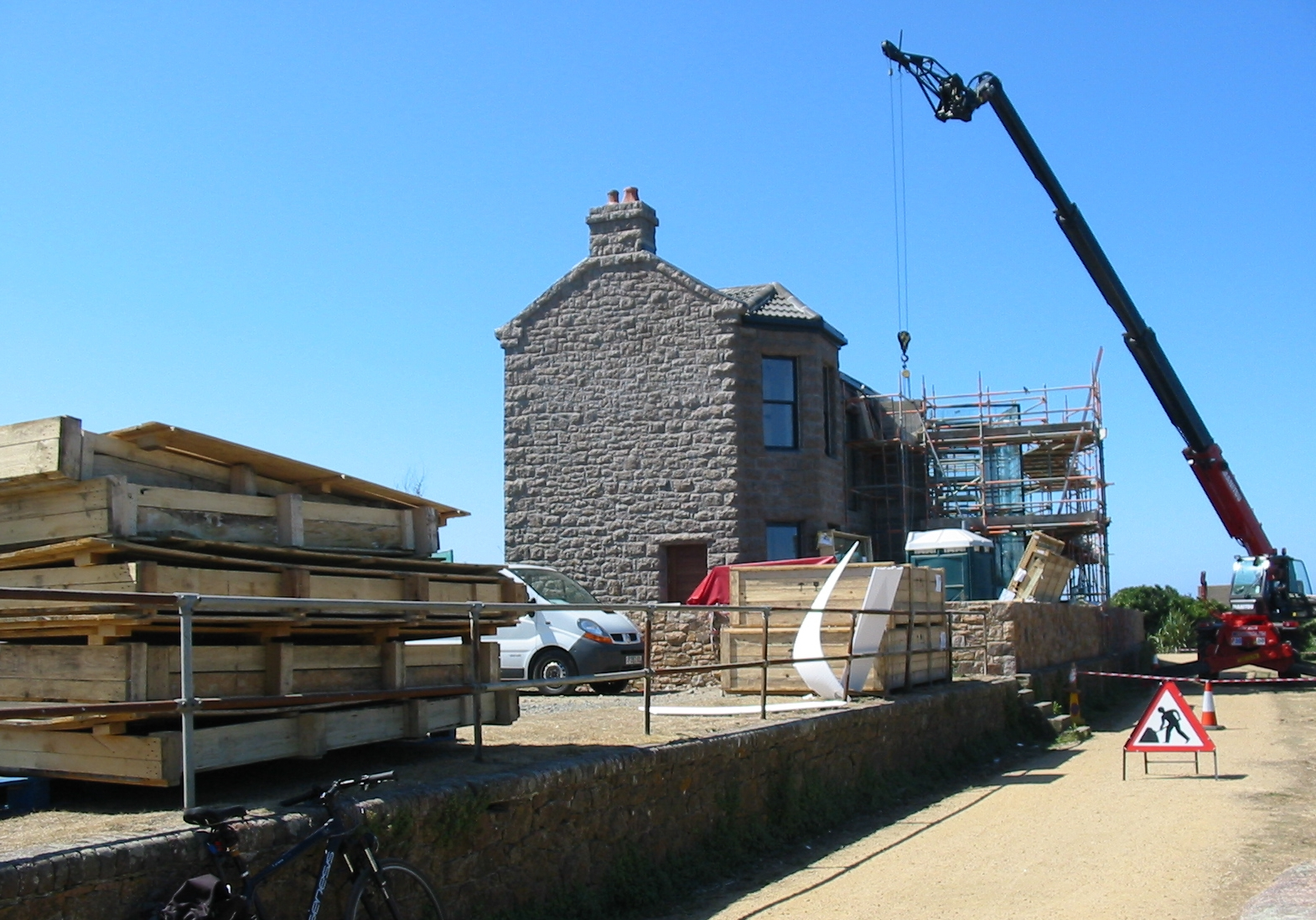
The Old Station House at La Corbière was converted to a contemporary dwelling in 2008.

== Standard gauge locomotives ==
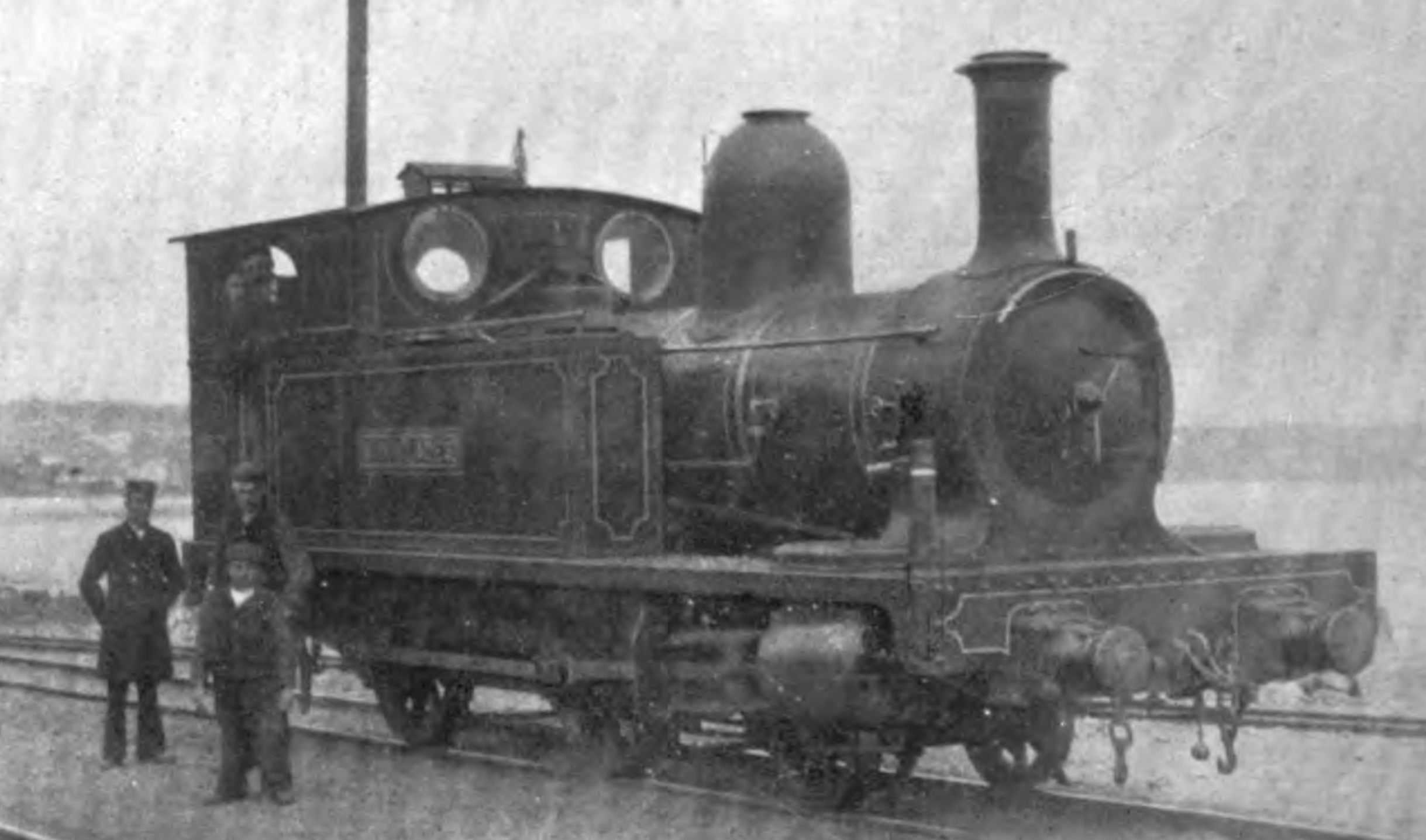
Jersey Railway no. 4 St. Brelades, built in 1893 by W.G. Bagnall

Name	Builder	Type	Date built	Works number	Notes
Haro Haro	Sharp Stewart	2-4-0T	1870	2047	Withdrawn in September 1884 when gauge changed. Used during construction of the Manchester Ship Canal (opened May 1894). Sold to the Woolpit Brick & Tile Co, Suffolk (photo).
Duke of Normandy	Sharp Stewart	2-4-0T	1870	2048	Withdrawn in September 1884 when gauge changed. Used during construction of the Manchester Ship Canal (opened May 1894). Sold to Thos. W. Ward of Sheffield and resold in 1897 to the Vulcan Foundry, Newton-le-Willows as a yard shunter. Scrapped 1904. (Photo of 'Haro Haro' and 'Duke of Normandy' at St Helier c1870 )
	Sharp Stewart	2-4-0T	1871	2140	Larger design than Haro Haro and Duke of Normandy. Reshipped to Tunis Railway, Tunisia, in May 1872.
North Western	Sharp Stewart	2-4-0T	1872	2241	Identical replacement for #2140 above. Sold to Jersey Eastern Railway in May 1878. Resold for use in a Scottish quarry and left Jersey in 1898.
General Don	Dubs	2-4-0T	1879	1222	Withdrawn in September 1884 when gauge changed. Sold to North Cornwall Railway then to Weston, Clevedon and Portishead Railway in 1901. Renamed Clevedon in 1906. Scrapped in 1940. (Photo )

== Narrow gauge locomotives and railcars ==
Number	Name	Builder	Type	Date built	Works number	Notes
	General Don	Black Hawthorne	0-4-2ST	1877		Supplied to and used in construction of the St Aubin & La Moye railway. Left Jersey by 1900.
		Black Hawthorne	0-4-2ST	1877		Supplied to and used in construction of the St Aubin & La Moye railway. Left Jersey by 1900
1	St. Heliers	Manning Wardle	2-4-0T	1884	916	Rebuilt with larger boiler in 1910. Scrapped in Jersey. Nameplates preserved at National Railway Museum, York (NRM). (Photo at St Aubin station)
2	St. Aubins	Manning Wardle	2-4-0T	1884	917	Rebuilt with larger boiler in 1909. Scrapped in Jersey. Nameplates preserved at the NRM.
3	Corbiere	W. G. Bagnall	2-4-0T	1893	1418	Rebuilt with larger boiler in 1907. Scrapped in Jersey. Nameplates preserved at the NRM.
4	St. Brelades	W. G. Bagnall	2-4-0T	1896	1466	Rebuilt with larger boiler in 1912. Offered to the NRM for preservation in 1937; accepted but not delivered. The chimney is preserved at the NRM. Scrapped in Jersey. Nameplates preserved at the NRM. (Photo at St Helier Weighbridge station )
5	La Moye	Andrew Barclay	2-4-0T	1907	1105	Little used after 1918. Sold in 1928 to the Victoria Falls Power Company in South Africa (later ESCOM). Withdrawn from service in 1992. Currently owned by Eskom and leased to New Cape Central Railway. (Photo at St Helier Weighbridge station ) (Photo of loco in South Africa )
Railcar 1	Pioneer No. 1	Sentinel	Steam railcar	1923	4863	The first railcar built by Sentinel-Cammel. Scrapped / sold in 1935
Railcar 2	Pioneer No. 2 later Portelet	Sentinel	Steam railcar	1924	5159	A more powerful version of Pioneer No. 1 (Photo at St Aubin station)
Railcar 3	La Moye Also known as the Wembley Car	Sentinel	Steam railcar	1925	5833	Exhibited at the 1925 Wembley Exhibition.
Railcar 4	Normandy	Sentinel	Steam railcar	1925	5655	Purchased from the standard gauge Jersey Eastern Railway in 1930 via A.O. Hill Ltd. and converted to 3 ft 6 in (1,067 mm) gauge. W.J. Carmen states: After closure Normandy was used – with passenger accommodation removed to become a flatbed – to remove the track as it was lifted)

== See also ==
- List of Channel Islands railways
- British narrow-gauge railways
