= St Aubin on the Hill =

Church in Saint Aubin, Jersey

- St Aubin on the Hill
- 49.1881°N 2.1721°W
- Address: La Marquanderie, JE3 8EP
- Country: Jersey
- Denomination: Anglican

History
- Founded: 13 October 1892
- Dedication: Saint Aubin of Angers

Architecture
- Style: Gothic
- Groundbreaking: 4 June 1889

Administration
- Parish: St Brélade

St Aubin on the Hill is an Anglican church located in the Parish of St Brélade, Jersey, and is dedicated to Saint Aubin of Angers. Building of the present church began on 4 June 1889, with the laying of the foundation stone by the Bishop of Guildford. It was opened on 13 October 1892.

== History ==
Saint Aubin was a busy port at least as far back as the 16th century, with its own harbour and Court House. In 1747 a church was built at St Aubin, the first to be erected in the island since the Reformation. This was the result of a petition to the Bishop of Winchester from the merchants of St Aubin in which they made their case for the erection of a chapel of ease, in which they mentioned the difficulty of travelling to St Brelade, a distance of about two miles: "[T]he road to the said Church is very difficult by reason of many rugged steep ascents and descents, and a great way of moving sands, and the said inhabitants are exposed to great fatigue by sheer scorching heat in the summer, and the storms of impetuous westerly winds which usually blows there in Winter …"

The original church was a square building which stood on the site of the present church car park. In 1888 it was pronounced unsafe. A meeting was held on 19 April 1889, and it was resolved that a committee be formed to collect funds and arrange the building of a new church. The foundation stone of the present building was laid by the Bishop of Guildford on 4 June 1889.

The granite of the old building was re-used and the funds raised (£2,500) also allowed extra columns, arches and windows in Mont Mado granite.

St Aubin on the Hill is very fine example of a Victorian Gothic style building. The small north window in the Lady Chapel is notable for being the only Pre-Raphaelite window in Jersey, created by the firm of William Morris from designs by Sir Edward Burne-Jones. At the north end of the nave, the altar which bears the logo of the St Brelade Group of Churches, and the platform on which it stands, were added in the 1980s under the curacy of Robert Booth. In the early part of 1992 further re-ordering saw the removal of a number of pews and the construction of a platform around the font at the south end.

There were no burials at St Aubin until the 1980s, when authority was granted by the Ecclesiastical Court of Jersey to allow the curate, the Reverend Robert Booth to inter some ashes which had been sent for burial from England.

== Bibliography ==
- Balleine, G.R. (1974). Stevens, Joan (ed.). The Bailiwick of Jersey. Hodder & Stoughton. ISBN 0-340-00267-0.
