= St Helier railway station (Jersey Railway) =

Former railway station in Saint Helier, Jersey

St Helier (Weighbridge) Saint Hélyi
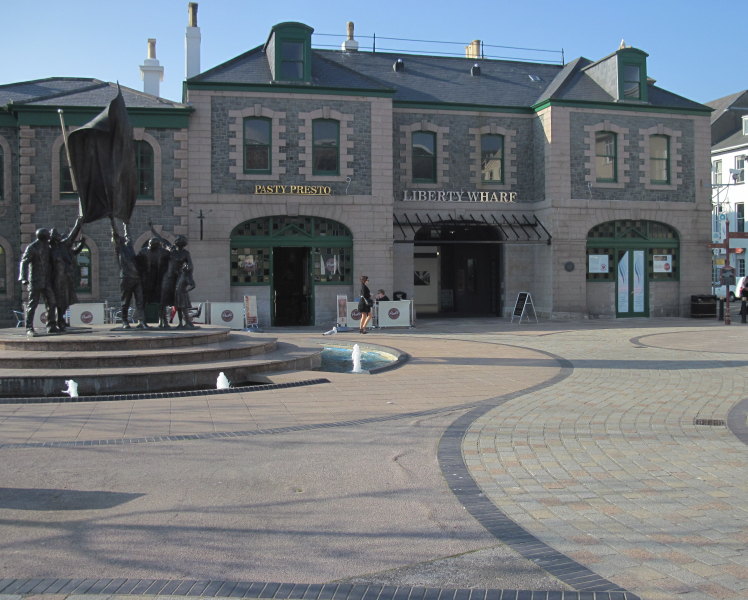
- The old station building on Liberation Square

General information
- Location: Liberation Square, Saint Helier, Jersey, Channel Islands
- Coordinates: 49.182935°N 2.109219°W
- Owner: Jersey Railway
- Lines: Western line to St Aubin and Corbière

Construction
- Architect: Adolphus Curry (1901)

Other information
- Status: Closed

History
- Opened: 25 October 1870
- Closed: 30 September 1936
- Rebuilt: 1901
Route map
Location
- Location within Jersey

St Helier railway station served the town of Saint Helier, the capital of Jersey, in the Channel Islands. Opened in 1870 by the Jersey Railway, it was situated on the western side of the Weighbridge area, now Liberation Square. The station was referred to as St. Helier (Weighbridge) to distinguish it from the town's other railway terminus, which was opened by the Jersey Eastern Railway in 1873 at Snow Hill. The station was in passenger operation until the line was closed in 1936.

== History ==
The Jersey Railway first opened in 1870, running services between Weighbridge station and St Aubin, with trains stopping at the three intermediate stations: First Tower, Millbrook and Beaumont. The first trial service ran on 28 September, and on the following day a train carrying 300 invited guests departed from Saint Helier. The line was formally opened to passengers on 17 October with a grand ceremonial opening followed by a banquet at Noirmont Manor, the residence of the contractor, Mr E. Pickering. On the opening day, 4,000 single journeys were made on the line.

The station was originally built with a single platform under a curved trainshed. In March 1884, it was replaced with an island platform, with two lines and two additional outer lines; in 1893, the train shed was replaced.

The original station building was a single-storey structure, which remained in use for 30 years until the Jersey Railways & Tramways Limited (JR&T) took over the line in 1896. A new two-storey station building was built by the Jersey architect Adolphus Curry and was opened in 1901. It included a new booking office, refreshment rooms, company offices and a board room; shop spaces were provided on the ground floor. A large abattoir development was begun in 1888 adjacent to the station site.

During the summer months, the arrangement of the tracks was inadequate to cope with the frequency of trains; to speed up the turnaround of locomotives, a special slewing table was installed in 1902. This unusual mechanism was a moving track on wheels at the end of the line in front of the buffers. Station porters could move a locomotive sideways by disconnecting the section of track on which the locomotive was standing and slide it onto the adjacent headshunt track, allowing the engine to perform a turnaround.

== Closure ==
In 1936, the Jersey Railway closed to passengers after a devastating fire at Saint Aubin's train shed destroyed most of the company's rolling stock. The company sold all of its land and stations to the States of Jersey for £25,000 in 1937.

The platform at Weighbridge was removed and the train shed was turned into a bus depot for the Jersey Motor Transport Company to serve the Weighbridge bus station. The bus depot remained in operation on the site of the old station until it was demolished in the 1970s. The 1901 station building remained and was used as the Jersey tourist office until 2007.

== Occupation ==
During the Occupation of the Channel Islands by the Nazis in World War II, Organisation Todt reopened most of Jersey's former railway lines for military purposes, relaying tracks to one-metre gauge. The railways did not carry passengers, but were used to transport equipment and building materials as the occupying forces built fortifications using slave labour. Weighbridge station was not reopened, but the line was extended to the harbour, bypassing the station.

== The site today ==
The station site and adjacent abattoir buildings were redeveloped and reopened in 2010 as the Liberty Wharf shopping centre.
