= List of Channel Islands railways =

List of Channel Islands railways:

- Alderney Railway (working)
- Guernsey Railway (closed)
- Jersey Railway (closed)
- Jersey Eastern Railway (closed)
