= Jersey Eastern Railway =

Former railway line in Jersey

Coordinates: 49.182°N 2.107°W

Jersey Eastern Railway / Jersey Railways & Tramways
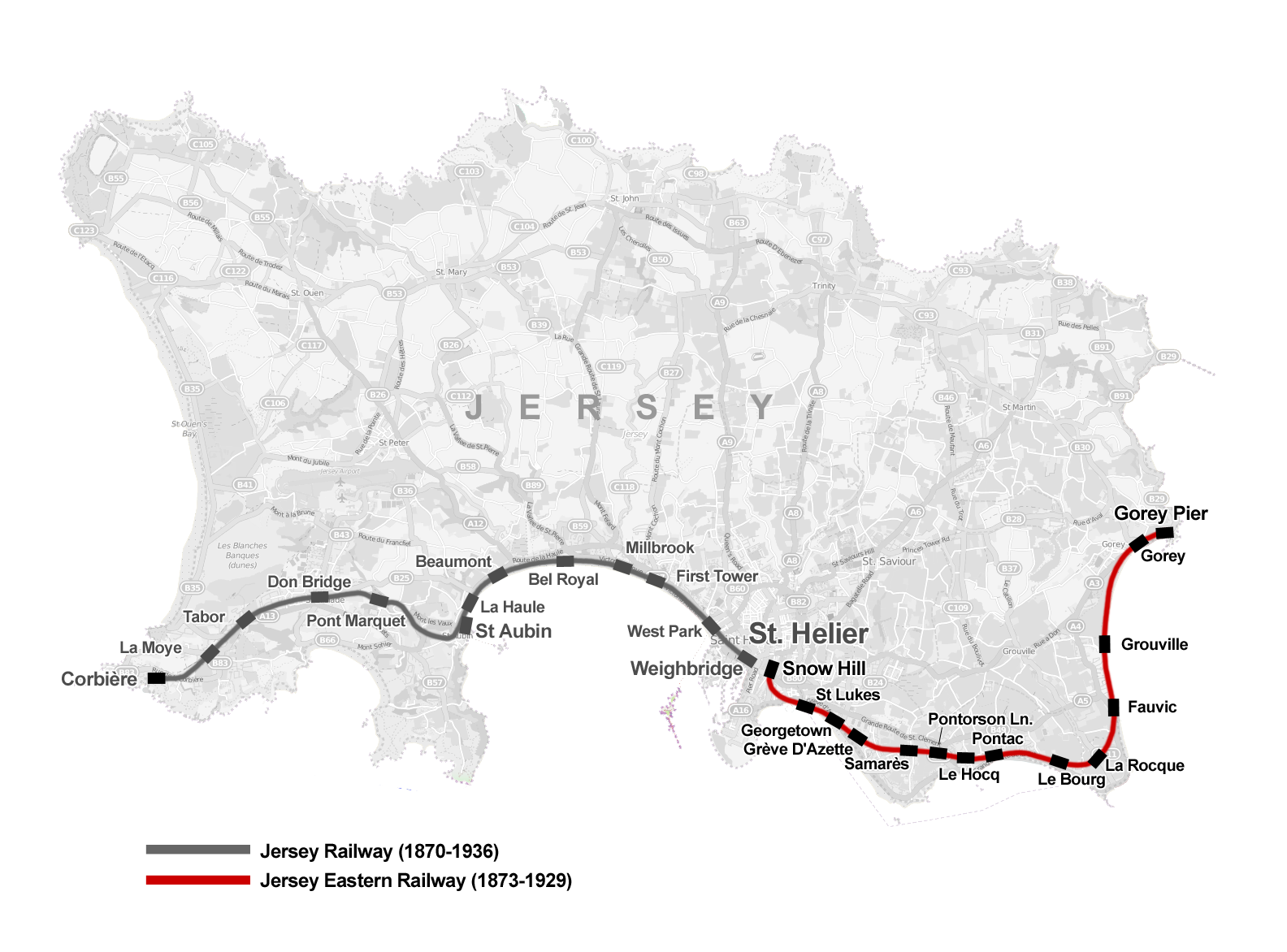
- Jersey Eastern Railway on a map of former railways of Jersey

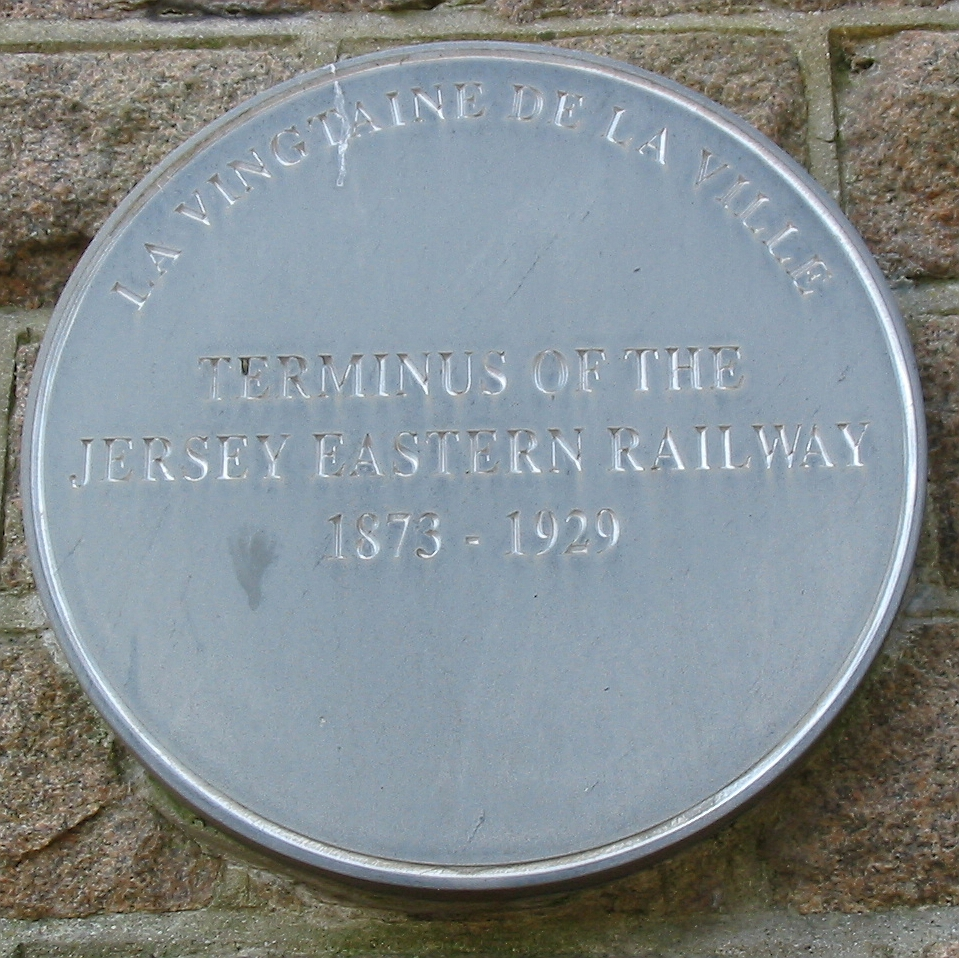
- Plaque at the former Snow Hill terminus in St Helier

Overview
- Headquarters: St. Helier
- Locale: Jersey
- Dates of operation: 1873–1929
- Successor: Abandoned

Technical
- Track gauge: 1,435 mm (4 ft 8 1/2 in)
- Length: 6.75 miles (10.86 km)

The Jersey Eastern Railway was a standard gauge railway that began operations on 6 August 1873 in Jersey. The line closed on 21 June 1929.

== History ==
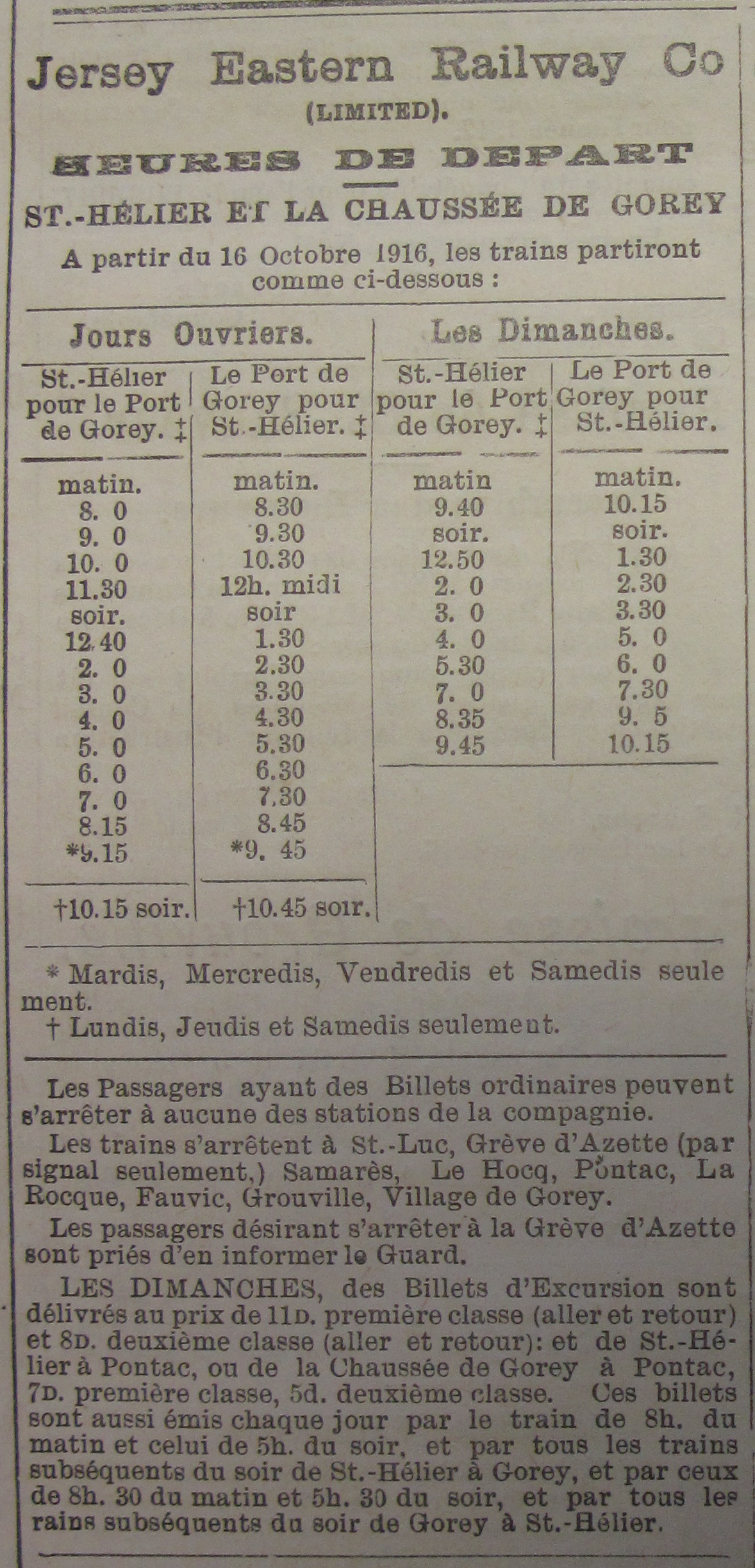
1916 timetable of services

The Loi pour l'établissement d'un Chemin de Fer entre la Ville de St.-Hélier et Gorey was approved on 16 March 1871 (confirmed by Order in Council 19 March 1872), with 68 articles of the projet in the name of the Jersey Eastern Railway Company Limited. The law (repealed by the Statute Law Revision (No. 3) (Jersey) Law, 1966) authorised the railway from Snow Hill in St Helier, to Gorey and from there to St Catherine's Bay in St Martin, although the latter route was never begun. There was no mention of gauge. Article 54 of the project was significant in stating that any disagreement with property owners must be resolved by the Royal Court for consideration and decision, and the claimant could not cause work to cease by raising the clameur de haro (as had happened with the Jersey Railway construction).

On 15 May 1871, the committee appointed by the States met to consider objections by landowners; the majority were satisfied that they had received fair compensation.

The first turf was dug by Mrs Mourant, wife of Edward Mourant, the chairman of the Board of Directors, at a private ceremony on 17 September 1872. The line was opened on 6 August 1873, with a train of six carriages taking the States Members and their wives along the track to Grouville Station in 15 minutes.

The official opening of Gorey station was on 25 May 1891, to coincide with Queen Victoria’s birthday. The journey of just over six miles from St Helier cost 9d (old pence) first class return, 6d second class return.

In 1923 the Jersey Motor Transport Company started a bus service carrying passengers all over the Island. The Jersey Eastern Railway tried to counter the fierce competition by running their own bus service in 1926, but this was not much of a success, and declining profits led to termination of both the bus and train services on 21 June 1929. The company itself was liquidated in 1932.

Most of the land was sold to adjacent landowners, but part of the route can be seen near Fauvic (at the southeastern tip of the island), where it has been preserved as a footpath.

The Jersey Eastern Railway Terminus Hotel at Snow Hill remains, and is on the Register of Historic Buildings.

== Route ==
The line began at Saint Helier, with intermediate stations located at Georgetown, Samarès, Le Hocq, Pontac, La Rocque and Fauvic, with the eastern terminus in Grouville, originally opposite the Wimbledon Hotel, later extended to Gorey and then to Gorey Pier.

== Locomotives ==
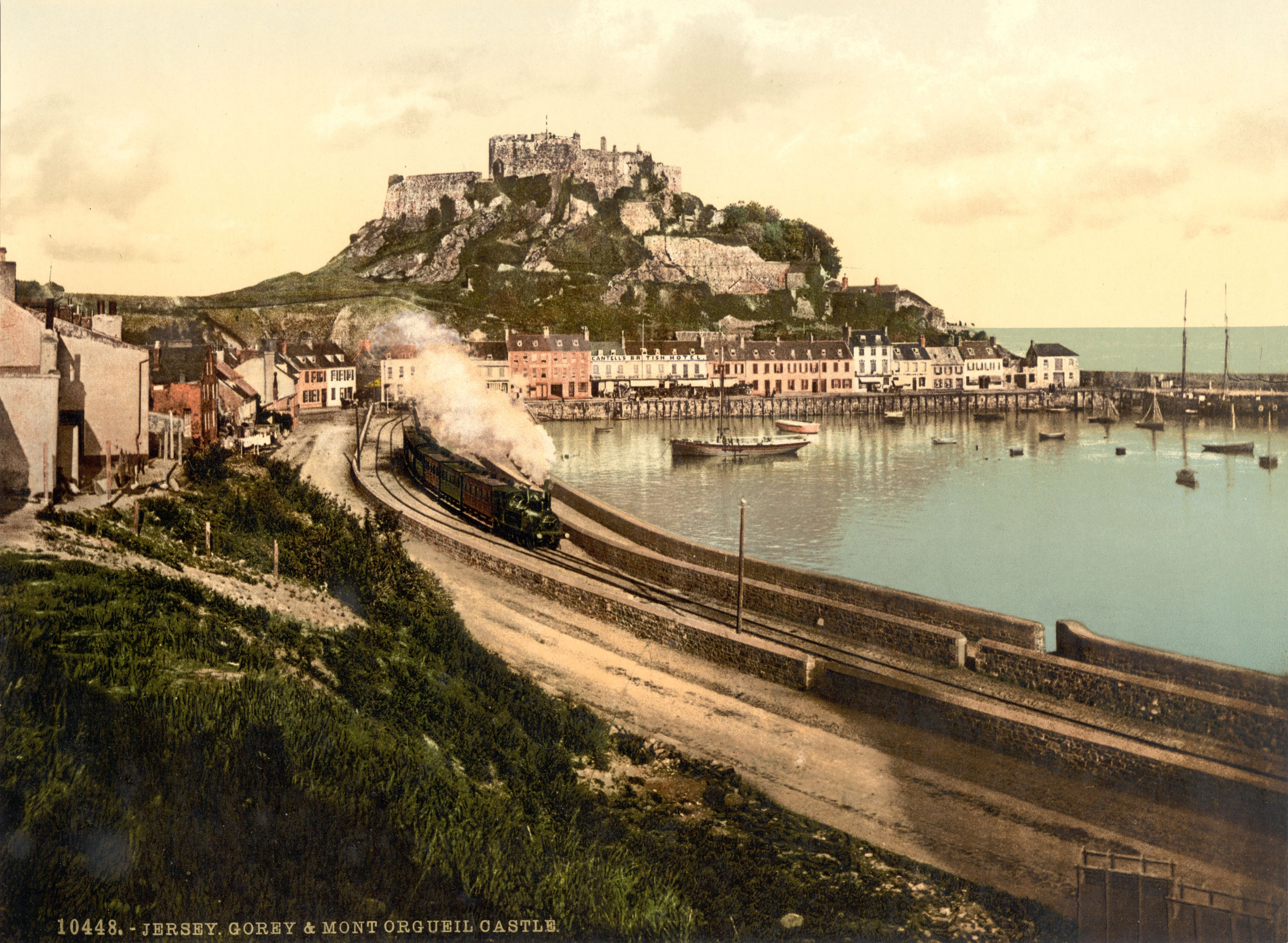
View of the railway at Gorey

- North Western 2-4-0T Built by Sharp Stewart in 1870, (Works No. 2047). Locomotive was purchased from the Jersey Railway in 1878 and was withdrawn in 1898 and eventually sold to a Scottish Quarry.

Messrs. Kitson & Co. of Leeds built all four of the following 0-4-2T engines:

- Caesarea, 1872. (Works No. 1832)
- Calvados, 1872. (Works No. 1833)
- Mont Orgueil, 1886
- Carteret, 1898. (Works No. 3800)

== Railcars ==
- Normandy
- Brittany

Both were built by Sentinel Waggon Works and purchased in 1927. Both were withdrawn on 21 June 1929 when the line closed, with Normandy being regauged and sold to the Jersey Railway.

== See also ==
- List of Channel Islands railways
