= Millbrook railway station (Jersey) =

Railway station in Jersey, Channel Islands

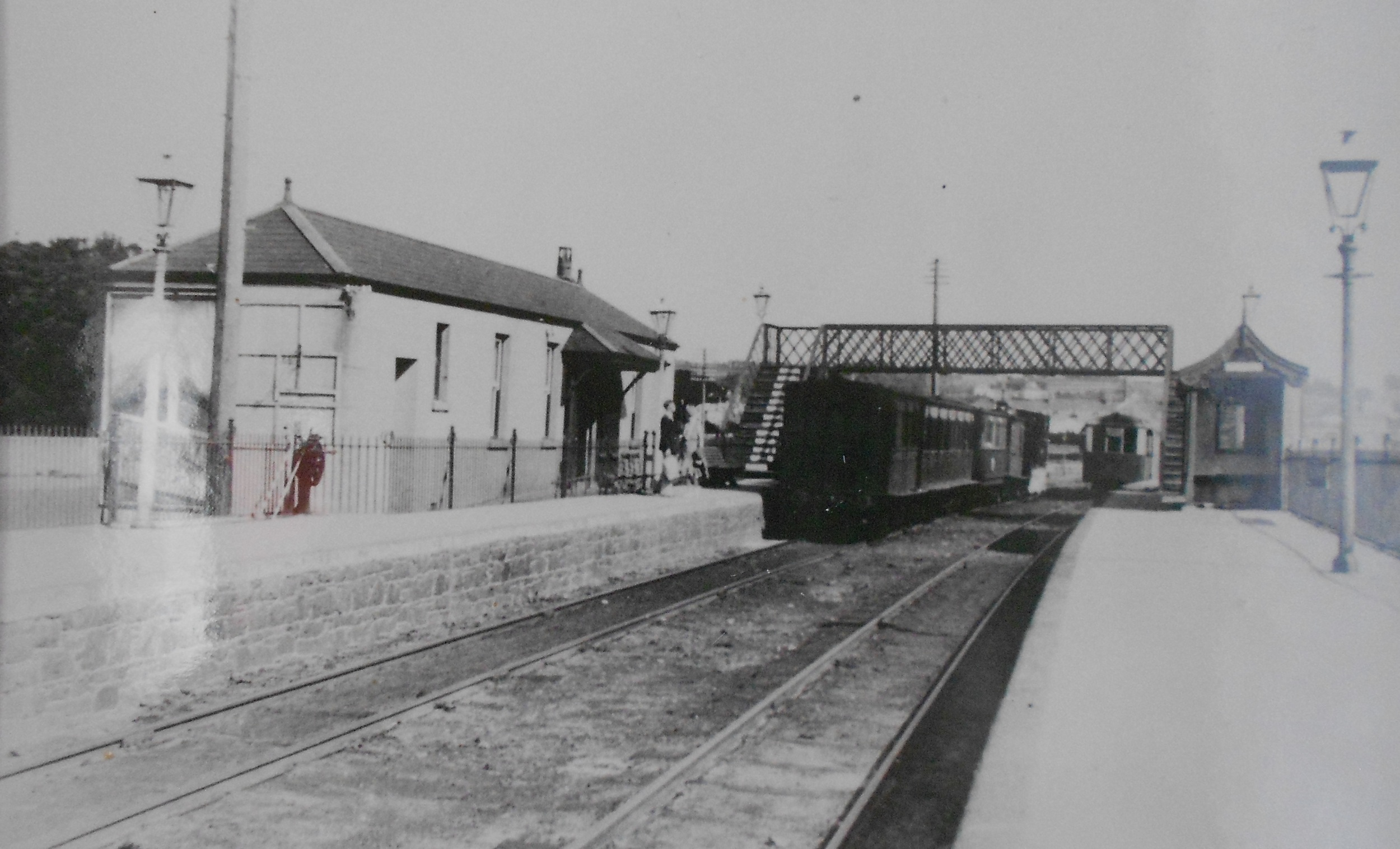
- Millbrook railway station around the time of the First World War

General information
- Location: Victoria Avenue, Millbrook, St Lawrence, Jersey, Channel Islands
- Coordinates: 49.196493°N 2.137812°W
- Owner: Jersey Railway
- Lines: Western line to St Aubin and Corbière
- Platforms: 2
- Tracks: 2
- Train operators: Jersey Railway

Other information
- Status: Closed

History
- Opened: 25 October 1870
- Closed: 30 September 1936
- Rebuilt: 1912
Route map
Location
- Location within Jersey

Millbrook railway station was an intermediate stop on the Jersey Railway, a mixed passenger and freight railway line, in Jersey, Channel Islands, between 1870 and 1936. The main station building is now used as the Old Station Café.

== History ==
Millbrook station opened in 1870 when the railway first began operations. The standard gauge line was relaid to narrow gauge in 1884. In 1912, the station site was slightly relocated owing to a road widening scheme and the new facility was built. It had two platforms, each with buildings, and were connected by a footbridge. The track plan included a passing loop and a short siding. The station remained operational throughout the life of the Jersey Railway and was closed when the line ceased operations in 1936.

== The site today ==
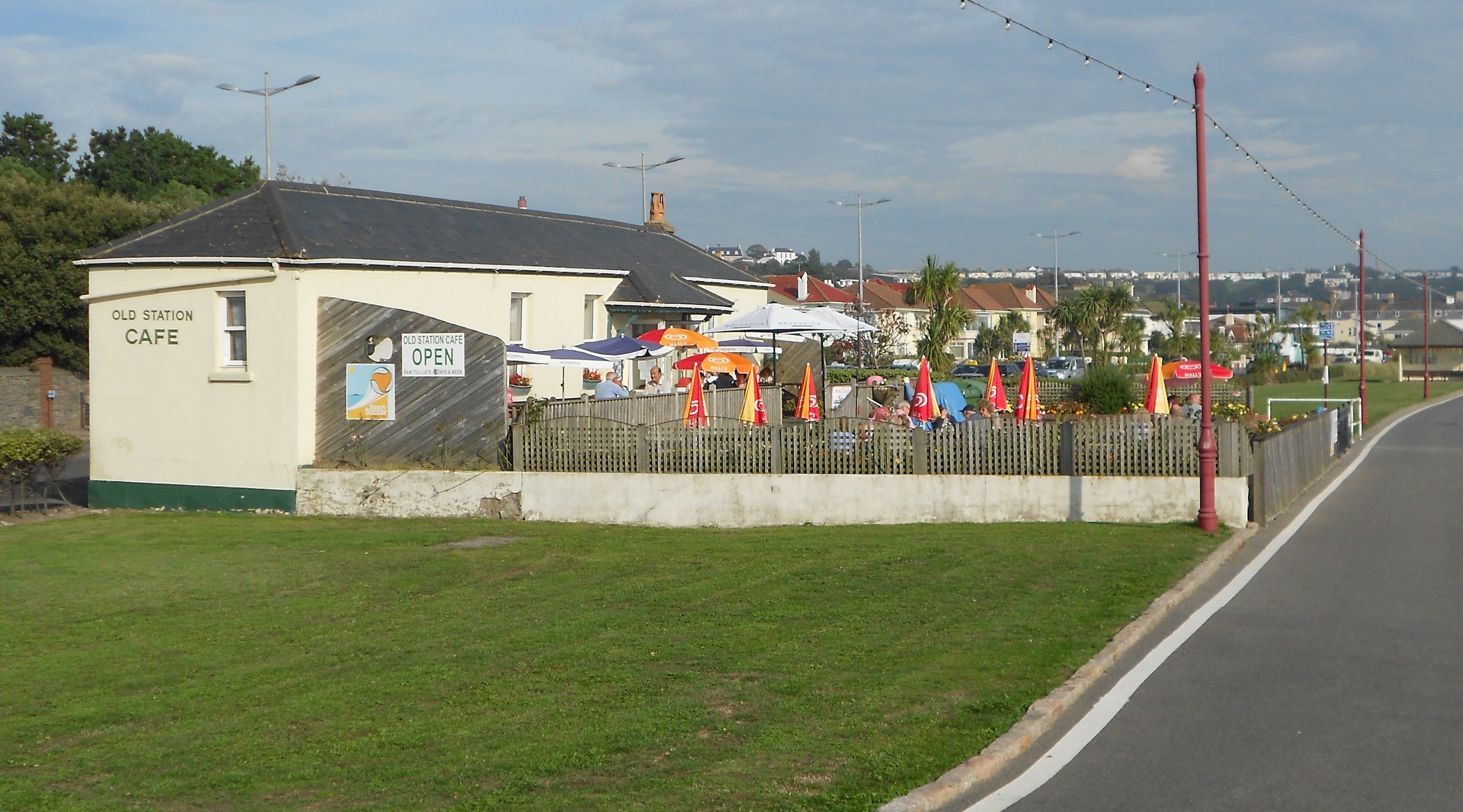
The former main railway station building, now preserved in contemporary use

The platforms, footbridge and the smaller station building (on the seaward platform) have all been demolished. However, the principal station building, located on the landward platform, has survived, and is currently in use as a café.

Part of the platform has been restored and extended using decking; the café is themed around its former railway use. The main building contains a small display of railway photographs and memorabilia, whilst replica station nameboards have been fixed to the exterior of the building.
