= Transport in Jersey =

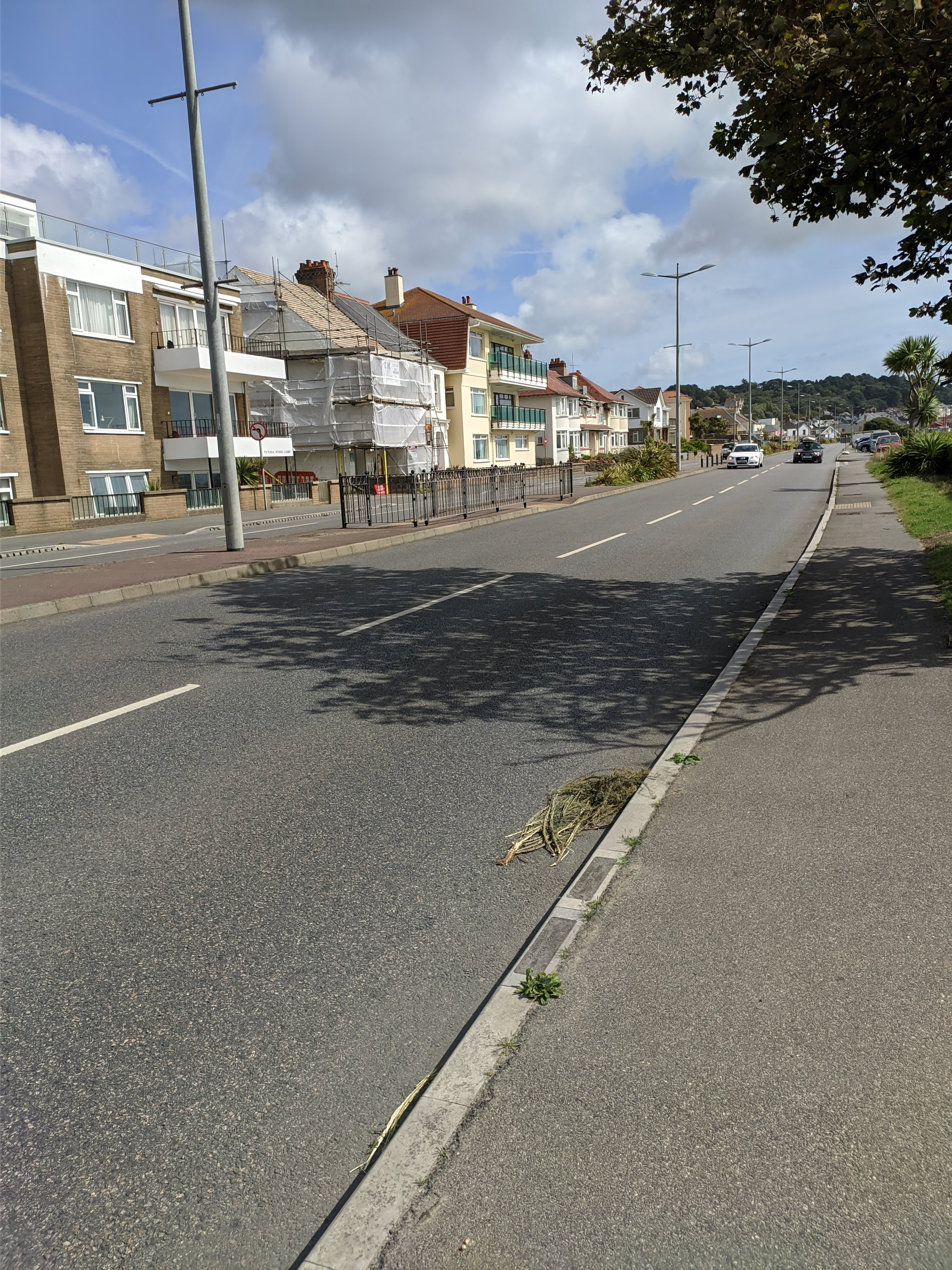
Victoria Avenue is the longest dual carriageway in Jersey. It links St Helier to Bel Royal.

Transport in Jersey is primarily through the motor vehicle. The island, which is the largest of the Channel Islands has 124,737 registered vehicles (2016). The island is committed to combatting climate change, having declared a climate emergency, and policy is focused on reducing dependence on the car. The island has a cycle network and bus service. The primary modes of transport for leaving the island are by air or sea.

== Road transport ==
Road transport is the primary form of both private and public transport in Jersey.

=== Highways ===
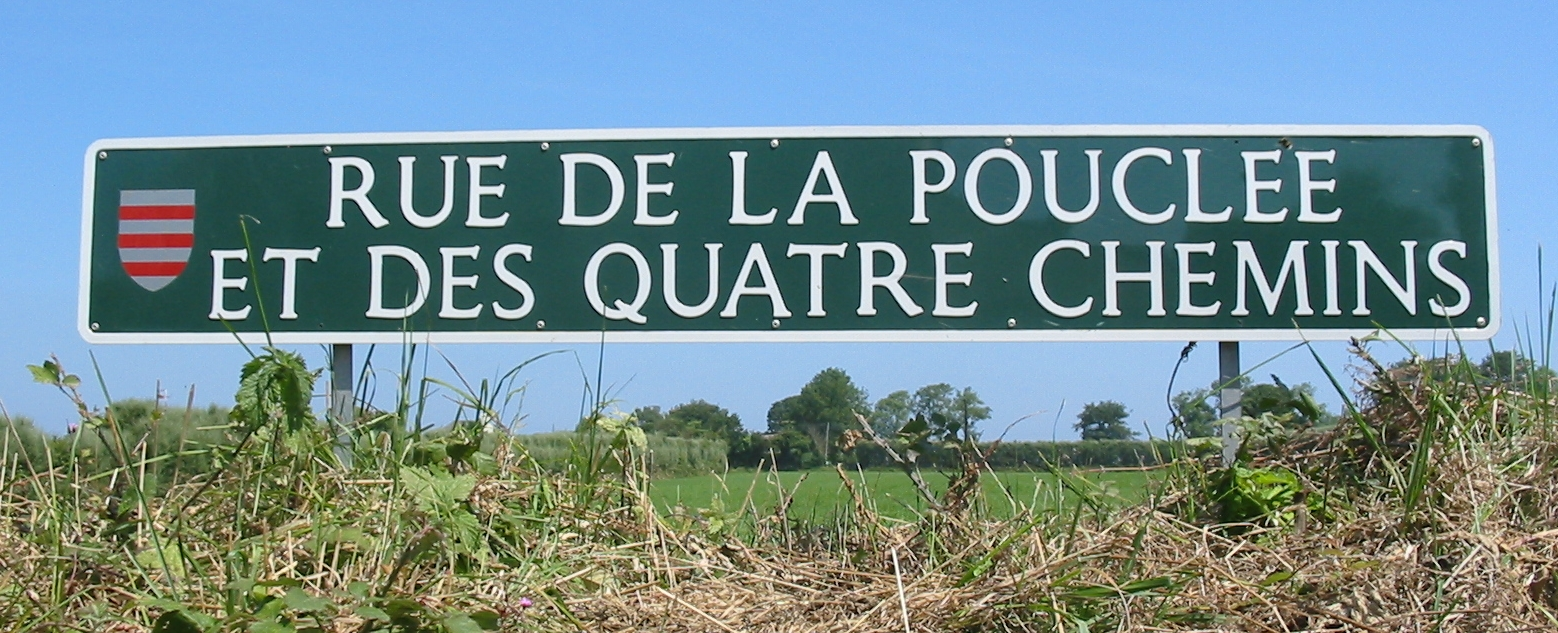
Road names in Jersey are generally in French

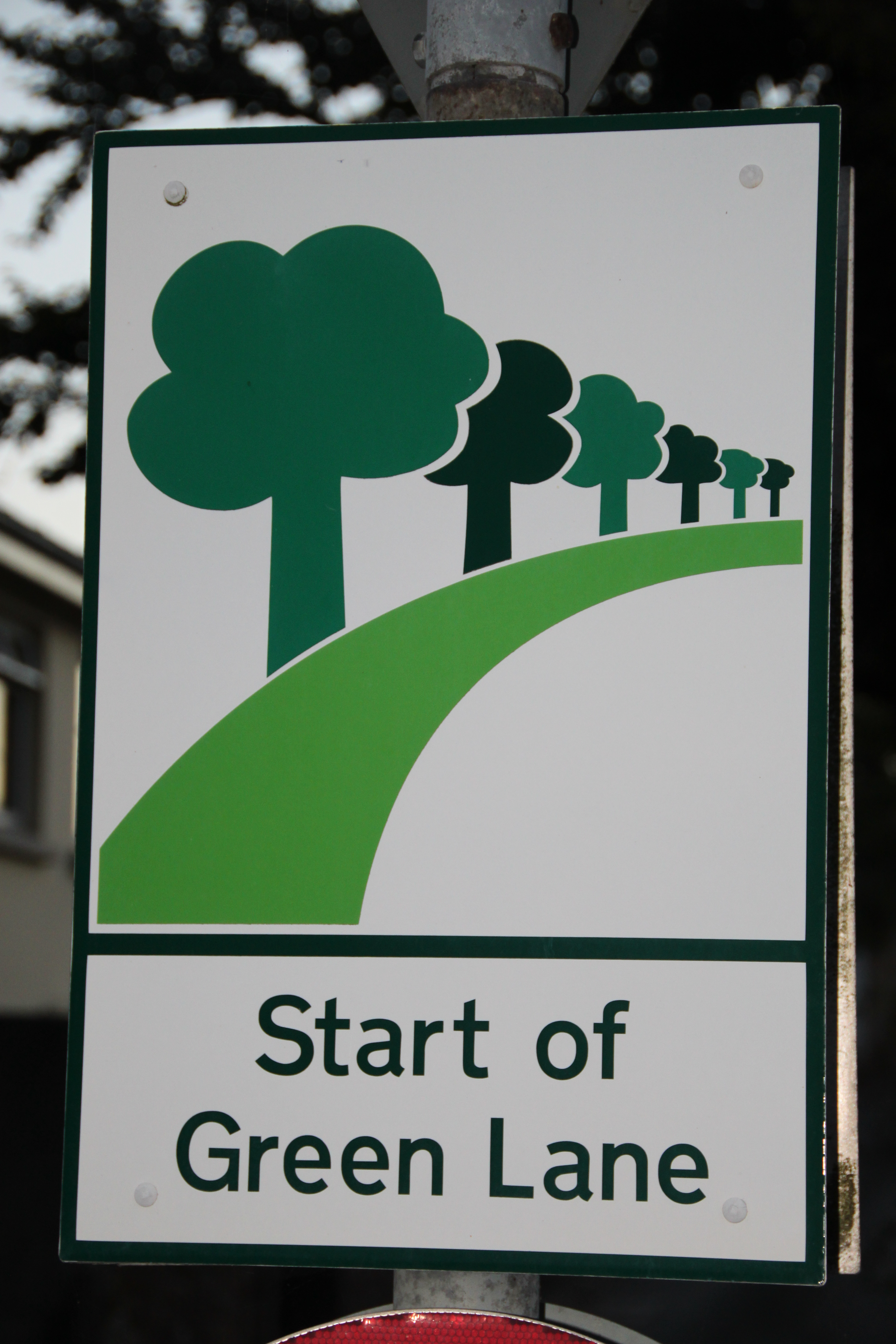
A green lane sign

Vehicles in Jersey drive on the left side of the road. The island has a default speed limit of 40 miles per hour (64 km/h) with slower limits on certain stretches of road, such as 20/30 mph (32/48 km/h) in built up areas and 15 mph (24 km/h) on roads designated as green lanes.

The island is home to longest dual carriageway in the Channel Islands, consisting of Victoria Avenue (A2), and the Esplanade/Route de la Liberation (A1). Roads in Jersey are often named in French or Jèrriais, except in St Helier, where they are often named in English.

Public highways are state-owned and managed by public highways authorities. Main roads are maintained by the Government of Jersey and funded through general taxation. By-roads (chemins vinciaux) are managed by the relevant parish through a roads committee. Roads inspectors are elected to report on roads in their vingtaine.

Roads in Jersey are classified using two systems. The first is the signposted system for classifying main roads, consisting of an "A", "B" and "C" system as used in Great Britain, Northern Ireland and the Isle of Man. These are often signed on directional signs, however some are inaccurate.

The second is a system used privately by the Government of Jersey to classify both main roads and by-roads. The system consists of Class 1, 2 and 3 roads (main roads) and Class 4 roads (by-roads). Class 1 roads include Victoria Avenue.

A visite du branchage is an inspection of roads to ensure property owners have complied with the laws against vegetation encroaching on the highway.

==== History ====
Until the 19th century, Jersey's highway system comprised narrow and muddy tracks connecting homes and fields to the churches, mills and beaches. Around the turn of the 18th century, the number of roads are described as "[holding] no Proportion with the Bigness [of the island]". The sides of the road, unlike in England had "great Bulwarks of Earth ... from 6 to 8, and sometimes 10 Foot high". At the time there were three types of road: Les Chemins du Roi, which, including the banks, were 16 feet wide; Les Chemins de 8 pieds, which were 12 feet wide; and Les Chemins de 4 pieds, which served only carriages on horseback.

In the early 19th century, the military roads were constructed (on occasion at gunpoint in the face of opposition from landowners) by the governor, General George Don, to link coastal fortifications with St. Helier harbour. These had an unexpected effect on agriculture once peace restored reliable trade links. Farmers in previously isolated valleys were able to swiftly transport crops grown in the island's microclimate to waiting ships and then on to the markets of London and Paris ahead of the competition. In conjunction with the later introduction of steamships and the development of the French and British railway systems, Jersey's agriculture was no longer as isolated as before.

==== A-roads ====
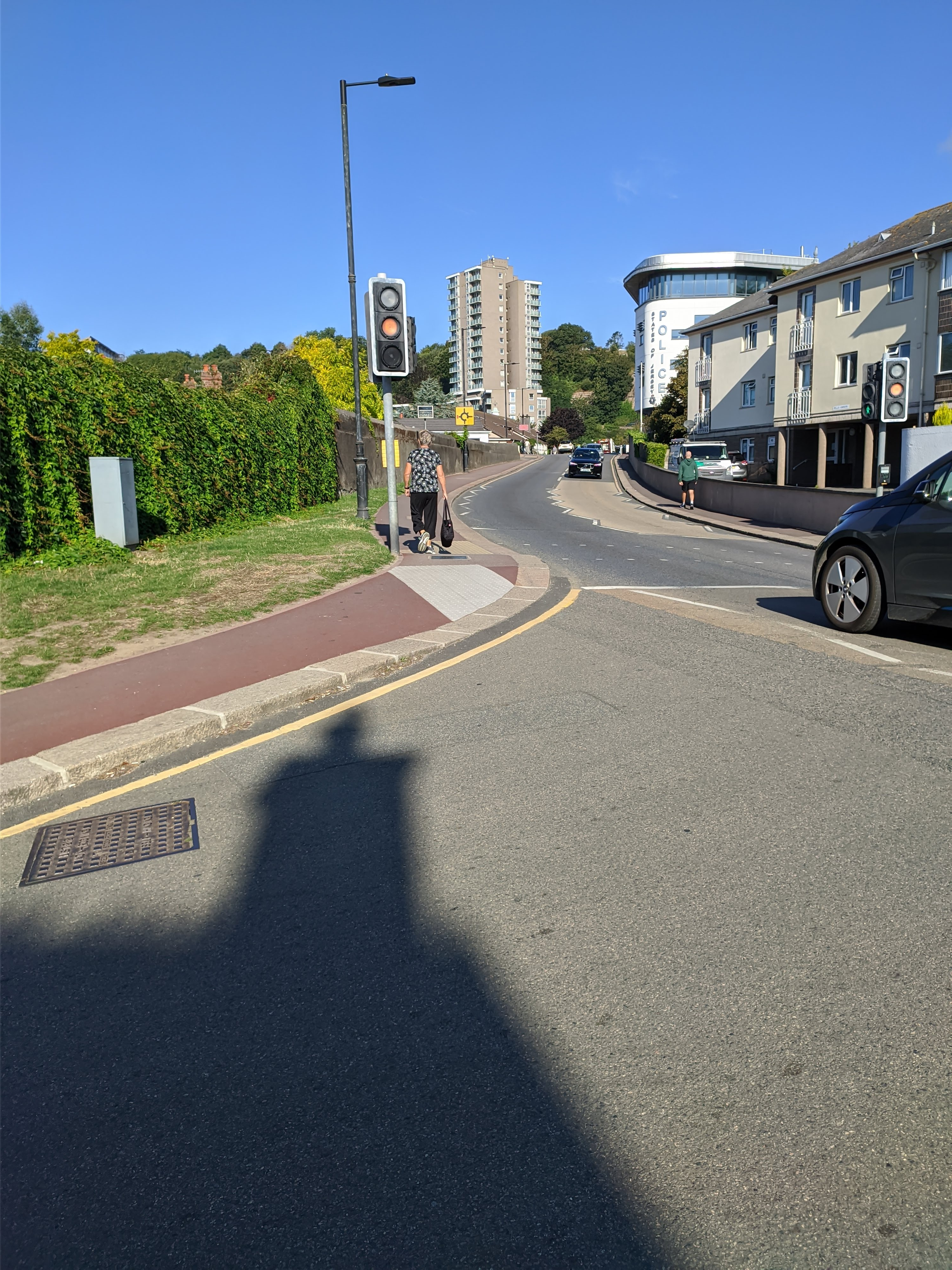
La Route du Fort in St Helier is the main route to the east of the island

- A1 St Helier to St Aubin road: La Route de la Liberation, Esplanade, La Route de Saint Aubin, La Route de la Haule
- A2 St Helier to Bel Royal road: Victoria Avenue
- A3 St Helier to Gorey road: Don Road, Georgetown Road, Bagot Road, Longueville Road, La Rue à Don
- A4 St Clement to Gorey coast road
- A5 St Clement to Gorey inner road
- A6 St Helier to St Martin road: Mont Millais, Bagatelle Road, La Grande Route de Saint Martin
- A7 St Helier to St Saviour road: La Motte Street, St Saviour's Road, St Saviour's Hill
- A8 St Helier to Trinity road: Trinity Road, Le Mont de la Trinité, La Route de la Trinité, La Rue des Croix, La Route d'Ebenezer
- A9 St Helier to St John road: Queens Road, La Grande Route de Saint Jean, La Route des Issues
- A10 St Lawrence main road: La Grande Route de Saint Laurent
- A11 St Peter's valley road: La Vallée de Saint Pierre
- A12 Beaumont to St Ouen road: La Route de Beaumont, La Grande Route de Saint Pierre, La Grande Route de Saint Ouen
- A13 St Aubin to Red Houses road: La Mont les Vaux, La Grande Route de Saint Brelade, La Route des Genets, La Route Orange
- A14: Rouge Bouillon
- A15: St Clement's Road
- A16: Commercial Buildings
- A17: La Route du Fort

==== Driving laws ====
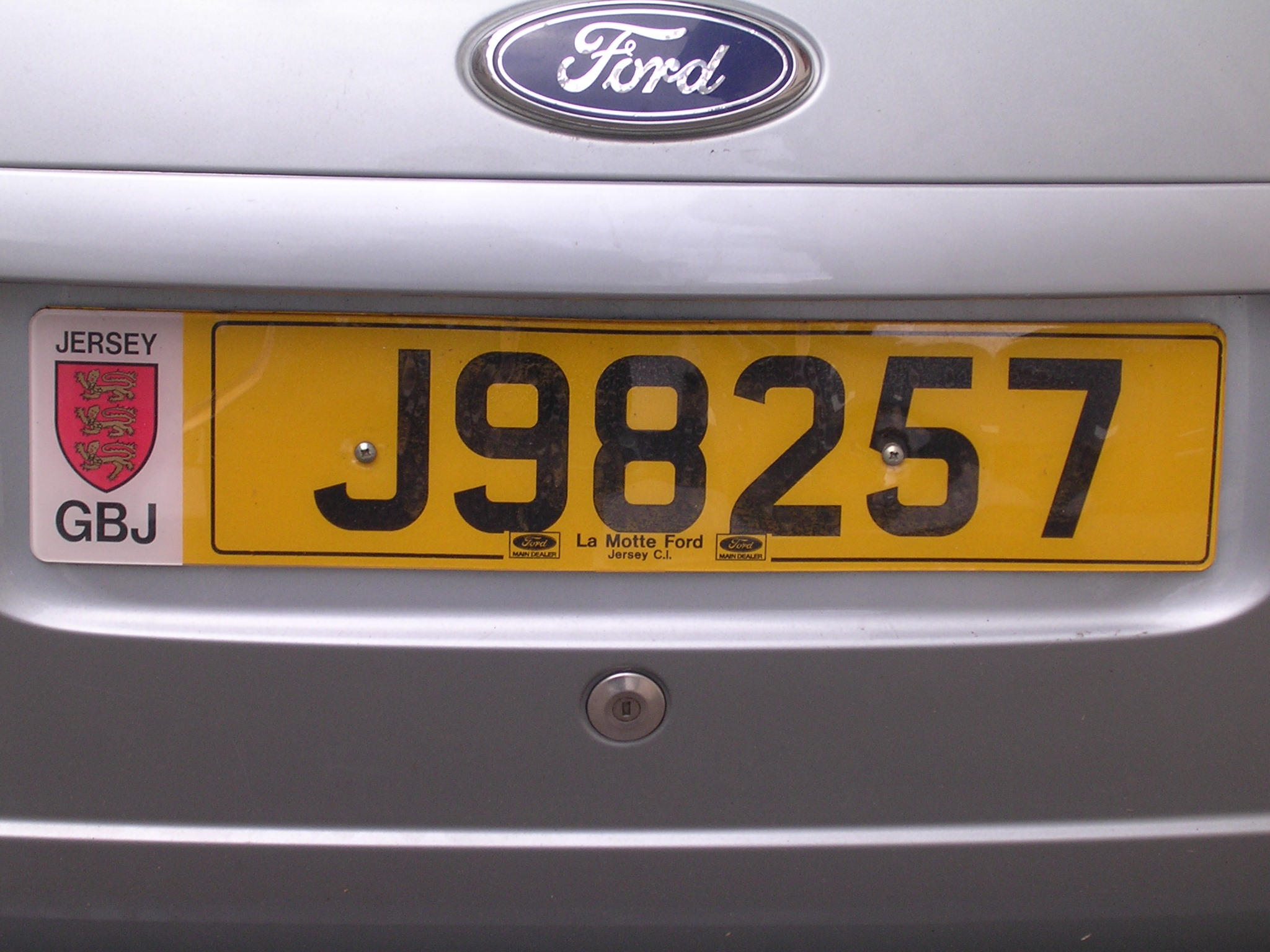
Jersey vehicle number plate

Driving laws in Jersey are the United Kingdom Highway Code, supplemented by the Jersey Highway Code.

Visitors wishing to drive must possess a Certificate of Insurance or an International Green Card, a valid Driving Licence or International Driving Permit (UK International Driving Permits are not valid). Photocopies are not acceptable. A nationality plate must be displayed on the back of visiting vehicles.

It is an offence to hold a mobile phone whilst driving a moving vehicle. It is not an offence to use a hands-free system. Where fitted, all passengers inside a vehicle must wear a seat belt at all times, regardless of whether they are sitting in the front or the rear.

Drink-driving is illegal in Jersey. Police use breathalyser tests during spot checks and a person is guilty if there is over 35 microgrammes of alcohol per 100 ml breath.

The penalties for drinking and driving in Jersey are up to £2,000 fine or six months in prison for the first offence plus unlimited disqualification of driving licence. It is an offence to drive whilst under the influence of drugs. Since July 2014 it has also been illegal to smoke in any vehicle carrying passengers under the age of 18.

=== Traffic calming ===
Over the years, a number of traffic calming schemes have been introduced around the island to get motorists to slow down. In 2016, a report in the JEP outlined a number of traffic calming schemes that were under consideration around the island.

Parish (in Jèrriais)	Traffic calming details
Saint Helier (Saint Hélyi)	All roads inside of the ring road have the speed limit set at 20 mph.
Grouville (Grouville)	There is a 20 mph zone in Gorey Village and near Grouville school. Furthermore, the Grouville Coast road was reduced
Saint Brelade (Saint Brélade)	In 2018, a review of all parish speed limits was conducted and most of the parish roads were reduced to 20 mph. There are 20 mph limits in the residential estates in the parish.
Saint Clement (Saint Cliément)	The Constable had tried to introduce a 20 mph limit outside the parish church but this did not succeed.
Saint John (Saint Jean)	A "french-style" traffic calming with a speed camera at each end of the village which is linked to a zebra crossing. If a car is speeding, the crossing would change to a red light. The Constable is opposed to 20 mph zones.
Saint Lawrence (Saint Louothains)	
Saint Martin (Saint Martîn)	A number of speed limit reductions were being considered, including a 20 mph zone outside the school and along the Gorey Coast Road.
Saint Mary (Sainte Mathie)	Roads around Grève de Lecq may be changed to 20 mph zones.
Saint Ouen (Saint Ouën)	As of 2016, Speed limits will remain "as they are".
Saint Peter (Saint Pièrre)	There is a 20 mph zone in the village centre.
Saint Saviour (Saint Saûveux)	New one-way schemes were considered including Les Varines and Rue de Beauvoir, including a new footpath along Les Varines.
Trinity (La Trinneté)	A 20 mph speed limit may be introduced in the village centre along Rue ès Picots.

=== Car sharing ===
Jersey has a shared electric car operator, EVie, that provides islandwide self-service electric car hire.

=== Cycling ===
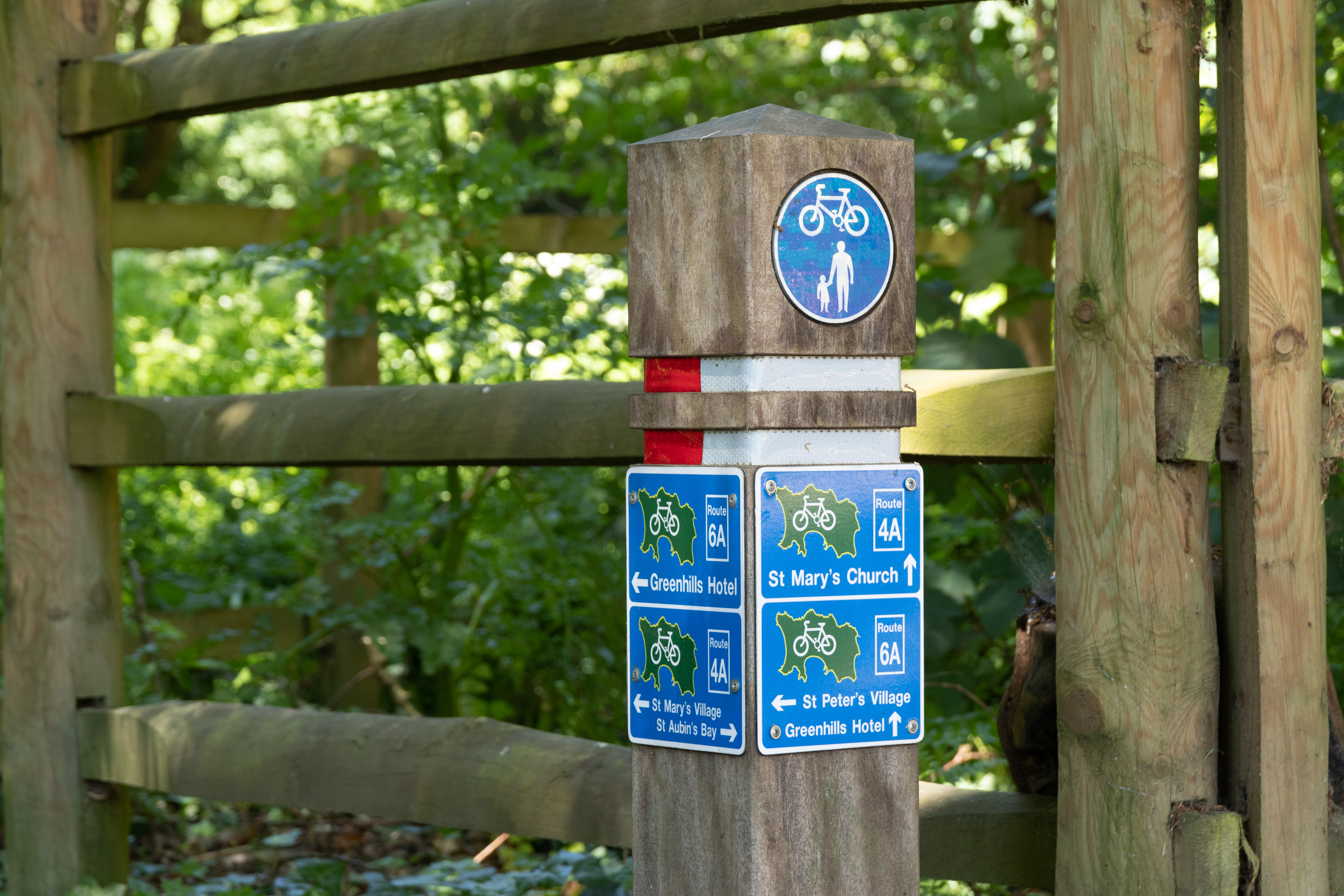
Jersey Cycle Route signs

Jersey has infrastructure dedicated to cyclists. Cycle infrastructure has been improving in the previous decade under the Sustainable Transport Policy.

The best developed cycle route is the route from St Helier to Corbière. The route consists of segregated cycle paths and shared pedestrian-cycle paths, including the St Aubin's Bay promenade and the Railway Walk. The connection from West Park to Havre des Pas was completed an upgraded after a ministerial decision in 2011. A branch of this route connects to St Peter's Village via Les Quennevais.

There is a segregated cycle-pedestrian path along St Peter's Valley, which connects pedestrians and cyclists from the green lane network in St Mary to roads near the St Aubin's Bay Promenade cycle route. It was opened in 2016.

Jersey has a network of signposted cycle routes. There are fifteen routes in total, such as route 1, which forms a loop around the island. Most of the routes are on quieter lanes and dedicated paths, however some of these routes are on busy main road with no dedicated infrastructure.

The Eastern Cycle Route network is a proposed network of cycle-safe routes in the eastern parishes of St Clement and Grouville. The first section from Gorey to La Ville-ès-Renauds in Grouville was opened in 2011.

There is a dedicated network of Green Lanes across the island, which have a 15 mph speed limit and where priority is afforded to cyclists.

=== Buses ===
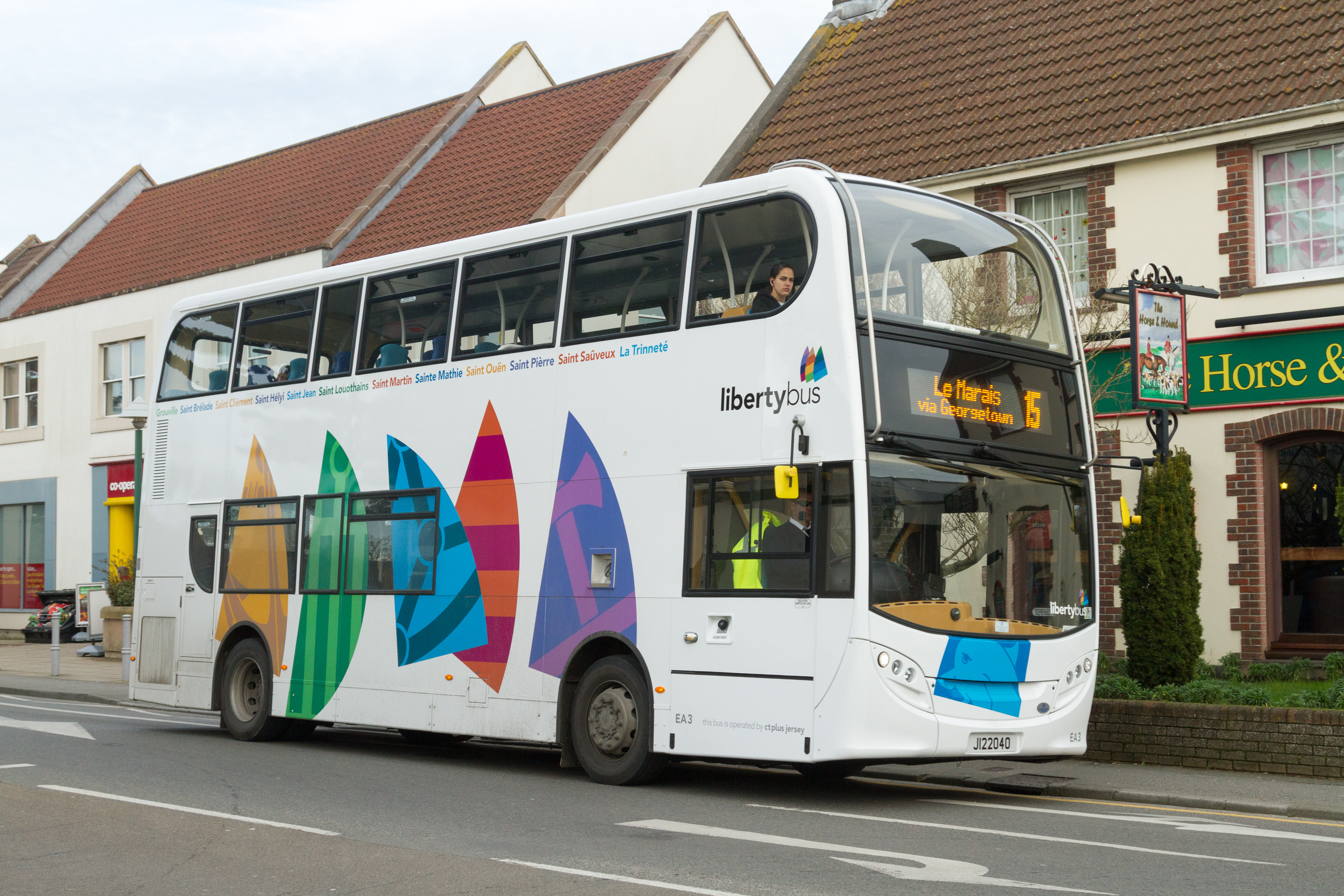
A double-decker bus in St. Brelade, Jersey

Buses started running on the island in the 1920s, and by the 1930s, competition from motor buses had rendered the railways unprofitable, with final closure coming in 1936 after a fire disaster (except for the later German reintroduction of rail during the military occupation).

Buses are operated by CT Plus Jersey, a local subsidiary of Kelsian Group, which was acquired in 2022 following the collapse of HCT Group. The service is currently branded as LibertyBus. All service routes radiate from the Liberation Station in St Helier.

=== Parking ===
Public parking in Jersey is controlled by time restrictions and payment.

A single-yellow line along the side of the carriageway indicates a "No waiting" restriction. There are no double-yellow lines in Jersey. Parking on yellow lines is liable to a fine.

Some on-street and off-street parking is paid parking. Payments operate using either Paycards or PayByPhone and is indicated with the Paycard Symbol. Paycards are a form of voucher payment. Paycards are purchased from various stores around the island and can be used by scratching the time of arrival on the relevant number of units.

Certain car parks, such as the Waterfront, Sand Street and Ports of Jersey Car Parks use automatic number plate recognition or ticket technology with a pay upon exit system.

Some parking is free to use, however, the parking is time-restricted and a Jersey parking disc must be displayed showing time of arrival.

There are four main residents’ and business parking zones within St Helier.

== Air transport ==
There is a single airport on the island, Jersey Airport, located in St. Peter. It has one runway and one terminal building and has direct flights throughout the year to many United Kingdom and International destinations, including nine daily flights to London.

Before the present airport opened in 1937, air transport was through seaplanes, which landed at West Park in St Helier. The first aeroplane to land in Jersey was the Sanchez Besa in August 1912. The first passenger flight was recorded as taking place 147 years earlier through air balloon.

== Rail transport ==
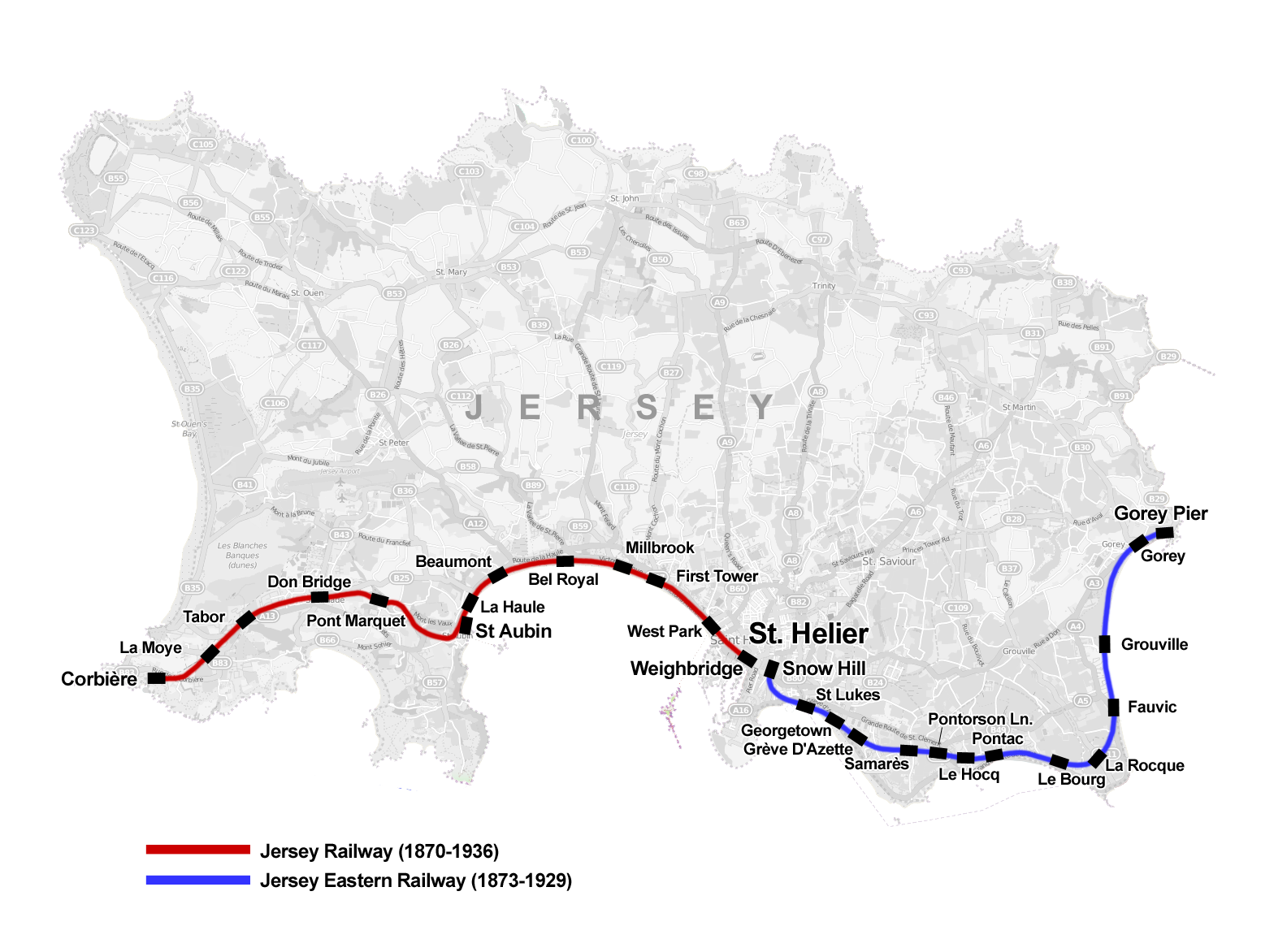
Map of the former railway lines of Jersey

Historically, there were public passenger railway services on the island, provided by two railway companies:

- The Jersey Railway (1870–1936)
- The Jersey Eastern Railway (1873–1929).

A third, freight-only, railway was opened in 1884.

The mostly coastal passenger lines operated out of St Helier and ran across the southern part of the island, reaching Gorey Harbour in the east and la Corbière in the west. There were two stations in St Helier: St Helier (Weighbridge) (JR) and St Helier (Snow Hill) (JER).

Running trains on Jersey economically was difficult due to the island's small size, steep inclines and hard granite rock, especially after motor buses started operating. Expanding the rail services was impracticable, whereas buses could operate more widely. Additionally, the St Helier to St Aubin portion of the Jersey Railway was costly to maintain, as it had been built on the edge of a beach, using exposed track beds and wooden viaducts to reduce initial construction costs.

In 1936, a fire destroyed much of St Aubin railway station, and also 16 carriages. The Jersey Railway was then closed, as the cost of replacing the destroyed assets was too high.

After closure of the two railways, most of their infrastructure was removed and little evidence of them now remains. A small number of former station buildings are still standing, including St Helier Weighbridge, which is now in use as the Liberty Wharf shopping centre, and St Aubin station, which is used today as the Parish Hall of Saint Brélade. Part of the former Jersey Railway line from St Aubin to Corbière has been converted into a rail trail for cyclists and walkers.

During the German military occupation 1940–1945, light railways were re-established by the Germans for the purpose of supplying coastal fortifications. A one-metre gauge line was laid down following the route of the former Jersey Railway from Saint Helier to La Corbière, with a branch line connecting the stone quarry at Ronez in Saint John. A 60 cm line ran along the west coast, and another was laid out heading east from Saint Helier to Gorey. The first line was opened in July 1942, the ceremony being disrupted by passively resisting Jersey spectators. The German railway infrastructure was dismantled after the Liberation in 1945.

Two railways have operated at the Pallot Heritage Steam Museum: a standard gauge heritage steam railway, and a narrow gauge pleasure line operated by steam-outline diesel motive power. As of 2025, these are not in operation.

In mid-2025, a company named Jersey Western Railway (JWR) proposed the creation of a new "affordable, comfortable and sustainable" railway service in Jersey, with a line from La Corbiere via St Aubin to St Helier, and a branch line to the airport. The £250m proposal generated controversy, with critics believing that a railway was unnecessary and the price tag too high.

== Sea transport ==
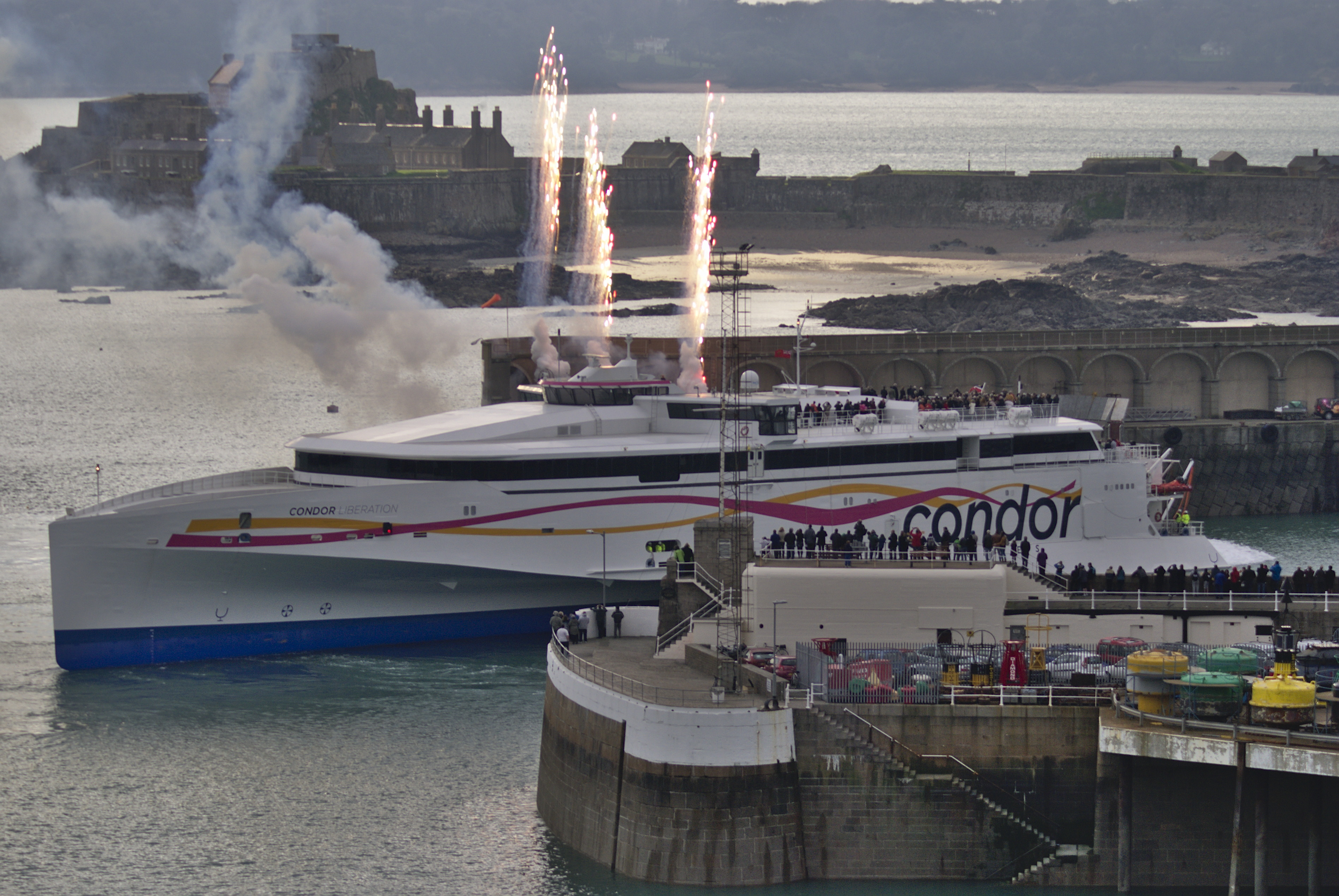
Condor Ferries fast craft trimaran Condor Liberation arriving at Saint Helier Harbour

=== History ===
An important growth for St Helier in the early 19th century was the construction of the harbour. Previously, ships coming into the town had only a small jetty at the site now called the English Harbour and the French Harbour. The Chamber of Commerce urged the States to build a new harbour, but the States refused, so the Chamber took it into their own hands and repaired and upgraded the harbour in 1790. A new breakwater was constructed to shelter the jetty and harbours. In 1814, the merchants constructed the roads now known as Commercial Buildings and Le Quai des Marchands to connect the harbours to the town and in 1832 construction was finished on the Esplanade and its sea wall. A rapid expansion in shipping led the States in 1837 to order the construction of two new piers: the Victoria and Albert Piers.

=== Seaports and harbours ===
Saint Helier Harbour is the island's main port, others include Gorey, Saint Aubin, La Rocque, and Bonne Nuit. It is 33.6 miles (54.1 km) distant from Granville, Manche, 142.9 miles (230.0 km) from Southampton, 131.3 miles (211.3 km) from Poole, and 22.9 miles (36.9 km) from St Malo.

On 20 August 2013, Huelin-Renouf, which had operated a "lift-on lift-off" container service for 80 years between the Port of Southampton and the Port of Jersey, ceased trading. Senator Alan Maclean, a Jersey politician had previously tried to save the 90-odd jobs furnished by the company to no avail. On 20 September, it was announced that Channel Island Lines would continue this service, and would purchase the MV Huelin Dispatch from Associated British Ports who in turn had purchased them from the receiver in the bankruptcy. The new operator was to be funded by Rockayne Limited, a closely held association of Jersey businesspeople. Channel Island Lines closed in 2020.

=== Operations ===
DFDS Seaways operate scheduled freight and passenger services to Poole a coastal town and seaport on the south coast of Dorset, and Portsmouth both in England, as well as St Malo in France. Until spring 2025, services were previously operated by Condor Ferries, who became main operator for UK sailings for the island, following the closure of British Channel Island Ferries in 1994, and the privatisation of Sealink in 1984.

Brittany Ferries operate a limited inter-island service to and from Guernsey.

Passenger-only access to France is provided by Manche-Iles Express ferry service, to either Barneville-Carteret, Granville or Dielette.

Islands Unlimited operates a daily passenger only service Guernsey

== See also ==
- Bailiwick of Jersey
- List of shipwrecks in the Channel Islands
