= A3 road (Jersey) =

A3

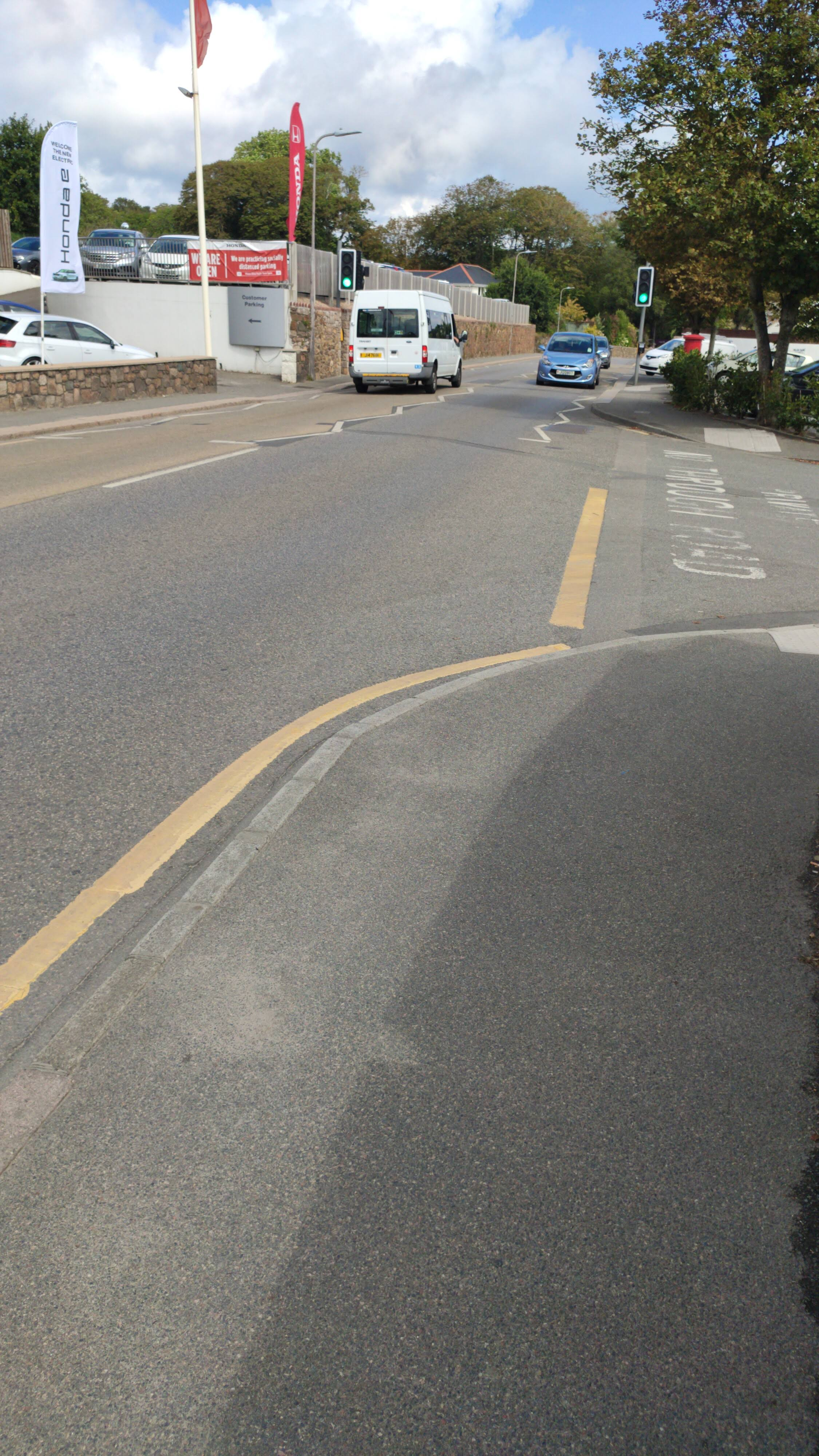

Major junctions
- From: A1 in St Helier
- A6 at Howard Davis Park A17 at Georgetown A4 at La Ville ès Renauds
- To: B28 at Gorey Pier

Location
- Country: United Kingdom
- Crown dependency: Jersey
- Parishes: St Helier St Saviour Grouville St Martin

Road network
- Transport in Jersey

The A3 is a major road in Jersey connecting Saint Helier and Gorey, passing through Grouville and Longueville.

== History ==
Previously, traffic could travel along the whole route in the direction of town, with the exception of Don Road along the east of Howard Davis Park. However, after the opening of the Tunnel in the 1960s, there was a desire in the States to reduce the amount of traffic travelling through the town centre. In the 1986 Island Plan, a project was identified to pedestrianise part of La Colomberie, with traffic diverted onto Grenville Street, to encourage more traffic to use the tunnel as the East-West route.

== Route ==
The modern route is practicably in three parts.

=== Grenville Street to the Weighbridge ===
The first part of the route runs from Grenville Street to Weighbridge along a one-way single-lane road. It meets junctions with the A7 and the B77. It runs past the States Building and the Town Church. The road meets a junction with the A4, before running between Liberation Square and the Weighbridge.

=== La Colomberie ===
Part of the A3 runs along La Colomberie between Howard Davis Park and B84. This road has been one-way since the 1950s. The remainder of La Colomberie was pedestrianised in the 1990s, interrupting the traffic flow from the East to the Town Centre. Now traffic must use a round-about route via the B84 and the B79.

=== St Helier to Gorey ===
The main part of the route runs from Howard Davis Park along a section of one-way road called Don Road. The road meets a busy junction at Georgetown (where seven roads meet in close proximity). The road runs through Longueville over a hill to Grouville Church and further onto Gorey.
