= A1 road (Jersey) =

Road in Jersey

A1
- La Route de la Libération; Esplanade; St Aubin's Road; La Route de la Haule
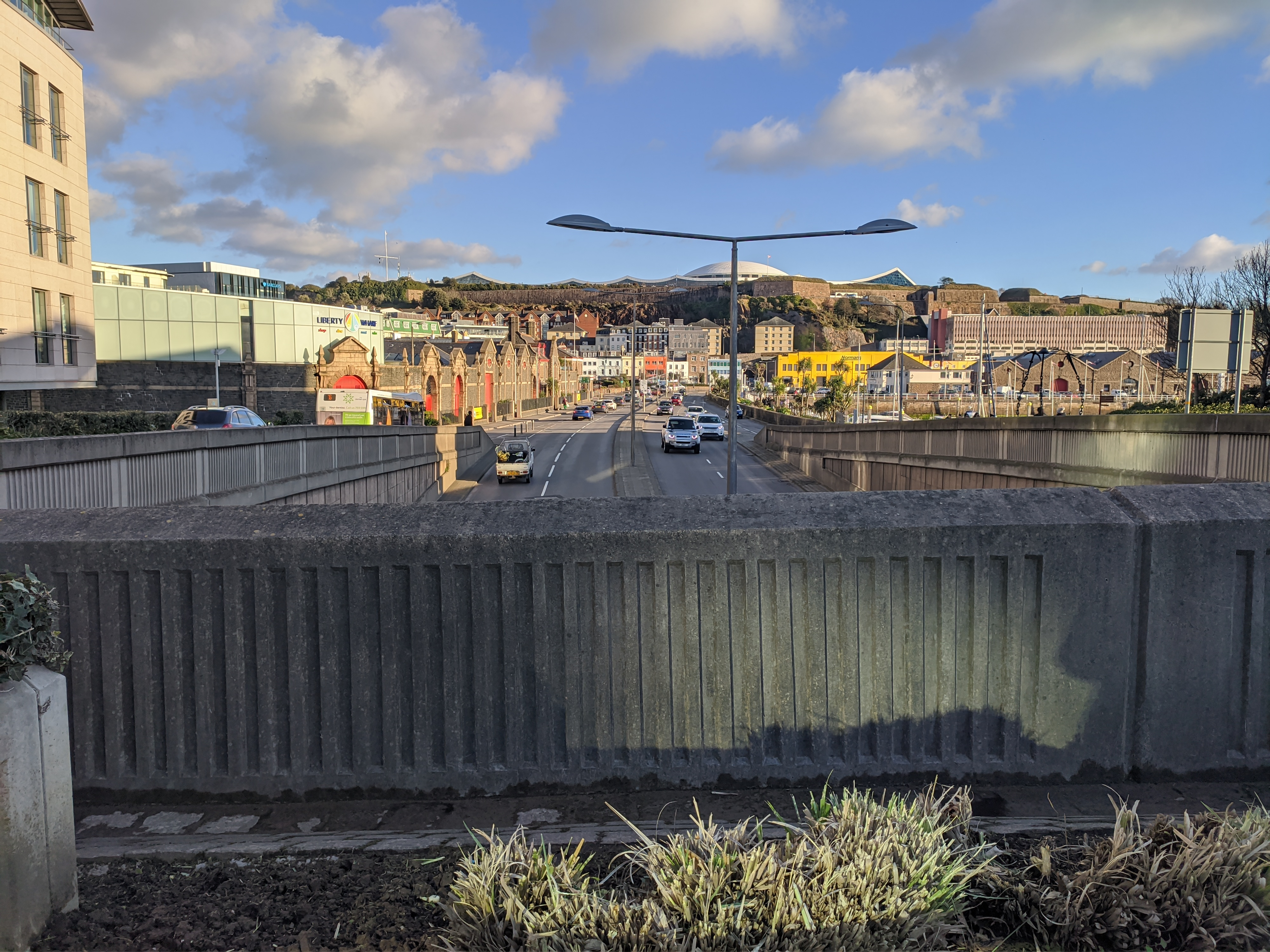
- A1 in Saint Helier

Major junctions
- From: St Helier
- A17 The Tunnel; A16 Commercial Buildings; B92 Castle Street; A2 Victoria Avenue; B87 St Aubin's Road; B27 Mont Cochon; A10 Mont Felard; A11 St Peter's Valley; B25 Mont aux Roux; A13 Mont les Vaux
- To: St Aubin

Location
- Country: United Kingdom
- Crown dependency: Jersey
- Parishes: St Helier, St Lawrence, St Peter, St Brelade

Road network
- Transport in Jersey

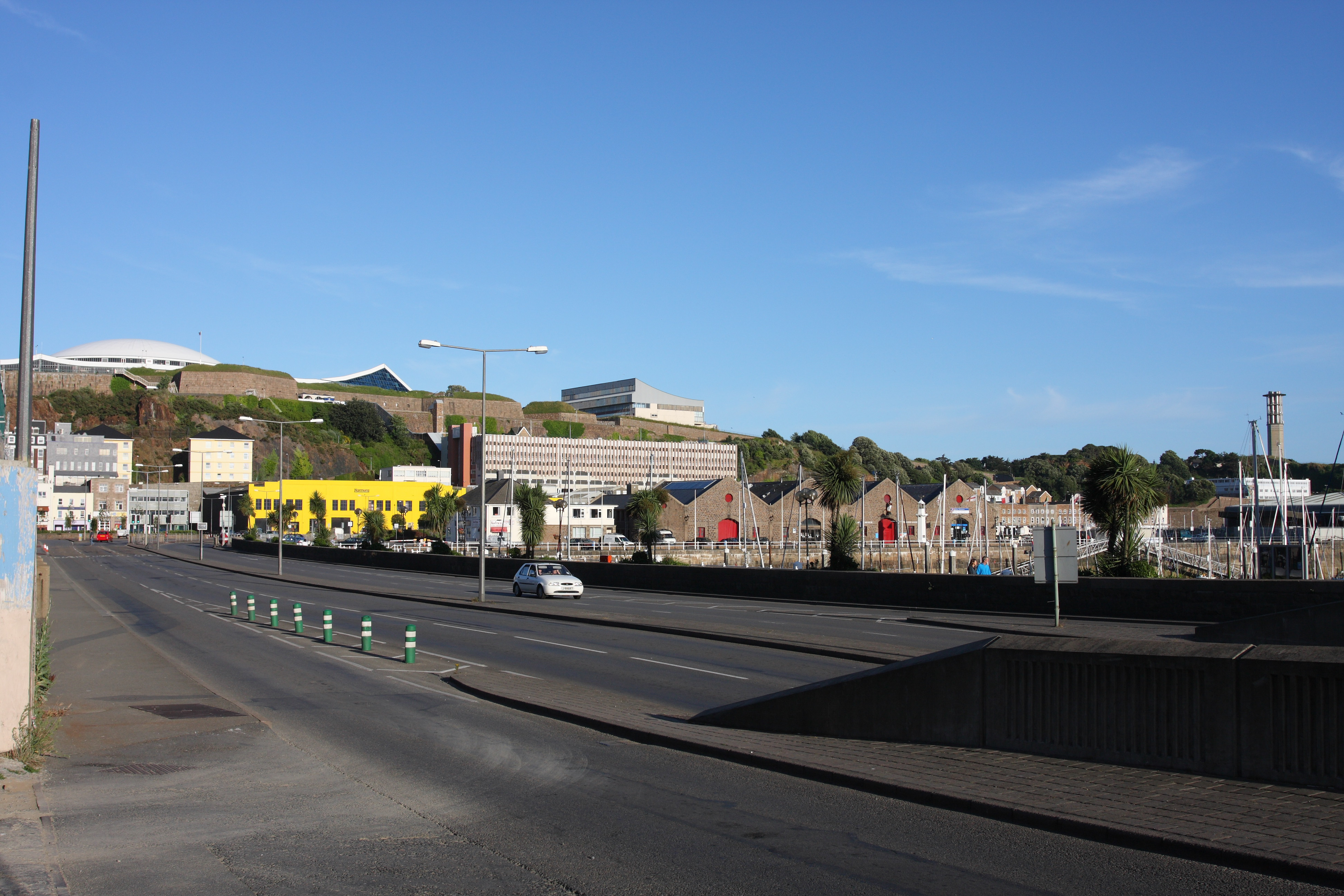
La Route de la Libération forms part of the A1 in St. Helier

The A1 road in Jersey is a major route on the south of the island and links St. Helier with St. Aubin in the parish of St Brelade.

== History ==
The A1 road was originally classified in the 1950s, at the same time as all the other A roads in Jersey. Before the West of Albert Pier reclamation project in the 1990s, the A1 used to travel along the entire length of the Esplanade Road as a dual carriageway, then form a gyratory around the former abattoir building.

== Route ==
The A1 begins travelling westbound at Liberation Square in St Helier, where traffic running from the East through the tunnel joins with traffic from the town centre (A3) and the Coast road (A16) which connects to the La Collette industrial area. It meets a grade-separated roundabout at a junction with the B92. It continues through the southern edge of town (forming part of the town's ring road). It reaches a junction with the A9 Gloucester Street (which is one-way towards the A1 - to access the A9, traffic must use the B87). After this the road meets a large, busy junction with the A2. Traffic must turn right off the road to continue onto the A1. The A1 now meets a junction with the B87 (down which the St Helier Ring Road continues). A1 traffic now leaves the town along a short stretch of road before arriving in the Ville ès Nouaux (First Tower). The A1 continues to head toward the St Helier border, meeting junctions with the B27 and the A10.

At the Bel Royal junction, most traffic for the A1 (except buses) cannot continue on the A1 due to a bus gate. The previous route instead continues right as the A11 into St. Peter's Valley. Traffic must instead turn off after its junction with the A10 to use the A2, which becomes the A1 after Bel Royal.

The road continues to the Beaumont filter-in-turn, where traffic can either continue along the A1 to St Aubin and eventually St Brelade or mount Beaumont Hill to reach St Peter.

Much of the middle section of the route runs parallel with the nearby coastal A2 road (Victoria Avenue).

== See also ==
- Roads in Jersey
