= Filter in turn =

Type of traffic junction

The Filter in turn sign is similar to a Give Way sign, but with the text 'Filter in turn' instead.

A filter in turn is a type of traffic junction found in the Channel Islands, made to require vehicles to take turns to go through the junction. Filter in turn junctions take slightly different forms across the island.

Due to a signage change in Jersey, both islands now use the same sign to indicate a filter in turn.

== In the Channel Islands ==
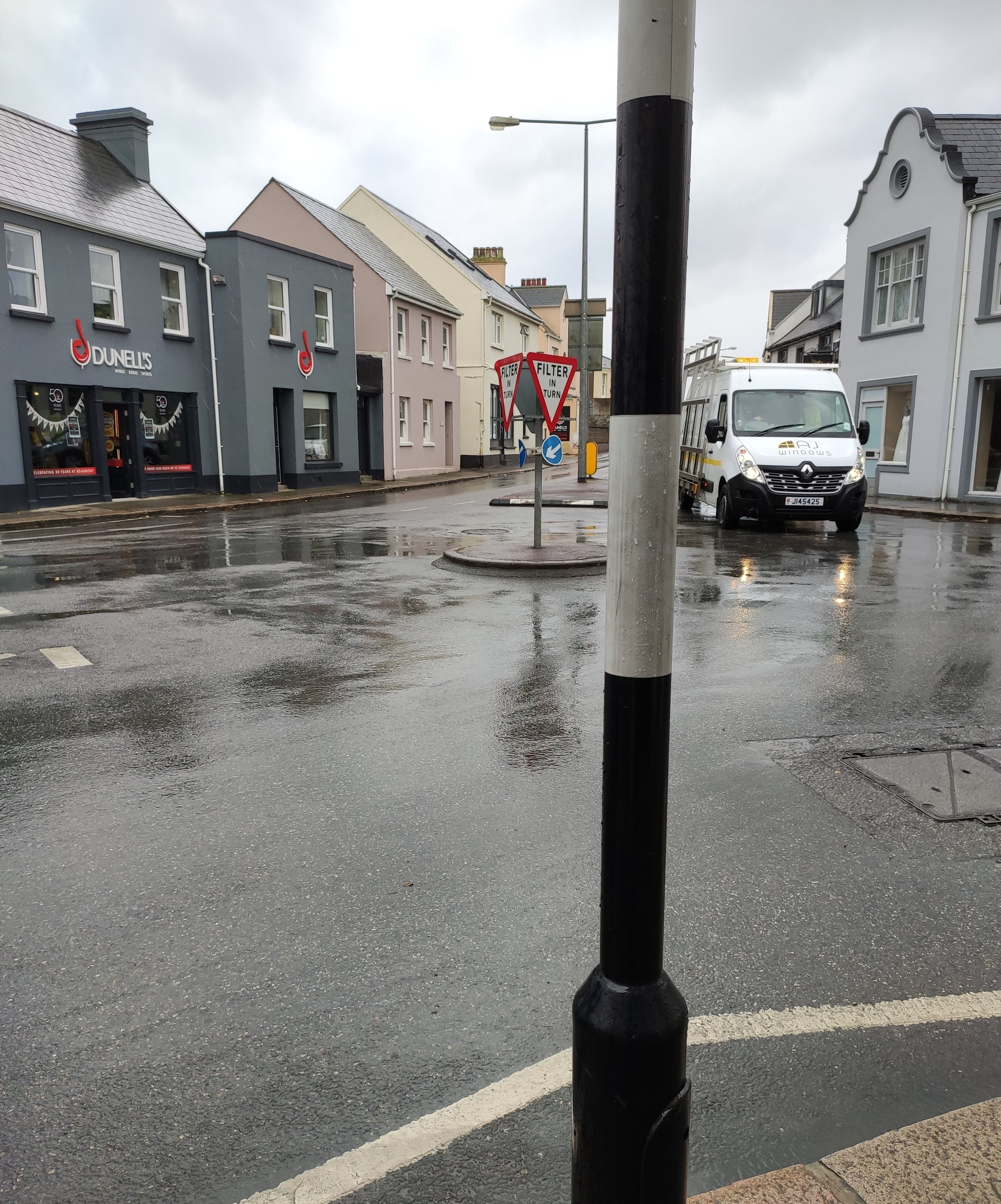
Filter in turn system in Beaumont, Jersey

Three of the junctions are on the St Helier ring road and were introduced in 2012. They are effectively merge in turn junctions.

Filter in turns are located at the end of Victoria Avenue and at St Helier.

Guernsey often uses box junctions at filter in turns to ensure traffic filtering does not block traffic at peak times. There is also a filter in turn at the Chainhouse crossroads.

Some tourists have problems dealing with these junctions in the locale.

== Elsewhere ==
While a formal filter-in-turn road rule does not exist elsewhere, road users in other countries may spontaneously adopt a similar arrangement from time to time at merge junctions where traffic is slow-moving and roughly equally heavy on both roads, even where one road has legal priority. A similar junction, known as an all-way stop, is common in North America and South Africa, where the vehicle that stops first proceeds first. In Mexico, some intersections require vehicles to take turns to proceed. Depending on the region, they are known as either "uno y uno", "ceda el paso a un vehiculo", "X altos" (where X is the number of approaches), or "alto de cortesia". Unlike an all-way stop, vehicles are not always required to make a complete stop. Vehicles generally have to give way to pedestrians.
