= A17 road (Jersey) =

Road in Jersey, Channel Islands

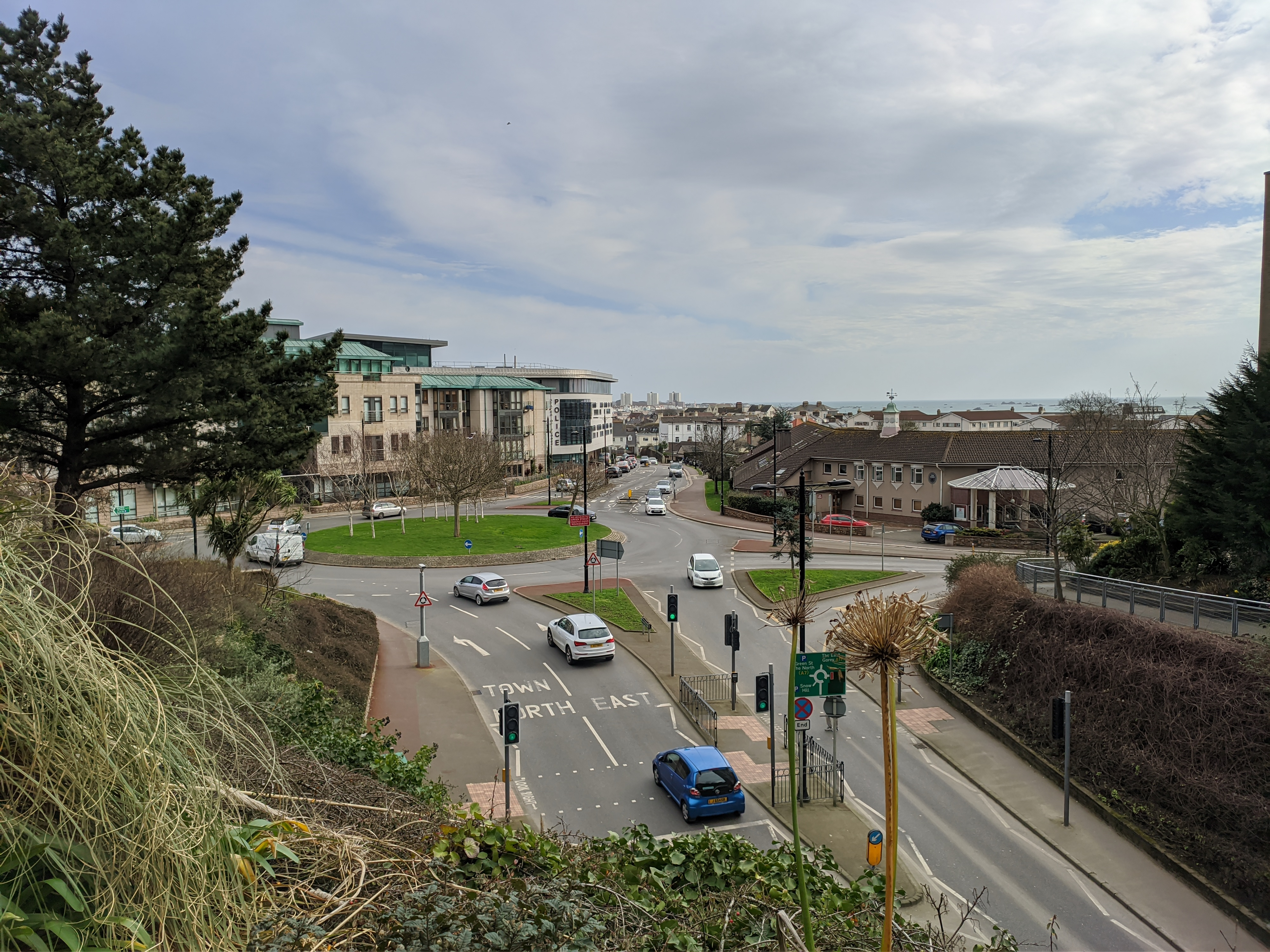
Green Street Roundabout

The A17 road, more commonly known as La Route du Fort, is a road in Jersey, Channel Islands.

The road connects Weighbridge Place in St Helier to Georgetown in St Saviour. It includes a tunnel under Mont de la Ville (Fort Regent) and part of the former Jersey Eastern Railway. It is a key link between the east of the island and the west of the island as it connects the main roads in the east to Victoria Avenue.

The most well known part of the road is the single-bore tunnel under Fort Regent. It opened on 25 February 1970 after seven years of construction. The cost was £441,550, including £110,000 land acquisition. Since construction there have been a number of improvements to the tunnel, including being resurfaced in 2012. The remainder of the road (opened in 1967) linked Green Street and Roseville Street for the first time and replaced older roads known as Peel Street and Plaisance Road.
