= Gorey, Jersey =

Coordinates: 49.199887°N 2.021304°W

Gorey
- Village
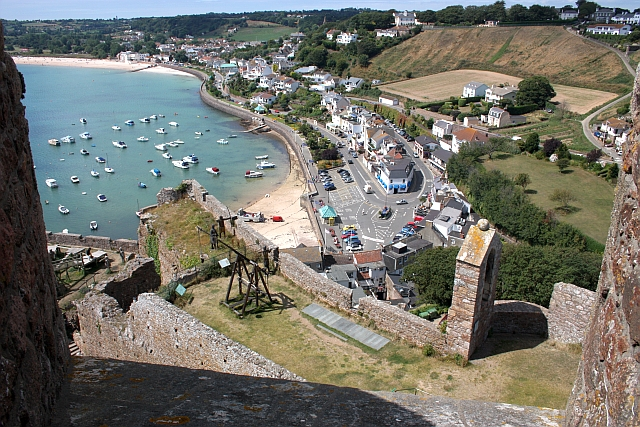
- A view of Gorey from Mont Orgueil

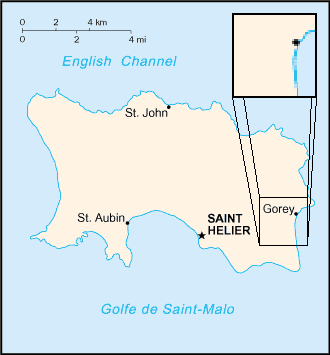
- Map of Jersey zoomed on Gorey.
- Crown Dependency: Jersey, Channel Islands
- Time zone: GMT
  - Summer (DST): UTC+01

Gorey (French: Gouray; Jèrriais: Gouôrray) is a village in the parishes of St Martin and Grouville, vingtaines of Faldouet and Marais, on the east coast of Jersey. The harbour is one of the three main harbours of the island, and is located in St Martin. The main centre of the village is located at Gorey Pier near Mont Orgueil Castle, a 13th-century fortification, in St Martin, while there is a small community with a few shops and restaurants. The church in the village is known as Gouray Church.

== History ==
Its position as the closest strategic mainland point to the Cotentin Peninsula has meant that it has a history of fortification going back at least to the Iron Age. After the division of the Duchy of Normandy in 1204 the strategic location of the harbour led to the construction of the castle of Mont Orgueil to protect the island against the French, also serving as residence for Governors of Jersey until the late 16th century when Elizabeth Castle was constructed off Saint Helier. The castle was anciently called Gouray Castle, but Mont Orgueil is a more recent name (in official use by the late 17th century).

There is a significant oyster bed off the coast of Gorey. In the early 19th century, at least 2,000 men were employed in the industry at Gorey, and a number of cottages were built in the village to accommodate the new English residents. This also led to the construction of Gouray Church to provide English services for the residents (most of the Anglican services on the island at the time were delivered in French).^{:236}

In 2010, it was announced that the Harbour Master's house would be sold, and the proceeds used to carry out restoration work to Gorey Pier. In the same year, plans were submitted for 52 homes on the Jersey Pottery site.

== Local economy ==
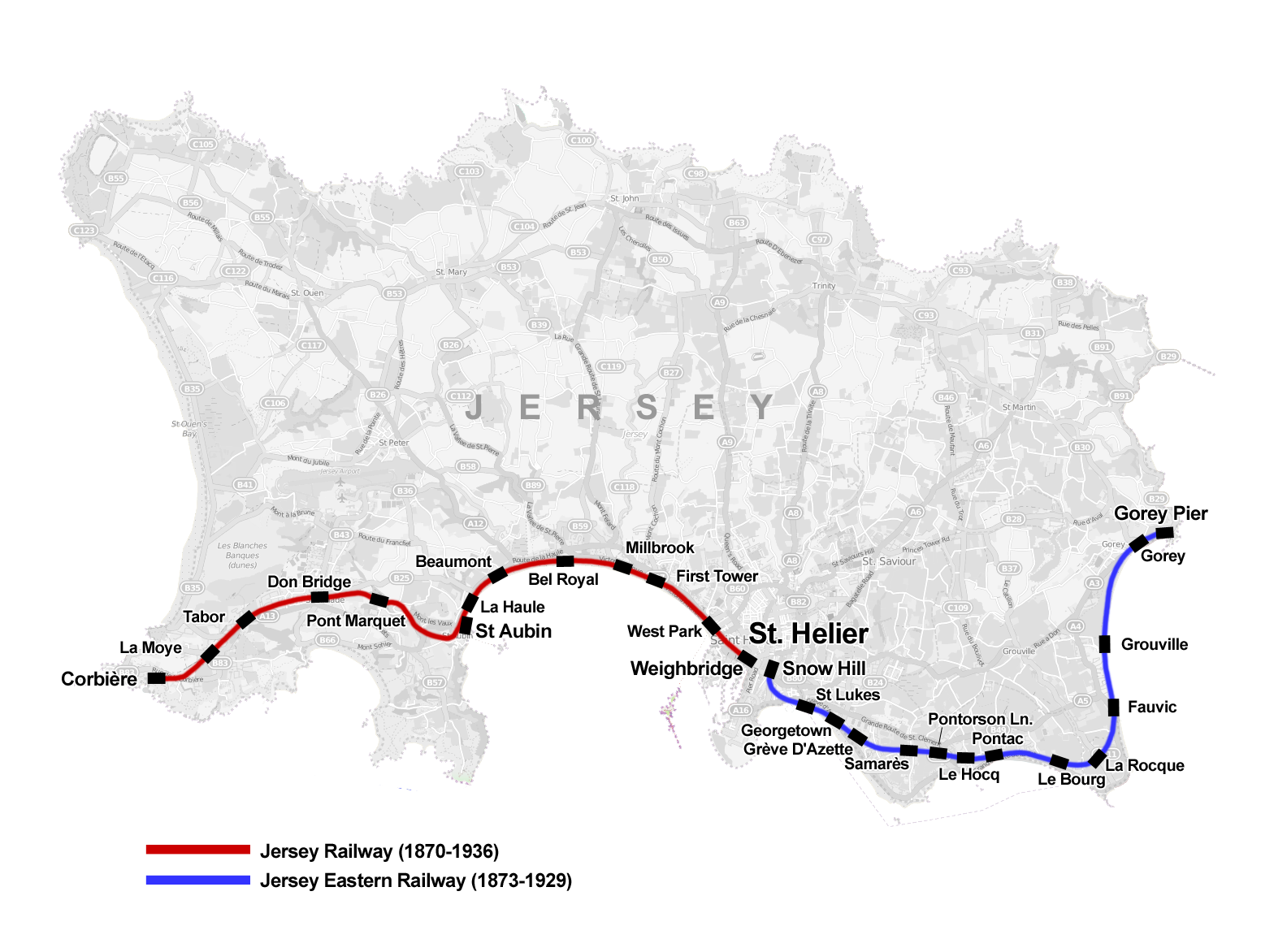
The Eastern Railway formerly terminated at Gorey Pier.

The pier below the castle has been the site of the annual Fête de la Mer (seafood gastronomic festival) until 2010, and also contains an interpretation centre exhibiting the history and environment of the area. The annual Gorey Fête in August is one of the largest such events in Jersey.

There are a number of hotels, shops, restaurants, and bars. Many of these facilities are located along the pier, and are used by tourists and locals.

=== Transport ===
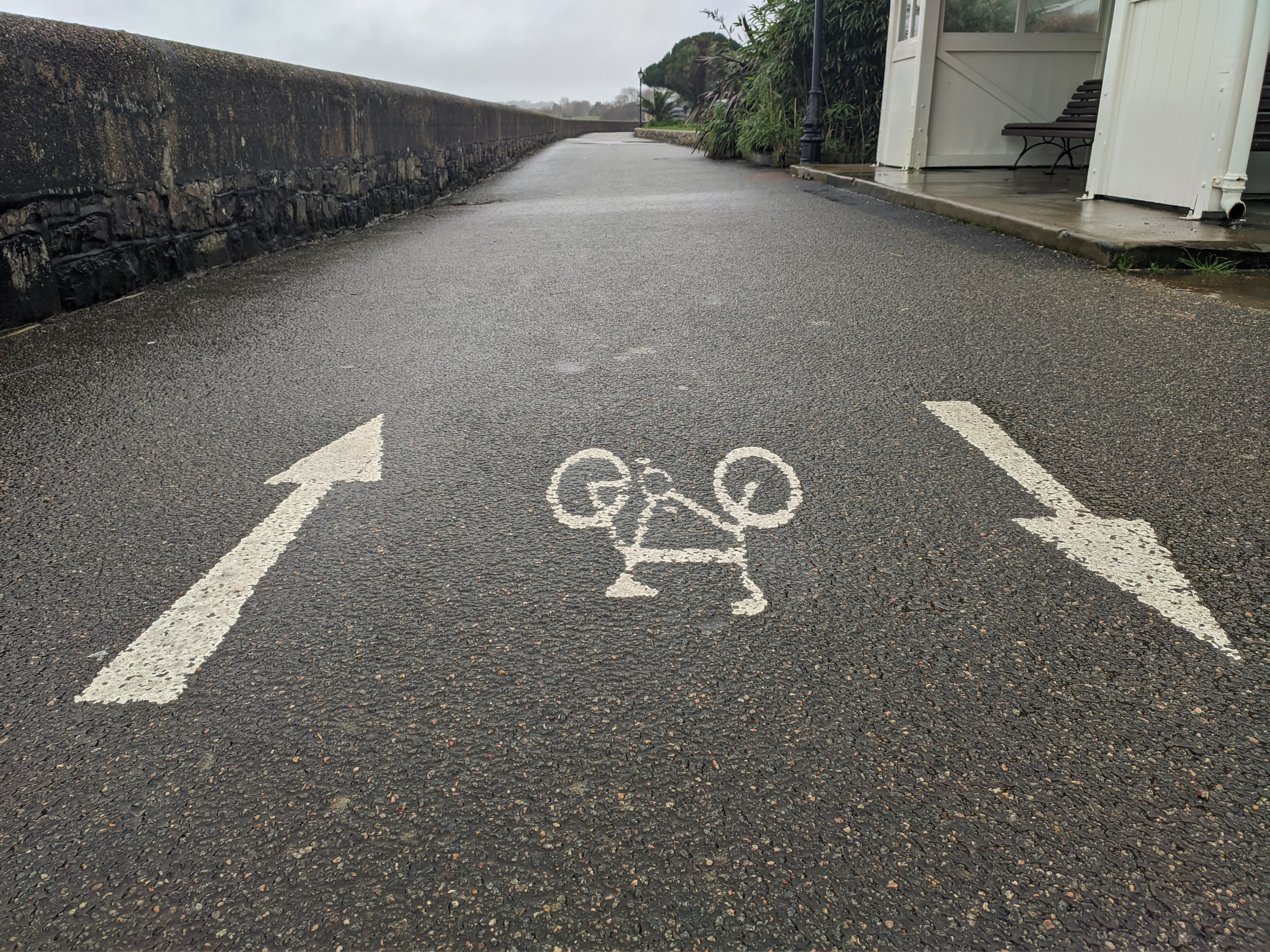
Part of the Eastern Cycle Network

Gorey Pier is the eastern terminus of the A3 La Rue à Don, which is the main road linking the village to Grouville Church and to St Helier. It was formerly the terminus for the Jersey Eastern Railway.

As part of the Eastern Cycle Network plans, Gorey will be connected to St Helier with a direct off-main road cycle route. A cycle path was constructed along the side of La Rue à Don in Gorey in 2011 in a move to link the village to the local primary school. Later on, the cycle lane was extended south along the Royal Golf Course (at a cost of £190,000) and north to connect to Gorey Pier along the coast.

== Notable buildings ==
Buildings of note in Gorey include Mont Orgueil castle, and Gouray Church, an Anglican church, which serves the village and surrounding district.

== Gallery ==
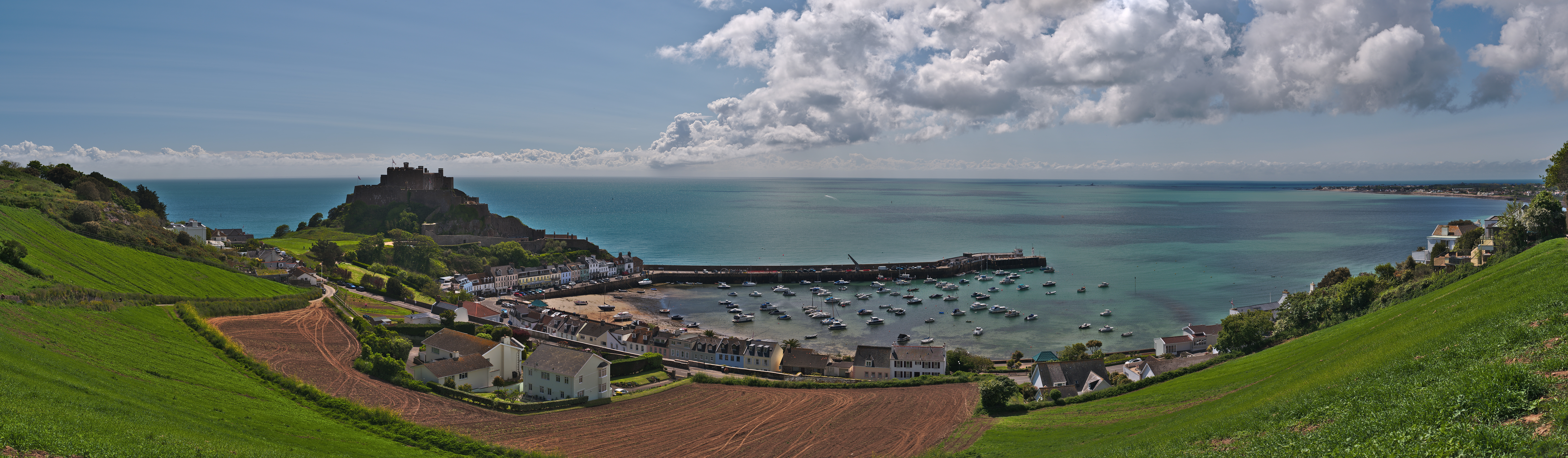
Mont Orgueil Castle over Gorey Harbour
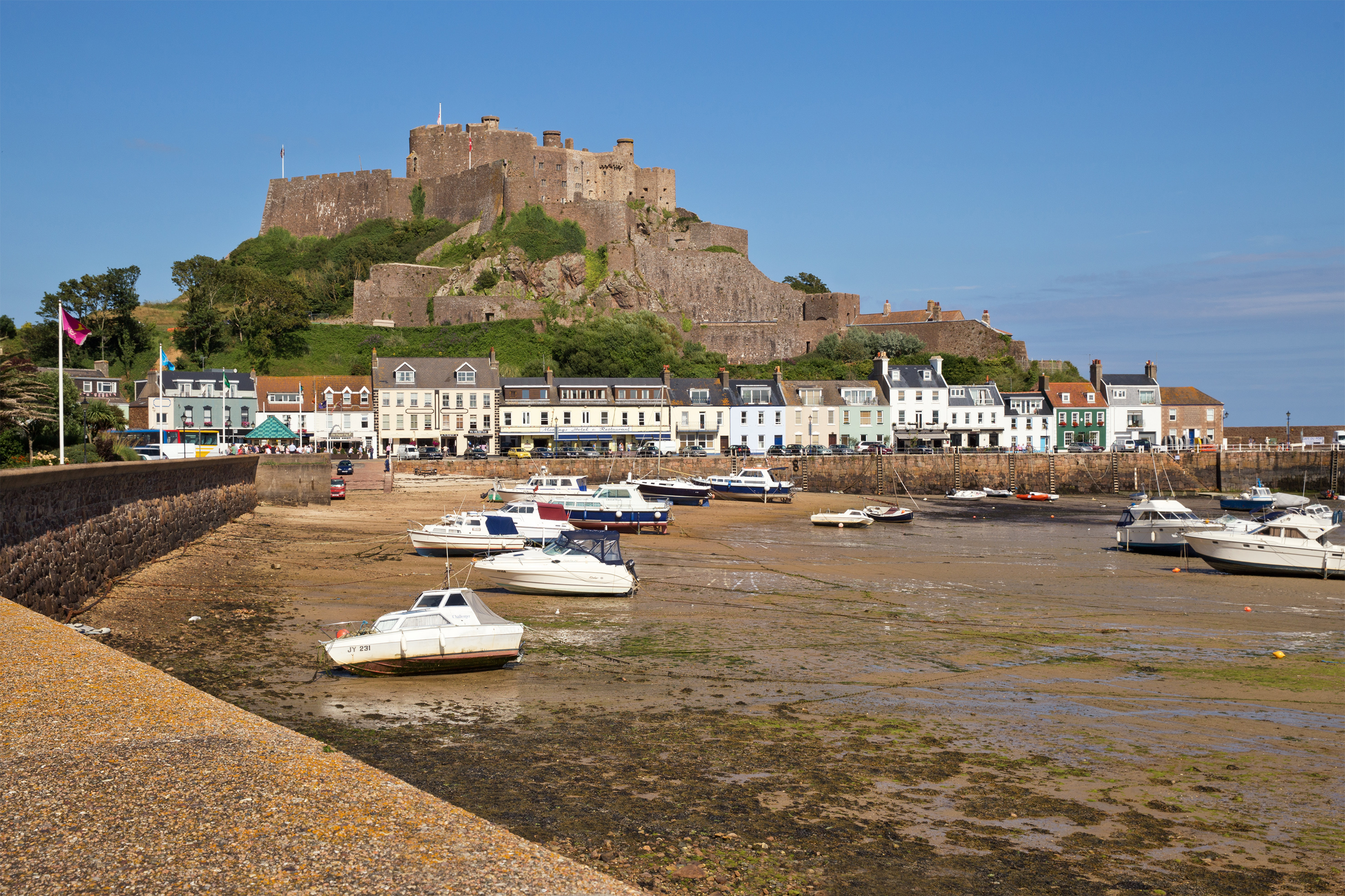
The castle of Mont Orgueil dominates village and harbour of Gorey

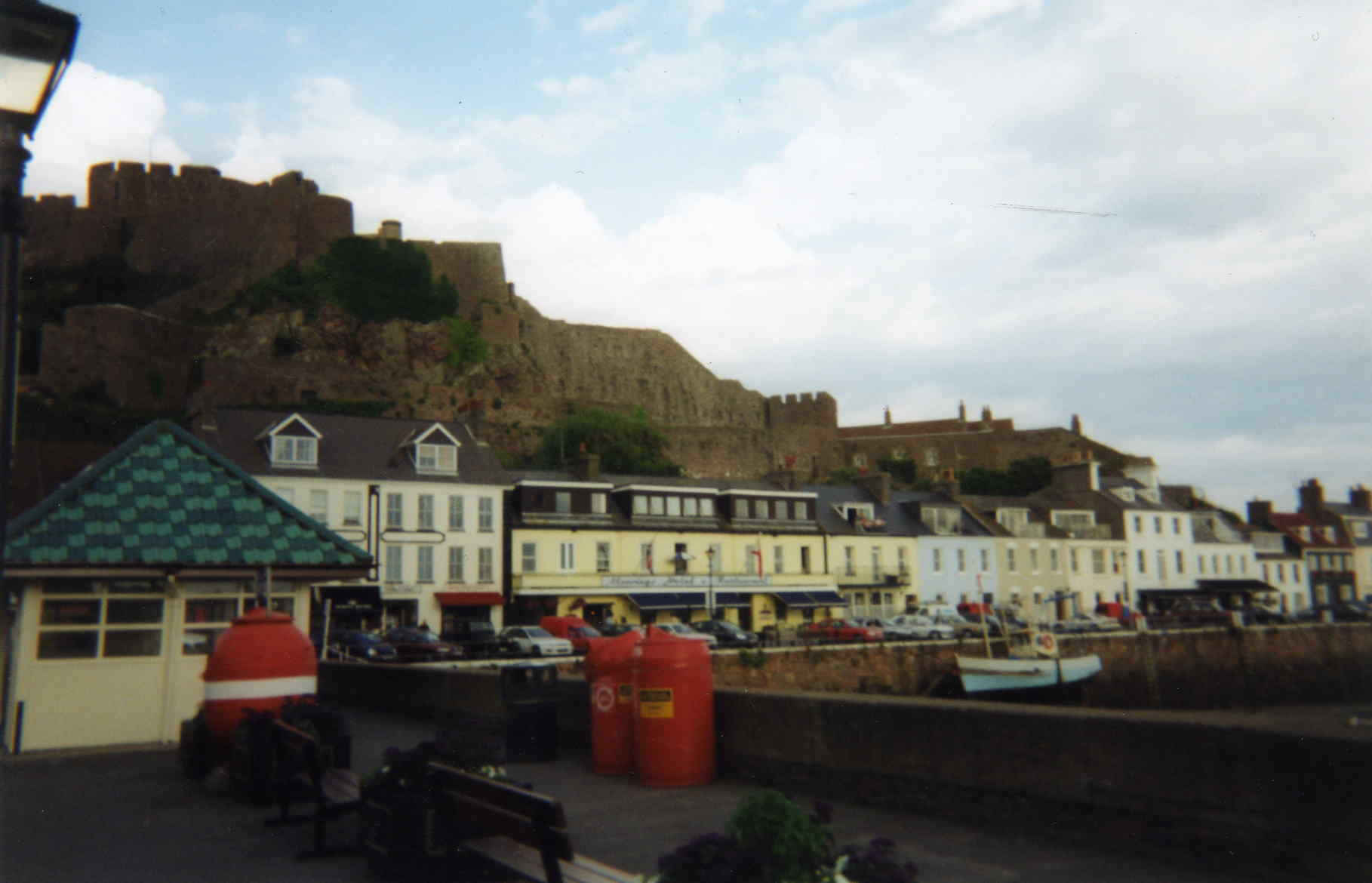
Another view of Gorey

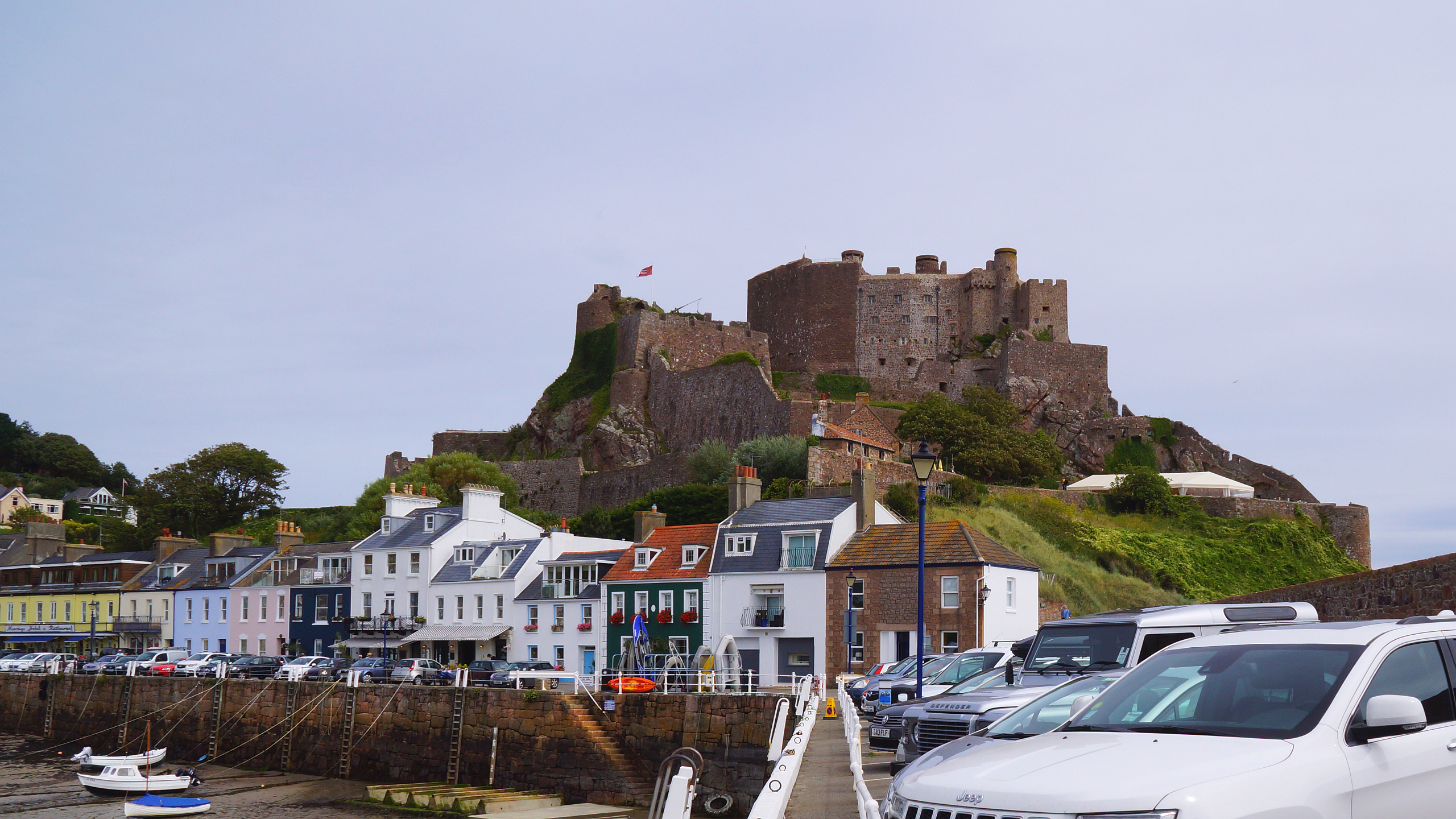
Better quality photograph with a view of Gorey

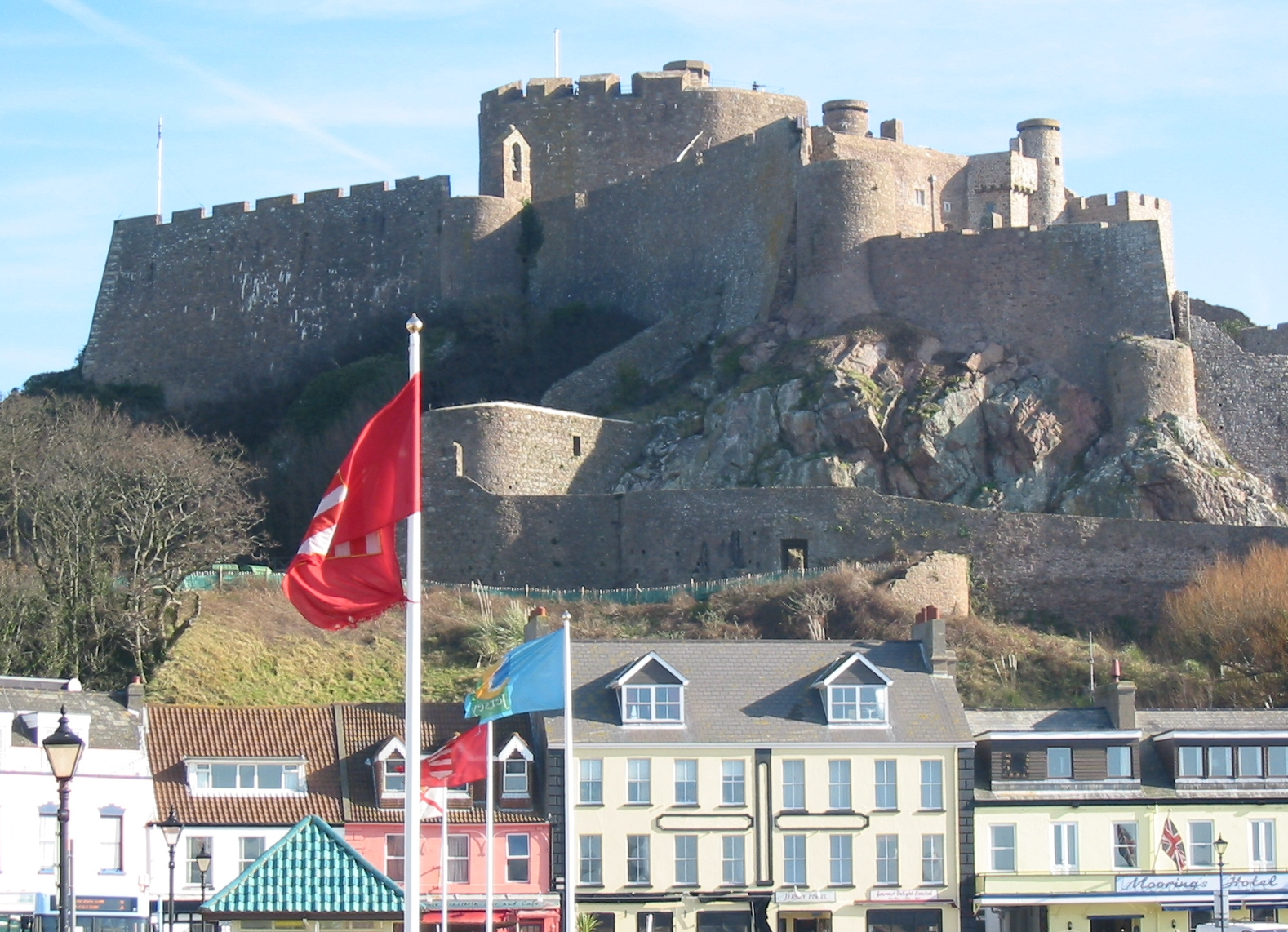
The pier below the castle contains restaurants, cafés and shops

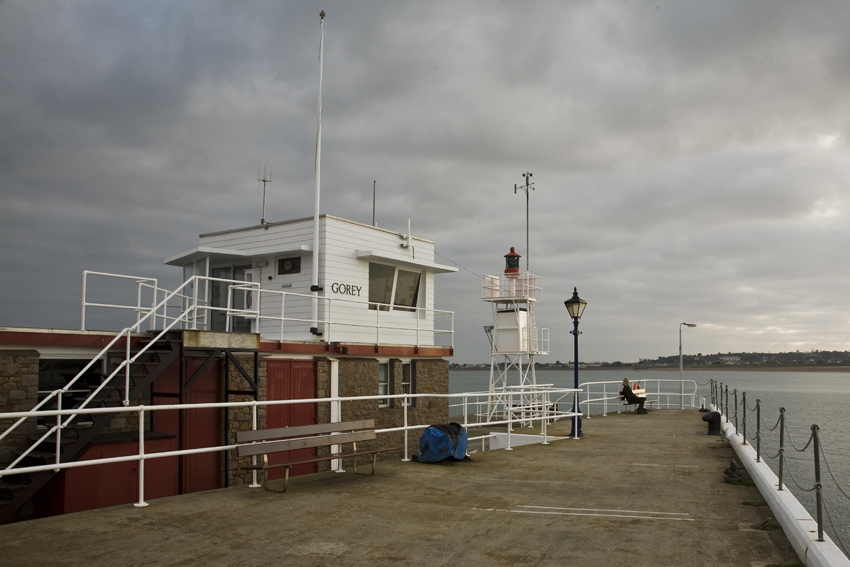
Gorey Harbour, looking south from the pier across the Royal Bay of Grouville towards La Rocque

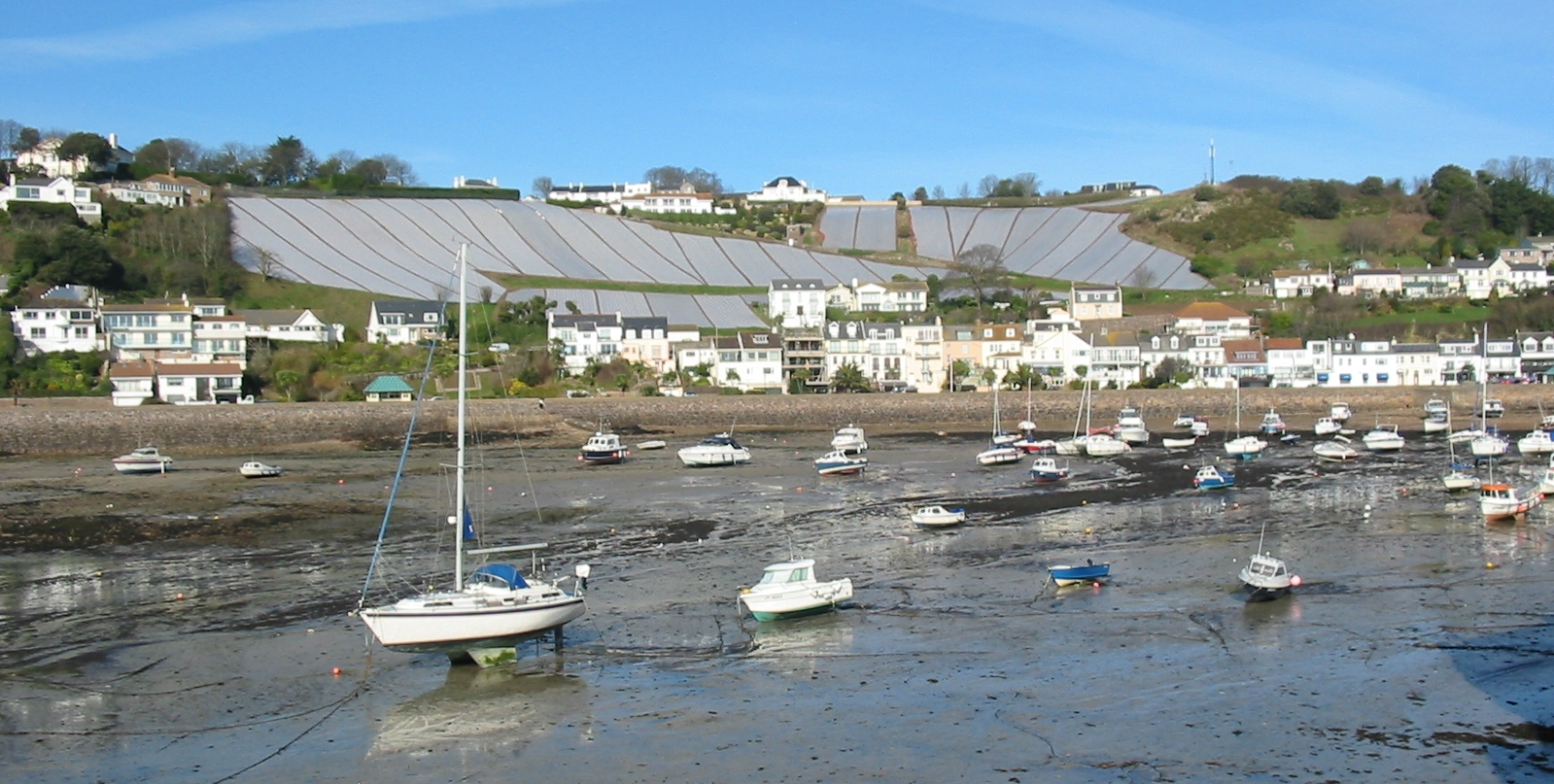
A view across the harbour from the pier at low tide

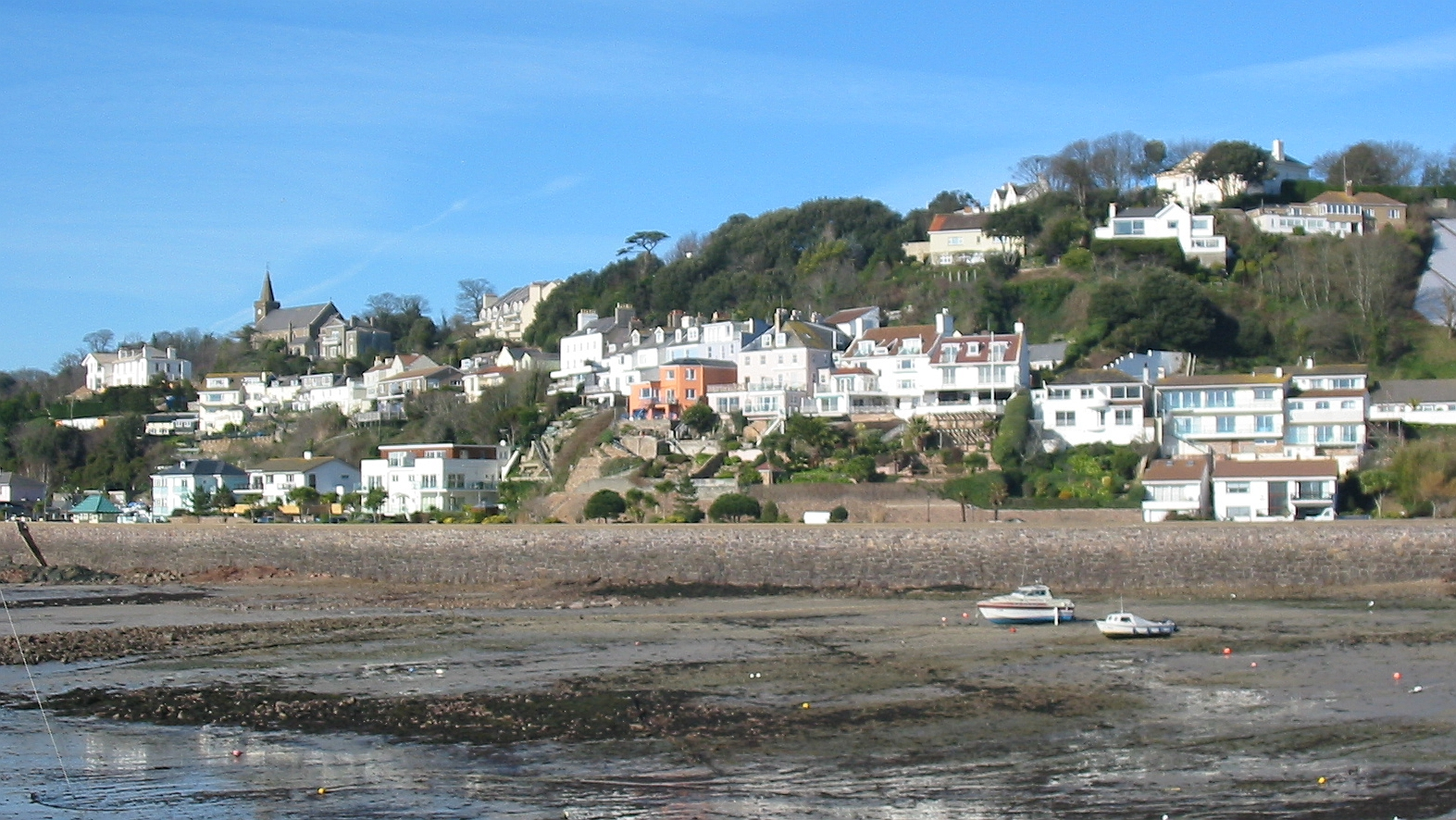
Gouray Church can be seen on the hill at left

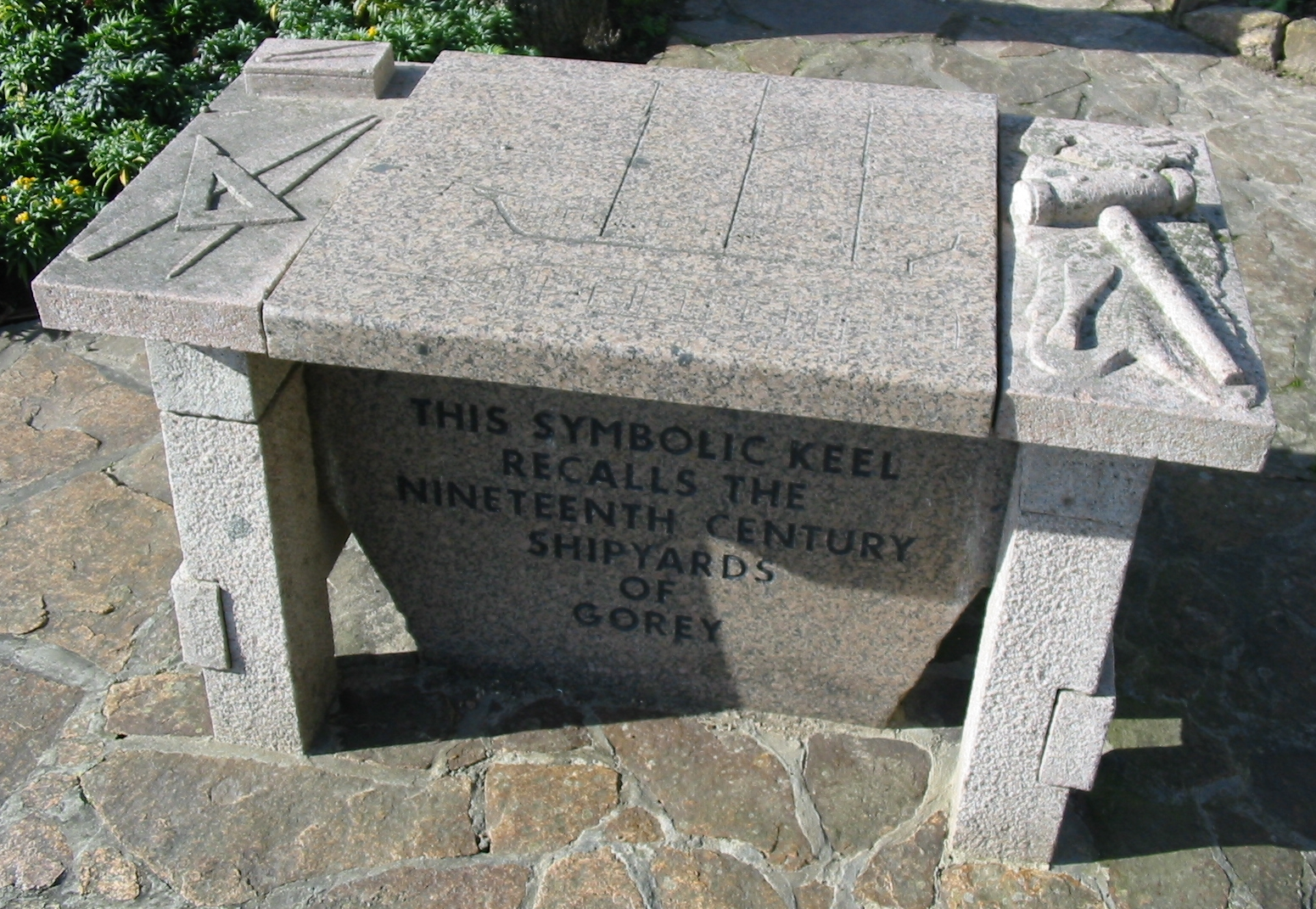
A sculptural ensemble commemorates the 19th century shipyards of Gorey

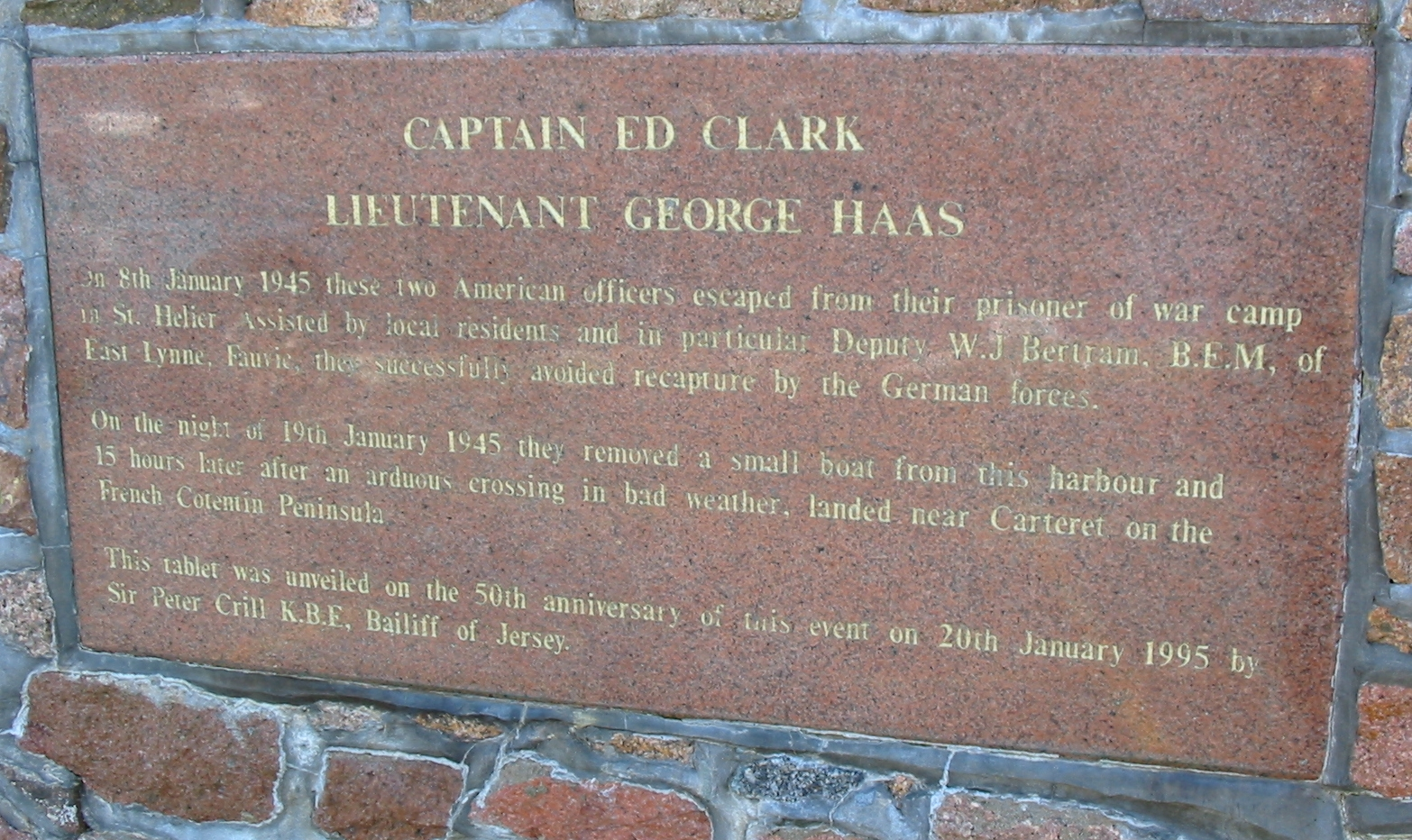
On 19 January 1945, the harbour was the scene of an escape by two American officers

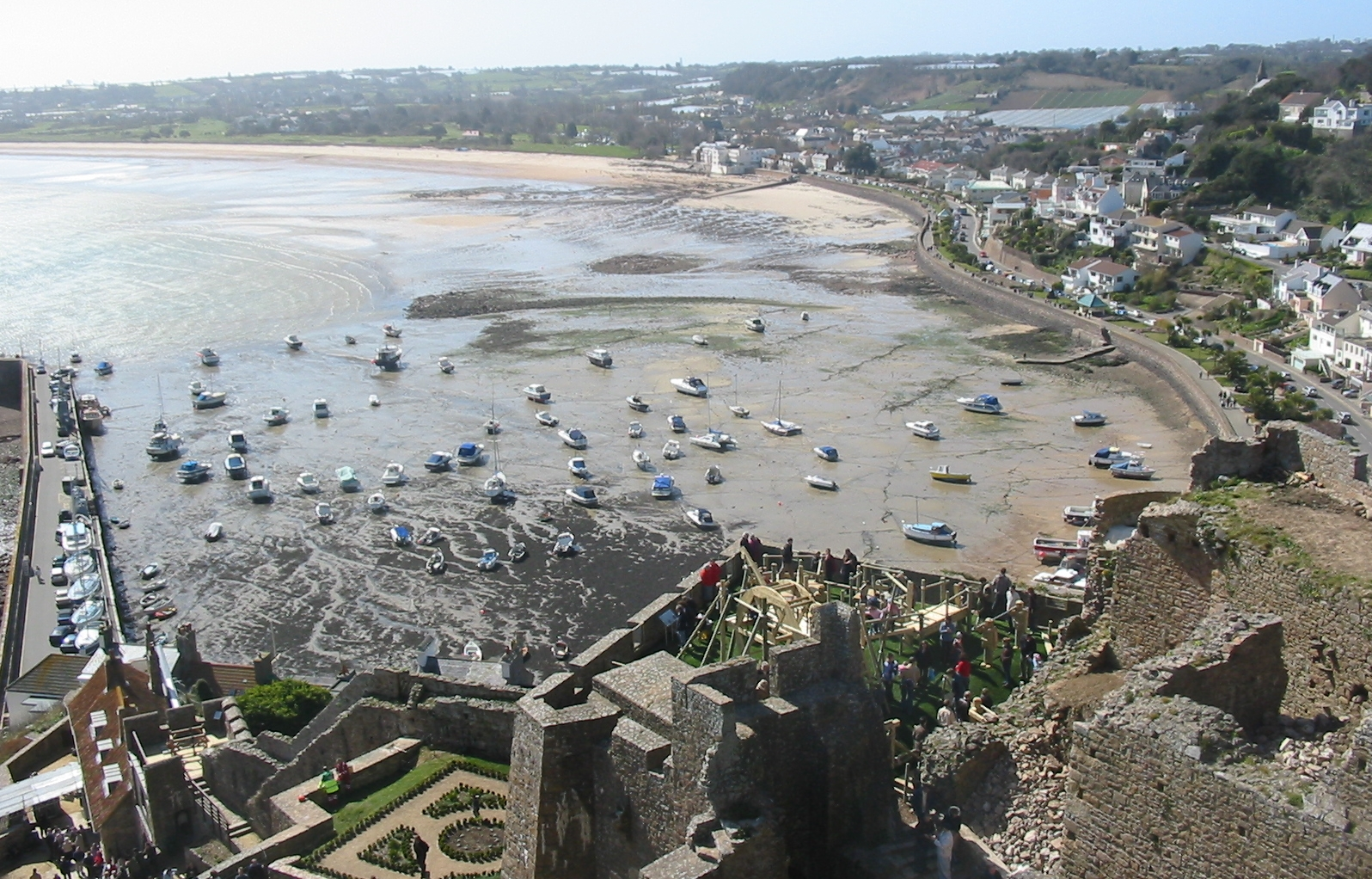
A view from Mont Orgueil

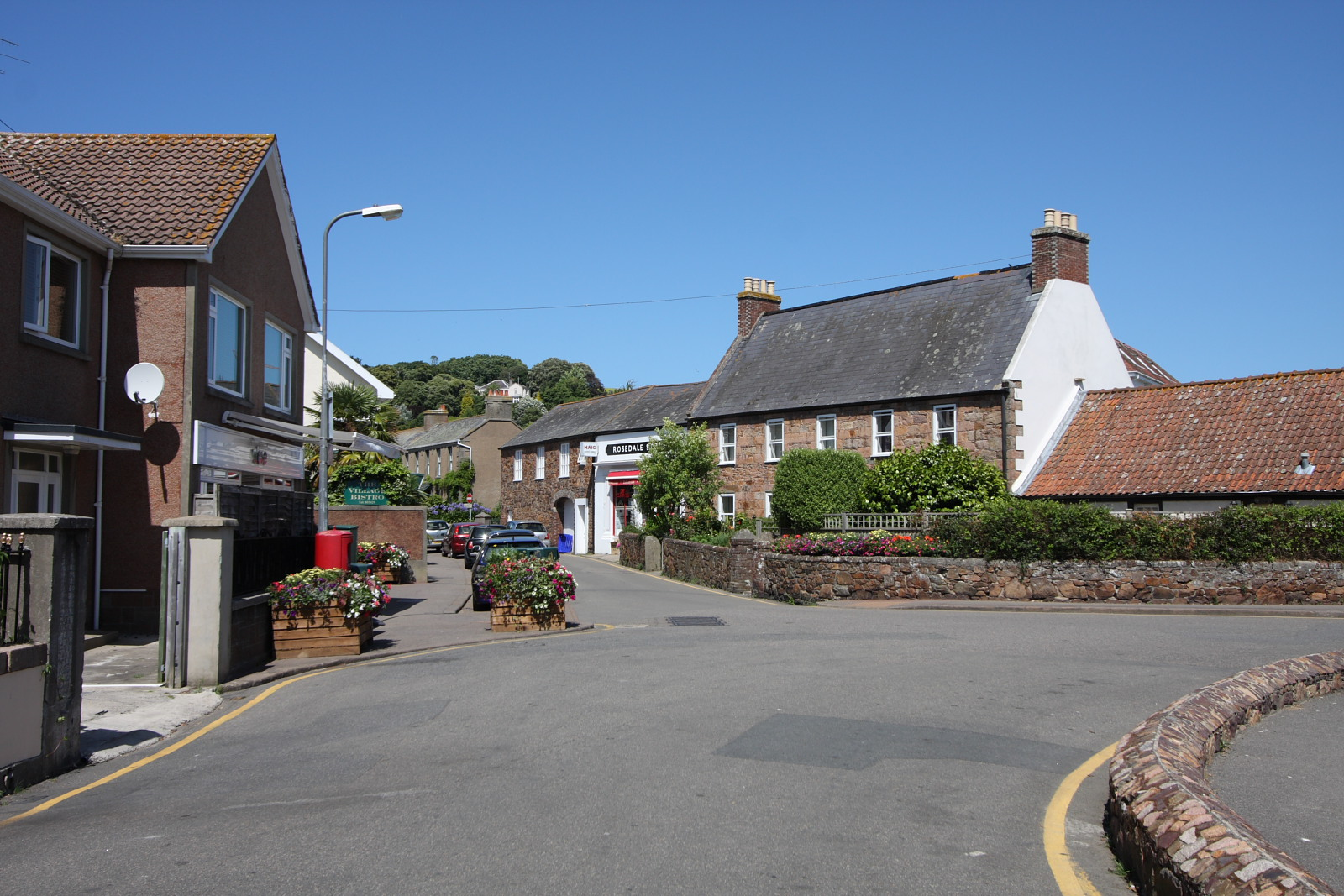
Gorey Village

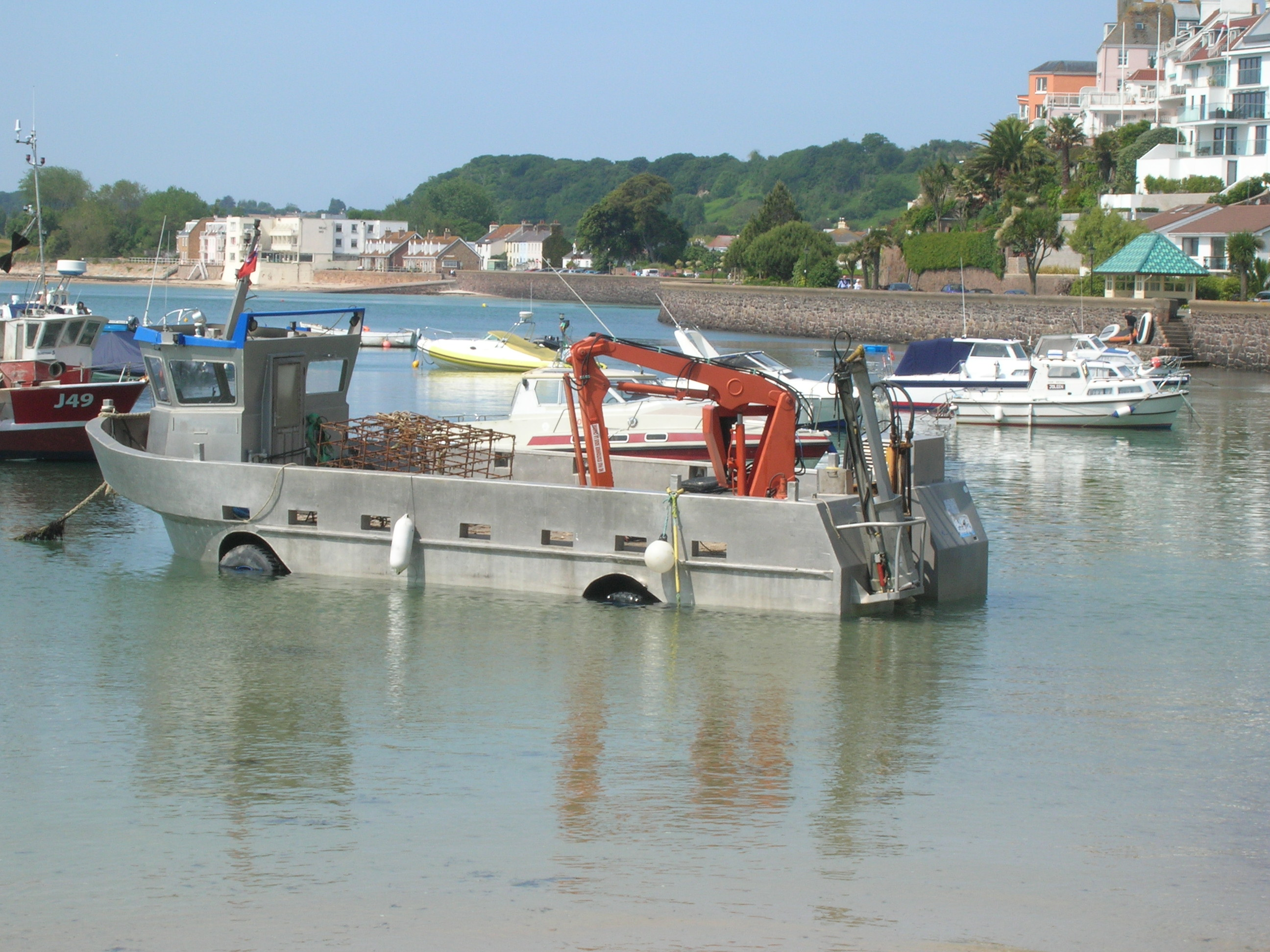
Oyster boat in the harbour at Gorey

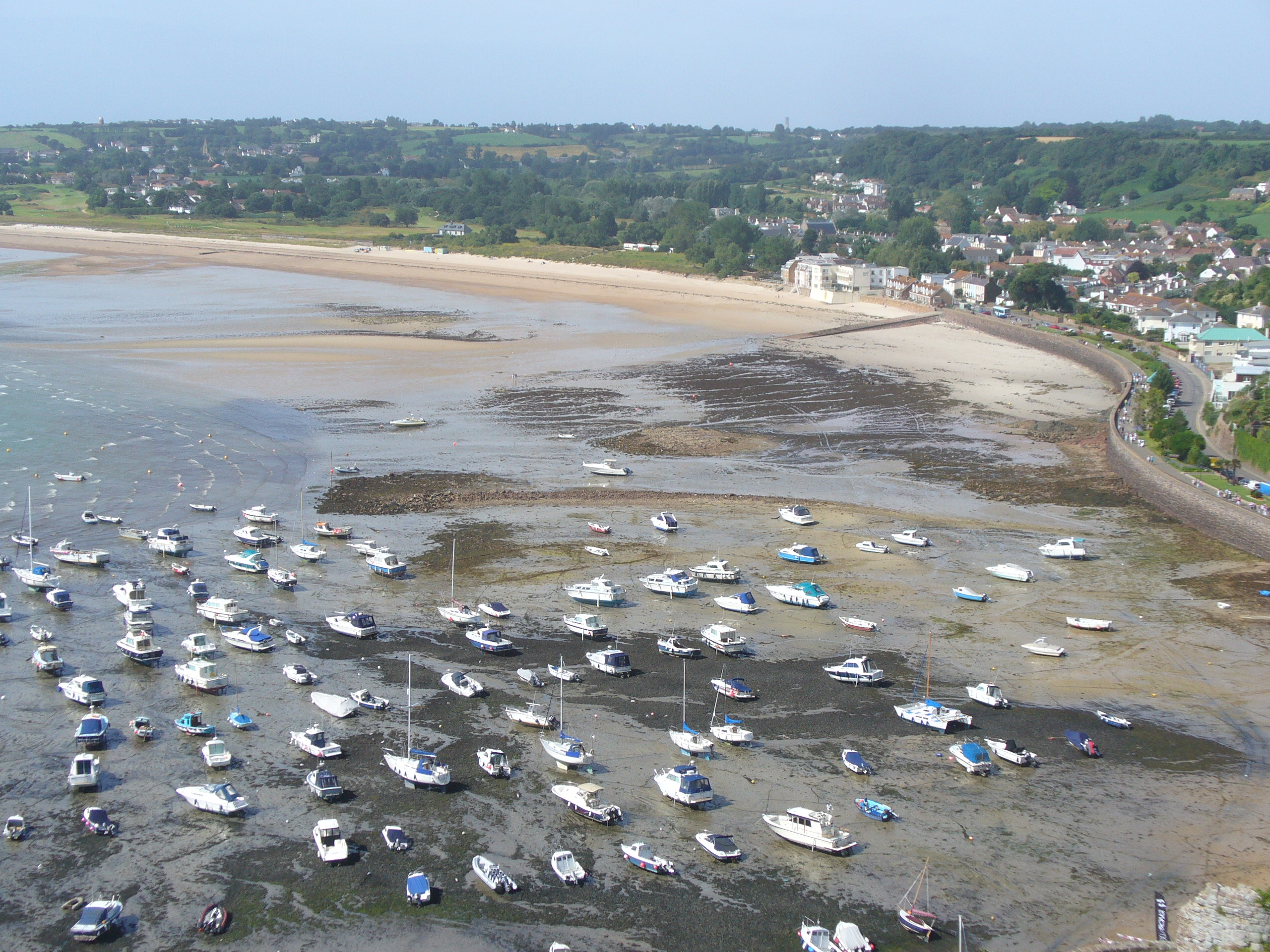
The harbour of Gorey falls dry at low tide

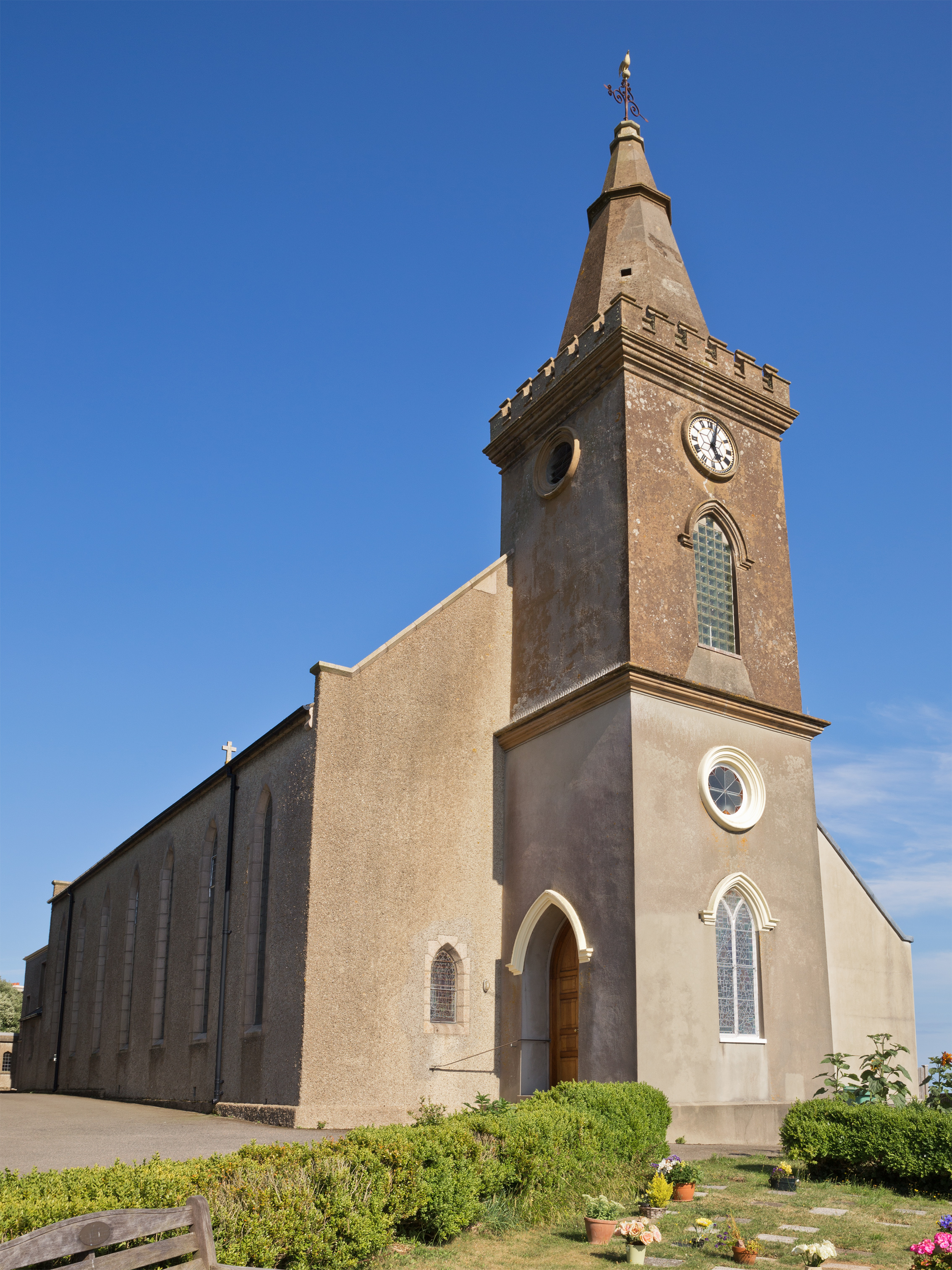
Church St Martin de Gouray
