= Victoria Avenue (Jersey) =

Dual carriageway on the island of Jersey

A2
- Victoria Avenue
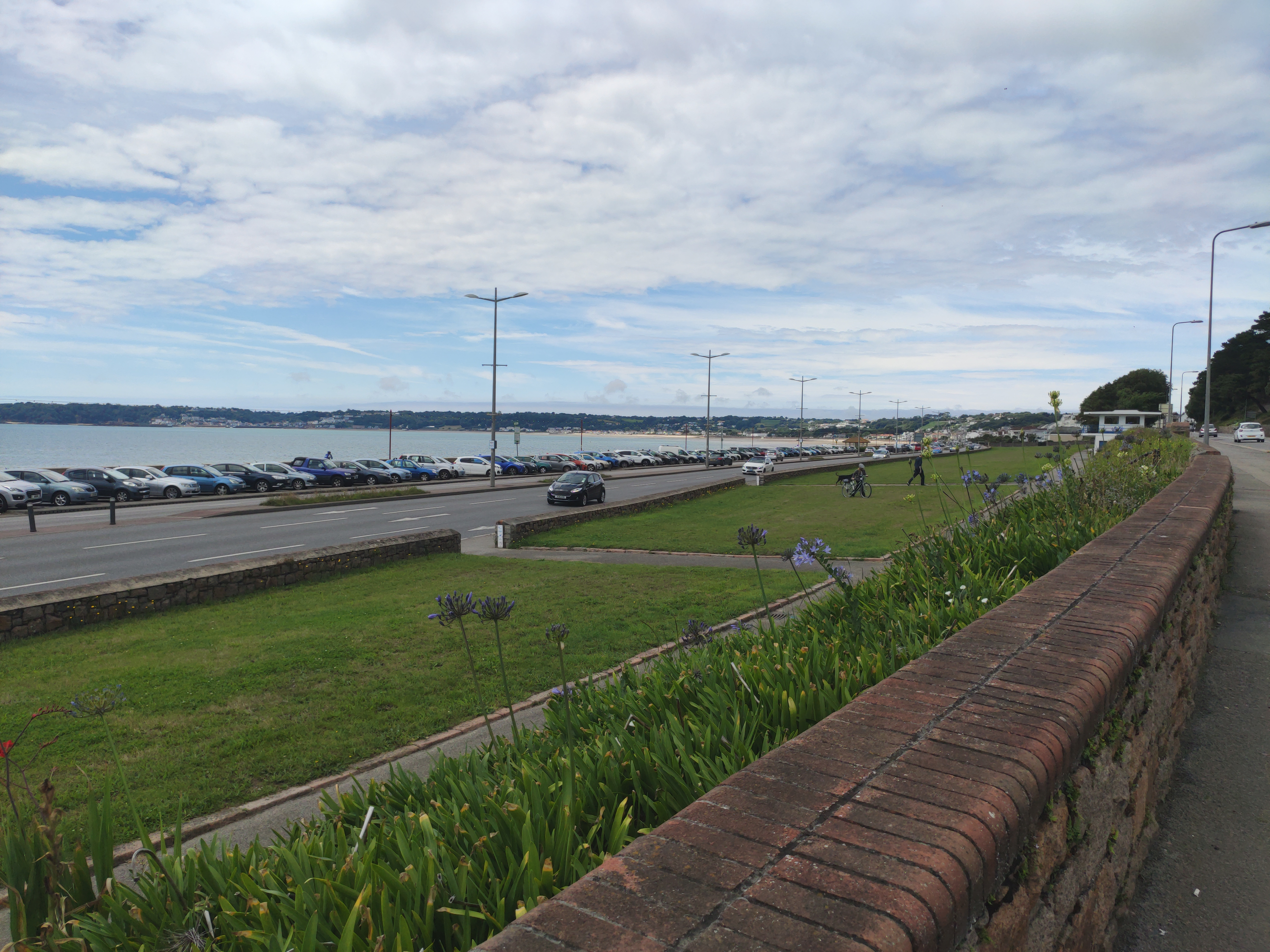

Location
- Country: United Kingdom
- Crown dependency: Jersey
- Parishes: St Helier, St Lawrence

Road network
- Transport in Jersey

Victoria Avenue (classified as the A2) is a major road in Jersey, connecting the capital St Helier to Bel Royal in St Lawrence, also providing access to the western part of the A1 for non-bus traffic, due to a bus gate that prevents traffic from the A1 continuing on the A1.

The road has been referred to as "the Island's most important route and event venue", due to the fact that 30,000 vehicles travel along the road each day, and it provides a vital route between the two largest conurbations on the island. The road also plays host to the island's largest annual festival, the Battle of Flowers.

It is the longest stretch of dual carriageway in the Channel Islands. The road has three signalised junctions, one at the eastern end of the road at West Park, one at First Tower and one at Millbrook.

Running along the southern side of the road is a series of car parks (known as "lay-bys"), a cycle track and the St Aubin's Bay promenade. The road has lovely views of the bay, and there are cafés and public toilets on the sea front.

== History ==
The road was constructed between 1895 and the Diamond Jubilee of Queen Victoria, after whom the road is named, in 1897. The road had initially been named for the former Connétable of St Helier Mr. Baudins as Boulevard Baudins. The road was originally a single carriageway, extending only as far as First Tower, however over time the road was extended and converted into a dual carriageway in the late 1950s.

Aerial photographs from 1965 show that the two ends of the avenue were roundabouts at that time. These were subsequently removed.

Between 2009 and 2010, upgrades to the road were part of a fiscal stimulus plan in response to the 2008 financial crisis. It involved the replaced of the aged drainage system, improvement of pedestrian facilities, the replacement of street lighting columns to improve energy efficiency and the lengthening of right-turn lanes to reduce congestion.

In May 2020, the Government of Jersey announced that some parking in the lay-bys could be removed to promote sustainable transport in response to a rise in usage of the promenade and cycle track, and a reduction in usage of the road during the COVID-19 pandemic.

== See also ==
- Roads in Jersey
