= PontAuRail =

PontAuRail was a voluntary association created in 1995 to run trains between Pont-Audemer and Honfleur in France. The group comprised approximately fifty voluntary members, of which twenty were active. An agreement, une convention signée, allowed PontAuRail to use the line between Pont-Audemer and Honfleur on request on Saturdays, Sundays and bank holidays.

The trip along the Risle valley lasted fifty-five minutes, including manoeuvres; closing of the semi-automatic level crossings in Pont-Audemer and shunting in Honfleur.

The PontAuRail group was disbanded in 2006 and the railway line was abandoned.

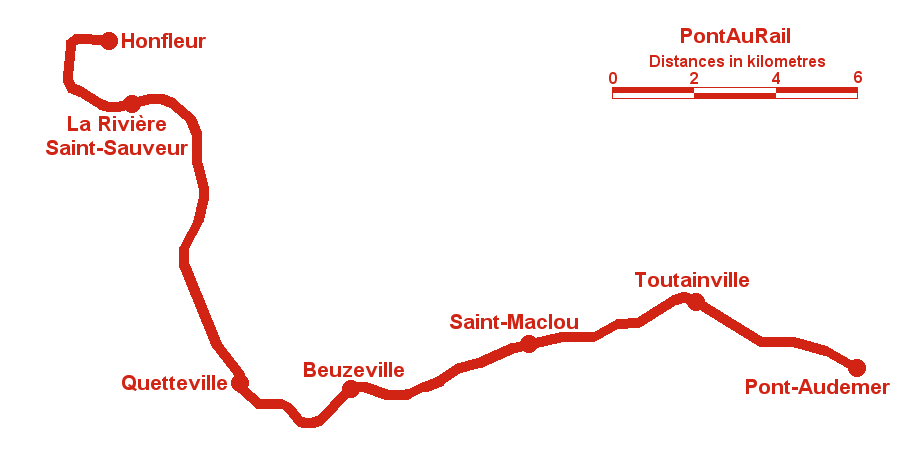
Plan of the PontAuRail line.

== Rolling stock ==
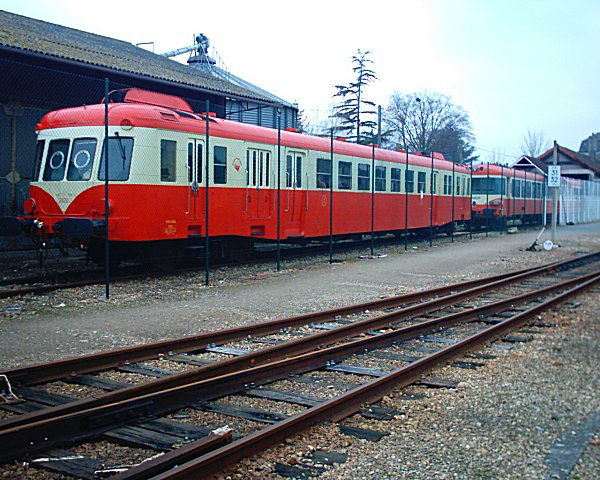
X 2426 in Pont-Audemer.

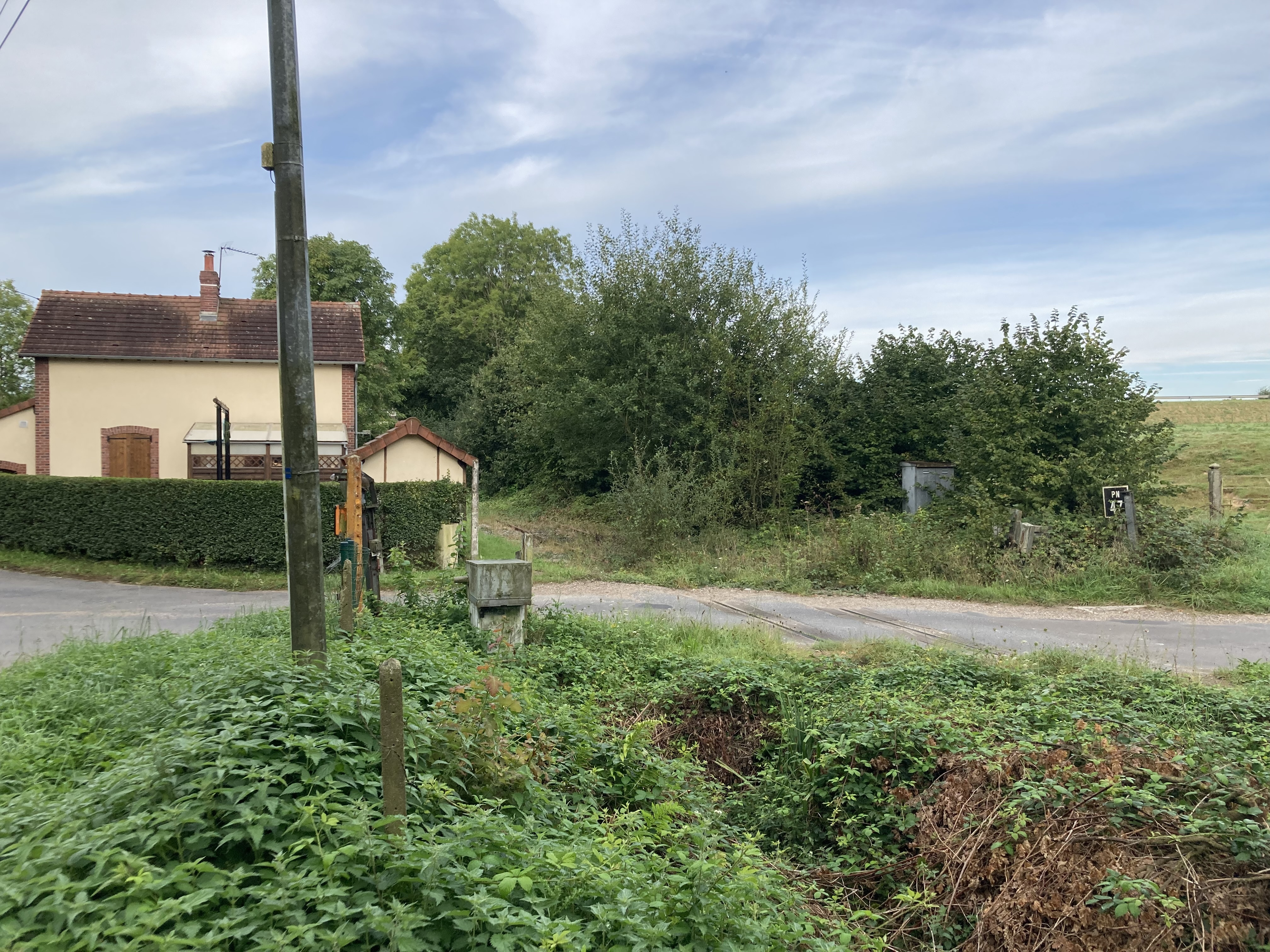
Level crossing near Beuzeville in 2023

PontauRail operated with two ex-SNCF diesel multiple units, X2426 and X4555.

- Railcar X2426 was officially decommissioned on 27 September 1987 in Limoges. Saved from scrapping, it became the property of the Train Touristique du Cotentin until 1995 when it was purchased by the Risle Seine SIVOM to create pleasure railway service between Pont-Audemer and Honfleur. It remained parked in Gare de Carentan for a long time and then was vandalised in Gare de Pont-Audemer. It was then restored carefully and repainted in its original livery. X2426 became the property of PontAuRail following the dismantling of the SIVOM.
- DMU X4555 was entrusted to PontAuRail by the SNCF in 2004. X4555 was built in 1965 and allocated to Lyon Vaise on 10 November 1965. It was then moved to Nevers on 23 May 1971 then to Marseille on 9 June 1971 and finally to Longueau on 30 September 1982. It was then decommissioned in September 2003. It ran services in 2005 in replacement of the X2426, which was less powerful than the X4555.

== Stations ==
- Pont-Audemer
- Toutainville
- Saint-Maclou
- Beuzeville
- Quetteville
- La Rivière Saint-Sauveur
- Honfleur
