= History of Jersey =

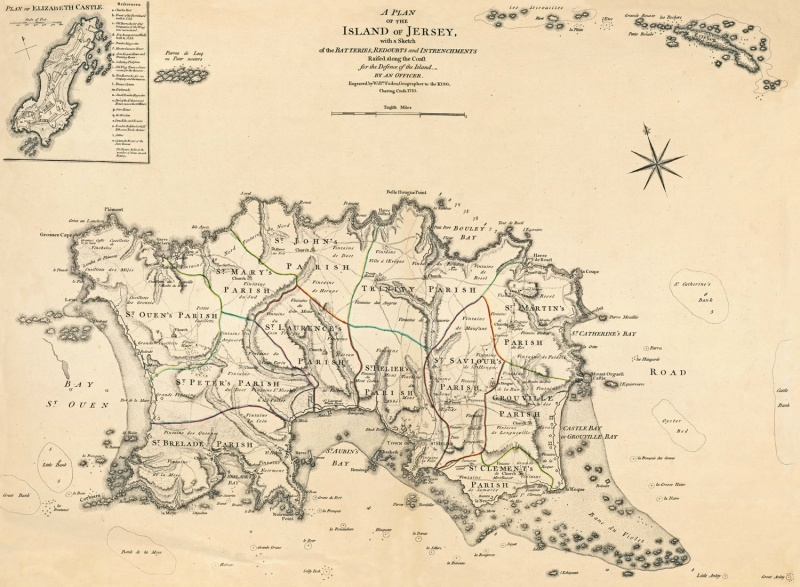
A map of Jersey dating from 1783

Jersey – the largest of the Channel Islands – has been an island for around 6,000 years. Early inhabitation is evidenced by various neolithic monuments and hoards. In the 10th century, Jersey became part of Normandy. When the Normans conquered England in the 11th century, Jersey remained a part of the Duchy of Normandy, but when Normandy and England were finally split in the 13th century, the Channel Islands remained loyal to the English Crown, splitting Jersey politically from mainland Normandy.

Due to the English kings' continuing claim to the Duchy of Normandy, Jersey's Norman political and legal structures remained after the split, which led to the establishment of self-governance as a Crown Dependency. Between the 11th and 15th centuries, political tensions between England and France placed Jersey at the frontline of frequent wars.

During the Tudor period, the English Crown split from the Roman Church and immigration to the island of French religious refugees led to the establishment of Calvinism as the major religion of the island. In 1617, the Privy Council separated the powers of Governor and Bailiff, establishing that the Bailiff had sole jurisdiction over justice and civil affairs in the island. During the English Civil War, Jersey remained more loyal to the Crown due to the loyalties of the de Carteret family, though the island was eventually captured by Parliamentarian forces. After restoration, the de Carterets were gifted land in the American colonies, establishing New Jersey.

In the 18th century, Jersey experienced bouts of unrest, culminating in the Corn Riots of 1769. As a result, legislative power was concentrated in the States in 1771, stripping the Royal Court of its lawmaking abilities. Island politics was then split between the Magot and Charlot parties through much of the 19th century. In 1781, the island was invaded by the French, but was defeated by an army led by Major Francis Peirson in the Battle of Jersey. From 1815, new peace with the French meant the island lost strategic military value. Improvements in transport infrastructure led to non-political increased links with the United Kingdom. Alongside this, a rising sense of British nationalism led the island's culture, which had previously retained many Norman-French qualities, to become highly anglicised.

The islands were away from the frontline of the First World War, but during the Second World War, the Channel Islands were the only part of the British Isles to be occupied by enemy forces. From 1940 to 1945, Jersey was occupied by German forces. The islands were liberated on 9 May 1945, which is still celebrated as the island's national day. After liberation, the island became a popular tourist destination and has become a major offshore finance centre.

== Name of the island ==
Although Jersey was part of the Roman world, there is a lack of evidence to give a better understanding of the island during the Gallo-Roman and early Middle Ages. The tradition is that the island was called Caesarea by the Romans as laid down in the Antonine Itinerary, however this is disputed by some, who claim Caesarea, Sarnia and Riduna are the Scilly Isles off the southwestern tip of England, nevertheless Sarnia in particular has a large cultural influence as the historic name of Guernsey (for example the national anthem of Guernsey is Sarnia chérie). Andium however is also mentioned on the list and this name is very often attributed to Jersey. Therefore, it is possible another island, such as the Minquiers were in fact Caesarea and Jersey Andium.

The name is claimed to be the source of the modern name Jersey, -ey being a Norse signification of an island, and Jer- possibly being a contraction of Caesar, similar to Cherbourg, therefore the island meaning Caesar's island. Another claim for the origin of the name is as Geirr's Island from the Norse name Geirr or as the grassy isle from the Frisian gers.^{:16} The Roman name for the Channel Islands was I. Lenuri (Lenur Islands)

Some claim that the pre-Roman name for the island was Augia (alternatively Andium), and it was given by this name by King Childebert of France to Archbishop Samson of Dol in 550 CE. In the past the island's name has various variations of its spelling, such as Gersey, Jarzé, Gerzai and Gersui (including re-latinisations such as Gersoium and Grisogium) Andium has considerable popularity as the former name for Jersey, being for example the name of the island's social housing corporation.

=== Origins of other place names on the island ===
L'Etacq is of Norse origin, a derivative of L'Estack, from the Norse stakkr, meaning high rock. This word also gives name to various places called Etacquerel.^{:16}

== Prehistory ==
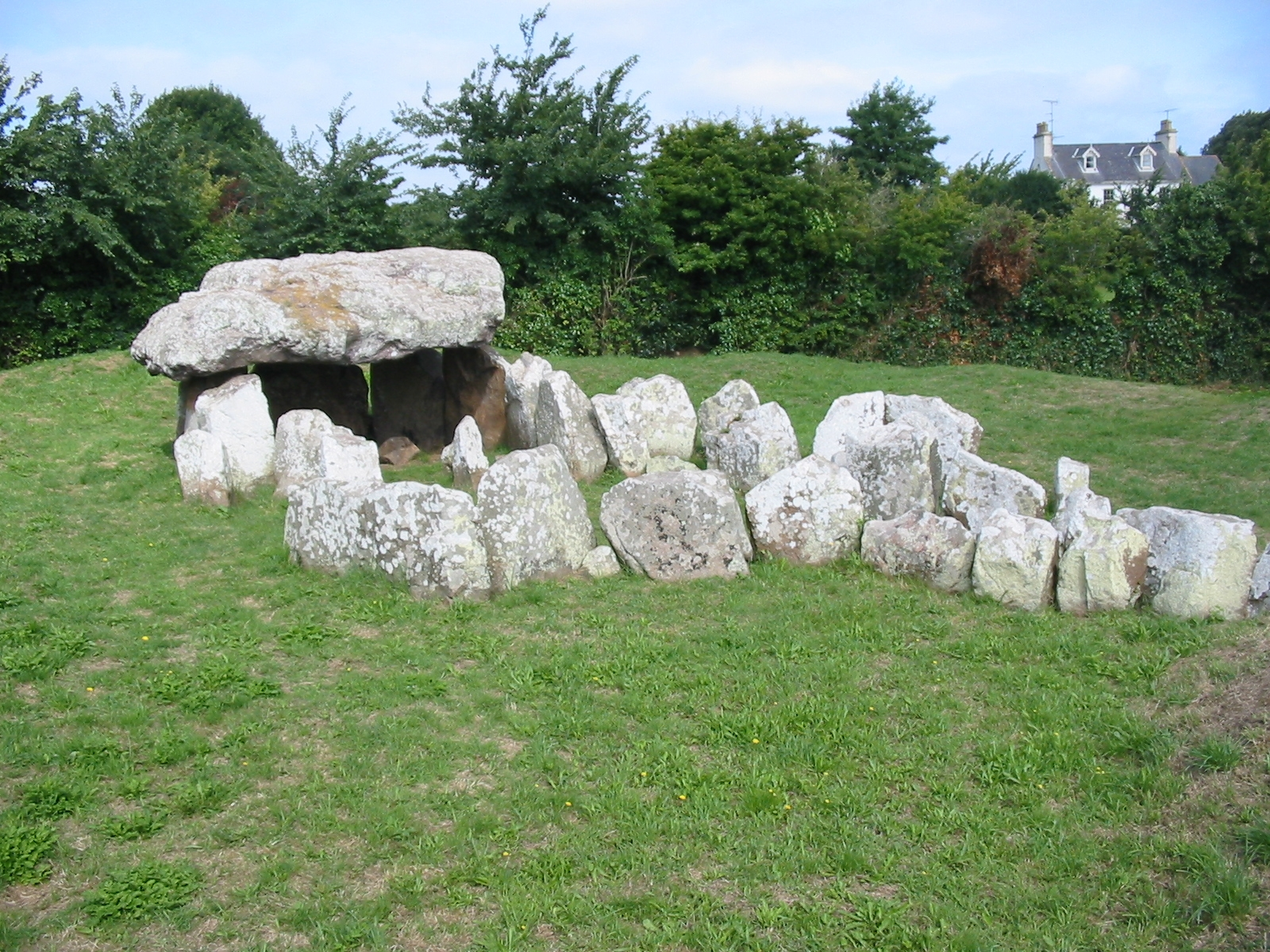
La Pouquelaye de Faldouet was constructed on a site on the east coast looking across to the Cotentin Peninsula.

The earliest evidence of human activity in Jersey dates to about 250,000 years ago in the Middle Paleolithic (before Jersey became an island) when bands of Neanderthal nomadic hunters used the caves at La Cotte de St Brelade as a base for hunting mammoth and woolly rhinoceros. The inland Les Varines site indicates that Jersey was occupied by modern humans of the late Upper Palaeolithic Magdalenian culture towards the end of the last ice age.

Due to rising sea levels, Jersey has been an island for approximately 6,000 years. The geology of the Channel Islands, has its origins in the Hercynian mountain building period, which also accounts for the hills of Brittany and the moors of Devon and Cornwall. At its current extremes it measures 10 miles (16 km) east to west and 6 miles (10 km) north to south. Evidence of Ice Age period engravings dating from at least 12,000 BC has been found, showing occupation by Homo sapiens.

Evidence also exists of settled communities in the Neolithic period, which is marked by the building of the ritual burial sites known as dolmens. The number, size, and visible locations of these megalithic monuments (especially La Hougue Bie) have suggested that social organisation over a wide area, including surrounding coasts, was required for the construction. Archaeological evidence also shows that trading links with Brittany and the south coast of England existed during this time.

=== Hoards ===
Evidence of occupation and wealth has been discovered in the form of hoards. In 1889, during construction of a house in Saint Helier, a 746-gram gold torc of Irish origin was unearthed. A Bronze Age hoard consisting of 110 implements, mostly spears and swords, was discovered in Saint Lawrence in 1976 – probably a smith's stock. Hoards of coins were discovered at La Marquanderie, in Saint Brelade, Le Câtel, in Trinity, and Le Câtillon, in Grouville (1957).

In June 2012, two metal detectorists announced that they had uncovered what could be Europe's largest hoard of Iron Age Celtic coins, 70,000 late Iron Age and Roman coins. The hoard is thought to have belonged to a Curiosolitae tribe fleeing Julius Caesar's armies around 50 to 60 BC.

In October 2012, another metal detectorist reported an earlier Bronze Age find, the Trinity Hoard.

== Early history ==
=== Prior to Normandy ===
Although there is no evidence of a Roman occupation of Jersey, historians consider that it is entirely feasible it was occupied by the Romans. Various Roman archeological artefacts have been found on the island, such as coins discovered on the north coast at Ile Agois. There are several sites attributed to the Romans on the island, such as Caesar's fort at Mont Orgeuil. Roman influence has been found, in particular at Les Landes, the coastal headland site at Le Pinacle, where remains of a primitive structure are attributed to Gallo-Roman temple worship (fanum).

When Augustus Caesar divided Gaul into four provinces, Jersey was part of the province headquartered at Lyons. Roman influence has a strong grounding in the development of Jersey culture, bringing vernacular Latin to the isle, which would later develop into Standard French and Jèrriais (and influence English).

During the migration of the Britons from Britain to Brittany (c. 5th – 6th century AD), specifically during the invasion led by St Samson, Bishop of Dol, it is believed the Channel Islands came to be settled by them. There are numerous references to the habitation of Jersey by Breton people. This likely brought Christianity to the island. Various saints such as the Celts Samson of Dol and Branwalator (Brelade) were active in the region. Tradition has it that Saint Helier from Tongeren in modern-day Belgium first brought Christianity to the island in the 6th century; part of the walls of the Fishermen's Chapel dates from this period and Charlemagne sent his emissary to the island (at that time called Angia, also spelt Agna) in 803. A chapel built around 911 now forms part of the nave of the Parish Church of St Clement.

=== Duchy of Normandy (873–1204) ===
From 873, Jersey was affected by the conquests by the Normans of the western coast of France (the Channel Islands were territory of the Kingdom of France at this time). During the reign of Charles III the Simple, the territory of modern Normandy was yielded to Rollo, the leader of the Normans, with the title of the "Duke of Normandy". While the Duchy was held in fief to the French Crown, the Crown only had limited rights in the province.

In around 933, Duke William I (William Longsword), seized Jersey, which until then had been politically linked to Brittany, and it is likely that the pre-Norman form of government and way of life was replaced at this point. The island adopted the Norman law system, still the basis of Jersey law today. During Norman rule, the island redeveloped after the devastation brought by the Vikings and developed agriculture. Immigration from the Norman mainland at this time first brought the modern Norman cultural influences found in the island today.^{:19}

A key part of the early administrative structure of Jersey was the fief. Alongside the parish, the fief provided a basic framework for rural life; the system began with the Norman system and largely remained similar to it. In Jersey, the dues, services and rents owed by tenants were extensive and often onerous. Jersey peasants retained a degree of freedom lost elsewhere, probably due to the insignificance of the island in the Duchy. More is known of the origins of the fief than of the parishes and early documents show that Jersey was thoroughly feudalised (the majority of the residents were tenants holding land from Seigneurs). The fief of St Ouen, the most senior fief in Jersey's feudal structure, was by 1135 in the hands of the de Carteret family. They held extensive lands in Carteret as well, but these were lost by them after King John's loss of Normandy, so they decided to settle on the island. Between the 12th and 20th centuries, there were an estimated 245 fiefs in Jersey, though not all simultaneously.

In 1066, the Duke William the Conqueror defeated Harold Godwinson at Hastings to become the King of England; however, he continued to rule his French possessions, including Jersey, as a separate entity, as fealty was owed to the King of France. This initial association of Jersey with England did not last long, as William split his possessions between his two elder sons: Robert Curthose became Duke of Normandy and William Rufus gained the English Crown. After William Rufus' death his younger brother Henry I claimed the English throne, and recaptured Normandy for England in 1106. The island was then part of the English King's realm (though still part of Normandy and France). Around 1142, it is recorded that Jersey was under the control of the Count of Anjou, who administered Normandy for the Duke.

According to the Rolls of the Norman Exchequer, in 1180 Jersey was divided for administrative purposes into three ministeria: de Gorroic, de Groceio and de Crapoudoit (possibly containing four parishes each). Gorroic is an old spelling for Gorey, containing St Martin, St Saviour, Grouville and St Clement; Groceio could derive from de Gruchy, and contains St John, Trinity, St Lawrence and St Helier; and Crapoudoit, likely referring to the stream of St Peter's Valley, contains the remainder of the parishes in the West. This was a time of building or extending churches with most parish churches in the island being built/rebuilt in a Norman style chosen by the abbey or priory to which each church had been granted. St Mary and St Martin being given to Cerisy Abbey. By Norman times, the parish boundaries were firmly fixed and remain largely unchanged since. It was likely set in place due to the tithe system under Charlemagne, where each property must contribute to the church, so each property would have had to be established within a parish. The parish system is much more important in Jersey than in England or post-Napoleon France.^{:15}

After the death of Henry II in 1189 and the short reign of Richard I, the island (and the rest of the Empire) fell to King John in 1199. In 1200, John agreed to render homage of his Norman territories to the King Philip Augustus of France, but in 1204, King Philip re-conquered the Duchy. Though the French initially occupied the Channel Islands from 1204 to 1206 (and again in 1216 to 1217), John recognised their strategic importance and recovered them. However, thanks to Pierre de Préaux, a governor of Rouen who possessed the isles, who decided to support King John, the islands remained in the personal possession of the English king and were described as being a Peculiar of the Crown.

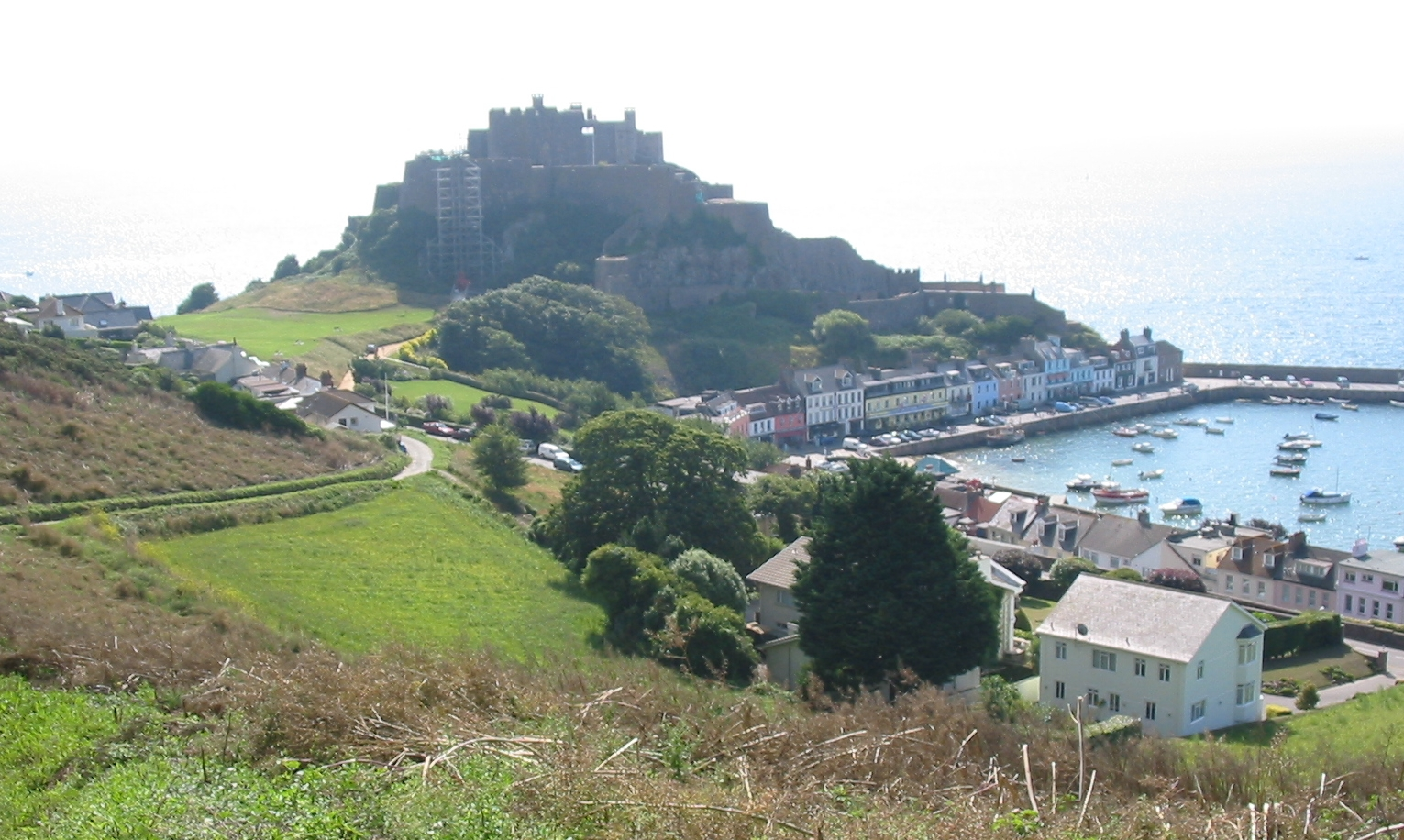
Mont Orgueil dominates the small harbour of Gorey and guards Jersey from attack from the French coast opposite

== 13th century ==
It is said, in tradition, that the island's autonomy derives from the Constitutions of King John, however this is disputed. Until King James II, successive English monarchs have then granted to Jersey by charter its certain privileges, likely to ensure the island's continued loyalty, accounting for its advantageous position at the boundary of the European continent. As John (and later Henry III) maintained his title as the rightful Duke of Normandy until 1259, the island's courts were originally established as Norman, not English territory (to use English law would de-legitimise the English Crown's claim to the ducal title), so are based upon traditional Norman laws and customs, such as the Coutumier de Normandie.

Now sited on the French-English border, the Channel Islands ceased to be a peaceful backwater and became a potential flashpoint on the international stage. Under the wardenships of Philippe d'Aubigny (1212–1224, 1232–1234), the island was attacked by Eustace the Monk, a pirate, while the warden was fighting for the King in the Barons' war. In 1217, Louis, the son of Philip II of France, ordered after the Treaty of Lambeth, that the supporters of Eustace should return the islands to England. The same year, Eustace was beheaded after being captured at Sandwich. Therefore, the Warden, de Suligny, constructed a castle at Gorey, known as Mont Orgueil, to serve as a royal fortress and military base. This was needed as the Island had few defences and had previously been suppressed by a fleet commanded by a French exile, Eustace the Monk working with the English King until in 1212 he changed sides and raided the Channel Islands on behalf of the French King.

An inquest was held into the loyalty of the Jersey landowners. Most Jersey landowners had their main estates on the Mainland, so John needed to re-organise the land to remove the unfaithful lords. Most lords forfeited their insular land in favour of their French territory, but some remained, notably the de Carteret family of St Ouen. The old aristocracy gave way to a new one, with landowners drawn from royal officials, who soon came to think of themselves as islanders rather than Englishmen. This saw the firm establishment of the feudal system in Jersey, with fiefs headed by Seigneurs.^{:30}

In the Treaty of Paris (1259), the King of France gave up claim to the Channel Islands. The claim was based upon his position as feudal overlord of the Duke of Normandy. The King of England gave up claim to mainland Normandy and therefore the Channel Islands were split from the rest of Normandy. The Channel Islands were never absorbed into the Kingdom of England and the island has had self-government since. The administration of the island was handled by an insular government. The King appointed a Warden (later "Capitain" or "Governor", now the Lieutenant-Governor of Jersey), a position largely occupied with the defence of the island. From 1415 until the second half of the 15th century, the islands were governed by a Lord (or Lady). Despite the end to Norman rule, the churches of the island were permitted to continue to be under the Diocese of Coutances for another 300 years to appease islanders, however at times of war the liberties of the clergy were often restricted.

The existing Norman customs and laws were allowed to continue and there was no attempt to introduce English law. The formerly split administrative system was replaced with a centralised legal system, of which the head was the King of England rather than the Duke of Normandy. The law was conducted through 12 jurats, constables (Connétable) and a bailiff (Baillé). These titles have different meanings and duties to those in England. Any oppression by a bailiff or a warden was to be resolved locally or failing that, by appeal to the King who appointed commissioners to report on disputes. In the late 1270s, Jersey was given its own Bailiff and from the 1290s, the duties of Bailiff and Warden were separated. The (Sub-)Warden became responsible for taxation and defence, while the Bailiff became responsible for justice. While probably originally a temporary arrangement by Otto de Grandison, this became permanent and the foundation for Jersey's modern separation of Crown and justice. It also lessened the Warden's authority relative to the Bailiff, who had much more interaction with the community.

The role of the jurats when the King's court was mobile would have been preparatory work for the visit of the Justices in Eyre. It is unknown for how long the position of the jurats has existed, with some claiming the position dates to time immemorial. After the cessation of the visits of the Justices in Eyre (and with the frequent absence of the Warden), the Bailiff and jurats took on a much wider role, from jury to justice.^{:28}

For geographic reasons, during the thirteenth century, the Channel Islands became a strategic stopping point for fleets carrying goods, particularly wine, across the Channel. This led to an economic boom, islanders becoming highly wealthy, and a population boom. Jersey's population probably numbered around 12,000, beyond what the island's agriculture was able to sustain itself.

In 1294, Philip IV the Fair of France refused to return Aquitainian fortresses surrendered to his men by Edward I and his brother Edmund Crouchback as a show of good faith after an outbreak of piracy and informal war between the two countries. Jersey was attacked the same year as part of the ensuing Gascon War and in revenge for the destruction of a French fleet in the Channel. Churches, homes, and crops were destroyed and many islanders died.

== 14th and 15th centuries ==
=== Plague and Hundred Year's War (1337–1455) ===
In 1336, the Scots king David Bruce attacked the Channel Islands, committing arson, murder and other atrocities. Due to this attack, other attacks and the threat of further attacks from the Scots, an Island Militia was formed in 1337, which was compulsory for the next 600 years for all men of military age. In November 1337, King Edward III broke off negotiations with the French, starting the Hundred Year's War.

In March 1338, a French force led by Admiral Béhuchet landed on Jersey, intent on capturing the island. The French devastated the island. In four parishes, all tithe corn was burnt. Although the island was overrun, Mont Orgueil remained in English hands, besieged by Béhuchet. The French remained until September, when they sailed off to conquer Guernsey, Alderney, and Sark. In 1339, the French returned, allegedly with 8,000 men in 17 Genoese galleys and 35 French ships. Led by Robert Bertrand, to whom the islands had been transferred by the French King, the French forces promised islanders their ancient liberties, which had not been ratified by the English King in recent times. A number of senior islanders were pro-French at the time. Again, they failed to take the castle and, after causing damage, withdrew.

In 1341, in recognition of islanders' efforts during the war, Edward III declared that Jerseymen should 'hold and retain all privileges, liberties, immunities and customs granted by our forebears'. This began the tradition of successive Monarchs devolving powers over the island to Islanders, giving them certain privileges and protecting the separation between the Channel Islands and the rest of their royal realm. In 1342, the Warden Sir Thomas of Hampton attempted to recapture Castle Cornet with a contingent of Jerseymen. His Lieutenant Henry de la More however lost the faith gained from the islanders by the King's charter. Islanders petitioned the King to punish de la More and Hampton. The island was thrown in a sullen revolt, which sometimes broke out into fighting.

The change in England to a written language in "English" was not taken up in Jersey, where Norman-French continued until the 20th century.

In 1348, when the Black Death would likely have reached the island, there are no kept records for the number of deaths seen on the island. Coastal France was highly affected by the plague and it is likely that the death toll was around 30–40 percent in Jersey. In the wake of the plague, the island experienced economic stagnation but high levels of employment, with population numbers kept down by late marriage and declining fertility.

In July 1373, Bertrand du Guesclin overran Jersey and besieged Mont Orgueil. His troops succeeded in breaching the outer defences, forcing the garrison back to the keep. The garrison came to an agreement that they would surrender if not relieved by Michaelmas and du Guesclin sailed back to Brittany, leaving a small force to carry on the siege. An English relief fleet arrived in time.

In 1378, the island was placed in an awkward position during the Western Schism. The island was under the Diocese of Coutances in France, while administered politically by England. Therefore, as France supported Clement's claim to the Papal see and England supported Urban's, there was tension in the island between the Government and Church. The Warden ordered the banishment of the Dean, labelled a 'supporter of the anti-Pope'. The island was placed under an Urbanite Administrator, as a separately administered part of the Coutances diocese.

In the 1390s, under Richard II who was eager for peace with France, the island was almost recognised as an integral part of Normandy and returned to the French Crown. He did however in 1394 grant the islands the right of exemption from tolls, duties and customs in England.

However, this matter was interrupted by the usurpation of Henry IV in England in 1399. When he seized the throne, Henry renewed the charters confirming the privileges of Jersey. Henry's much firmer stance on relations with the French caused the war with France to resume. On 7 October 1406, 1,000 French men at arms led by Pedro de Niño, a Castilian nobleman turned corsair, invaded Jersey, landing at St Aubin's Bay and defeated the 3,000 defenders but failed to capture the island. They landed in St Aubin's Bay (at the islet where Elizabeth Castle now stands) at night, then the next morning advanced across the beach towards the town, but lost the battle. The next day they moved towards Mont Orgueil. An agreement was reached with the invaders that the island would pay a hefty ransom and they left on 9 October.

In 1412, Henry V came to the throne with a renewed vigour to reclaim England's former continental possessions. In 1413, Parliament ordered the transfer of all foreign-owned property to the Crown, which led to the closure of six priorities in England and the cessation of tithes to the Church in France. Instead, the tithes from the Church's land in Jersey was reverted to the Crown. Henry's successful campaign against the French involved Jerseymen: in the siege of Cherbourg in 1418, every boat on the island was called out to support the blockade. In 1420, Henry entered Paris, leaving Jersey no longer an outpost of the English realm, leading to years of prosperity and the enlargement of many parish churches. When Henry called the bishops of Normandy to do him homage in Rouen, only Coutances obeyed. As a result, Jersey was returned to his full jurisdiction.

From 1429, animosity towards the English rulers by the French and the subsequent rise of Joan of Arc inspired France to evict the English from mainland France, with the exception of Calais, returning Jersey to the front line. This eviction cemented Jersey's Britishness. Had England not lost its possessions, France would certainly have become the dominant part of the Anglo-French combined realm, and its relative geographic and cultural proximity would have made Jersey markedly part of France.

=== War of the Roses (1455–1487) ===
During the Hundred Years' War (1337–1453), the French did not succeed in capturing Jersey. However, during the War of the Roses (1455–1487), Margaret of Anjou, queen consort of England, made a secret deal with Pierre de Brézé to gain French support for the Lancastrians, leading to the French capturing Mont Orgueil in the summer of 1461. In 1462, de Brézé issued ordinances outlining the role of the bailiff and the jurats. Jersey was occupied by French forces until 1468 when Yorkist forces and local militia recaptured the castle.

Edward IV oversaw the administrative separation of Jersey and Guernsey. In 1469, he issued separate charters of privilege for the bailiwicks and from 1478 the islands had different captains (albeit with a common captain in chief).

It may well be during this occupation that the island saw the establishment of the States. Comte Maulevrier, who had led the invasion of the island, ordered the holding of an Assize in the island. Maulevrier confirmed the place of existing institutions, however created the requirement for Jurats to be chosen by Bailiffs, Jurats, Rectors and Constables.

=== Tudors and Reformation (1485–1603) ===
The accession of Henry VII is determined as the 'final separation [of the Channel Islands] from Normandy'. The end of the War of the Roses marked the end of the previously complex, war-torn relationship with Normandy. In 1496, King Henry VII obtained a Papal bull to transfer the islands from the Bishop of Coutances to Salisbury, although for nearly 50 years after, due to the proximity of the isles to Coutances, the Bishop continued to act as the de facto bishop of the islands.^{:67}

During the 16th century, ideas of the reformation of the church coupled with the split with the Catholic Faith by Henry VIII, resulted in the islanders adopting the Protestant religion, in 1569 the churches moved under the control of the Diocese of Winchester. During the reign of Edward VI, the Government issued a new prayer book, which was translated into French, however did not arrive in the island until the throne had changed hands to Mary I, who led the restoration of Catholicism in England. However, Jersey did not have any death sentences issued for Catholicism, due to the island being kept out of the limelight by its Governor Poulet. The island did not become Catholic, with numerous anti-Papists still in position.^{:79}

During the reign of Elizabeth I, Calvinism took hold in Jersey due to the immigration of French Huguenot refugees. This meant that life became very austere: laws were strictly enforced, punishment for wrong doers was severe, but education was improved – a school was started in every parish and support was given for Jersey boys to attend Oxford. Each elder knew every family within his vingtaine, 'whether they have household prayers morning and evening, say grace after meals and live in peace and concord.' The excommunication of Elizabeth by the Pope increased the military threat to the island and the increasing use of gunpowder on the battlefield meant that the fortifications on the island had to be adapted. A new fortress was built to defend St Aubin's Bay, the new Elizabeth Castle was named after the queen by Sir Walter Raleigh when he was governor. The island militia was reorganised on a parish basis and each parish had two cannon which were usually housed in the church – one of the St Peter cannon can still be seen at the bottom of Beaumont Hill.

In 1540, there was an outbreak of plague on the island, and the Lieutenant Governor, Robert Raymond, ordered the closure of all markets, fairs and public assemblies.^{:70}

In 1541, the Privy Council, which had recently given a seat to Calais, intended to give two seats in Parliament to Jersey. Seymour, the Lieutenant-Governor of the Island, wrote to the Jurats, instructing them to send two Burgesses for the isle. However, no further steps seemed to have been taken since the letter did not arrive in front of the States Assembly until the day the elected persons were required to arrive in London.^{:70}

=== Jersey's role in early colonialism ===
During the Elizabethan Era, Europeans began to explore and establish colonies in the Americas. The Jèrriais were no exception to this. Jersey was a notable trading port, on the route linking the Netherlands to Spain and between England and France. A number of locals were colonialists to Newfoundland from its discovery by Europeans in 1497. By 1591, Jerseymen were sailing small boats across the Atlantic in the spring and not returning to the island until the autumn ploughing. In 1611, St Brelade's Church was allowed to hold Communion early, such that the travellers could communicate before sailing from St Aubin. Southampton was also an important port for the Jersey people, with a number of them settling and taking important roles in the town.

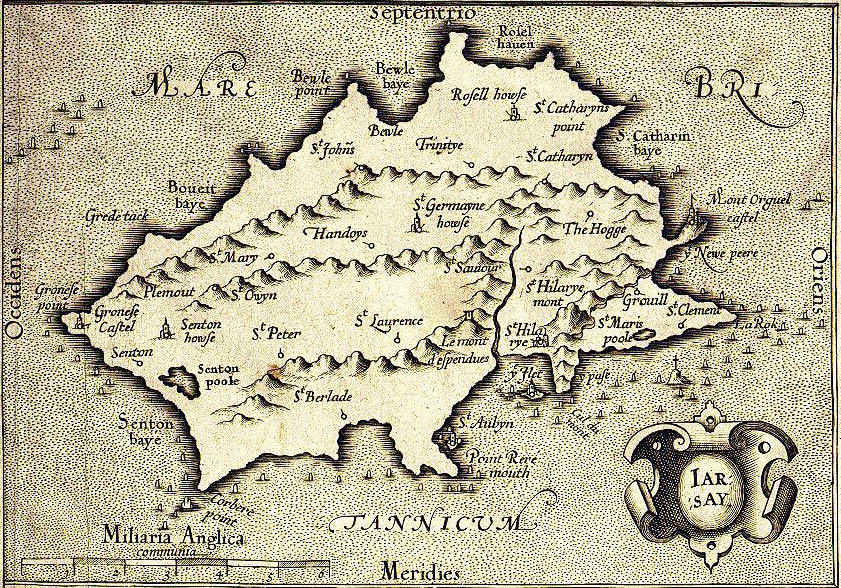
This map of Jersey, published in 1639, shows interior details such as Le Mont ès Pendus (the gallows hill, now called Westmount). At first sight, the coastline appears wildly inaccurate, but if the image is rotated a little clockwise, the shape becomes much closer to what is known today.

One of the favourable trade deals with England was the ability to import wool (England needing an export market but was at war with most of Europe). The production of knitwear in the island reached such a scale that it threatened the island's ability to produce its own food, so laws were passed regulating who could knit with whom and when. The name jersey being synonymous for a sweater, shows its importance.

== 17th century ==
=== Governorship of John Peyton (1603–1620) ===
James VI of Scotland became King of England, and hence of Jersey, after the death of Elizabeth I in 1603. The Governor of the time, Walter Ralegh, was tried and imprisoned for conspiring against the King after the death of Elizabeth and replaced with Sir John Peyton. Peyton strongly disliked Presbyterianism, including Calvinism, and attempted to abolish the religion in Jersey. The king initially allowed the island's to continue under their present faith system. However, Calvinism was increasingly unpopular among islanders, which aided Peyton's caused. When St Peter's rectory became vacant in 1613, Peyton appointed Elie Messervy to the position. The Colloquy called a Synod to meet to discuss, however Peyton banned the meeting. Both sides sent parties to Westminster – the Colloquy sending George Poulet, the Bailiff – however a compromise was found locally, with Messervy agreeing to continue using the Huguenot prayer book.

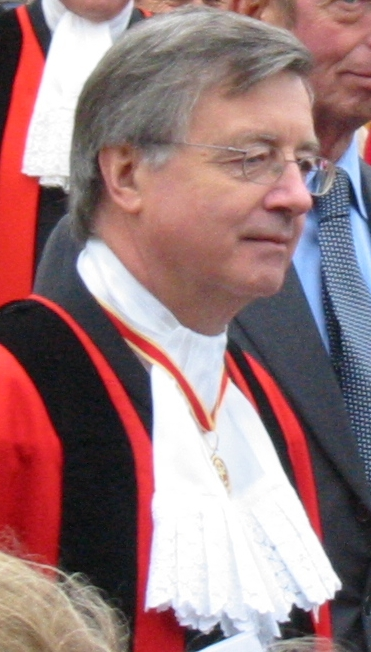
To this day, the tradition that the Bailiff wears red robes remains.

Peyton was also against democracy in the form of the States and the freedoms of the Courts in Jersey. In 1615, Jean Hérault was appointed Bailiff by the King, having been promised the role by letters patent in 1611. Peyton disputed this appointment, claiming it was the Governor's jurisdiction to appoint the Bailiff. Hérault asserted it was the King's jurisdiction to directly appoint the Bailiff. An Order in Council (dated 9 August 1615) sided with Hérault, which Hérault took to claim the Bailiff was the real head of government and the Governor was simply a military officer. Hérault took steps to assert the precedence of the Bailiff over Governor: he ordered his name to be placed before the Governor's in church prayers and was the first Bailiff to wear red robes (in the style of English judges). To back his claims, he cited that in the Norman administrative tradition, the Bailiffs had "noone above them except the Duke". He frequently reported neglect of duty by Peyton, such as the reduction in the guard at Elizabeth Castle.

This dispute led to one of the most major turning points in Jersey's constitutional history, as the division of powers between the Governor and Bailiff were clearly demarcated. Though the Privy Council did not agree with Hérault's extreme position on the precedence of the Bailiff, on 18 February 1617 it declared that the "charge of military forces be wholly in the Governor, and the care of justice and civil affairs in the Bailiff." This secured for both the Bailiff and the States precedence over the Governor on justice and civil affairs, the constitutional precedent which limits the involvement of the Lieutenant-Governor in domestic affairs today.

In 1617, the Royal Commissioners Sir Edward Conway and Sir William Bird visited the island. This led to the recommendation that the island should have a Dean. The appointment was David Bandinel, the Italian Rector of St Brelade's, taking office in 1620. This was not popular with the States, with some Rectors stating they would not recognise the position of the Dean. He took office nonetheless and, by order of the King, Anglicanism was hence effectively established as the state religion of the island. The Book of Discipline lost its validity and the prayer book was changed to a translated version of the Book of Common Prayer, and all future Ministers had to be appointed from then on by a Bishop. Bandinel enforced these changes, including removing the Rector of St Mary from office for speaking against the prayer book, however the order that Communion should be taken kneeling was not.

Aside from religion, the Commissioners also ordered that the island's garrisons be increased and for better training for the militia. They did not recognise the Bailiff as being the island's true Governor, ordering that the States must receive permission from the Governor before being permitted to meet, however did also affirm the precedence of the Bailiff in the civil administrative spheres.

=== Wars of the Three Kingdoms (1646–1651) ===
During the 1640s, England, Ireland and Scotland were embroiled in the War of the Three Kingdoms. The civil war also divided Jersey, and while the sympathy of islanders lay with Parliament, the de Carterets (particularly Sir George Carteret and Sir Philippe de Carteret II) held the island for the king. The Prince of Wales, the future Charles II visited the island in 1646 and again in October 1649 following the trial and execution of his father, Charles I. In the Royal Square in St. Helier on 17 February 1649, Charles was publicly proclaimed king after his father's death (following the first public proclamation in Edinburgh on 5 February 1649). Parliamentarian forces eventually captured the island in 1651 and Elizabeth Castle seven weeks later.

=== Commonwealth and Restoration (1651-1689) ===
The Puritan Col. James Heane was appointed Governor of Jersey in 1651. There were complaints from islanders about the new resident soldiers. Despite the fact that Heane had prohibited looting, many soldiers stole things from islanders and secularised a number of holy buildings, for example burning all the pews in St Helier's church. Many soldiers attending services at the island's churches disrespected services because they could not understand them, as Jersey services were in the local French language. Printed slips were brought from England which Jerseymen were required to sign, swearing allegiance to the 'Republic of England ... without King or House of Lords'.

The Royalist landowners could redeem their land by paying between one and two years' income. However Jersey's system of rentes were complicated from an English perspective and the process of extracting the value of incomes from the landlords was laborious. The Receiver-General stormed because he could not get enough funds for his department, leading to him affronting the Bailiff and being imprisoned in Mont Orgeuil.

There was concern over the new republican Government's powers to reform Jersey's system of governance. At the time, all but one Jurat had been deposed of office and Parliament had prevented any election in the island until it had control of the situation. The Council recommended that the island's government be fully restored, but that all entrusted with public office should be freely elected and not to enjoy continuance for life. However, before the reforms could be implemented, the English Lord Protector Oliver Cromwell dissolved the Long Parliament in 1653. As such, the replacement Parliament recommended that year that ten new Jurats be elected, provided they were loyal to Parliament and to hold office for two years only. However, this new Parliament was also dissolved, so only one Jurat remained. Attempts were also made to incorporate Jersey into England. In 1652, Parliament had treated it as an English county, appointing a county committee, and in 1653, an Instrument decreed that Jersey should send one member to the House of Commons. In the end, the States never met during the nine years of the Commonwealth as the Bailiff, Lemprière, refused to call on the Rectors.

Instead the island was governed by the Royal Court (called L'État or the Court of the Lord Protector). Cromwell directly appointed – as opposed to the islanders electing – eleven Jurats to serve on the Court, however many of these were absent and neither able to govern nor administer justice.

While Charles was proclaimed King in London on 8 May 1660, it was not until 2 June that that news reached the island, and Charles II was proclaimed King for the second time in the Royal Square. In recognition for all the help given to him during his exile, Charles II gave George Carteret, Bailiff and governor, a large grant of land in the American colonies, which he promptly named New Jersey, now part of the United States of America. Furthermore, Charles II presented to the island a royal mace as a 'perpetual remembrance of [the Bailiffs'] fiedelity'; since then, it has always been carried before the Bailiff at sittings of the Royal Court and the States (even during the Occupation).

Another reward given to the island by Charles was the perquages. These are a series of routes that offered sanctuary to malefactors to leave the island. All except St Ouen and St Martin lead to the south coast. For example, St Mary, St John and St Lawrence leave via St Peter's Valley and Beaumont (today a cycle track leading to the south coast). Where a case did not amount to felony, wrongdoers could request to vider le pays, being entitled to nine days of sanctuary in any of the parish churches and then having to leave the island using a perquage route. This theory of the perquages as being routes of sanctuary is disputed. However, it is likely the clergy used these ancient ways to convey outlaws to the sea and records show sanctions for blocking the perquage way.

In 1666, it was reported by English spies in Paris that Louis XIV intended to invade Jersey after his declaration of war with England. The Governor rallied the militia, intent on dying to defend the island, but peace was agreed before any invasion could happen.

In 1673, there were concerns over the growing number of houses on the island. The construction of houses on arable land was putting the island's self-sustenance and food security at risk. Therefore, the States declared that new houses should only be built in St Aubin and Gorey, or where surrounded by 20 vergées of land.

In 1680, the States voted in favour of requesting the island's first dedicated prison be constructed in town in order to be nearer the Royal Court (previously prisoners had been held at Mont Orgueil, the King's tenants in the east being required to guard them). The building arching over Charing Cross (at the time the entrance to town from the west) was completed by 1699, where the prison would remain until its 1811 relocation to the present site of the General Hospital (on Gloucester Street, not at Westmount).

=== Reign of William of Orange (1689–1699) ===
In 1689, William of Orange became the King of England; and England, as a Dutch ally, went to war against the French. Although due to the scale of the war, the island did not come into much focus, it was at this time the Privilege of Neutrality which had long been enjoyed by the islands was lost. William had banned all trade with France, a proclamation which applied to Jersey as well, however due to corruption in the higher levels of Jersey's government, namely the Lieutenant-Governor himself Edward Harris, a large smuggling trade thrived, operating from the bailiwick. Smugglers would be alerted by a fire set by French merchants on the Écrehous reef, a part of Jersey's bailiwick, to which Jersey boats, under the approval of the Lieutenant-Governor, would travel to conduct illegal trade. Despite attempts from parish authorities to stop the boats, the fact that the reef was part of Jersey and that these boats had permission from the government to travel to the islets, no action could be taken.

During William's wars with France, Jersey was on the whole at peace, with the notable exception of 1692, when Louis XIV permitted an army to gather at La Hougue on the Cotentin. James II himself also went to the Cotentin, however Jersey's allegiance was now against the Stuarts. However, in a naval battle in 1692, the French fleet at La Hougue were destroyed. Although the threat of foreign powers was numb during this period, on island tensions were high. The Governors and Bailiffs were generally absent – the Governor Henry Lumley never visited the island at all during his time in office and after the death of Sir Edouard de Carteret, no bailiff was appointed for five years. The eventual successor Charles de Carteret faced large opposition, especially from his own tenants in St. Ouen. A group of jurats complained to the Privy Council that de Carteret was absent and not well accustomed to the law and culture of the island. Charles attempted to oppose this by blocking sittings of the Jurats in court, claiming they could not sit since they were related to the plaintiff or defendant (which they most often were since everyone in Jersey was somehow related to one another). With Charles ended the male line of de Carteret seigneurs.

Towards the end of the 17th century, Jersey strengthened its links with the Americas when many islanders emigrated to New England and north east Canada. The Jersey merchants built up a thriving business empire in the Newfoundland and Gaspé fisheries. Companies such as Robins and the Le Boutilliers set up thriving businesses.

== 18th century ==
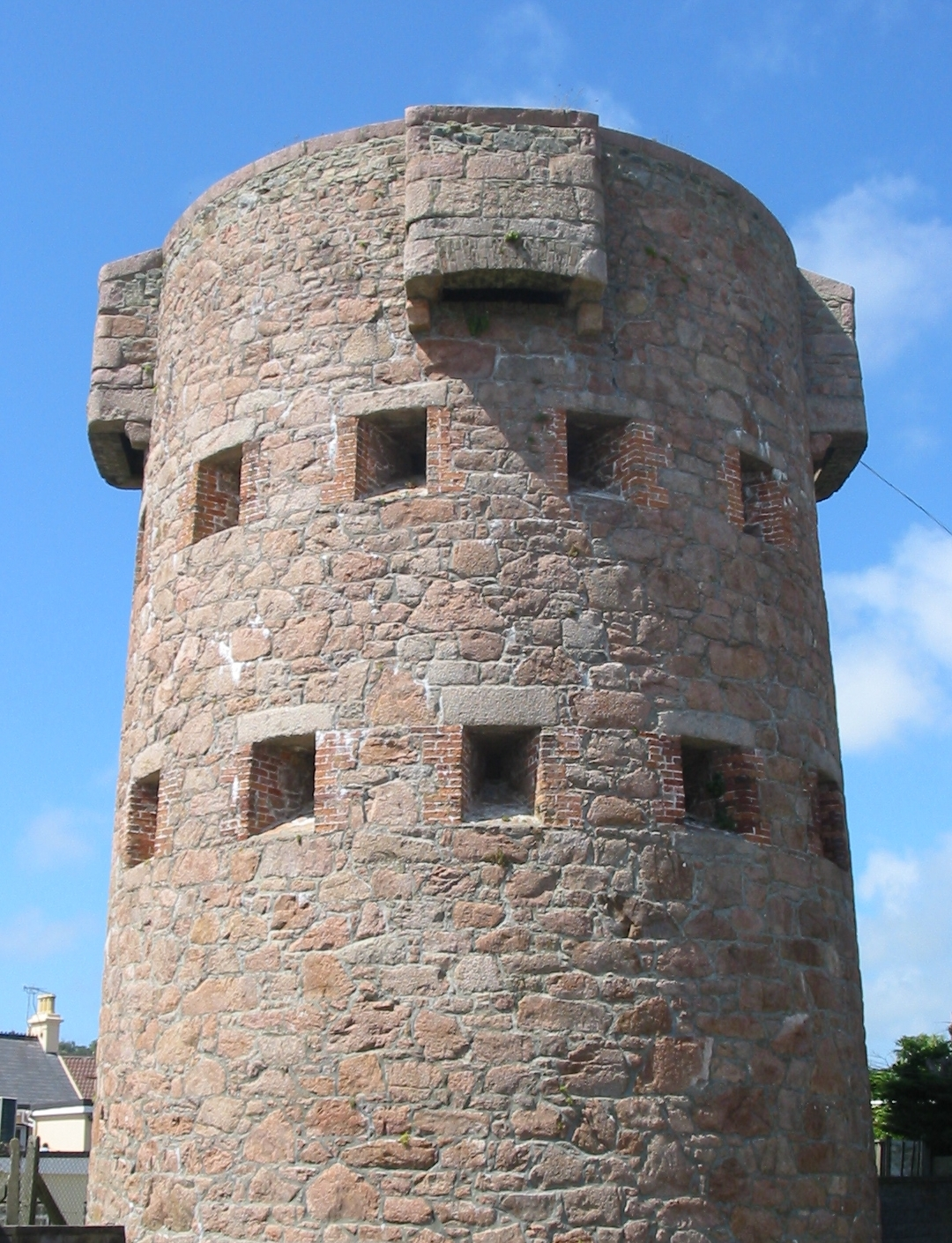
Martello towers were built along the coasts to protect the Island from French attack. Pictured is First Tower on Victoria Avenue.

=== Public unrest in the early century ===
By the 1720s, a discrepancy in coinage values between Jersey and France was threatening economic stability. The States of Jersey therefore resolved to devalue the liard to six to the sou. The legislation to that effect implemented in 1729 caused popular riots that shook the establishment. The devaluation was therefore cancelled.

In the 1730s, there was sporadic violence against the collectors of Crown tithes, especially in St Ouen, St Brelade and Trinity.

=== Corn Riots ===
A revolt, known as the Corn Riots or the Jersey Revolution, occurred in 1769. They were centred around the balance of power between the island's parliament, the States, and the Royal Court, both of which had powers to create legislation. An anti-Seigneurial sentiment – opposition to the feudal economic system – also contributed to the popular revolt. The spark for the riots was a corn shortage, in part caused by corruption in the ruling classes, led by the Lieutenant Bailiff Charles Lemprière, whose style of rule was authoritarian.

On 28 September 1769, men from the northern parishes marched into town and rioted, including breaking into the Royal Court in a threatening manner. The States retreated to Elizabeth Castle and called on the Privy Council for help under false pretences. The Council sent five companies of Royal Scots, who discovered the islanders' grievances.

The protestors demands include reductions in price of wheat and the abolition of certain, or all, Seigneurial privileges. In reaction, the Crown issued the Code of 1771, which attempted to separate the island's judiciary and legislature. The Code codified Jersey's laws and removed lawmaking powers from the Royal Court. While the abolition of the Seigneurial system was not achieved, tighter restrictions were placed on the collection of Crown revenues.

=== Politics and religion in the 18th century ===
The Chamber of Commerce founded 24 February 1768 is the oldest English-speaking Chamber of Commerce.

The late 18th century was the first time political parties in some form came into existence on the island. Jean Dumaresq was an early Liberal who called for democratic reforms (that the States should be democratically elected Deputies and should have vested in them executive power). His supporters were known as Magots ("maggots", initially an insult from his opponents, which the Magots reclaimed as their own term) and his opponents as the Charlots (supporters of the Lieutenant Baliff Charles Lempière). Dumaresq is quoted as saying "we shall make these Seigneurs bite the dust". In 1776, he was elected as Connétable for St Peter.^{:200}

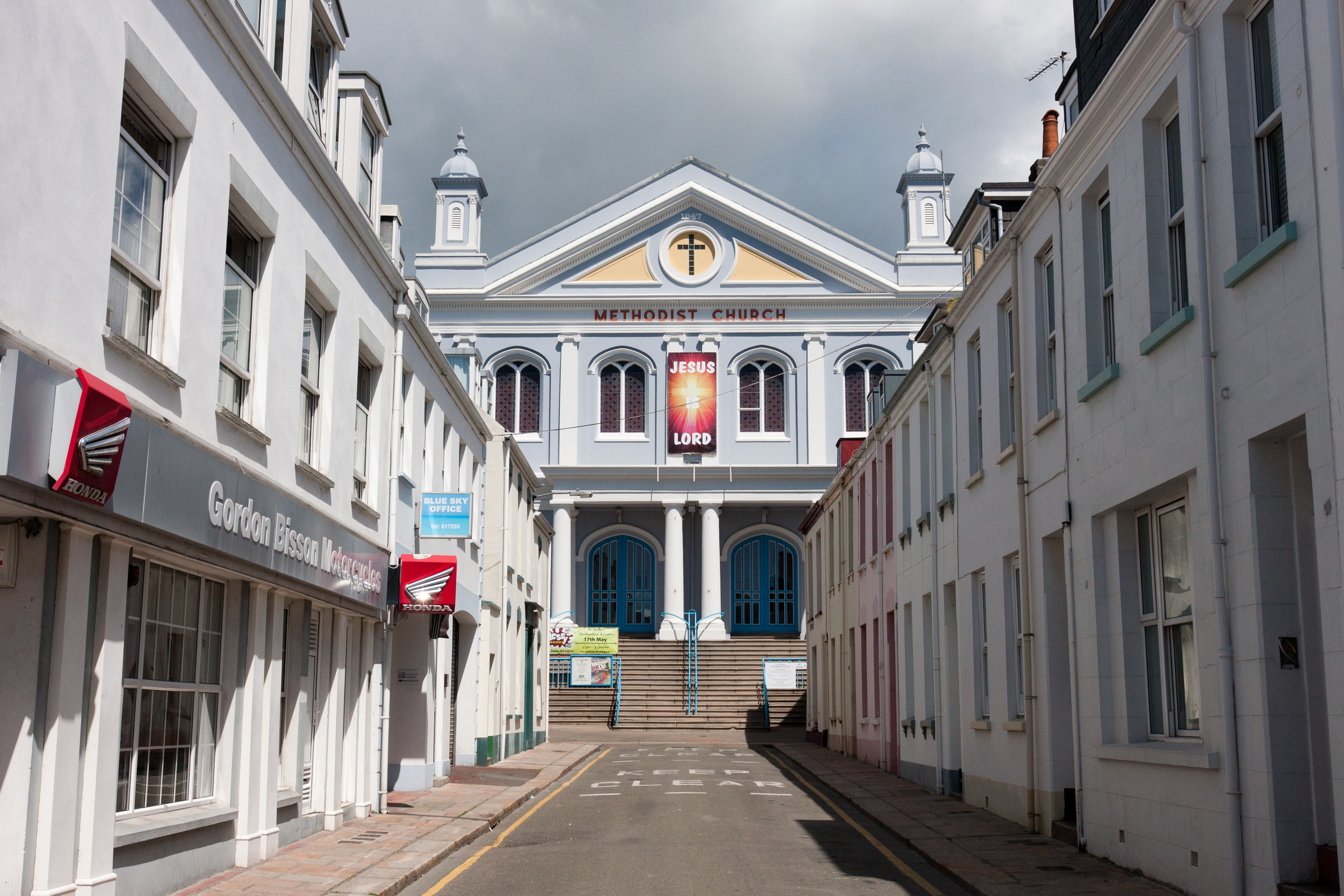
Wesley's legacy remains in Jersey today. The Methodist Centre in St Helier in 2012.

Methodism arrived in Jersey in 1774, brought by fishermen returning from Newfoundland. Conflict with the authorities ensued when men refused to attend militia drill when that coincided with chapel meetings. The Royal Court attempted to proscribe Methodist meetings, but King George III refused to countenance such interference with liberty of religion. The first Methodist minister in Jersey was appointed in 1783, and John Wesley preached in Jersey in August 1789, his words being interpreted into the vernacular for the benefit of those from the country parishes. The first building constructed specifically for Methodist worship was erected in St. Ouen in 1809.

=== Battle of Jersey ===
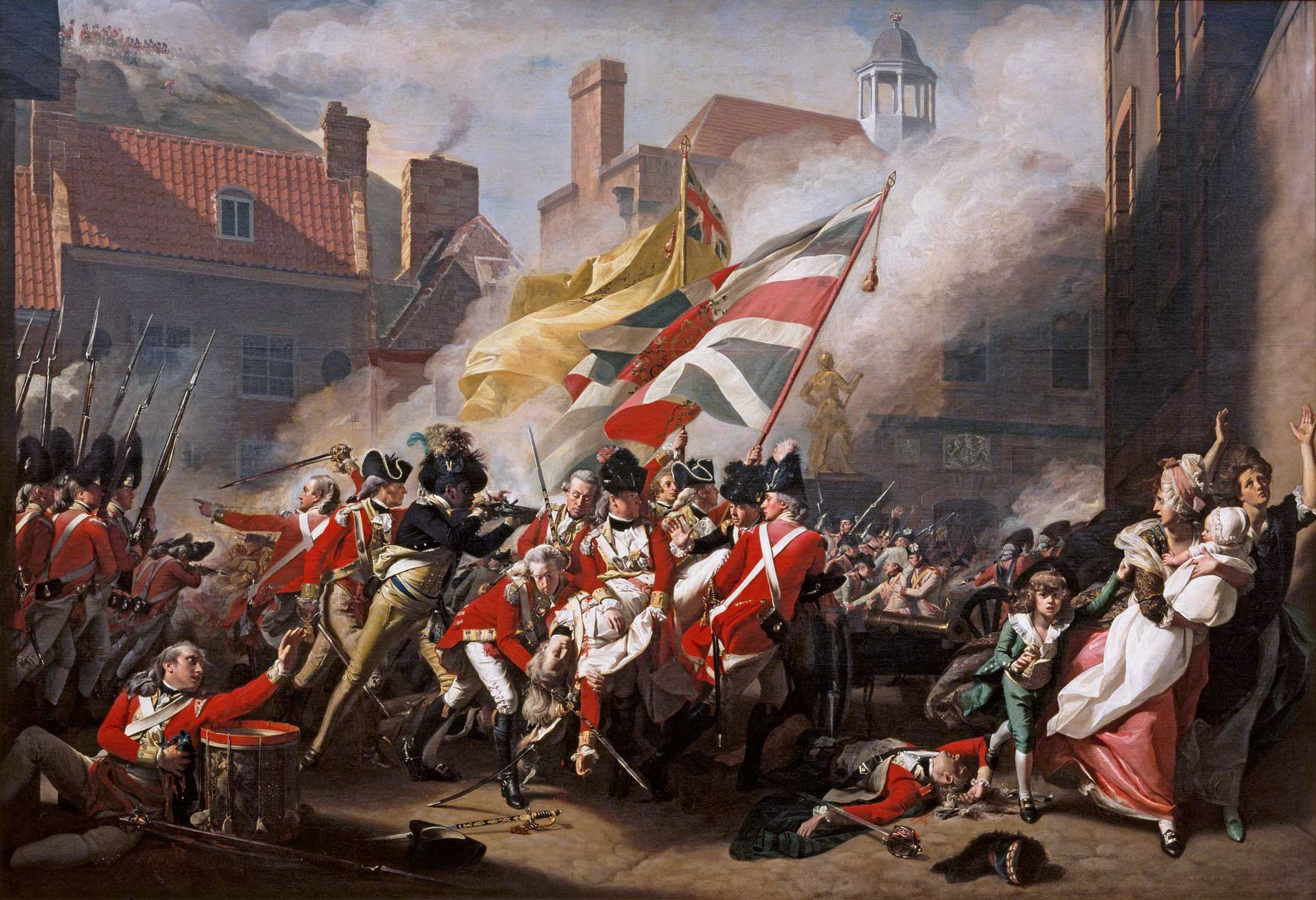
The Death of Major Peirson, John Singleton Copley, 1782–1784.

The 18th century was a period of political tension between Britain and France, as the two nations clashed all over the world as their ambitions grew. Because of its position, Jersey was more or less on a continuous war footing.

During the American Wars of Independence, two attempted invasions of the island were made. In 1779, the Prince of Nassau-Siegen was prevented from landing at St Ouen's Bay; on 6 January 1781, a force led by Baron de Rullecourt captured St Helier in a daring dawn raid, but was defeated by a British army led by Major Francis Peirson in the Battle of Jersey. A short-lived peace was followed by the French Revolutionary Wars and the Napoleonic Wars which, when they had ended, had changed Jersey forever. In 1799–1800, over 6000 Russian troops under the command of Charles du Houx de Vioménil were quartered in Jersey after an evacuation of Holland.

=== After the Battle ===
The end of war with France and America saw the growth of trade between Jersey and the New World, especially Canada and Newfoundland. By 1763, around a third of the fish being exported from Conception Bay was carried by Jersey vessels. In the 1780s, a number of Jersey families settled permanently, such as the de Quettevilles in Forteau, Labrador. The first printing press was introduced to Jersey in 1784.

Anti-seigneurial attitudes remained in Jersey, despite the reforms of 1771. In 1785, an anti-seigneurial document containing 36 articles was included in St Ouen's Parish Assembly minutes. It included demands for reform such as the abolition of Seigneurial services and an end to the seizure of goods following bankruptcy. These demands were paralleled in St Helier and St John and by an article in La Gazette, the only newspaper at the time. These demands formed the basis for a sustained anti-feudal struggle during the next century.

== 19th century ==
The 19th century saw massive changes in Jersey society. A large influx of immigrants from England made Jersey a more connected island than ever before, and brought with it cultural changes and the desire for political reform. During this period, the States reformed to become more representative of the population and the Jersey culture became more anglicised and less religious. The island also grew economically and the built-up areas of the island expanded, especially St Helier, with the development of public transport on the island.

=== Pre-Victoria ===
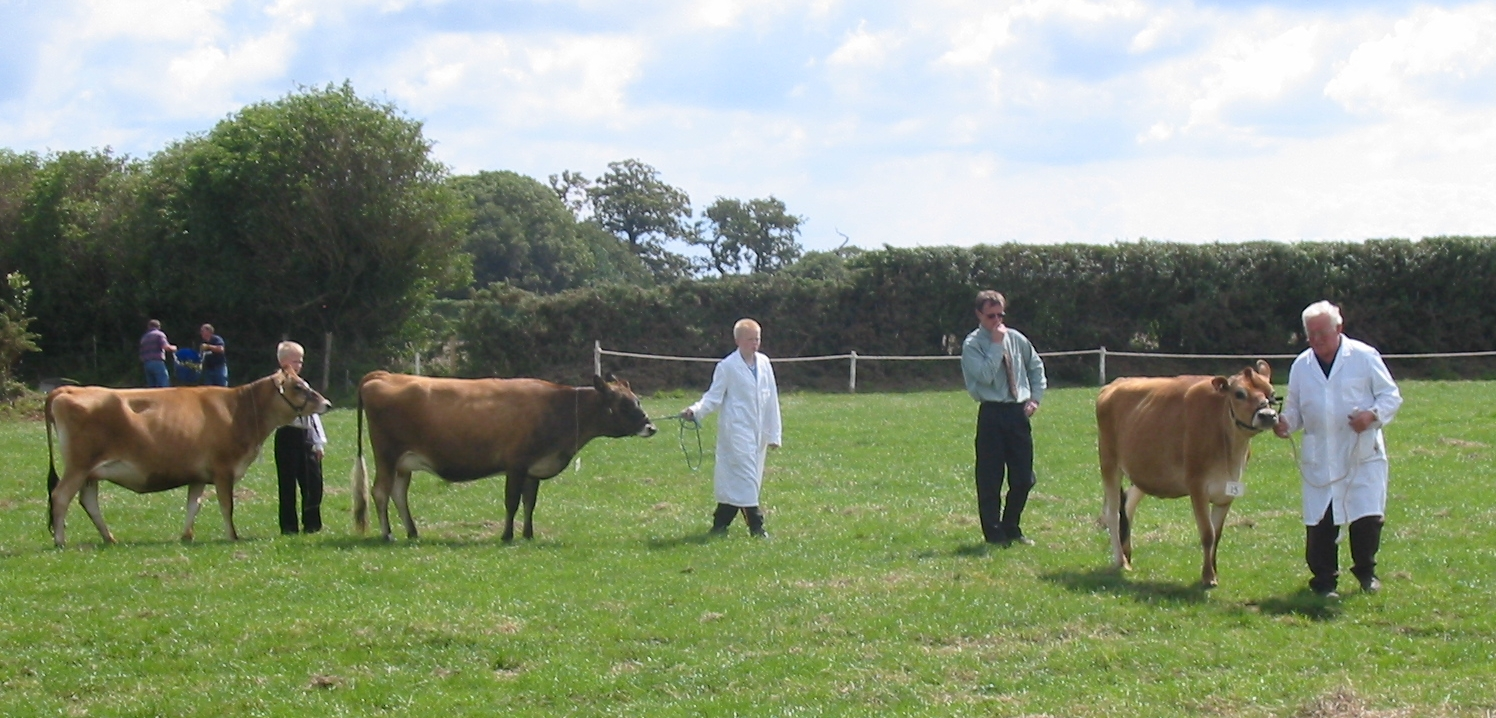
Jersey cattle were developed as a breed during the 19th century. Judging the quality of cows remains a feature of rural life.

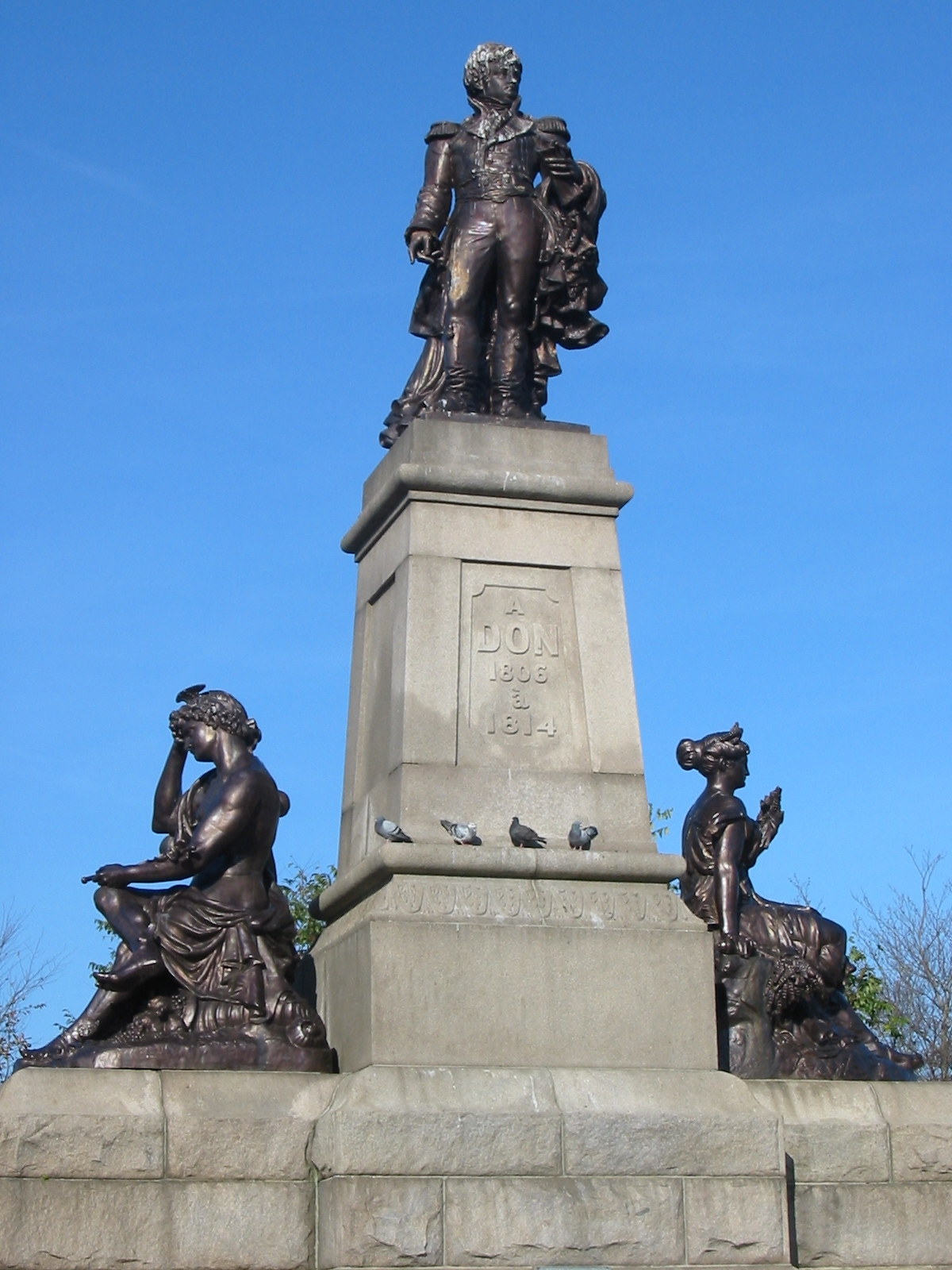
The statue to General Don in the Parade

The pre-existing road network was an intricate network of roads and lanes. During the nineteenth century, many parishes took on the administration of more and more of these lanes. The network was criticised at the time for being subpar. A common Jèrriais saying is Vieux comme les Quémins, which means 'as old as the roads'. In the early 19th century, the military roads were constructed (on occasion at gunpoint in the face of opposition from landowners) by the governor, General George Don, to link coastal fortifications with the town harbour. Much of the opposition to the plans came from islanders, who thought the country's best defence was its convoluted network of narrow lanes. The new road system was met with considerable opposition, particularly due to its expense. The St Helier Parish Assembly forbade the completion of the Trinity main road within its boundaries. The new network allowed greater communication between disparate parts of the island. These had an unexpected effect on agriculture once peace restored reliable trade links. Farmers in previously isolated valleys were able to swiftly transport crops grown in the island's microclimate to waiting ships and then on to the markets of London and Paris ahead of the competition. In conjunction with the later introduction of steamships and the development of the French and British railway systems, Jersey's agriculture was no longer as isolated as before.

The early 19th century was a period of growth of trade for Jersey. In the wake of the Napoleonic wars after the defeat of France in 1815, the Channel Islands lost their strategic value, as points of conflict between the British and foreign powers moved to the North Sea. The UK had a need to reduce its forces to cut spending, but the Channel Islands defence costs reached £500,000 pa, even in peacetime. The utility of possessing the islands came into question. John Ramsay McCulloch described the advantages the islands provided to the UK as "neither very obvious nor material". However, in 1845, the Duke of Wellington strongly defended the islands in the Memorandum on the Defence of the United Kingdom.

An English Custom House was established in the island in 1810. A key turning point in Jersey history was the introduction of steamships. Previous to that, travel to the island was long and unpredictable. In the mid-1820s, the post office switched to steam as well. The first paddle steamer to visit Jersey was the Medina on 11 June 1823. In 1824, two shipping companies were established, each operating weekly steamship services to England.

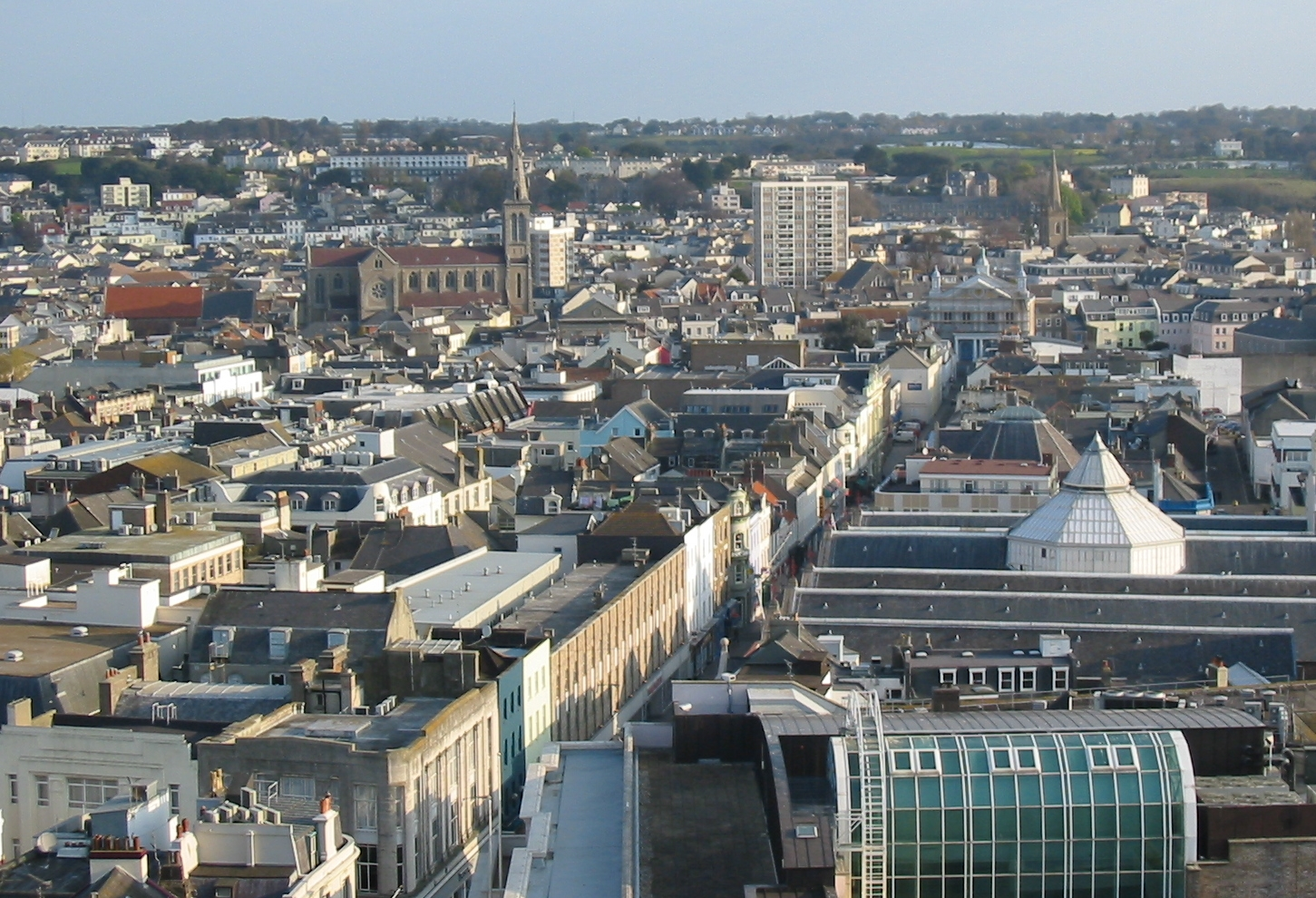
A view over St Helier in 2008. During the 19th century, St Helier saw significant expansion to the north.

This brought thousands of passengers to the country. By 1840, there were 5,000 English residents, who some say did not mix well or interact deeply with the native Jèrriais. The number of English-speaking soldiers stationed in the island and the number of retired officers and English-speaking labourers who came to the islands in the 1820s led to the island gradually moving towards an English-speaking culture in town. This new immigration had a large impact on local architecture, with a number of mainland Georgian-style houses and terraces erected on the main roads out of St Helier. The town also expanded with many new streets, such as Burrard Street, first developed in 1812. In 1831, street lighting was first used. In 1843 it was agreed to erect street names. The rapid growth of St. Helier was one of the most significant changes in the landscape of Jersey during the 19th century. The town developed from a small settlement by the coast to encompassing most of the parish and spreading out into St. Clement and St. Saviour.

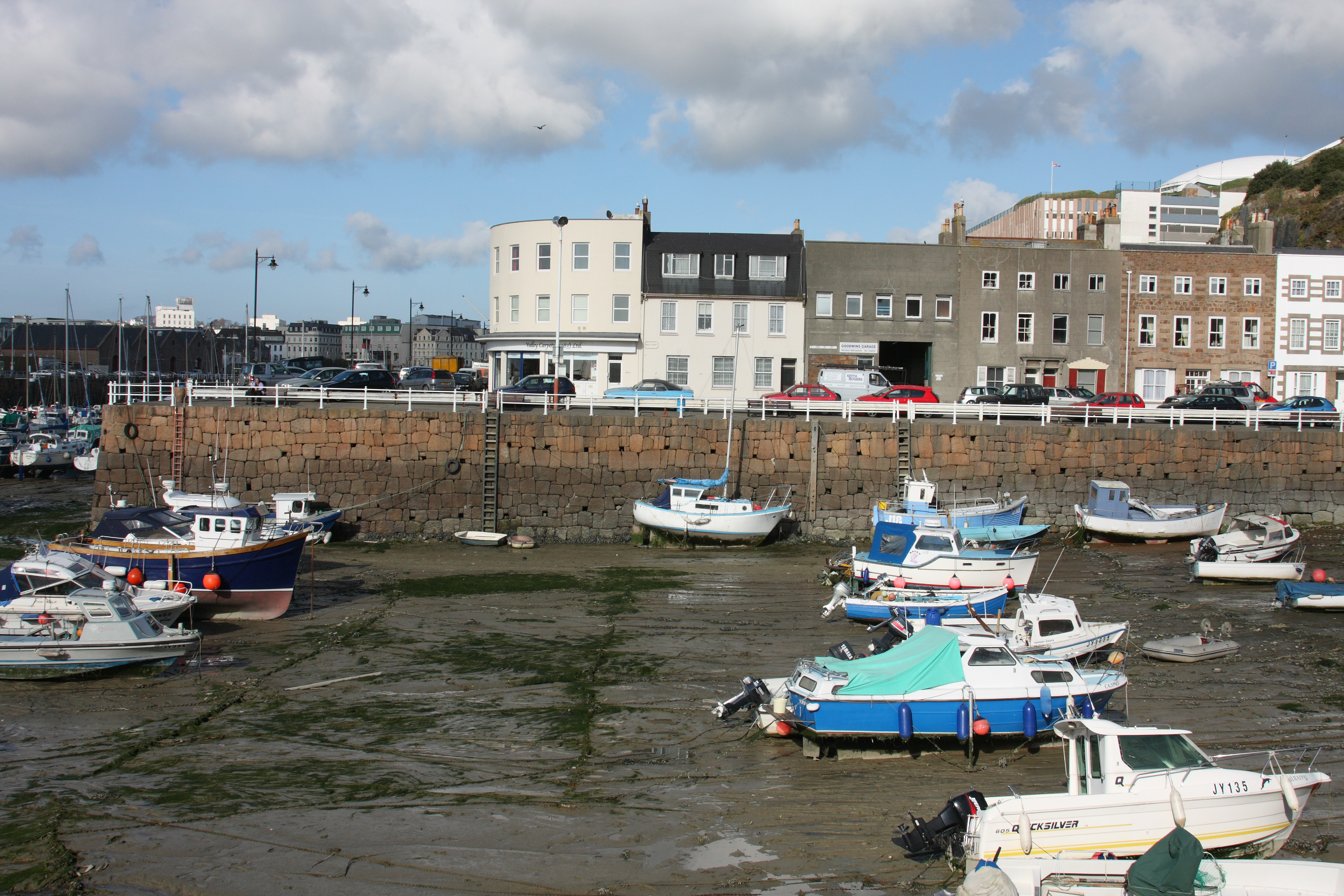
The English harbour was the first permanent harbour to be constructed in town.

An important growth for St Helier in the early 19th century was the construction of the harbour. Previously, ships coming into the town had only a small jetty at the site now called the English Harbour and the French Harbour. The Chamber of Commerce urged the States to build a new harbour, but the States refused, so the Chamber took it into their own hands and paid to upgrade the harbour in 1790. A new breakwater was constructed to shelter the jetty and harbours. In 1814, the merchants constructed the roads now known as Commercial Buildings and Le Quai des Marchands to connect the harbours to the town and in 1832 construction was finished on the Esplanade and its sea wall. A rapid expansion in shipping led the States in 1837 to order the construction of two new piers: the Victoria and Albert Piers.

=== A new island politics ===
The post-Napoleonic War period was a divisive period politically for the island. In 1821, there was an election for Jurat. The St Laurentine Laurelites (conservatives, the eventual name for the Charlots) attacked the Inn in their village where Rose men (the progressive descendants of the Magots) were holding a meeting. They damaged the building and injured both the innkeeper and his wife. On election day in St Martin, a number of Rose voters were attacked, after which most Rose men refrained from voting. Although the Rose candidate won overall, he faced a number of lawsuits over claims of voter fraud, so in the end the Laurel candidate George Bertram took office.^{:232}

At this time, the national administration system, despite reform, still resembled a feudal system of governance. They also remained dominated by judicial and legislative overlap. In the nineteenth century, the growth of the town shifted economic power from the country parishes to St Helier, where also resided a large English population. During this century, Jersey's power structure shifted from the English Crown to the Jersey States, establishing Jersey as a near-independent state, however ultimate authority over the island shifted from the Crown to the British Parliament, aligning with the shift in the UK's politics towards a purely ceremonial monarch. The Privy Council put pressure of the island to reform its institutions, in the belief these reforms should align the country with a more English model of government and law. In 1883, John Stuart Blackie recounted an Englishman's comment that only one thing was needed to make Jersey perfect, and that was "a full participation in the benefits of English law". However, the Lieutenant Governor at the time stated that the absence of English law was what had brought Jerseymen such prosperity.

Many locals blamed this push for reform on the island's new immigrants, who were unaccustomed to the island's distinct political and legal systems (although a major part of the mainstream reformer movement was in fact made of Jerseymen). Many English who had moved to the island discovered an alien environment, with unfamiliar laws (in a foreign language they could not understand) and no recourse to access the local power to counter them. The reformers of English heritage mostly came from the middle classes, and sought to further their own rights, not necessarily those of the working class. These Englishmen formed a pressure group known as the Civil Assembly of St Helier. This group was effectively split into two, one organised around Abraham Le Cras' hard-code English reformism and the other, a larger looser corpus of English reformists. The former was never representative of a significant proportion of the English community. One thing both shared however was a belief that the English systems were far superior to the historic Norman-based structures.

Abraham Le Cras was an outspoken new resident – though with Jersey heritage – opposed to Jersey's self-government. He not only thought Jersey should be integrated into England fully, but disputed the right of the States to even make its own laws. He is noted as saying, 'the States have no more power to make laws for Jersey than I have'. In 1840 he won a court case challenging the States' ability to naturalise people as citizens. The Privy Council determined that the long-standing precedent of the States doing so had been invalidated since Jersey had been ruled under civil law since 1771. In 1846, he persuaded the MP for Bath to push for a Parliamentary Committee to enquire into the law of Jersey, however HM Government instead promised a Royal Commission. The Commission advised the abolition of the Royal Court run by the Jurats and the replacement of it with three Crown-appointed judges and the introduction of a paid police force. Le Cras left the island to live in England in 1850.

In 1852, the island experienced somewhat of a constitutional crisis when the Privy Council issued three Orders in Council: establishing a police court, a petty debts court and a paid police force for St Helier. This sparked controversy locally, with claims that the move threatened Jersey's independence. Both parties united against the move and around 7000 islanders signing a petition. By 1854, the council had agreed to revoke the Orders, on the condition that the States passed most of the council's requirements. In 1856, further constitutional reform brought deputies into the States for the first time, with one deputy from each country parish and three from town.

The threats to Jersey's autonomy continued. In the 1860s, there was raised a threat of an intervention in the island's government by the British Parliament itself, in order to impose change on the island's structures.

=== Nonconformism and reform ===
Nonconformity challenged traditional Jersey society from within; it had always been a part of Jersey life, and non-conformists such as the Methodists had generally been tolerated during peacetime. This isn't to say there weren't some tensions between the Established Church and non-conformists, but these were generally exceptional. Most country people had at least one non-conformist within their own family, so the othering of non-conformists never took much hold. However, non-conformists were often unable to fully participate in country life as the church played a central role in the secular parish, and were notably absent from honorary roles within the parish. The Established Church had to reassess itself and reform and the parish structure altered itself to become a more civil-focused organisation, preserving itself while allowing its community more religious freedom.

=== Anglicisation ===
At the start of the 19th century, Jersey people as a nation were British, rather French nor Norman. Due to the cultural divergence between the Island and the Norman mainland, relationships between individual Islanders and Frenchmen were less common. Due to an increase in French immigrants, the differences between the Islanders and the French became more apparent, and thus France and the French people were seen as foreign to the Island's population. Furthermore, increased links between Jersey and mainland Britain, such as through the improvement of St Helier's shipping capabilities and an increase in mainland Brits, made Jersey a more British nation.

This led to a change in the linguistic demography in the Island. In the early parts of the century, mostly due to increased immigration from the rest of the British Isles, the town became a predominantly English-speaking place, though bilingualism was still common. This created a divided linguistic geography, as the people of the countryside continued to use Jèrriais, and many did not even know English. English became seen as 'the language of commercial success and moral and intellectual achievement'.

The growth of English and the decline of French brought about the adoption of more values and social structures from Victorian England. From 1912, the new compulsory education was delivered solely in English, following the cultural norms, and teaching subjects from the perspective, of England. Eventually, this has led to the Island's culture becoming anglicised and much of the traditional Norman-based culture of the Island being disregarded or lost. Kelleher identifies anglicisation as a challenge Le Feuvre argues that this cultural change created a sense of inferiority about native Jersey culture and the language – viewed as a 'corruption, rather than an improvement' of Standard French by the English immigrant population – which only served to accelerate the process of anglicisation.

Anglicisation was supported by the British state. It was suggested that, although the islands had proven themselves loyal to the British Sovereign, that this was out of hereditary impression, rather than affinity towards the English people, and that anglicisation would not only encourage loyalty and congeniality between the nations, but also provide economic prosperity and improved "general happiness". In 1846, through a lens of growing nationalism in the UK, there was concern against sending young islanders to France for education, where they might bring French principles, friendships and views of policy and government to the British Islands. The Jersey gentry adopted this policy of anglicisation, due to the social and economic benefits it would bring. Anglophiles such as John Le Couteur strove to introduce England to Jersey. In 1856, the Jersey Times, an English-language newspaper, was established in Jersey. The use of the English language in the States was first suggested by the Rev. Abraham Le Sueur of Grouville in 1880.

=== Victorian Era (1837–1901) ===
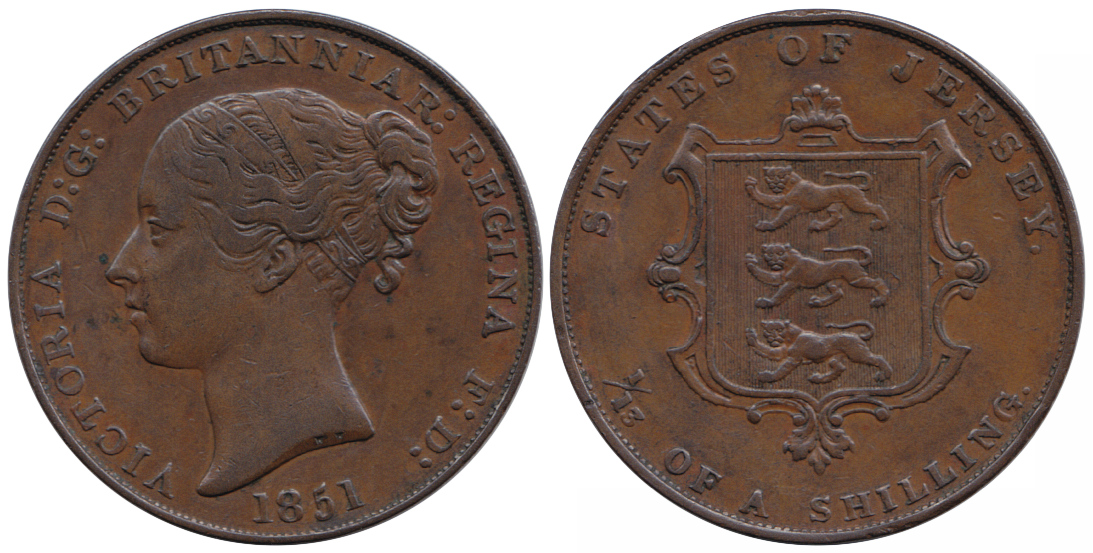
A Victorian 1/13 shilling coin issued in 1851

Queen Victoria was crowned Queen of the United Kingdom in the right of Jersey in 1837. The first notable event of the Victorian era for Jersey was the change in currency. The livre tournois had been used as the legal currency for centuries, however it had been abolished during the French Revolutionary period. Although the coins were no longer minted, they remained the legal currency in Jersey until 1837, when dwindling supplies and consequent difficulties in trade and payment obliged the adoption of the pound sterling as legal tender. Keen to prevent a repeat of the Six-sou Revolt, the authorities wanted to ensure a fair exchange rate; 520 sous would be the equivalent of one Pound sterling. Jersey issued its first coins in 1841, including the 1/13 shilling coin, which was closer in value to the old sou than the English penny.

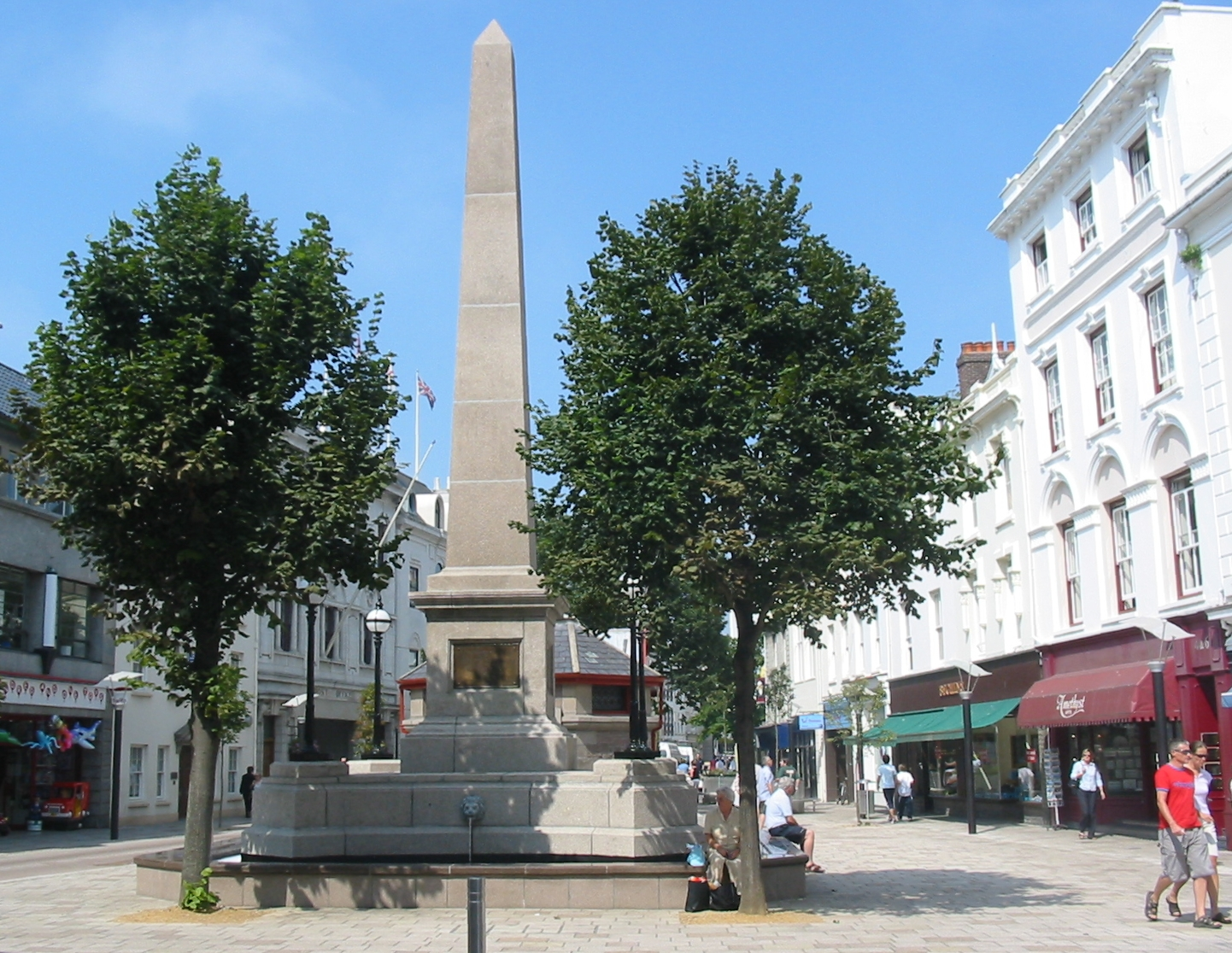
The obelisk to Le Sueur

In the 1840s, the Rose leader Pierre Le Sueur was elected as Connétable of St Helier. From 1845, he orchestrated the construction of a complete sewer system for the town. He remained in office for 15 years and on his death an obelisk was erected in the Broad Street square.

The population of Jersey rose rapidly, from 47,544 in 1841 to 56,078 20 years later, despite a 20% mortality rate amongst new born children. Life expectancy was 35 years. Both immigration and emigration increased. In 1851, the English immigrant population numbered around 12,000, compared with a total island population of 57,000 people. In St Helier, they constituted 7,000 of the parish's 30,000 residents. As with in England, the English community in Jersey was not coherent, but divided by social class. At the top of the social ladder were those of independent means, who chose to retire in the island: they did not participate much in the local lifestyle or politics, instead creating a mini-English social life for themselves. While at the bottom, there was the English-born working class, who often lacked basic rights such as accessing welfare.

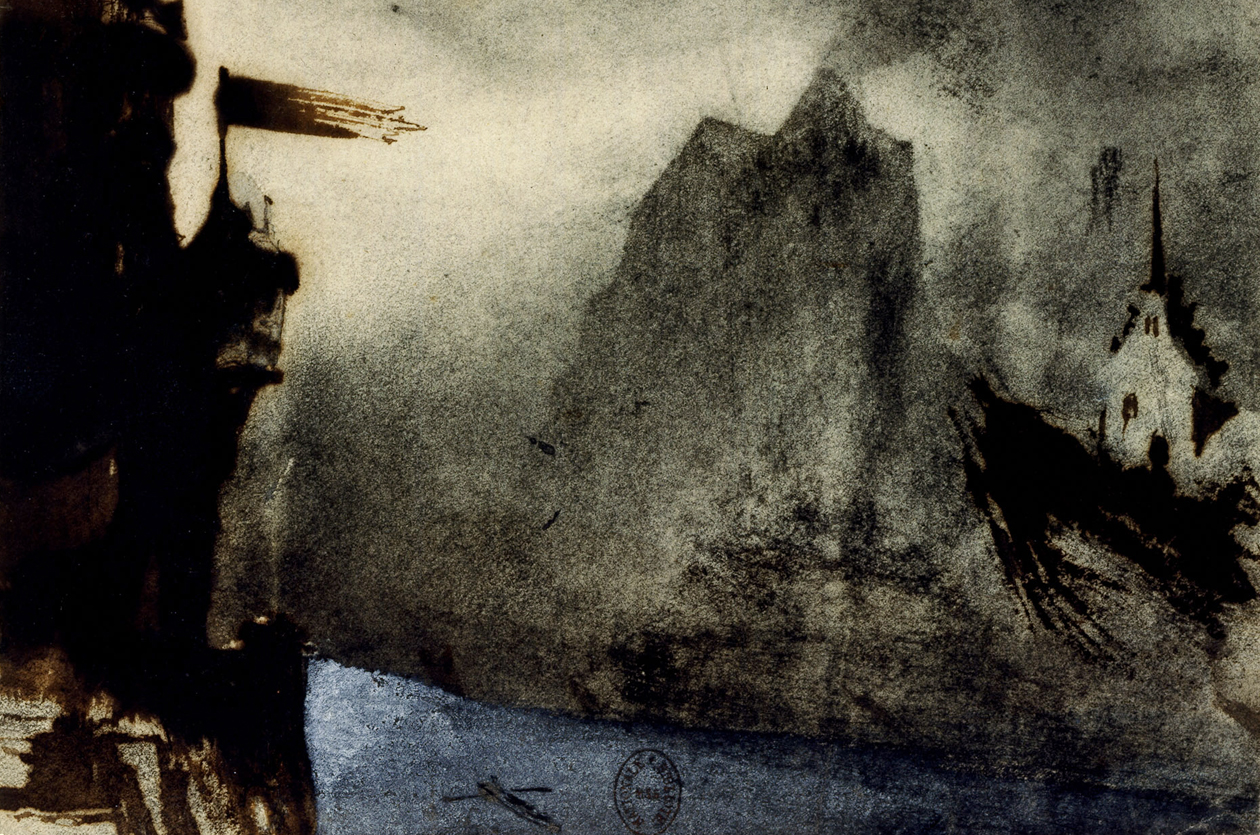
The Hermitage Rock, St. Helier, Jersey amidst a fantastic landscape – by Victor Hugo (1855)

In 1852, the French author and poet Victor Hugo arrived to seek refuge in Jersey, as had many other revolutionaries and socialists from the Continent, facing exile from France and Belgium. If any of these proscrits died on the island, they were buried in Macpela cemetery in Sion, St John. In 1855, these refugees republished in their weekly paper L'Homme an open letter from a number of French socialists living in London, which stated 'You have sacrificed your dignity as a Queen, your fastidiousness as a woman, your pride as an aristocrat, even your honour.' The Lieutenant-Governor banished the three editors two days later. Although Hugo had disapproved of the letter, he joined a protest against the expulsion, and hence too was exiled from the island. He and his family left for Guernsey.

The Theatre Royal was built, as were Victoria College in 1852 and exhibited 34 items at The Great Exhibition in 1851, the world's first ever Pillar box was installed in 1852 and a paid police force was created in 1854.

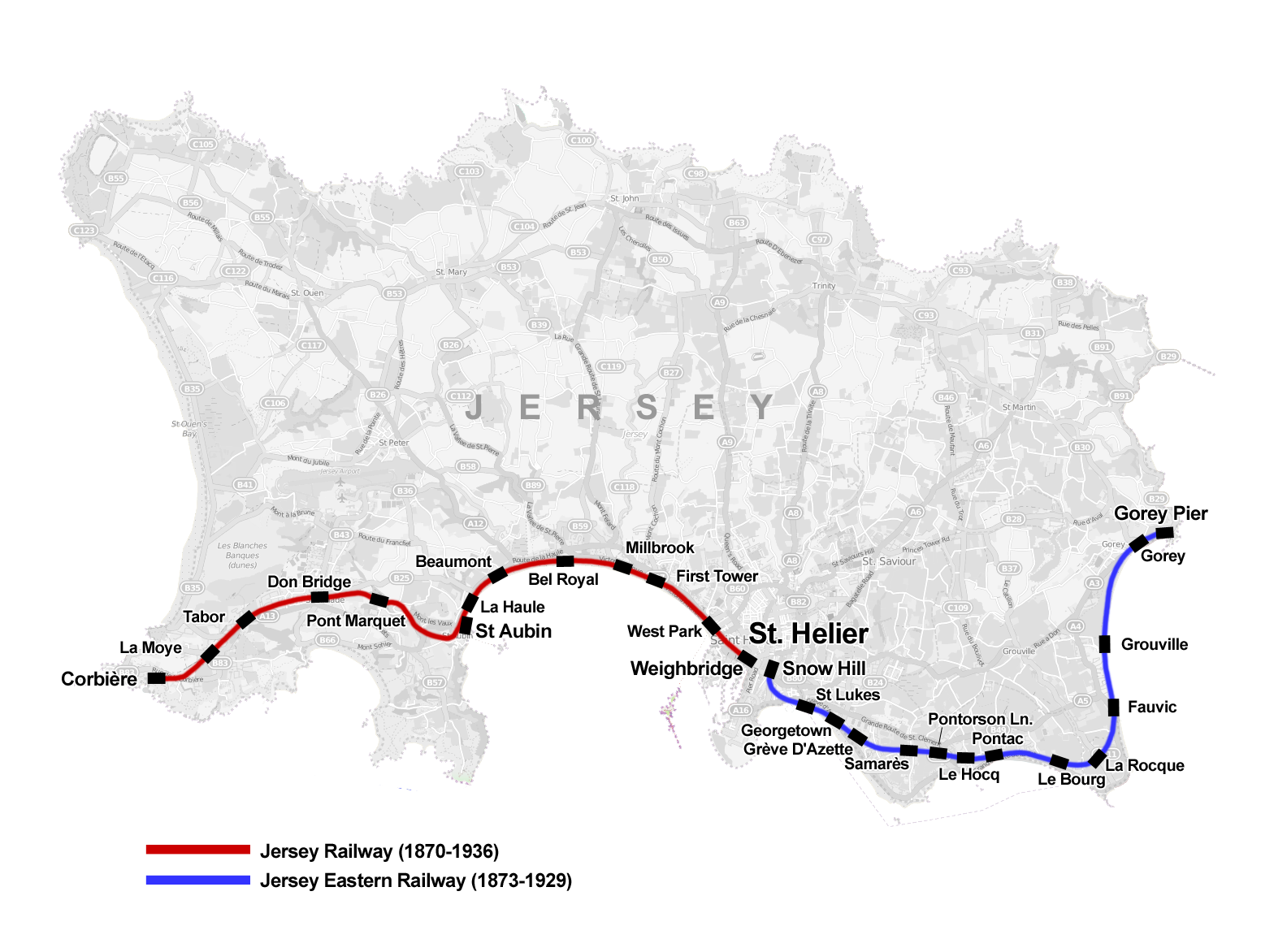
Map of the former railway lines of Jersey

This century saw Jersey develop a public transport network. Towards the end of the last century, omnibuses came into use for the first time in the island. Two railways, the Jersey Western Railway in 1870, and the Jersey Eastern Railway in 1874, were opened. The western railway from St Helier (Weighbridge) to La Corbière and the eastern railway from St Helier (Snow Hill) to Gorey Pier. The two railways were never connected.

Jersey was the fourth-largest shipbuilding area in the 19th-century British Isles, building over 900 vessels around the island. Shipbuilding declined with the coming of iron ships and steam. A number of banks on Jersey, guarantors of an industry both onshore and off, failed in 1873 and 1886, even causing strife and discord in far-flung societies. The population fell slightly in the twenty years to 1881.

In the late 19th century, as the former thriving cider and wool industries declined, island farmers benefited from the development of two luxury products – Jersey cattle and Jersey Royal potatoes. The former was the product of careful and selective breeding programmes; the latter was a total fluke.

The anarchist philosopher, Peter Kropotkin, who visited the Channel Islands in 1890, 1896, and 1903, described the agriculture of Jersey in The Conquest of Bread.

The 19th century also saw the rise of tourism as an important industry (linked with the improvement in passenger ships) which reached its climax in the period from the end of the Second World War to the 1980s.

== 20th century ==
Elementary education became obligatory in 1899, and free in 1907. Queen Victoria died in 1901, and Edward VII was proclaimed as King in the Royal Square. His coronation a year later was marked by the first Battle of Flowers. The years before the First World War saw the foundation of the Jersey Eisteddfod by the Dean of Jersey, Samuel Falle. The first aeroplanes arrived in Jersey in 1912.

In 1914, the British garrison was withdrawn at the start of the First World War and the militia were mobilised. Jersey men served in the British and French armed forces. Numbers of German prisoners of war were interned in Jersey. The influenza epidemic of 1918 added to the toll of war.

In 1919, imperial measurements replaced, for the most part, the traditional Jersey system of weights and measures; women aged over 30 were given the vote; and the endowments of the ancient grammar schools were repurposed as scholarships for Victoria College.

In 1921, the visit of King George V was the occasion for the design of the parish crests.

In 1923, the British government asked Jersey to contribute an annual sum towards the costs of the Empire. The States of Jersey refused and offered instead a one-off contribution to war costs. After negotiations, Jersey's one-off contribution was accepted.

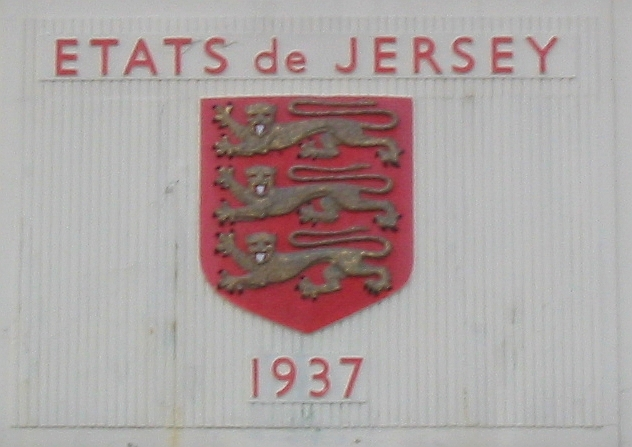
With the growth of air travel globally, Jersey Airport was opened in 1937. The original terminal still stands today.

The first motor car had arrived in 1899 and buses started running on the island in the 1920s, and by the 1930s, competition from motor buses had rendered the railways unprofitable, with final closure coming in 1935 after a fire disaster (except for the later German reintroduction of rail during the military occupation). Jersey Airport was opened in 1937 to replace the use of the beach of Saint Aubin's bay as an airstrip at low tide, and the railways could not cope with the competition.

English was first permitted in debates in the States of Jersey in 1901, and the first legislation to be drawn up primarily in English was the Income Tax Law of 1928.

=== Occupation 1940–1945 ===
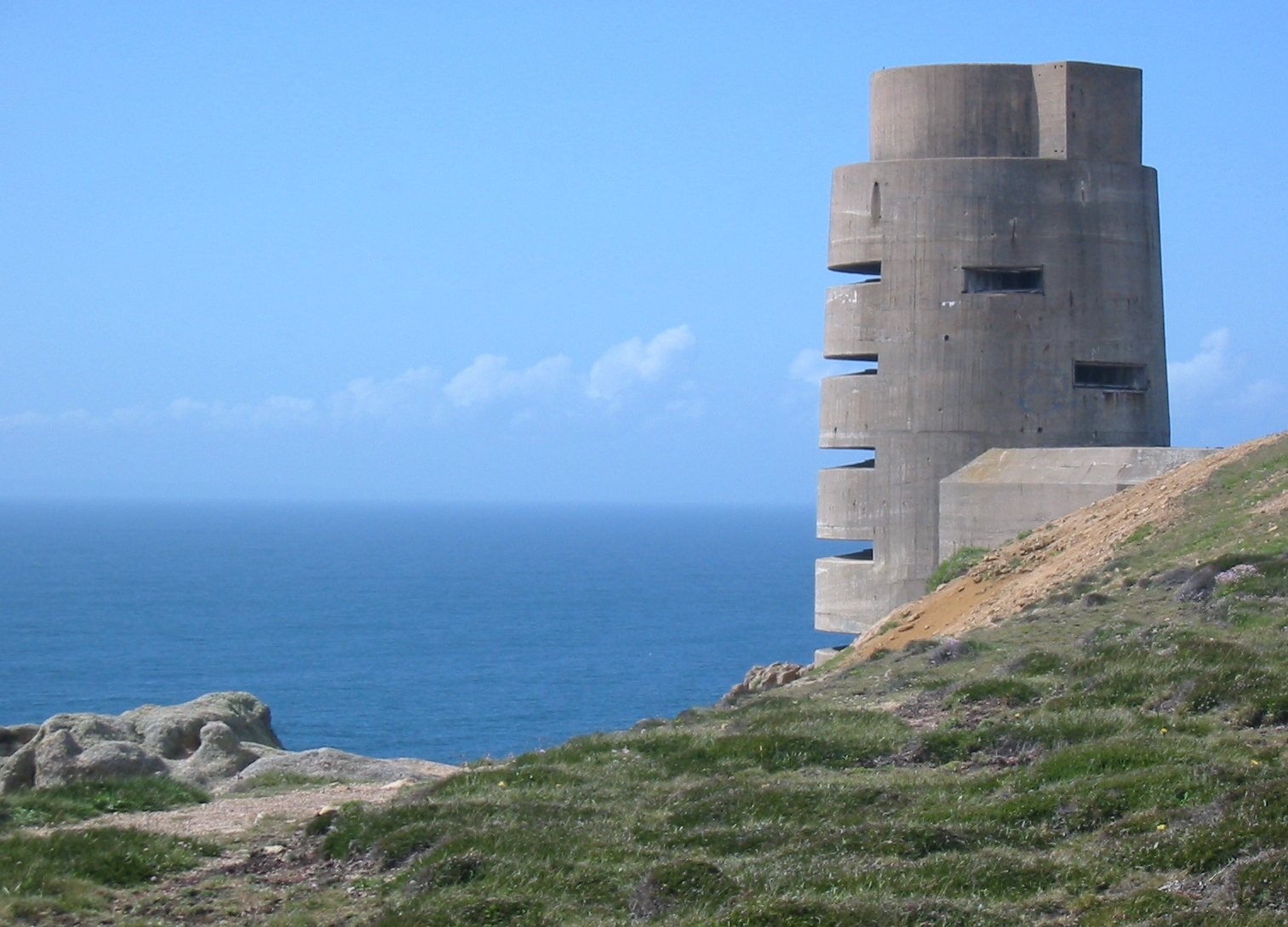
As part of the Atlantic Wall, between 1940 and 1945, the occupying German forces and the Organisation Todt constructed fortifications round the coast of Jersey such as this observation tower at Battery Moltke.

Following the withdrawal of defences by the British government and German bombardment, Jersey was occupied by German troops between 1940 and 1945. The Channel Islands were the only British soil occupied by German troops in World War II. This period of occupation had about 8,000 islanders evacuated, 1,200 islanders deported to camps in Germany, and over 300 islanders sentenced to the prison and concentration camps of mainland Europe. Twenty died as a result. The islanders endured near-starvation in the winter of 1944–45, after the Channel Islands had been cut off from German-occupied Europe by Allied forces advancing from the Normandy beachheads, avoided only by the arrival of the Red Cross supply ship Vega in December 1944. Liberation Day – 9 May is marked as a public holiday.

=== Post-Liberation ===
After five years of occupation, the people of Jersey began to rebuild the island. In 1944, a group of exiled islanders, called Nos Iles, set out what the Channel Islands would need after the war. Examples include better education, development of the economy, especially tourism, and greater cooperation between the islands. They also emphasised the need for efficient land management.

We have a limited amount of space and much to fit into it.

— Nos Iles, https://doi.org/10.1093/ia/20.4.574

Some Jersey men were enlisted in national service in occupied Germany. The UK donated more than £4 million to clear Jersey's occupation debt, as well as sending gifts of essential items. There were over 50,000 mines to be cleared. Sir Edward Grasett was sworn in as Lieutenant Governor in August 1945.

The 1945 census showed that 44,382 people were resident in the island (an increase of 4000 since Liberation). By the next year, there were 50,749, and the majority lived in St Helier. Many returned to their pre-war homes to find them in a state of dereliction and were given grants to repair the damage.

Many islanders called for the reform and modernisation of the States: a poll by the JEP showed that only 88 of the 1,784 surveyed thought Rectors should stay in the States and a vast majority wanted the legislature and judiciary separated. The Jersey Democratic Movement campaigned for either the incorporation of the island as a county of England or at least the abolition of the States. The other political party to emerge during this period was the Progressive Party, consisting of some present States members, who opposed the JDM. In the 1945 Deputies' election, the Progressives won a landslide victory, giving a mandate for change.

The franchise was extended to all British adults, previously voting rights in Jersey had only been to men and women over 30 according to property ownership. The largest reform came in the form of the 1948 States reform. Jurats were no longer States members and were to be elected by an Electoral College. It also introduced a retirement age for Jurats of 70. In all cases, the Bailiff shall be the judge of the law, and the Jurats the "judge of fact". The Jurats' role in the States was replaced by 12 senators, four of whom would retire every three years. The Church also lost most of its representation in the States, with the role of Rector being abolished and the number of Deputies increased to 28.

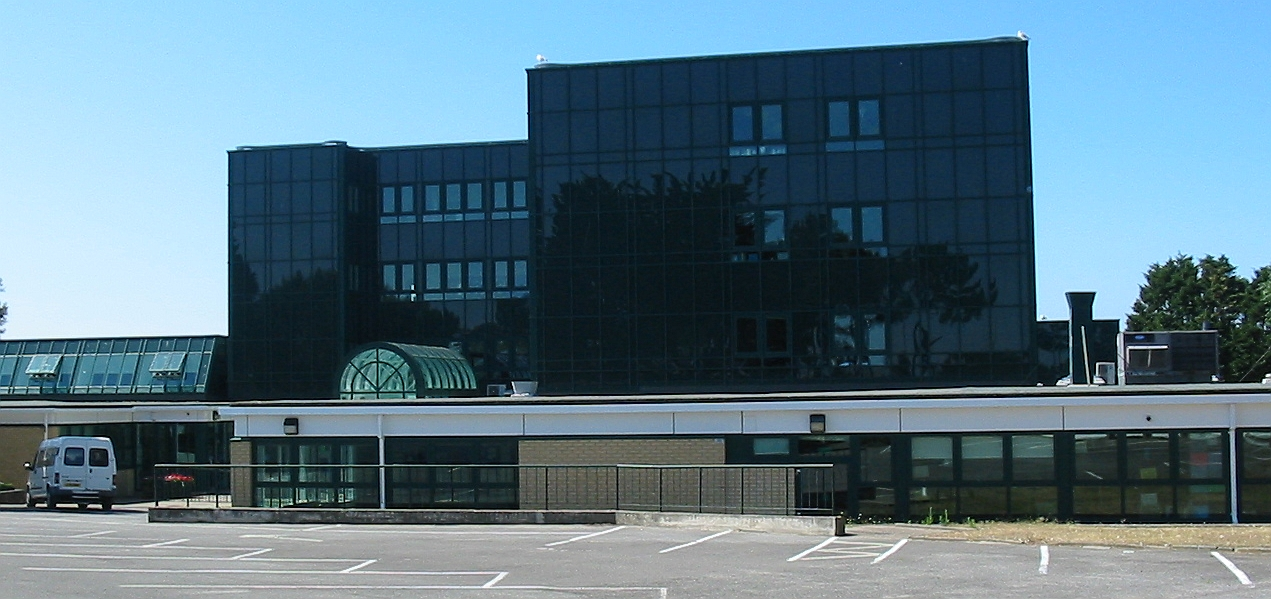
Les Quennevais school

The island adopted free, universal secondary education and a social security system. The bill for the social security system was passed in May 1950. A paid police force to cover the whole island was established to work alongside the honorary police. Divorce was legalised in 1949. In 1952, a state secondary school for boys was opened at Hautlieu and a girls' secondary was opened at Rouge Bouillon. Ten years later these would combine to form a single co-ed grammar school at Hautlieu, and two other schools: one for boys (d'Hautrée) and another for girls (at the Rouge Bouillon site) were opened. Later the two St Helier schools were combined into one comprehensive school and two other comprehensives were opened at Les Quennevais and Le Rocquier. Highlands College was purchased by the States in 1973 to provide further education.^{:280}

There was an expansion of housing to deal with growing population and to improve the quality of existing housing. There was also a slum clearance programme involving States-funded homes (either for social housing or sale) and States-funded mortgages. By 1948, since the end of the war, two estates had been built: Grasett Park and Princess Place. A sum of £52,000 was agreed to build more houses on land already owned by the States.

The population saw growth from wealthy immigrants looking for lower taxes and seasonal essential workers from the Continent and mainland. Jersey was particularly attractive to retired civil servants in former British colonies as these obtained independence throughout the 20th century. This created a need for new infrastructure. Street lighting began to spread to the country parishes and a new sewage farm was built at Bellozane. Mains drainage was extended beyond St Helier and new water production facilities were constructed.^{:281} The island saw a growth in tourism and the reopening of the Battle of Flowers parade (for the first time since World War I) as well as new cinemas and the International Road Race.

The military establishments of the island were handed over by the British Government to the Island and Jersey's Militia abolished. For the first time since Edward III, there was no permanent military presence on the island. The arsenals, forts are castles were converted to museums and housing (or in the case of Fort Regent, into the main leisure centre for town). There was a dispute over the ownership of Jersey's islets – the Minquiers and the Ecréhous – between the UK and France. The International Court of Justice ruled in favour of British ownership of the reefs.

Between 1945 and the Queen's coronation in 1952, there were outbreaks of polio and tuberculosis and the opening of the Jersey Maternity hospital and St John Ambulance headquarters. Agriculture was hit by a series of foot-and-mouth outbreaks.

The first senatorial election was brief. Each Senator was elected for either nine, six or three years depending on where they came in the polling list. Philip Le Feuvre topped the poll and was elected for nine years. On 8 December 1945 at the Deputies' election, Ivy Forster of the Progressive Party became the first woman to ever be elected to the States. Other notable successful candidates include John Le Marquand Jr. (whose father has recently been returned as Senator) and Cyril Le Marquand.

The event which has had the most far-reaching effect on Jersey in modern times is the growth of the finance industry in the island from the 1960s onwards,^{:287} which has led to debate that Jersey constitutes a tax haven.

== 21st century ==
Jersey's role as a finance centre has occasionally brought the island global media attention. For example in 2017, the Paradise Papers – a global leak of confidential documents relating to offshore investments – revealed that Apple had made two international subsidiaries tax resident in Jersey in 2015.

In 2008, a police investigation at Haut de la Garenne children's home found a record of abuse at the home dating back since liberation. More than 500 alleged offences were recorded and eight people were prosecuted.

As of 2024 Jersey Heritage is inviting locals to nominate sites of natural and cultural significance for potential UNESCO Global Geopark status, highlighting geological features like Anne Port and Portelet Bay alongside historical landmarks such as Le Dolmen des Geonnais and St Clement's Church, to showcase Jersey's unique heritage and join the network of 213 Global Geoparks worldwide.

== See also ==
- History of the British Isles
- Duchy of Normandy

=== Other Histories of the Channel Islands ===
- German occupation of the Channel Islands
- Archaeology of the Channel Islands
- Maritime history of the Channel Islands
- List of English monarchs
- List of British monarchs

=== Related articles for Jersey ===
- Lieutenant Governor of Jersey
- Culture of Jersey
- Politics of Jersey
- Demographics of Jersey (contains historical figures)
