= Chemin de fer touristique du Cotentin =

French heritage railway and voluntary association

Coordinates: 49°21′43.61″N 1°43′57.90″W

The Chemin de fer touristique du Cotentin is a 1,435 mm (4 ft 8 1/2 in) standard gauge heritage railway and voluntary association in Normandy, France. The railway runs between Barneville-Carteret and Portbail on part of the former railway line linking Carentan to Barneville-Carteret in Cotentin.

The railway began as the Association Tourisme et Chemins de fer de la Manche in 1982. The association has a set itself the task of preserving railway heritage in the Cotentin.

The association was founded in 1982 as the Association pour la Sauvegarde du Chemin de fer Carentan-Carteret, (ASCCC), which became in 1983, the Association pour la Sauvegarde du Chemin de fer Carentan-Carteret et Coutances - Cherbourg under pressure of the Cherbourg and Coutances councils.

On 14 July 1984, after pressure from several municipalities and inhabitants of the Manche département, the association increased its interest to the preservation of all local railways in the Manche and became Association pour les Transports en Commun de la Manche (ATCM). In July, as a promoter of tourism in the region, it changed once more its name to Association Tourisme et Chemins de fer de la Manche.

From 21 December 1988 to 30 June 1994, the Train touristique du Cotentin ran trains on a 10 km (6.2 mi) section of track from Carentan to Baupte with a 1950s railcar, then the X3825, the X2426.

From 23 June 1990, the TTC also runs trains between Barneville-Carteret and Portbail on a 9 km (5.6 mi) long section of track. Its main hauling power being a set of three 1930S passenger coaches and the BB63069. The X2426 sold to PontAuRail in 1995 and the X3825 to Quercyrail in 1998.

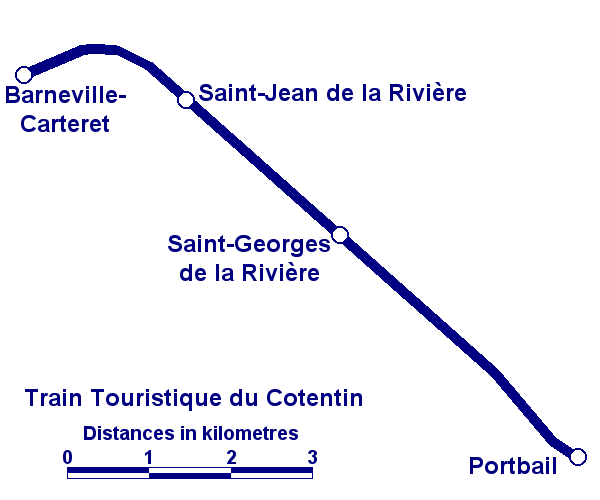
Map of the line's route.

== Stations ==
- Portbail
- Saint-Georges-de-la-Rivière
- Saint-Jean-de-la-Rivière
- Barneville
- Carteret
