= St Helier railway station (Jersey Eastern Railway) =

Former railway station in Saint Helier, Jersey

St Helier (Snow Hill) Saint Hélyi
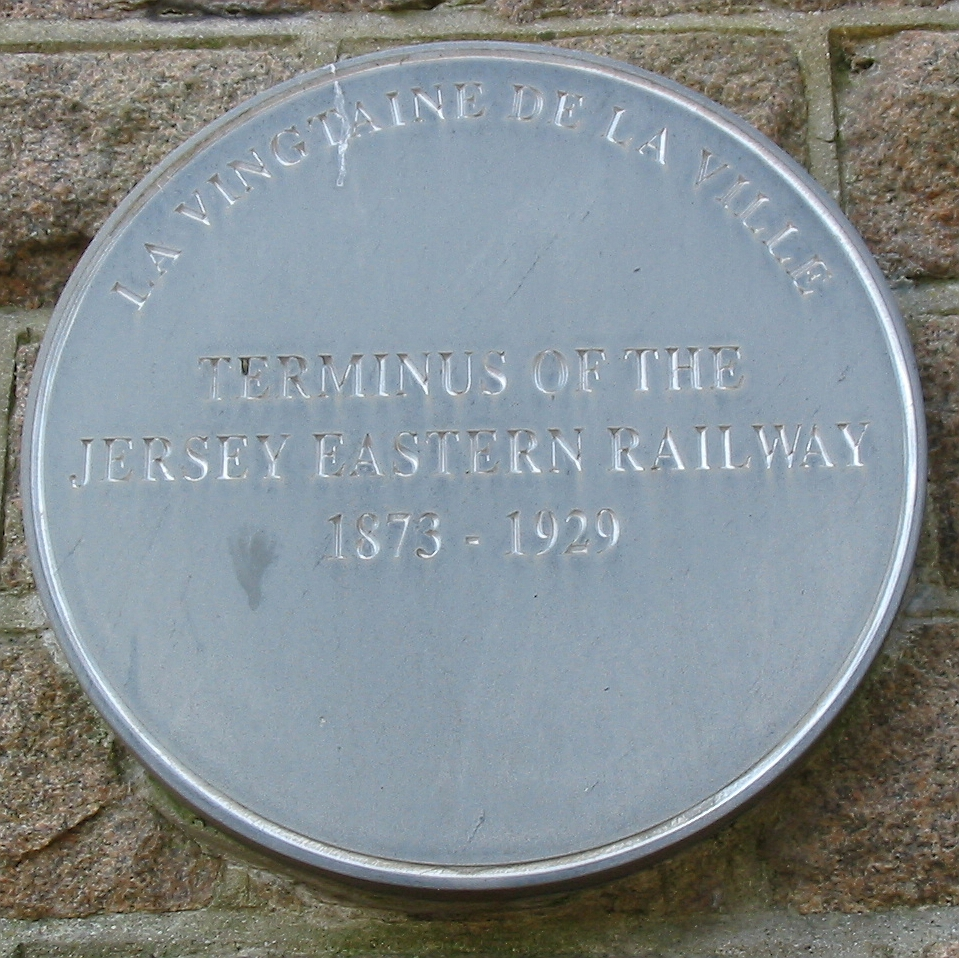
- Plaque marking the site of the former Jersey Eastern Railway terminus

General information
- Location: Hill Street, Saint Helier; Jersey, Channel Islands
- Coordinates: 49.182975°N 2.103549°W
- Owner: Jersey Railway
- Line: Eastern line to Gorey Harbour

Other information
- Status: closed

History
- Opened: 6 May 1874
- Closed: 21 June 1929
Route map
Location
- Location within Jersey

St Helier railway station was the terminus of the Jersey Eastern Railway in Saint Helier, the capital of Jersey, in the Channel Islands. Opened in 1874, it was situated in a railway cutting at the base of Mont de la Ville, below Fort Regent. The station was referred to as St. Helier (Snow Hill) to distinguish it from the town's other railway terminus, which was opened by the Jersey Railway in 1873 at the Weighbridge (now Liberation Square). The station was in passenger operation until the line closed in 1929.

== History ==
The Jersey Eastern Railway Company (JER) was constructed in response to demand by the inhabitants of the harbour town of Gorey, following the opening of the Jersey Railway line in the west of the island. The States of Jersey passed an Act authorising the construction of an eastern railway line from Snow Hill to Gorey, and on to St Catherine on 31 March 1871; Royal Assent was received in 1872.

On 6 April 1873, the Jersey Eastern Railway Company was registered. It had permission to construct a railway from Snow Hill to Gorey, and on to St Catherine's. The line took several years to build and the final section to St Catherine's was never completed, with the terminus at Gorey Pier opening in 1891.

The site for the JER's St Helier terminus was difficult to find, as there was no route around Mont de la Ville into the town centre. It was decided to excavate a 600-foot (180 m)-long, 70-foot (21 m)-deep cutting through the rocky outcrop under Fort Regent and Regent Road to provide a terminal station on Hill Street. The excavation works overran and, when the Eastern line opened in August 1873, it ran only as far as a temporary terminus adjacent to the JER's locomotive depot at Green Street. Snow Hill station eventually opened on 6 May 1874.

The station approach was a short cobbled crescent running from Hill Street leading to a station building at the north end of the station, which contained the booking office, waiting rooms and station offices. There was one 300-foot (91 m)-long platform which could accommodate one long or two short trains, a carriage siding and a turnaround loop.

The station was covered by a canopy. The line out of the station was single-track, with a short section of double track passing under East Road bridge to the Green Street level crossing.

Initially, the line was a success, with 28 trains running between Snow Hill and Gorey each day. In 1881, a steam ferry service commenced operation from Gorey to Carteret in Normandy, France, and the JER offered through tickets from Saint Helier to Paris Saint-Lazare, via the newly opened Carteret to Carentan Railway.

== Closure ==
After years of successful operation, the JER ran into financial difficulties after World War I and fierce competition from bus services run by the Jersey Bus Company drove the company's profits down. In 1929, after a failed merger proposal with the Jersey Railway, the JER went into liquidation and the railway line was closed.

Snow Hill station was demolished and the land below Fort Regent was converted into a bus station by the States of Jersey in 1932. The site was particularly narrow and the bus station was equipped with the unusual feature of a bus turntable to allow buses to turn around more easily. The bus station closed in 1964 when a new bus station opened at Weighbridge, adjacent to St Helier's other disused railway station.

== Cable car ==
In the 1970s, Fort Regent was developed as a tourist attraction. An aerial cable car was opened in April 1970 to transport visitors to the summit. The ground-level station was built on the former Snow Hill station site, at the north end of the car park. The cable car continued in operation until it closed in the late 1980s and the Snow Hill station was demolished. The high-level cable car station was finally demolished in 2018.

== The site today ==
The site is now occupied by a car park; all that remains of the railway station is a stone wall facing hill street. A blue plaque has been fixed to this wall commemorating the station. The Jersey Eastern Railway Terminus Hotel, known as The Eastern Hotel, is still standing on the corner of Hill Street and Snow Hill; it is now a listed building.
