= SNCF Class X 2400 =

French diesel railcars

SNCF X 2400
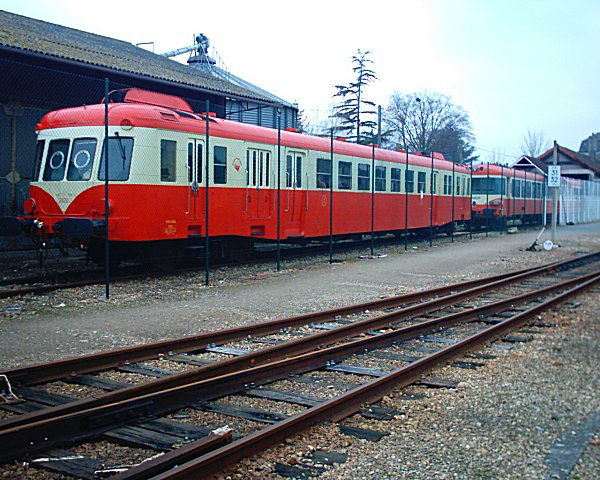
- The X 2426 at Pont-Audemer
- In service: 1951 to 1989
- Manufacturer: Régie Renault/Decauville
- Constructed: 1951 to 1955
- Number built: 79
- Number in service: 0
- Number preserved: 11
- Formation: Single car
- Fleet numbers: X 2401 to X 2479
- Capacity: 12 first class; 56 second class
- Operator: SNCF/TER

Specifications
- Car length: 27.73 m (91 ft 0 in)
- Maximum speed: 120 km/h (75 mph)
- Weight: 43 tonnes (42 long tons; 47 short tons) in working order
- Prime movers: Renault 517, 2 off
- Engine type: Diesel
- Power output: 456 kW (612 hp)
- Transmission: Mechanical
- Track gauge: 1,435 mm (4 ft 8 1/2 in)

SNCF's X 2400 are a French class of railcars. The 79 XABDP 2400, unifiés 600 PS (440 kW) were built from 1951 to 1955. They were capable of carrying 12 passengers in 1st class and 56 in 2nd class, they were 27 m (88 ft 7 in) long and capable of reaching a top speed of 120 km/h (75 mph). The railcars were often coupled to trailers of coupled to other units.

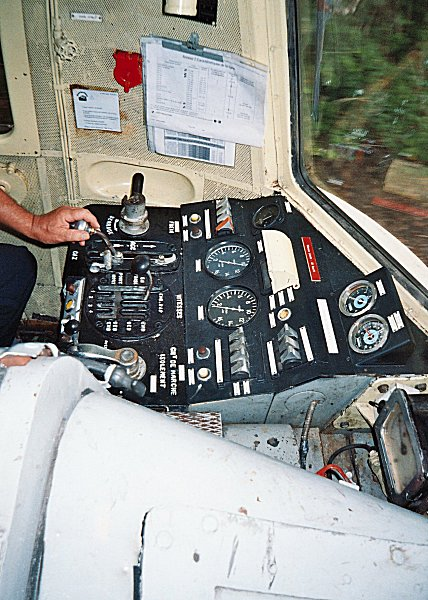
Driving cabin of the X 2426.

The class was put into service along the X 3800, Picasso. These 300 PS (220 kW) railcars facilitated the phasing out of steam traction and to renew aging railcar stock. The class was first allocated to Limoges and onto the lines of the Massif Central, coupled to XR 8000 trailers. The X 2400 was quickly accompanied by the X 2800 railcars, equipped with one engine only, but more powerful.

The maintenance cost of the X 2400 was greater than the one-engined X 2800 and so the class was moved to Rennes. The arrival of the X 2100 and X 2200 railcars precipitated the retirement of the X 2400, the last 2400 retiring in 1989.

The X 2464 was withdrawn from service in 1988 and was modified into a measurement train. It was painted into the Corail livery of dark grey, orange and white. Twelve railcars have been preserved.

Two sub-classes of X 2400 exist:

- XABDP 2401 to 2469 with a weight of 43 t (42 long tons; 47 short tons), two 517G Renault engines with 250 kW (340 PS) (340 ch) output.
- XABDP 2470 to 2479 with a weight of 44.5 t (43.8 long tons; 49.1 short tons), two Saurer engines with 235 kW (320 PS) (320 ch) output.

== Preserved Units ==
=== Operating ===
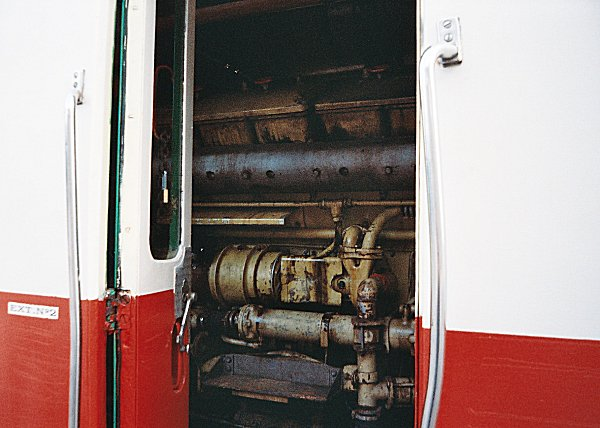
Motor of the X 2426.

- X 2403: Gentiane express. Classified as a Monument Historique.
- X 2419: Train Touristique de la Vallée du Loir (TTVL) at Thoré-la-Rochette. Classified as a Monument Historique.
- X 2423: Chemin de fer du Centre-Bretagne
- X 2425: Chemin de fer du Haut Forez (CFHF)
- X 2426: Chemin de fer touristique Pontarlier-Vallorbe

=== Non-operable ===
- X 2464: Reformed in 2010, parked at Le Mans.

=== Scrapped ===
- X 2402 : Parked at Saint-Dié. Scrapped in 2004.
- X 2431 : Train à Petite Vitesse des Morins. Scrapped in 1998.
- X 2448 : Private property, parked at Oignies. Scrapped in February 2009.
- X 2468 : Chemin de Fer Touristique du Sud des Ardennes, sold back to SNCF in 2007 for spare parts. Scrapped in 2014.
