= Pont-Audemer station =

Railway station in Pont-Audemer, France

Coordinates: 49°21′5″N 0°30′57″E

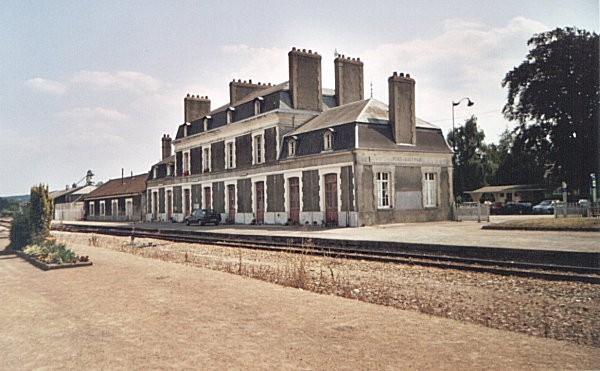

Gare de Pont-Audemer is a former railway station in the market town of Pont-Audemer, Eure in Upper Normandy. The station is on the railway line from Paris-Saint-Lazare to Honfleur via Brionne.

The CF de l'Ouest company built the line from Glos-Montfort and opened it on 23 August 1867, with an extension to Honfleur opened 8 August 1889. The line closed in 1977 but the station remained open as a ticket office as well as a headquarters for PontAuRail from 1995 to the end of the association in September 2006.
