= Corbière railway station =

Former railway station in Jersey, Channel Islands

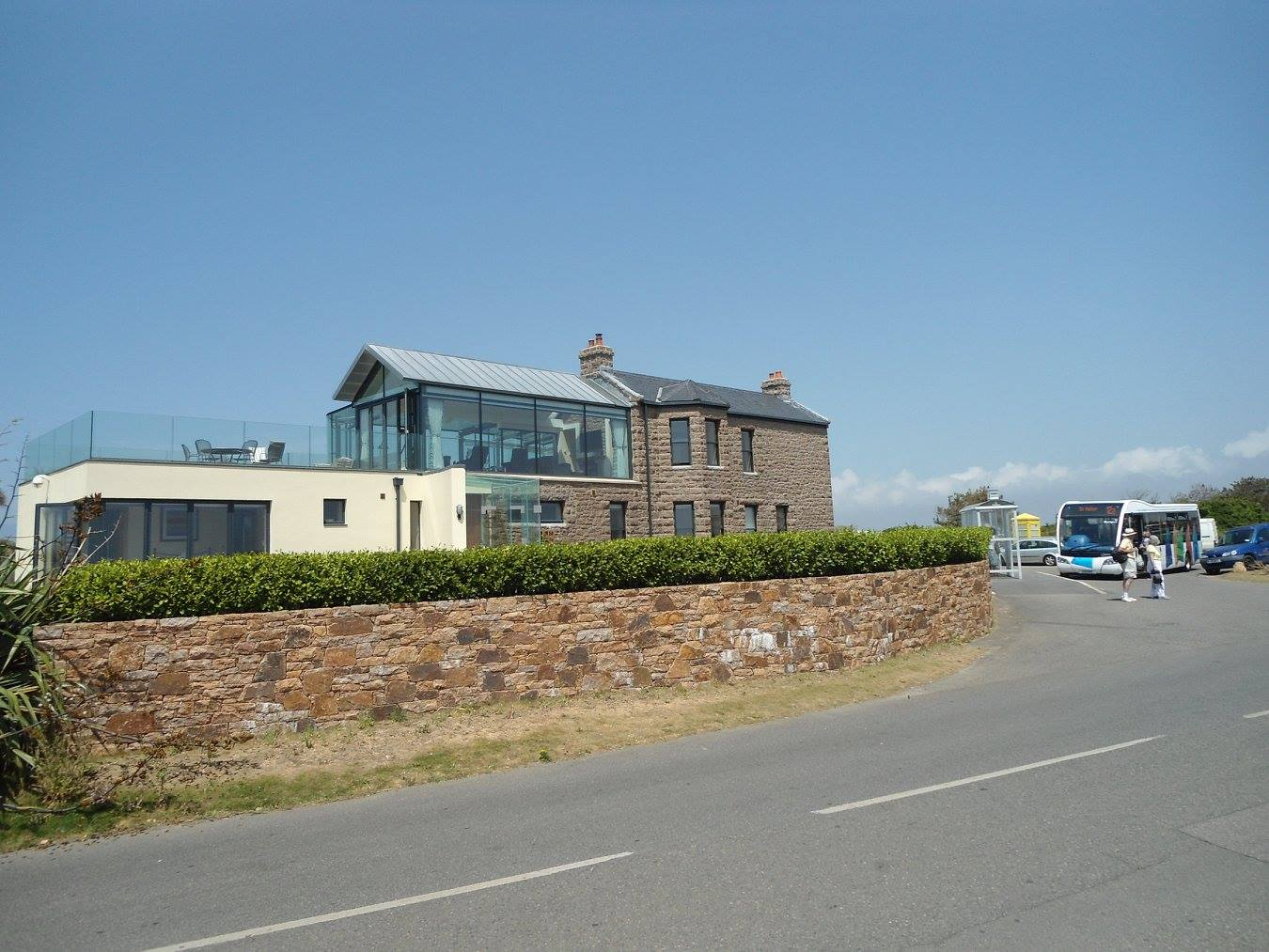
- The former Corbière station building

General information
- Location: Rue de la Corbière; Saint Brélade, Jersey, Channel Islands
- Coordinates: 49°10′54″N 2°14′18″W
- Owner: Jersey Railway
- Operator: Jersey Railway
- Lines: Western line to St Aubin and St Helier

Other information
- Status: Closed

History
- Opened: 1 July 1899
- Closed: 30 September 1936
Route map
Location
- Location within Jersey

Corbière railway station served the area of La Corbière, at the extreme south-western point of Jersey, in the Channel Islands, between 1899 and 1936. Located in the parish of Saint Brélade, it was the western terminus of the Jersey Railway which ran along the south coast to the capital town of the island, Saint Helier.

== History ==
The station had a relatively short life, opening on 1 July 1899 and closing 30 September 1936, although the track was briefly relaid and the line reopened for freight during the German occupation of the Channel Islands.

== The site today ==
The station building, platform and track bed are still extant, with the building having a large glass extension added in 2008. The 12A bus route, which serves the same towns and villages as the former railway line, ends outside the front of the station building.
