= Mannez Quarry railway station =

Railway station in Alderney, Guernsey

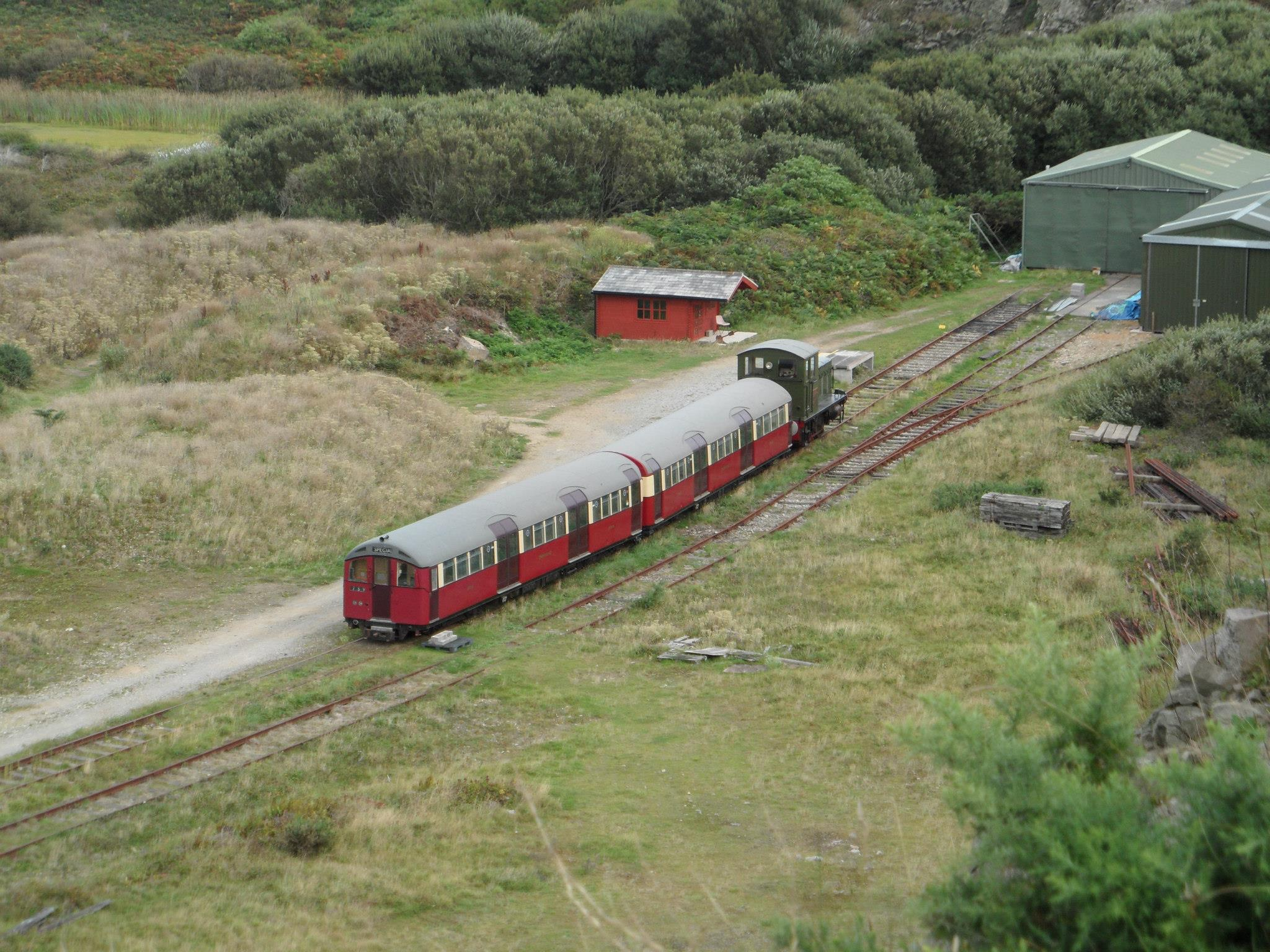

General information
- Location: Mannez Quarry, St Anne, Guernsey, GY9; Bailiwick of Guernsey
- Coordinates: 49.727°N 2.167°W
- Operator: Alderney Railway Society
- Platforms: 1

Other information
- Station code: MQ
Location

Mannez Quarry is a station on the Alderney Railway, located on the island of Alderney. The station has one platform and multiple sidings, and it serves as the home of all the locomotives and rolling stock. Mannez Quarry marks the terminus of the Alderney Railway, situated two miles (3.2 km) from Braye Road.

== Depot ==
The railway's depot is located next to the station where all of the railway's rolling stock is stored, it was built in 1997.

In 2008 a larger second shed was built, alongside the original, to house the tube cars which enabled maintenance to be carried out under cover, it was extended slightly in 2010 to enable the loco and tube cars to be housed without the need to de-couple.

== Miniature railway ==
In addition to standard gauge railway, the Alderney Railway owns and operates a 71/4 inch miniature railway at Mannez Quarry. The miniature railway extends to around a quarter of a mile beyond the main railway station.

| Preceding station | Heritage railways | Following station |
|---|---|---|
| Braye Road Terminus | Alderney Railway | Terminus |
