= La Corbière =

Area in St. Brélade, Jersey

La Corbière La Corbiéthe
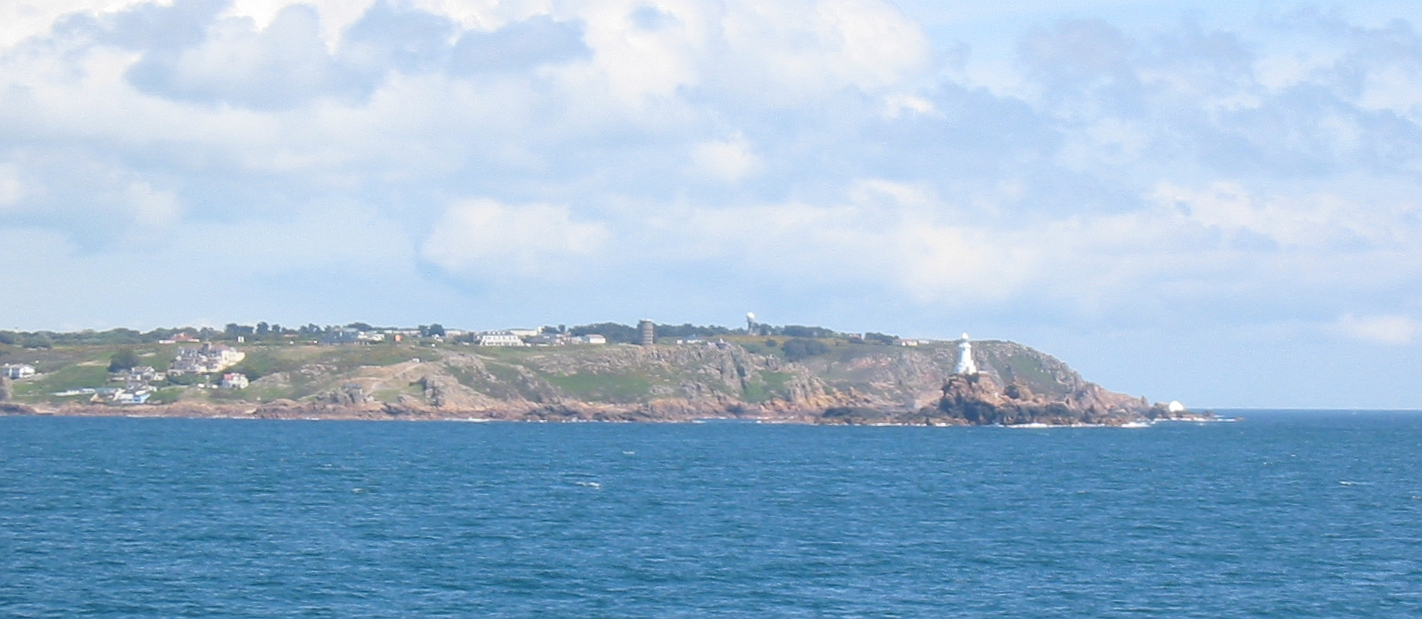
- La Corbière, from the west

- Flag

- Location within Jersey Location within Channel Islands
- Crown Dependency: Jersey, Channel Islands
- Time zone: GMT
  - Summer (DST): UTC+01
- Postcode district: JE3
- Postcode sector: 8
- Website: www.parish.gov.je/st_brelade/

La Corbière (French pronunciation: [la kɔʁbjɛʁ]; Jèrriais: La Corbiéthe) is an area within the parish of St. Brélade, on the extreme south-western point of Jersey, Channel Islands.

== Toponymy ==
The name means "a place where crows gather", deriving from the word corbîn meaning crow. However, seagulls have long since displaced the crows from their coastal nesting sites.

== History ==
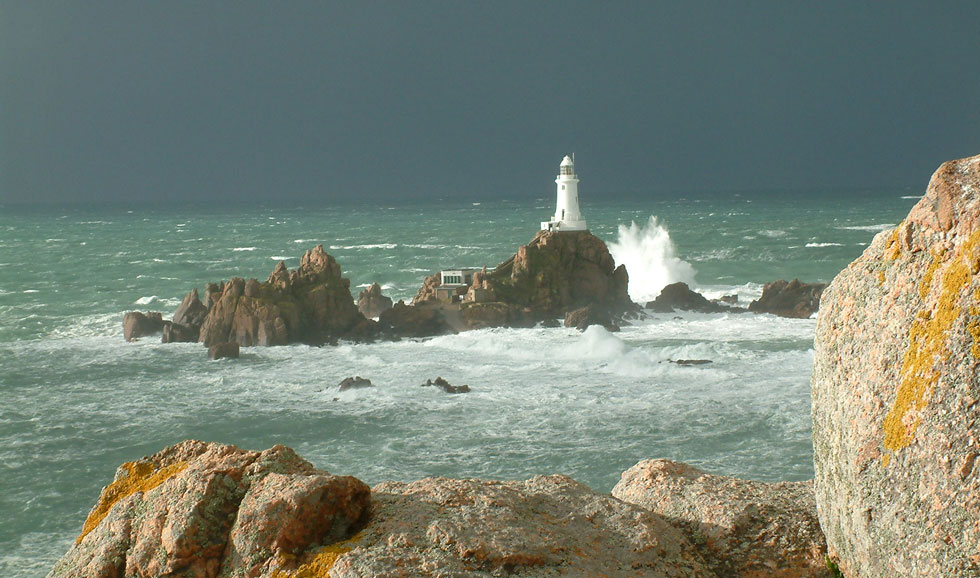
La Corbière Lighthouse, with a storm approaching

The rocks and extreme tidal variation around this stretch of Jersey's coast have been treacherous for navigation and La Corbière has been the scene of many shipwrecks, including that of the mail packet Express on 20 September 1859.

Just opposite the former railway platform, on the other side of the Railway Walk, is La Table des Marthes, a megalith. The table-like stone was used historically as a meeting place for the witnessing of contracts and it is conjectured that the name is a corruption of la table des martyres. (Note: "Martyr" being intended in its meaning of "witness".) Other theories have been put forward to explain the name and purpose of this stone.

== Lighthouse ==
La Corbière Lighthouse
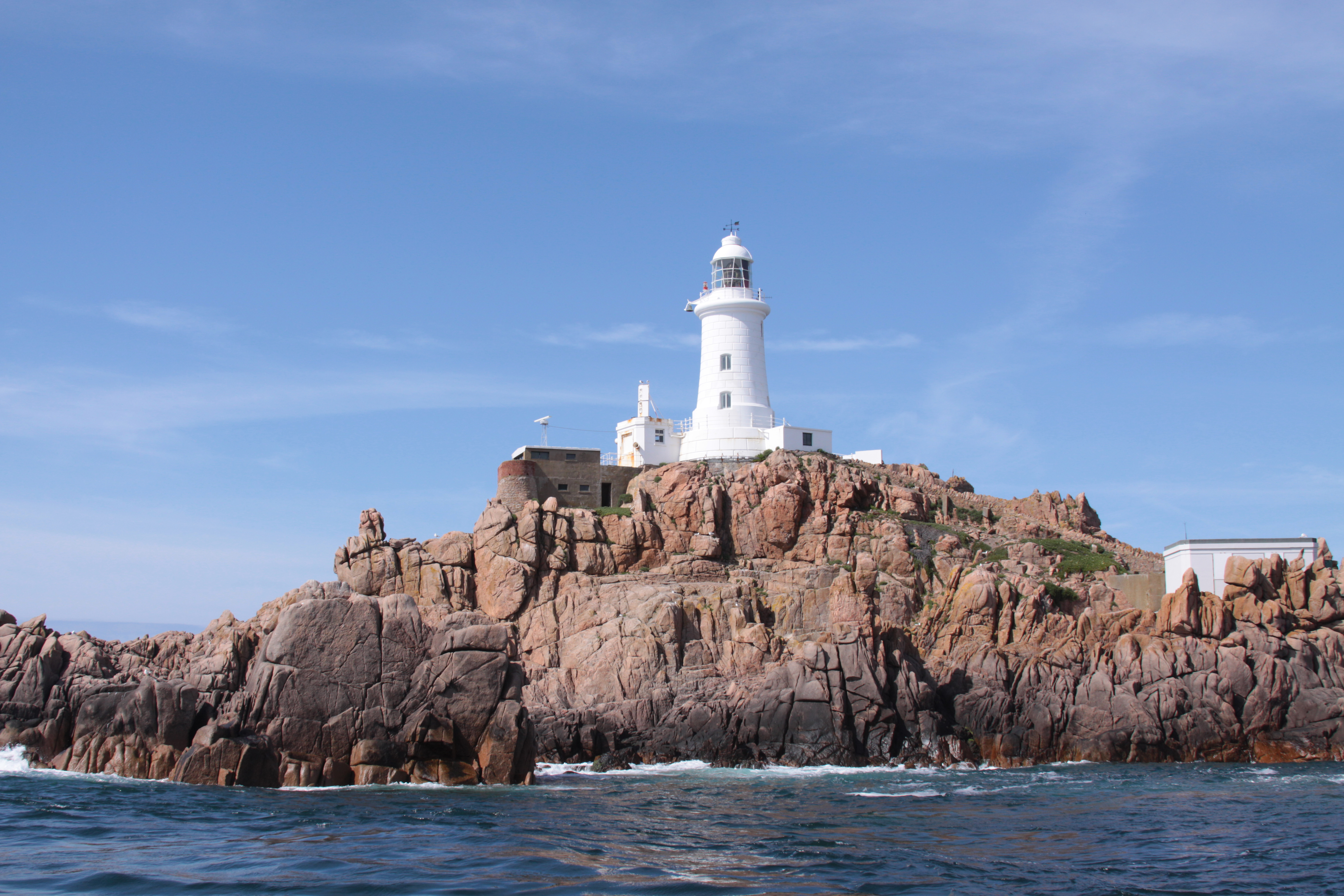
- Corbière Lighthouse
- Location: La Corbière, Jersey, Channel Islands
- Coordinates: 49.179902°N 2.250148°W

Tower
- Constructed: 1874
- Construction: Reinforced concrete tower
- Height: 19 m (62 ft)
- Shape: Cylindrical tower with balcony and lantern
- Markings: White tower and lantern
- Operator: Jersey Harbours
- Fog signal: Four blasts, long-short-long-short, every 60 seconds.

Light
- Focal height: 36 m (118 ft)
- Range: White light: 18 nautical miles (33 km; 21 mi); Red light: 16 nautical miles (30 km; 18 mi)
- Characteristic: Iso WR 5s.

The lighthouse is situated on a rock that is a tidal island; a causeway links the lighthouse to shore at low tide. There is an alarm to warn visitors to clear the causeway as the tide rises; still, there have been casualties among the unwary or unlucky. A plaque adjacent to the causeway commemorates Peter Edwin Larbalestier, assistant keeper of the lighthouse, who was drowned on 28 May 1946 while trying to rescue a visitor cut off by the incoming tide.

The lighthouse tower is 19 metres (62 ft) high and the lamp stands 36 metres (118 ft) above high water spring tides. It was first lit on 24 April 1874 and was the first lighthouse in the British Isles to be built of concrete. The lighthouse was built to designs by Sir John Coode. The beam has a reach of 18 nmi (33 km) and was automated in 1976.

The lighthouse at La Corbière is one of the most photographed landmarks in Jersey and is a popular tourist site for its panoramic views. In the evenings, the surrounding area provides an ideal viewing point for sunsets. It features on Jersey's five pound note and its twenty pence piece.

== Monument ==
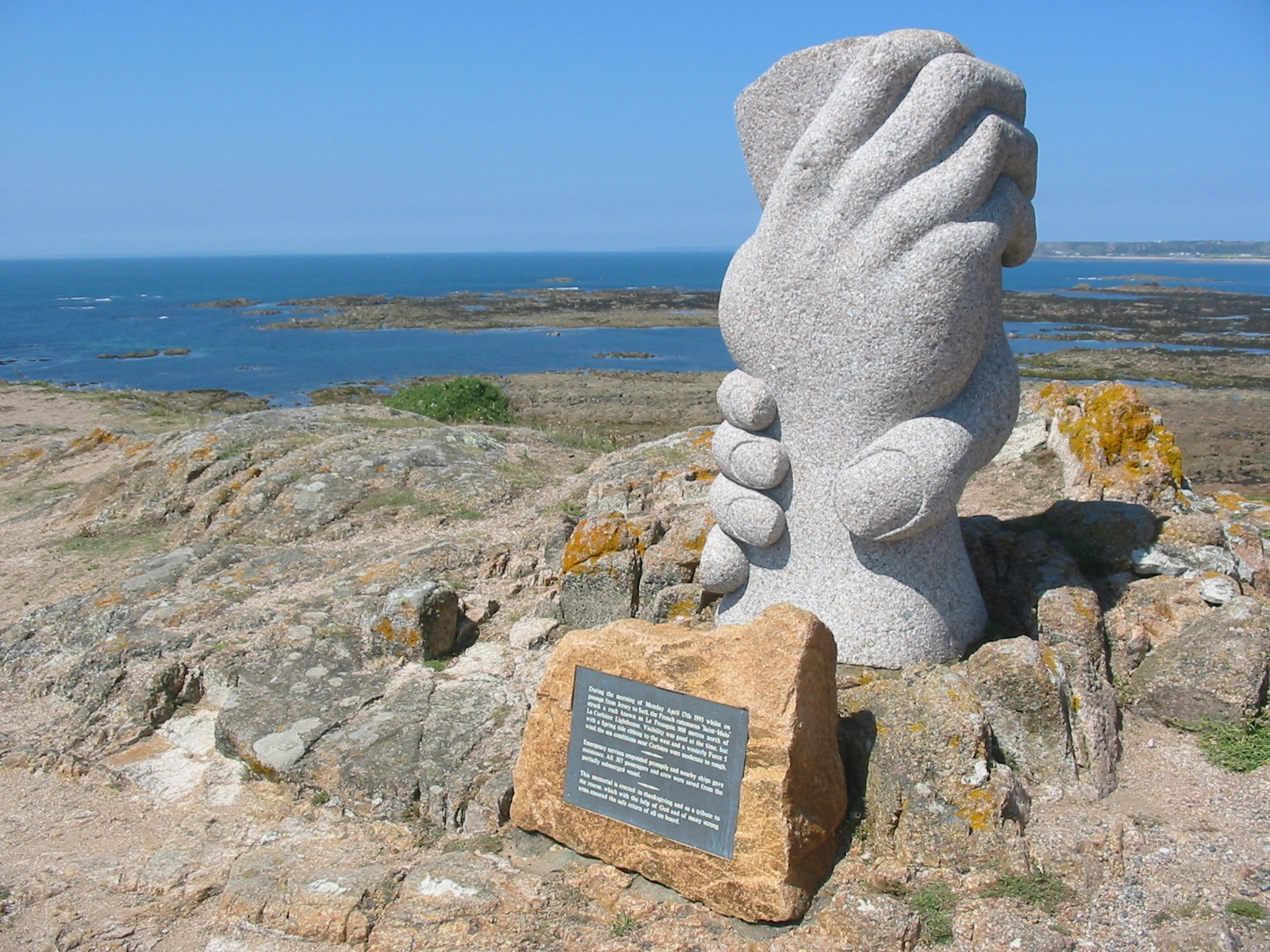
Saint-Malo sculpture commemorating a maritime rescue, 1995

Sited on the headland overlooking the lighthouse is a monument, which was sculpted by Derek Tristram and erected in April 1997, to commemorate a rescue that took place; the accompanying plaque describes the event:

"During the morning of Monday 17th April 1995 whilst on passage from Jersey to Sark, the French catamaran Saint-Malo struck a rock known as La Frouquie, 900 metres north of La Corbière Lighthouse. Visibility was good at the time but, with a spring tide ebbing to the west and a westerly Force 5 wind, the sea conditions near Corbière were moderate to rough."

"Emergency services responded promptly and nearby ships gave assistance. All 307 passengers and crew were saved from the partially submerged vessel."

"This memorial is erected in thanksgiving and as a tribute to the rescue, which with the help of God and of many strong arms, ensured the safe return of all on board."

== Radio tower ==
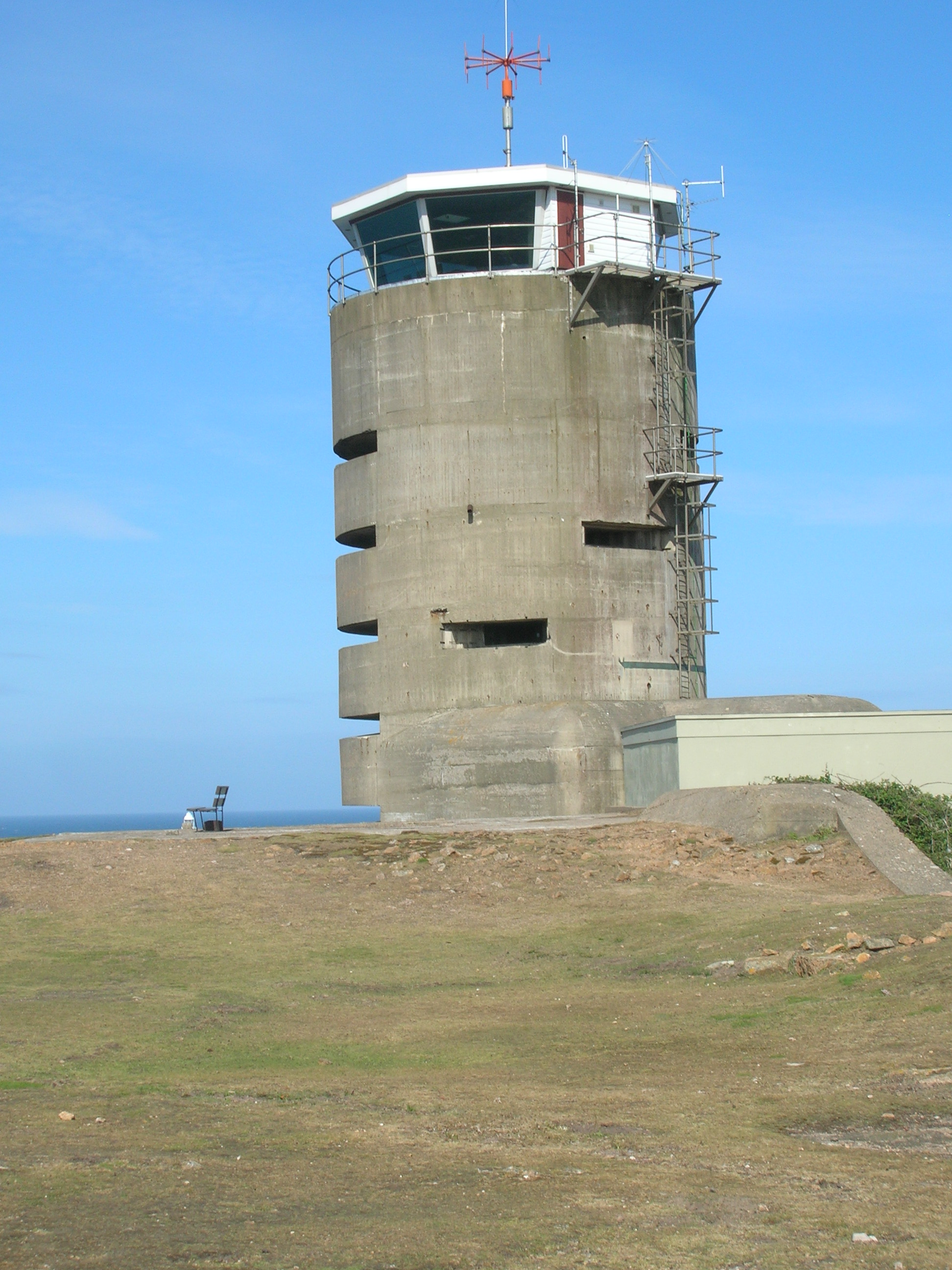
The MP2 radio tower

At the top of the headland is a range-finding MP2 radio tower that the German occupying forces built in 1941, during the Second World War; it was constructed of reinforced concrete. At that time, they camouflaged it with paint to give it an appearance similar to an 18th-century granite round tower.

The tower has seven floors, including the top floor which was originally a flat roof. The top floor is now enclosed with a new roof and glazing; it provides a 360° view out over Jersey's south-west tip.

In 1976, the States' Harbours and Ports Committee added a glassed-in control room where a duty officer could monitor the radio communications of vessels in the English Channel. In 2006, the tower transferred ownership to the Public of the Island of Jersey, under the management of Jersey Heritage.

== Transport ==
=== Buses ===
La Corbiere is served by three bus routes, operated by LibertyBus:

- 12A to St Helier, via St Aubin
- 22 and X22 to L'Etacq.

=== Railway ===
La Corbière was formerly the western terminus of the Jersey Railway line from Saint Helier. The first through train ran from St Helier to Corbière on 5 August 1885. The service was unable to compete against motor buses and the railway closed in 1935. The States of Jersey purchased the railway trackbed on 1 April 1937 and created a shared-use path now known as the Railway Walk, linking La Corbière and Saint Aubin for pedestrians and cyclists. The former station building and railway platform can still be seen at the end of the Railway Walk on Rue de la Corbière.

During the German military occupation in 1940-45 during the Second World War, the Nazis re-established light railways for the purpose of supplying coastal fortifications. A one-metre gauge line was laid down following the route of the former Jersey Railway from Saint Helier to La Corbière, with a branch line connecting the stone quarry at Ronez in Saint John. The German railway infrastructure was dismantled after the Liberation in 1945, but other German fortifications remain, besides the communications tower, and can be seen around the headland.

== Culture ==
The prominence of La Corbière, especially for travellers by sea for whom rounding the rocky waters around the headland often means the roughest part of the journey from Guernsey or England but also the consolation that the boat is entering the final straight towards the harbour of St. Helier, has led to several proverbial expressions in Jèrriais:

- "J'avons pâssé La Corbiéthe": We've passed La Corbière. Means "the worst is over"
- "Il a pâssé hardi dg'ieau l'tou d'La Corbiéthe": A lot of water has passed round La Corbière. Means "that's water under the bridge."

== Gallery ==
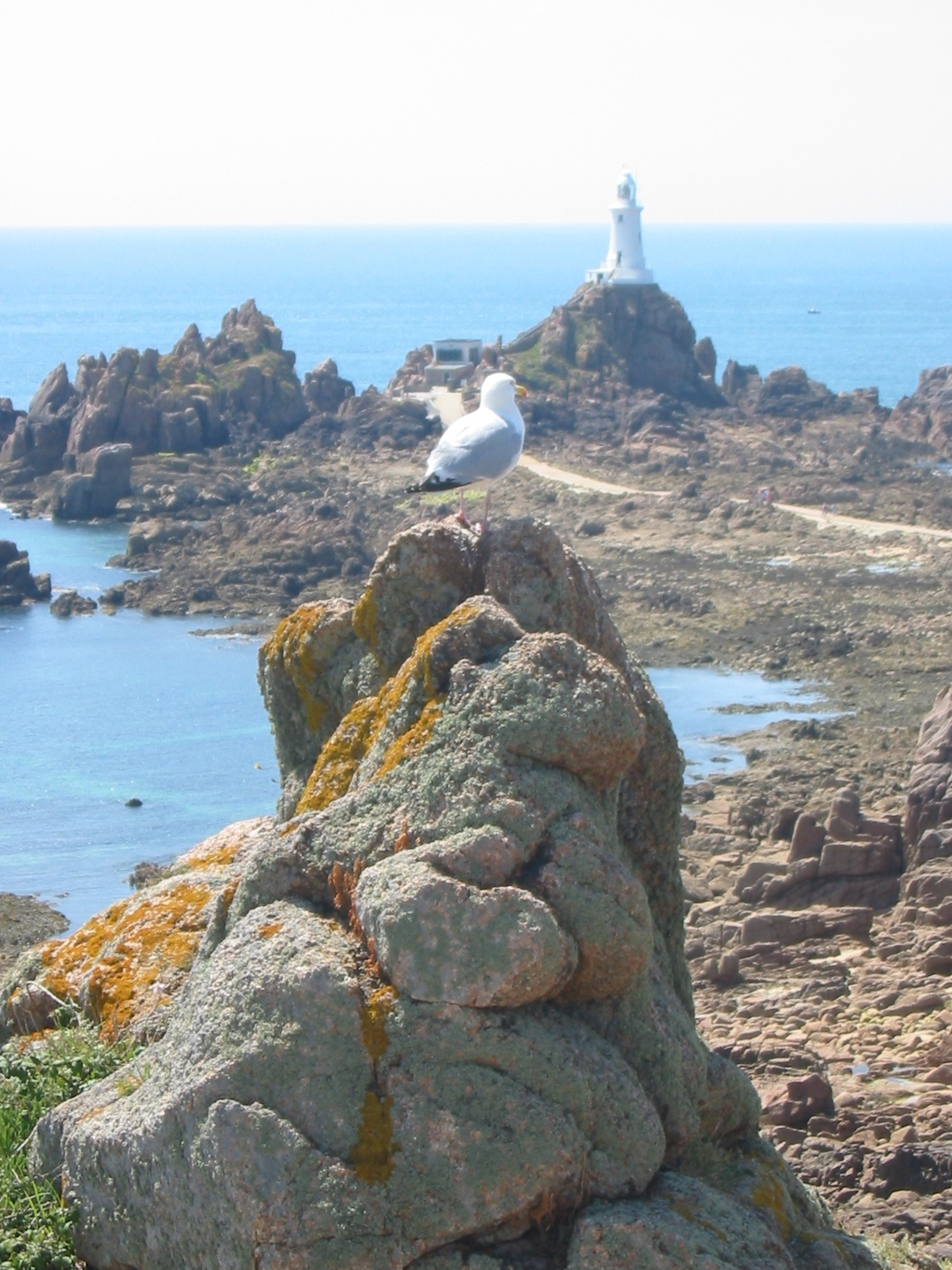
The causeway to the lighthouse is uncovered at low tide

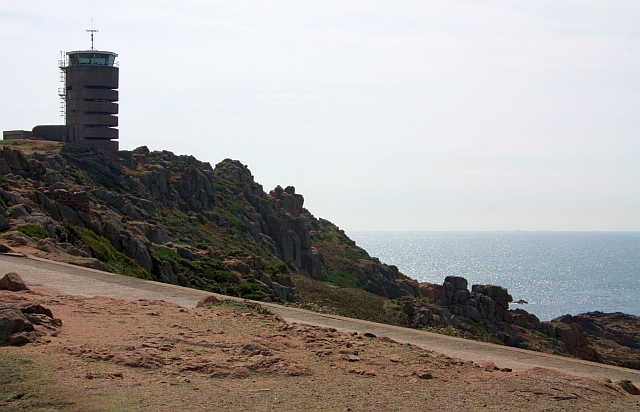
MP2 Observation tower, La Corbiere. Constructed during the Second World War by the German occupying forces

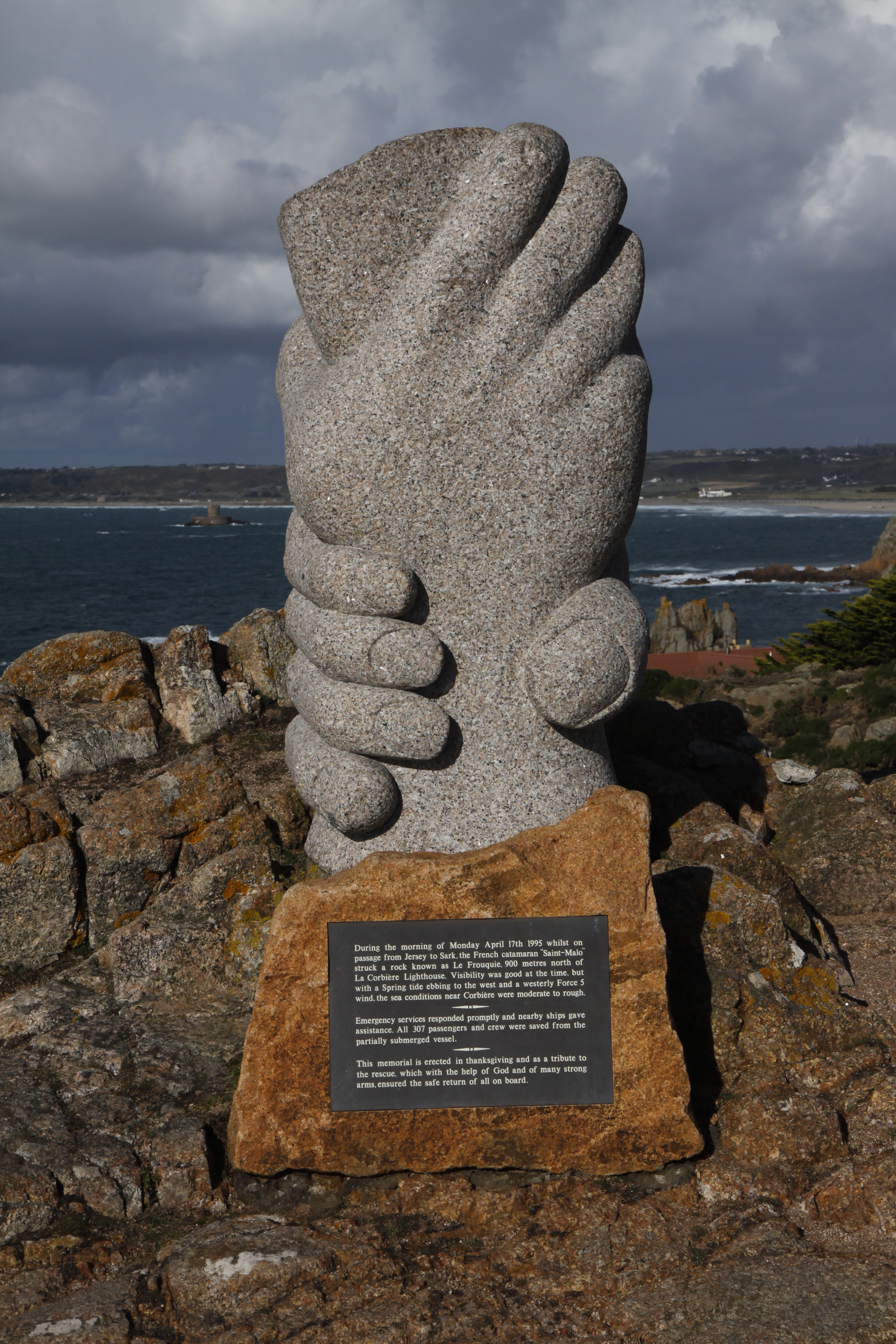
Saint Malo sculpture.

== See also ==
- List of lighthouses in the Channel Islands
