= Alderney Lighthouse =

Alderney
- Alderney Lighthouse
- Location: Alderney; English Channel
- Coordinates: 49.7292°N 2.1643°W

Tower
- Constructed: 1912
- Construction: granite tower
- Automated: 1997
- Height: 32 metres (105 ft)
- Shape: conical tower with balcony and lantern attached to keeper's house
- Markings: white tower with one broad black band
- Operator: Trinity House
- Fog signal: siren: 3 blasts every 20 seconds whistle: 2 blasts ever 15 seconds

Light
- Focal height: 37 metres (121 ft)
- Lens: 1st Order 920mm 4 panel Catadioptric (original), 2 X 4-tier LED Lantern (current)
- Intensity: 4,140 candela
- Range: 12 nautical miles (22 km; 14 mi)
- Characteristic: Fl W (4) 15s

The Alderney Lighthouse (also known as Mannez Lighthouse) is a stone lighthouse built on the North-East coast of the island of Alderney. It was constructed in 1912 to protect shipping from the dangerous waters of the Alderney Race and the numerous rocks surrounding Alderney.

== History ==
The Alderney Lighthouse was constructed from granite in 1912 under the guidance of local businessman William Baron. It was electrified in 1976, and automated in 1997, when the last resident lighthouse keeper left. The Trinity House Central Planning Unit in Essex controls and maintains the lighthouse.

Before its construction there were several notable wrecks off Alderney, including the Leros. It still functions as a lighthouse, but is open for guided tours during the summer months when it is linked with the rest of the island by the Alderney Railway.

In March 2011 the lighthouse was downgraded. The light reduced from 24hrs with a 23 nautical miles (43 km; 26 mi) range to dark hours only with a 12 nautical miles (22 km; 14 mi). This downgrade meant that the main beam was switched off, the lens shrouded and the light pulse now provided by a pair of LED lamps fixed to the sides of the tower. The fog signal was stopped at the same time.

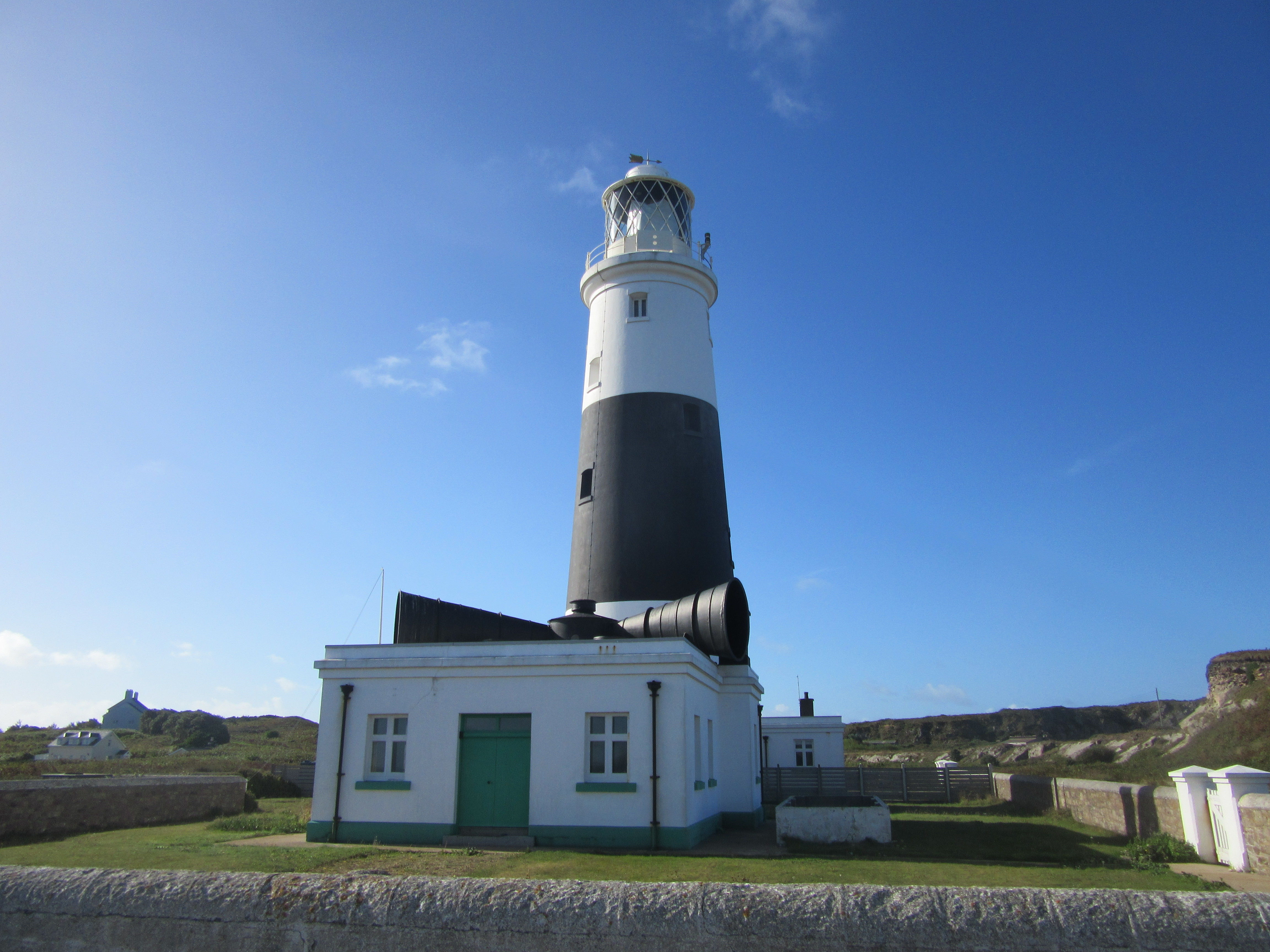
Alderney Mannez Lighthouse

== See also ==
- List of lighthouses in the Channel Islands
