= List of lighthouses in the Channel Islands =

Channel Islands

This is a list of lighthouses in the Channel Islands. The archipelago lies to the west of the Cotentin Peninsula in the English Channel. There are lighthouses on all of the four main islands: Alderney, Guernsey, Jersey and Sark.

== Lighthouses in the Bailiwick of Guernsey ==
Name	Image	Location & coordinates	Year built	Tower height (in metres)	Focal height ( in metres)	Admiralty number
Alderney Lighthouse		Alderney	1912	32	37	A1536
Bréhon Tower		Guernsey	1856	7	19	A1559
Crocq Pierhead lighthouse		Saint Sampson		6	11	A1554
Castle Breakwater Lighthouse		Saint Peter Port	1850s	12	14	A1560
Casquets lighthouses		Alderney	1724	23	37	A1532
Les Hanois Lighthouse		Torteval	1862	36	33	A1580
St Martins Point Lighthouse		Jerbourg Point		5	15	A1574
Platte Fougère lighthouse		Saint Sampson	1910	25	25	A1548
Platte lighthouse		Little Roussel		6	9	A1550
Roustel Beacon		Little Roussel	1970	8	10	A1552
Sark Lighthouse		Point Robert	1913	17	65	A1544
St Sampsons South Pier, Range Rear		Saint Sampson	1874	12	13	A1558.1
Tautenay Lighthouse		Herm		8	7	A1548.5
Victoria Marina Lighthouse		Saint Peter Port Harbour		7	10	A1569
White Rock Pier Lighthouse		Saint Peter Port Harbour	1908	10	11	A1562

== Lighthouses in the Bailiwick of Jersey ==
Name	Image	Location & coordinates	Year built	Tower height (in metres)	Focal height (in metres)	Admiralty number
La Corbière Lighthouse		La Corbière	1874	19	36	A1620
St. Catherine's Breakwater Lighthouse		Saint Martin		9	18	A1586
Demie de Pas Lighthouse		Saint Helier	1904	13	11	A1598
Gorey Pier Lighthouse		Gorey	1966	9	8	A1588
Greve d'Azette Lighthouse		Saint Helier	1896	19	23	A1594
La Tour de Vinde		Saint Brelade	1915	10	18	A1616
Sorel Point Lighthouse		Saint John	1938	3	49.7	A1584
Mount Ube lighthouse		Saint Helier	1896	14	46	A1594.1

== See also ==
- Lists of lighthouses and lightvessels
