= Braye Road railway station =

Railway station in Alderney, Guernsey

Coordinates: 49.722°N 2.200°W

Braye Road
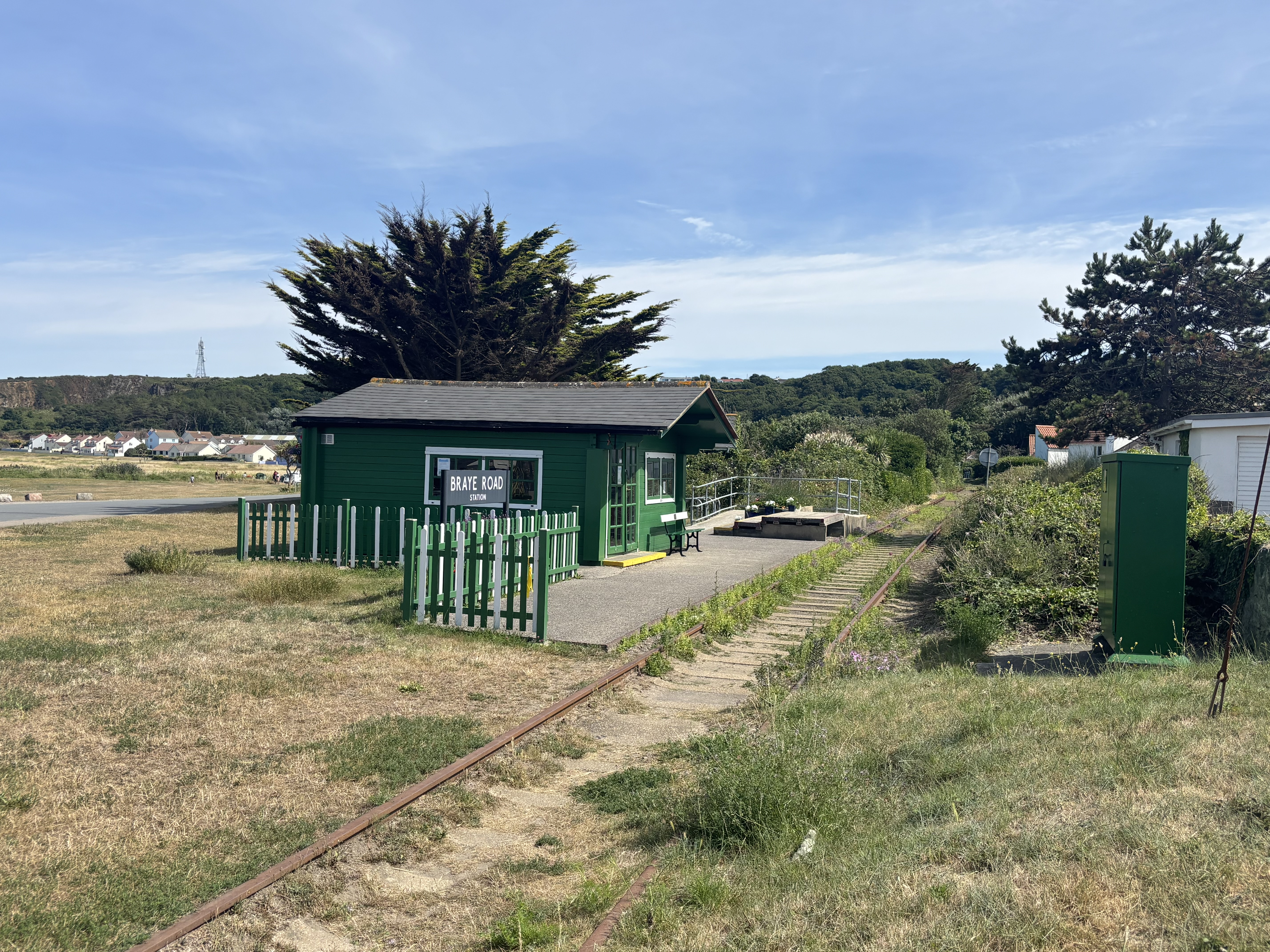
- Braye Road station in 2025

General information
- Location: Alderney; Bailiwick of Guernsey
- Managed by: Alderney Railway
- Platforms: 1

History
- Opened: 5 April 1980; 46 years ago
- Rebuilt: 2008
Location

Braye Road is a station on the Alderney Railway, on the island of Alderney. It runs along the Braye Harbour.

Described as "tiny", it is a station on the only working railway in the Channel Islands, where it crosses a major walking path. The station is one of two terminals of the Alderney Railway.

Until 2024, Alderney had restrictive laws as to the location of weddings. When that law was repealed, a couple was able to plan their wedding ceremony to start at the Braye Road Station, and continue on the train to the other terminal.

Preceding station	Heritage railways	Following station
Terminus	Alderney Railway	Mannez Quarry Terminus
