= Sark Lighthouse =

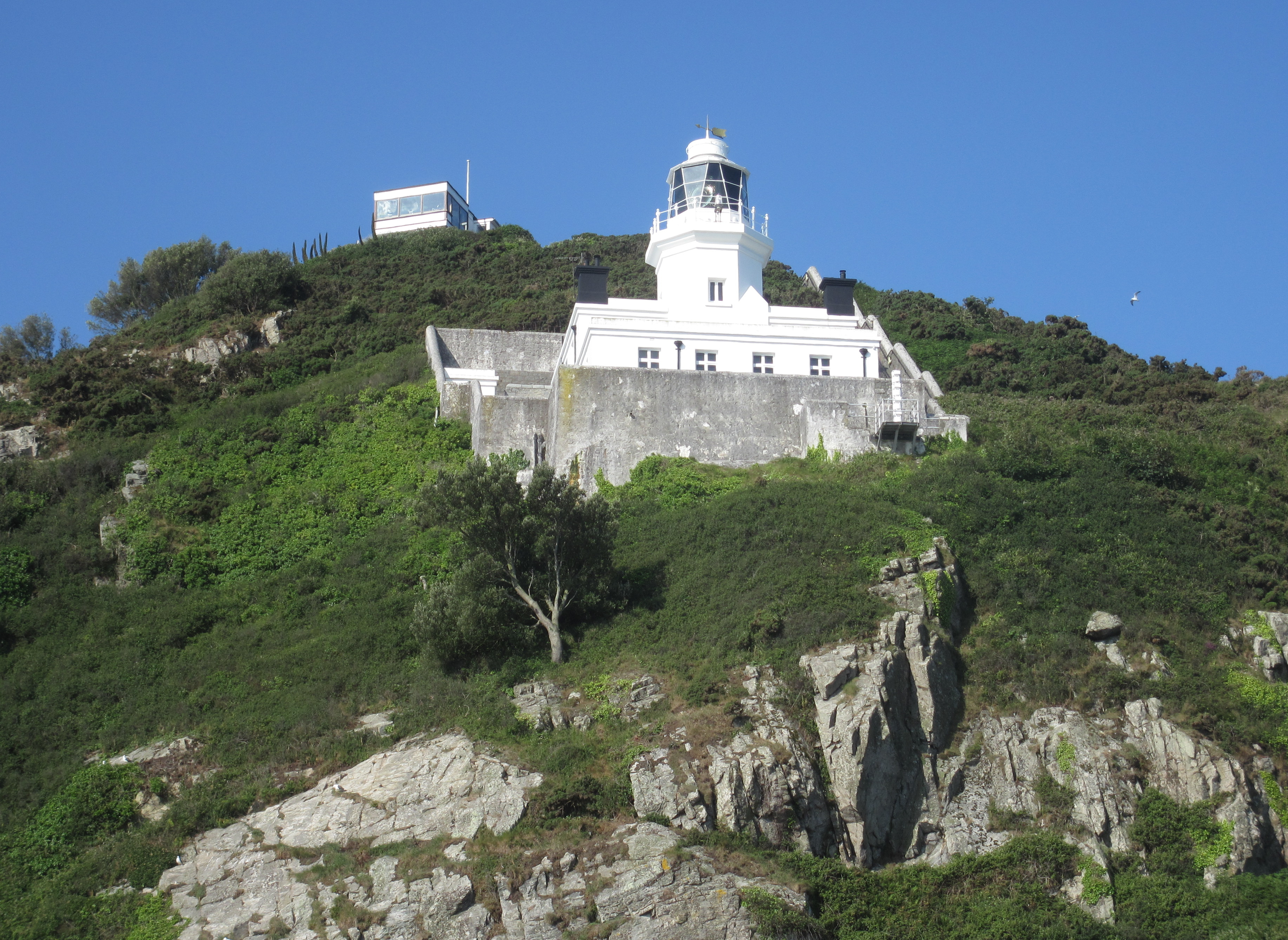
- Location: Point Robert, Sark; Channel Islands
- Coordinates: 49°26′11″N 2°20′44″W

Tower
- Constructed: 1913
- Construction: masonry tower
- Automated: 1994
- Height: 16 m (52 ft)
- Shape: octagonal tower
- Markings: white tower and keeper's house
- Fog signal: 2 blasts every 30 seconds (range 2 nmi (3.7 km; 2.3 mi))

Light
- Focal height: 65 m (213 ft)
- Lens: 2nd order catadioptric
- Intensity: 45,000 candela
- Range: 20 nmi (37 km; 23 mi)
- Characteristic: Fl W 15s.

Sark Lighthouse is an active lighthouse located on the side of cliffs at Point Robert, at the north east of Sark, and guides vessels passing through the Channel Islands away from Blanchard Rock, which lies several miles to the east. It was constructed by Trinity House in 1913 and comprises a white, octagonal tower rising from flat-roofed service rooms and cottages, all built of stone. Access is provided by steps down from the top of the cliff, but the lighthouse was automated in 1994 and is now remotely monitored from the Trinity House operations centre in Harwich, Essex.

Sark was a desirable place for lighthouse keepers to be posted. As it was considered a 'rock station', pay for serving there was good but it was not as remote as other lighthouses of that class. It might have been the only rock station where the keepers could go to the pub when not working.

== See also ==
- List of lighthouses in the Channel Islands

== Gallery of images ==
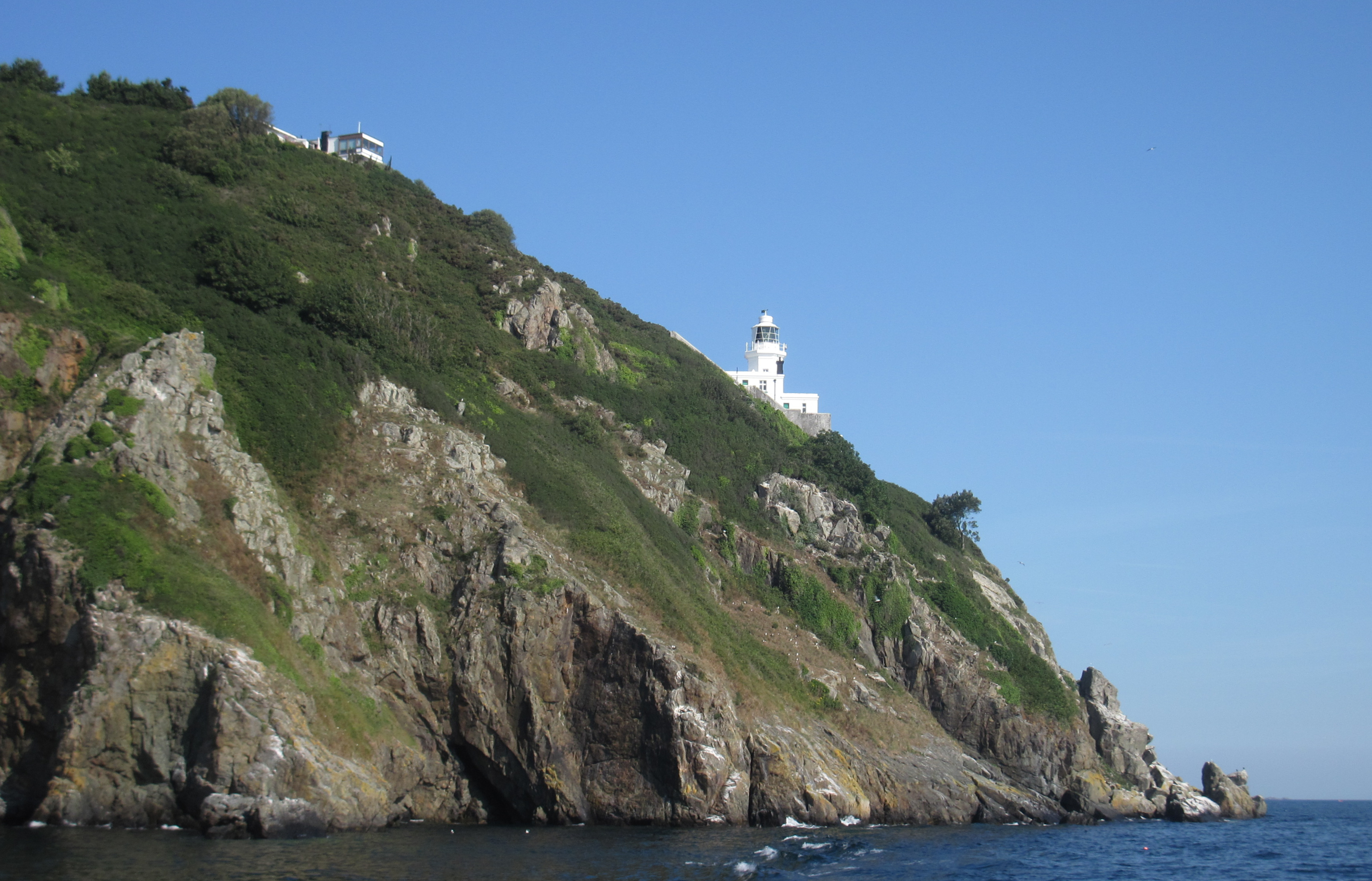

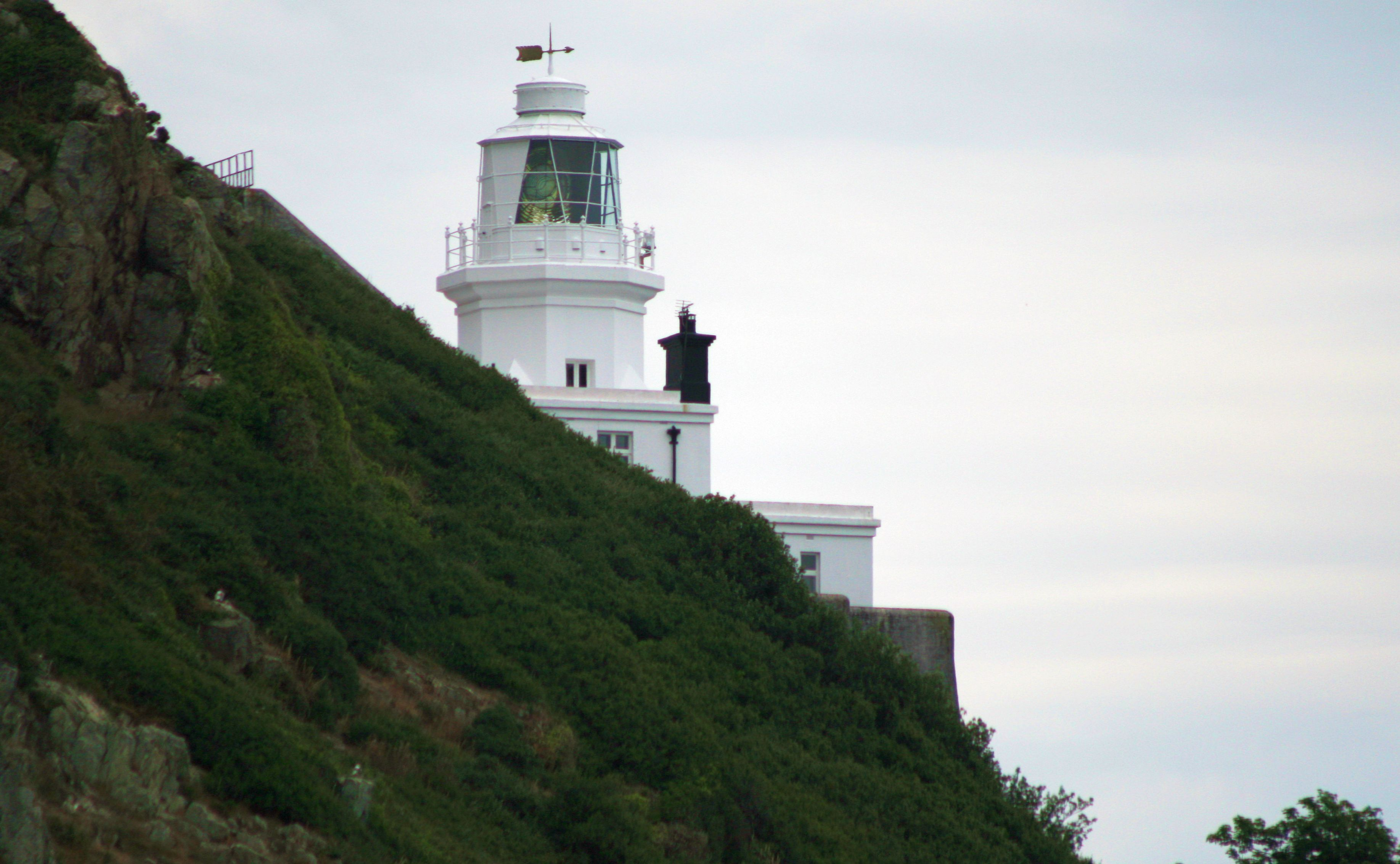

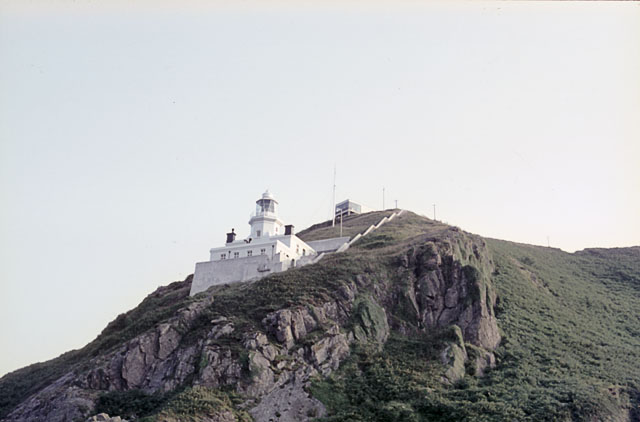

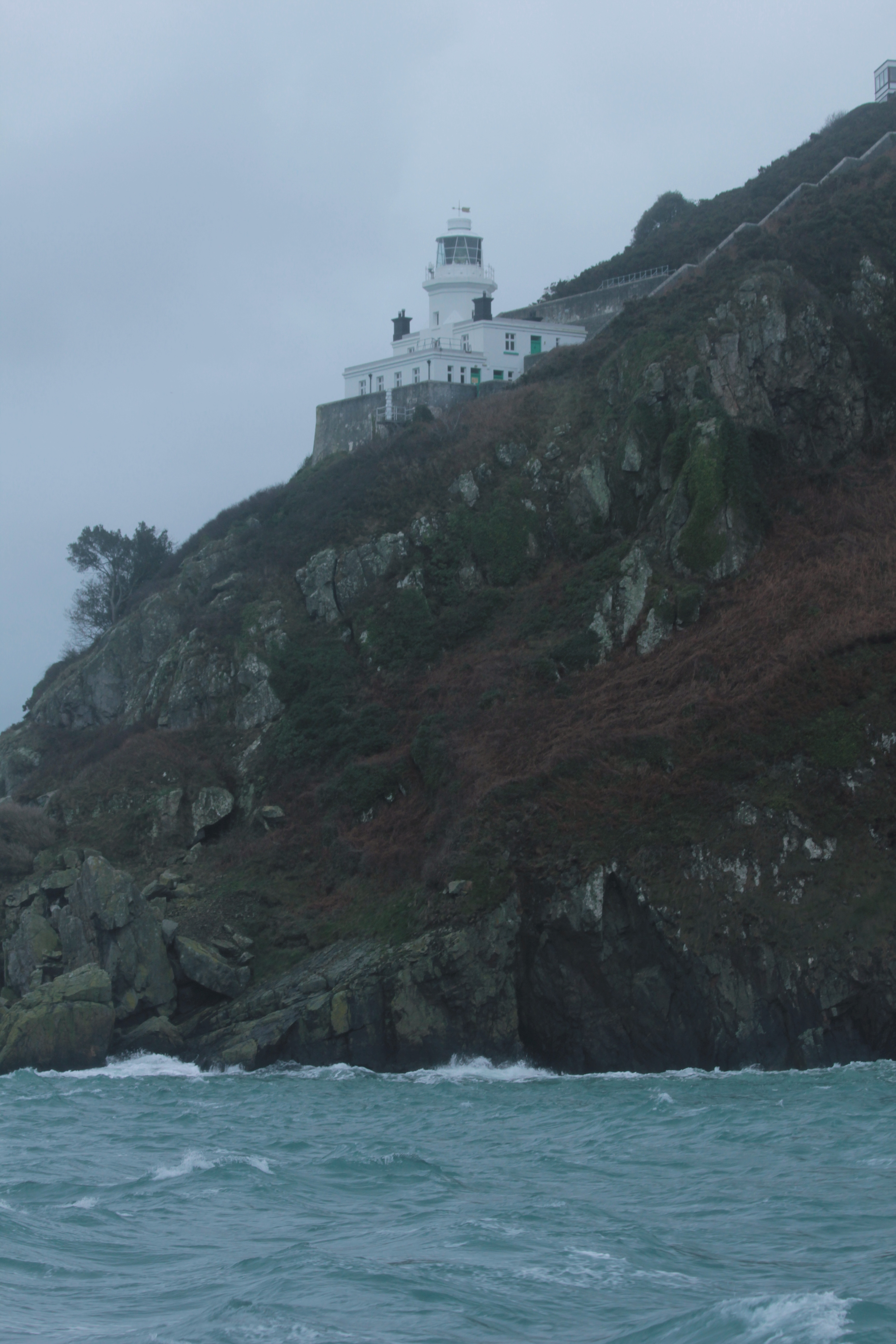
