= La Tour de Vinde =

La Tour de Vinde Noirmont Point Light
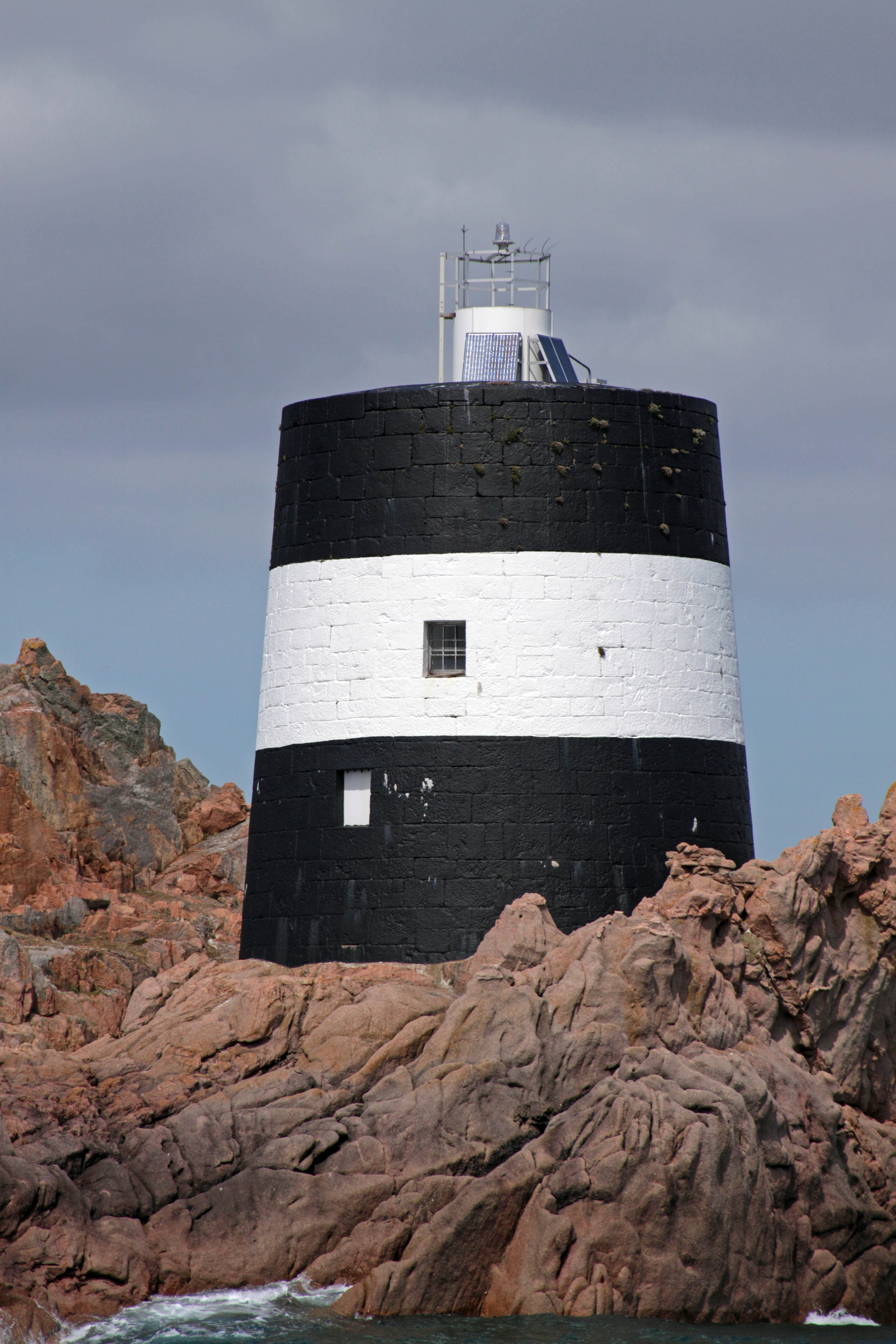
- La Tour de Vinde
- Location: St Aubin's Bay; Saint Brélade; Jersey
- Coordinates: 49.165270°N 2.168036°W

Tower
- Constructed: 1915
- Construction: stone tower
- Height: 10 metres (33 ft)
- Shape: cylindrical tower with the light on a mast
- Markings: black tower with a horizontal white band
- Operator: Jersey Harbours

Light
- Focal height: 18 metres (59 ft)
- Range: 13 nautical miles (24 km; 15 mi)
- Characteristic: Fl (4) W 12s.

La Tour de Vinde (aka Noirmont Tower) is a Martello tower that the British erected between 1808 and 1810 to command the approaches to St Aubin's Bay, Jersey. The tower stands at the foot of the cliffs of Noirmont Point, in the Vingtaine de Noirmont in the Parish of Saint Brélade. During the occupation of the Channel Islands in World War II, the Germans erected Battery Lothringen on the top of Noirmont Point. The site of the tower is accessible at low tide by foot, though the tower itself is closed to the public.

La Tour de Vinde is painted black and white to serve as a daymark for sailors. Since 1915 it has housed a light that at night flashes every 12 seconds. The tower is currently under the purview of the Harbour & Airport Committee.

== Name ==
The name comes from the Norse, where "vinde" means to tack or go about. Once a sailing vessel heading for St Aubin's Bay had passed the point it could tack to approach the harbour.

== Description ==
The tower was armed with a single 18-pounder gun on its top; there was a second 18-pounder in a battery at its base. The tower supports the second floor via arches instead of a central pillar. The tower's diameter is 26 ft (7.9 m) and it stands 23 ft (7.0 m) high.

== See also ==
- List of lighthouses in the Channel Islands

== Gallery ==
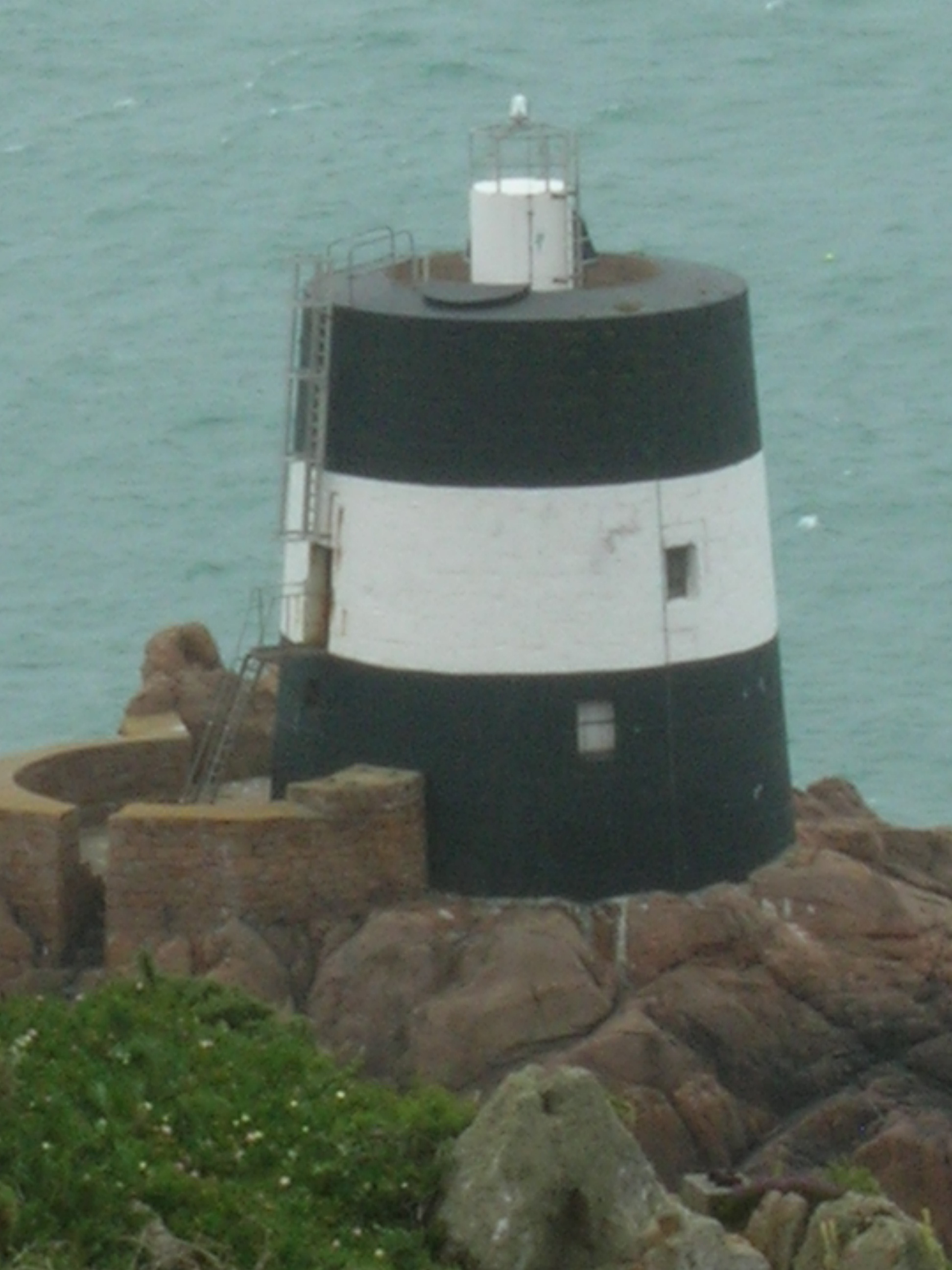

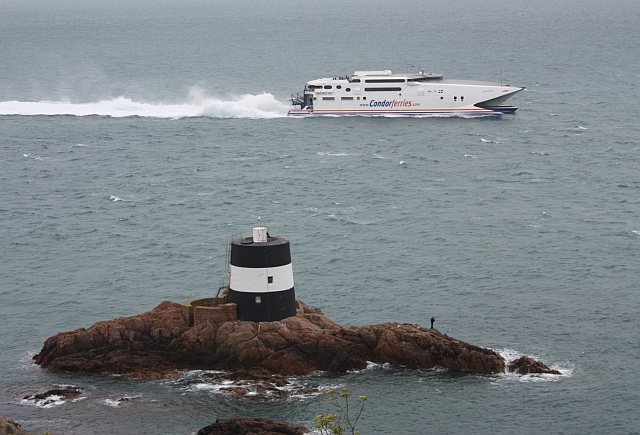

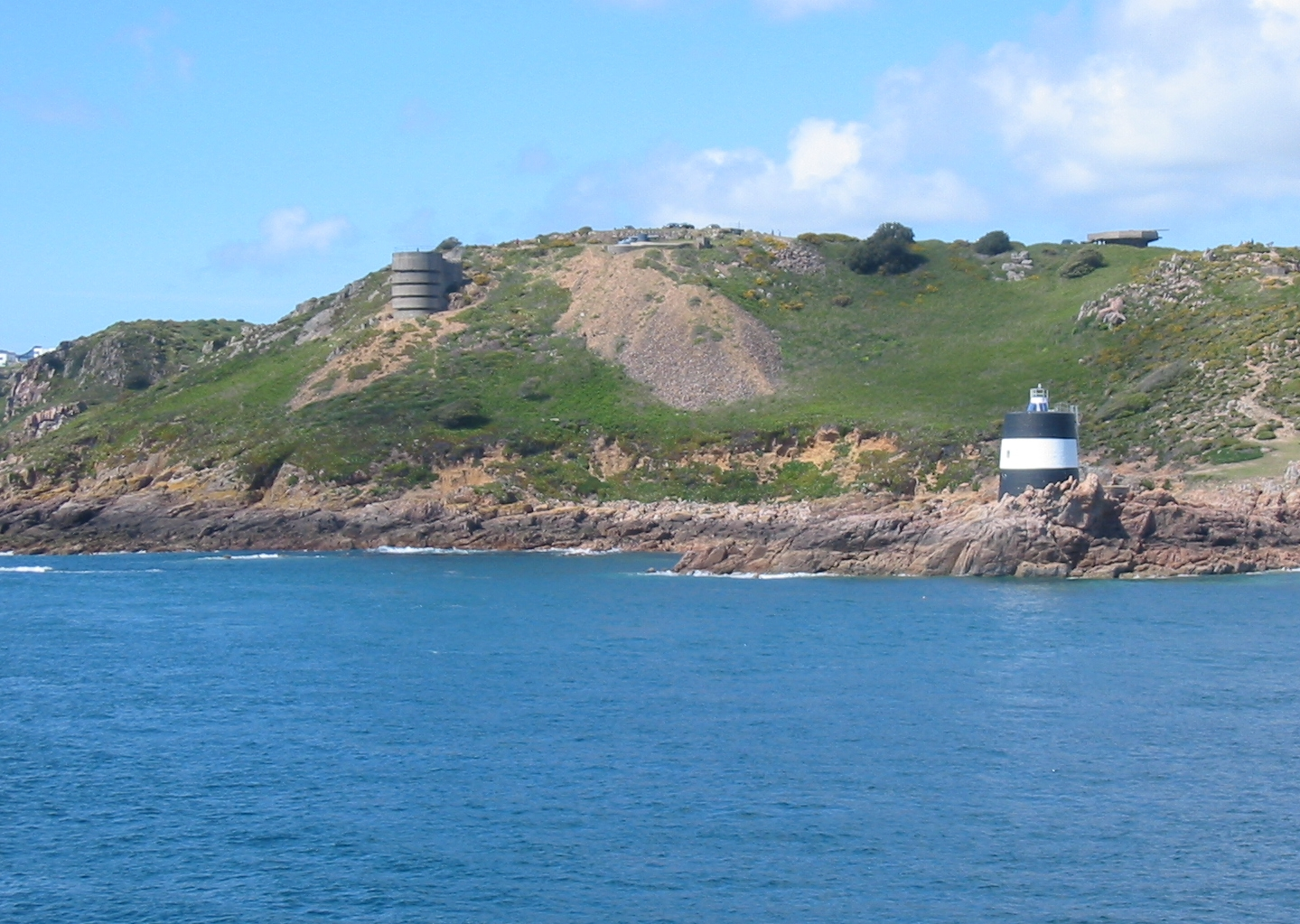

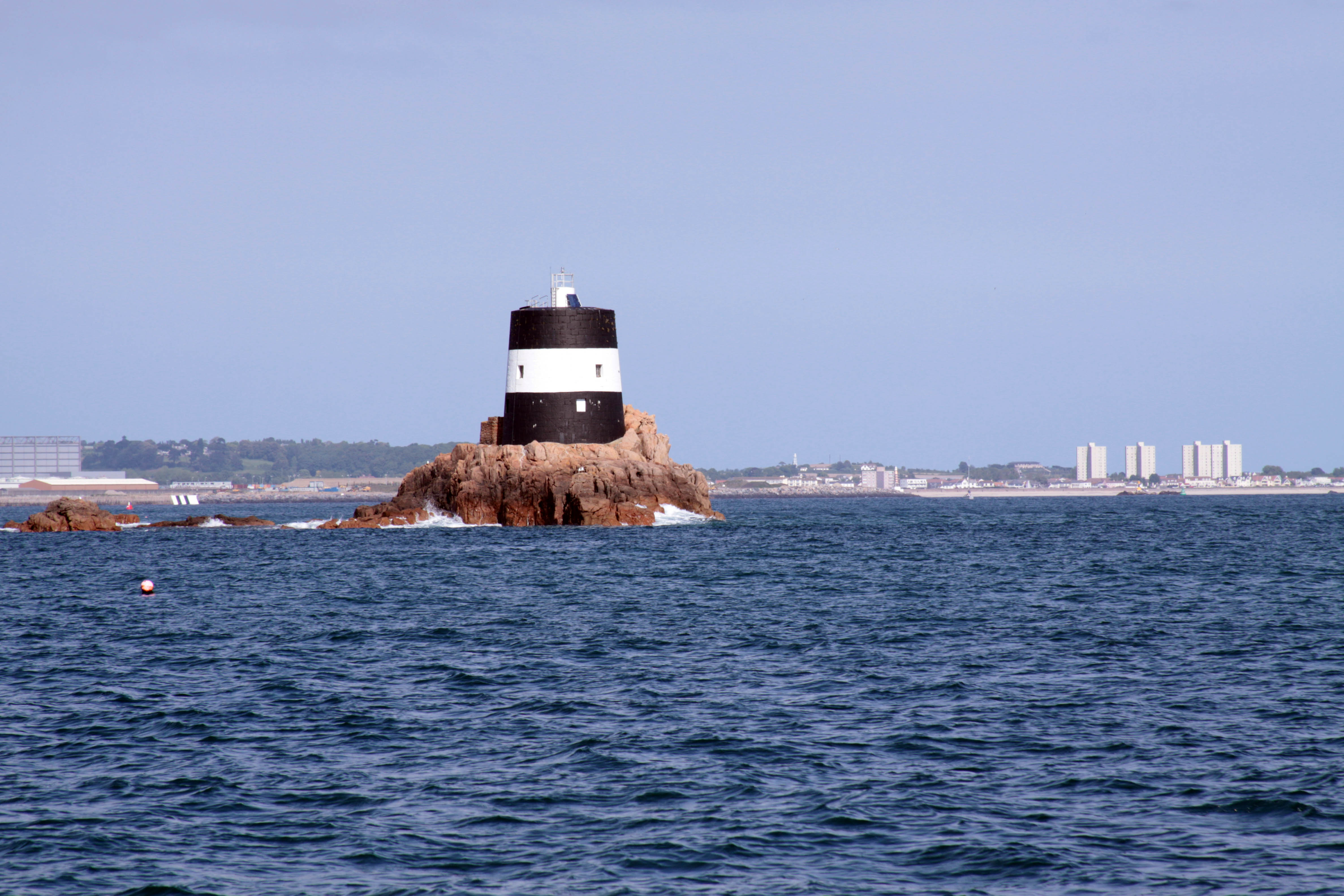

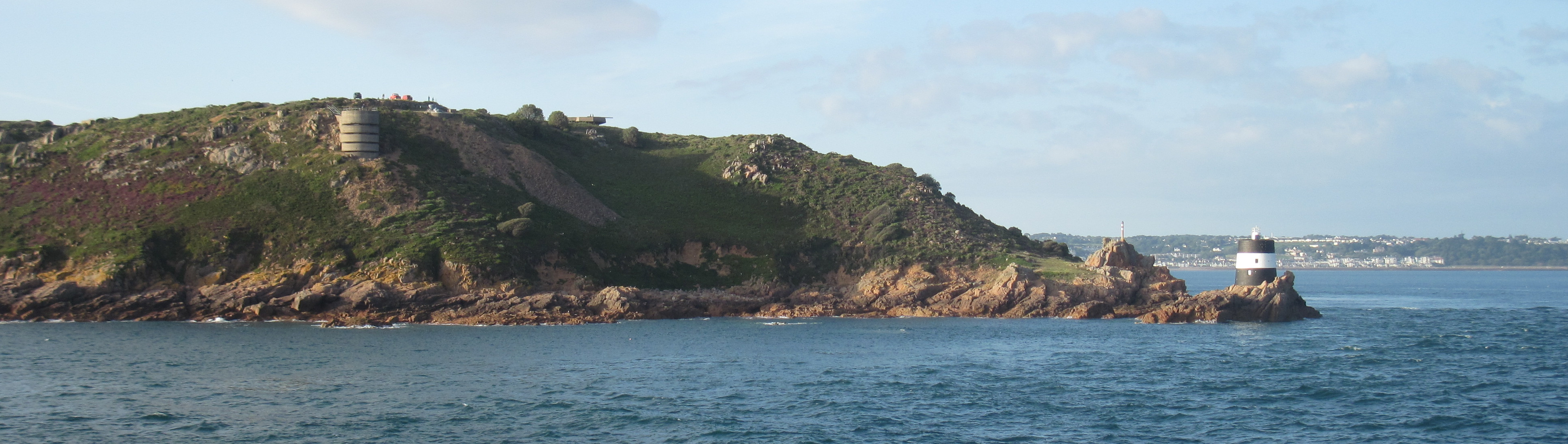
