= Alderney Railway =

Railway in Alderney, Channel Islands, UK

Coordinates: 49.718°N 2.200°W

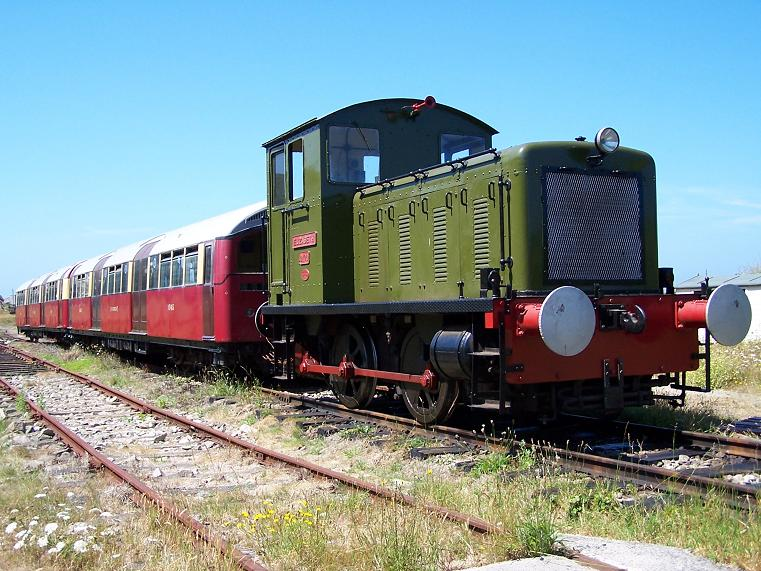
- Vulcan Drewry 0-4-0 diesel locomotive Elizabeth with former London Underground 1959 Stock carriages

Overview
- Locale: Alderney
- Website: https://www.alderneyrailway.gg/

History
- Opened: 1847
- British Admiralty: 1854–1923
- Channel Islands Granite Co Ltd: 1923–1940
- Alderney Railway Co Ltd: 1980–present

Technical
- Line length: 3 mi (4.8 km)
- Track length: 2 mi (3.2 km)
- Track gauge: 1,435 mm (4 ft 8 1/2 in) standard gauge
- Old gauge: 600 mm (1 ft 11 5/8 in) (1940-45)

The Alderney Railway on Alderney is the only railway in the Bailiwick of Guernsey, and the only working railway in the Channel Islands (there is a standard gauge railway at the Pallot Heritage Steam Museum in Jersey, but this provides no actual transport link, only pleasure rides). The Alderney Railway opened in 1847 and runs for about 2 miles (3.2 km), mostly following a coastal route, from Braye Road to Mannez Quarry and Lighthouse.

The railway is run by volunteers and usually operates during summer weekends and bank holidays.

== History ==
The railway was built by the British Government in the 1840s and opened in 1847. Its original purpose was to carry stone from the eastern end of the island to build the breakwater and the Victorian era forts.

Queen Victoria used the railway on three Royal visits to Alderney. On the first visit with Prince Albert on 8 August 1854, the Royal couple rode on a horse-drawn railway tender.

There are two stations on the line: Mannez Quarry and Braye Road.

== Rolling stock ==
=== British Admiralty (1854–1923) ===
(The railway was, presumably, owned by some other department of the British Government from 1847 to 1854)

Name	Date built	Builder	Works No.	Wheels	Cylinders	Notes	Withdrawn
Veteran	1847	?	?	0-6-0	Inside	arr. 1847	?
Fairfield	1847	?	?	0-6-0	Inside	arr. 1847	?
Waverley	?	Henry Hughes of Loughborough	?	0-4-0ST	Outside	-	1889
Bee	?	?	?	0-6-0T	?	-	?
Spider	?	?	?	0-6-0T	?	-	?
Gillingham	?	Aveling and Porter	?	0-6-0TG	?	arr. 1893	1893
No.1	1880	Hunslet Engine Company	231	0-6-0ST	Inside	arr. 1893	1923
No.2	1898	Peckett and Sons	696	0-4-0ST	Outside	arr. 1904	1923

=== Channel Islands Granite Company Ltd (1923–1940) ===
The Channel Islands Granite Company took over the railway in 1923, along with locomotives No.1 and No.2. No.1 was returned to England and replaced by Manning Wardle 0-6-0ST Nitro.

=== German occupation (1940–1945) ===
No.2 and Nitro were commandeered by the Germans and are believed to have been shipped to Cherbourg in 1943 or 1944. The Germans lifted part of the standard gauge line and replaced it with a 600 mm gauge line, worked by two Feldbahn 0-4-0 diesel locomotives.

=== British Home Office (1945–50s) ===
The line was restored to standard gauge in 1947–1949 and the following stock was used:

- Sentinel 4wVBT Molly, in service from 1947, withdrawn 1958. May have been converted to a mobile sand-blaster, which was still extant in 1980. Scrapped in 2024.
- Cowans Sheldon steam crane
- Ruston & Hornsby 0-4-0 diesel Molly II
- Wickhams Type 27A trolleys

=== Alderney Railway Co Ltd (1980–present) ===
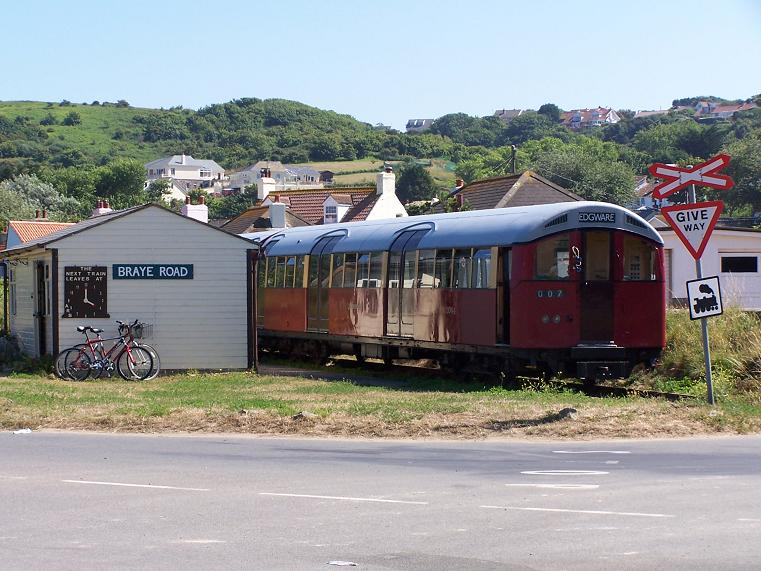
London Underground 1959 Stock stock stabled at Braye Road station

- Bagnall 0-4-0ST J.T. Daly, steam engine built in 1931, in service 1982 until 1996 when sold to the Pallot Heritage Steam Museum, Jersey
- London Underground 1938 Stock from Bakerloo and Northern lines, badly rusted and returned to UK in 2000 as spares.
- Former London Underground 1959 Stock cars nos. 1044 and 1045,
- A Vulcan Drewry 0-4-0 diesel locomotive no. D100 Elizabeth, bought in 1985.
- A Ruston & Hornsby 0-4-0 diesel Molly II
- Six Wickham rail cars.

Molly II is currently awaiting modification to her coupler system, so she can haul the London Underground stock. However, this cannot happen at the moment because she is not yet owned by the Alderney Railway company.

Sheds to house the engines and railway stock were built at Mannez quarry in 1997 and 2008.

Notes

- arr. = date arrived on Alderney

== See also ==
- List of Channel Islands railways

== Bibliography ==
- Railways of the Channel Islands, A Pictorial Survey compiled by C Judge, published by The Oakwood Press 1992, ISBN 0-85361-432-6
