= Abraham Dumaresq, 2nd Seigneur of Augrès =

Abraham Dumaresq, 2nd Seigneur of Augres (1571-1631), held the manorial fief of Les Augrès, in the Island of Jersey and would be the first of the Des Augres branch of the Dumaresq Family.

== Early life ==
Abraham Dumaresq was born to John Dumaresq, Seigneur of Vincheles de Bas and of Gorge and Collette Dumaresq, daughter of Clement Dumaresq, Seigneur of Samares and Margaret de Carteret. His father was the son of Richard Dumaresq, Seigneur of Vincheles and of St. Gorge and Collette Larbalestier who was the daughter and heiress of Anthony Larbalestier, 1st Seigneur of Augres. Through his grandmother Abraham would inherit Les Augres and the title of Seigneur of Augres.

== Family ==
Abraham married Susan de Carteret daughter of Sir Philip de Carteret, Seigneur of Sark and Seigneur Saint Ouen and Rachel Paulet and had the following issue:

- Elias Dumaresq, 3rd Seigneur of Augres (1620-1677), married Jane Payne and had issue:
  - Elias Dumaresq, 4th Seigneur of Augres
  - Philip Dumaresq
  - Lieutenant Edward Dumaresq, RN
  - John Dumaresq, Greffier of the Royal Court
  - Anne Dumaresq
  - Benjamin Dumaresq
  - Elizabeth Dumaresq
- Benjamin Dumaresq, Jurat (1626-1680) married Elizabeth De Carteret and had issue:
  - Colonel Philip Dumaresq, Seigneur of Anneville (1671-1714)
  - Marie Dumaresq (1678-1734)
- Gideon Dumaresq
- Anne Dumaresq (1627-1700) married Sir Philip Carteret,1st Baronet and had issue:
  - Sir Philip Carteret, 2nd Baronet
- Captain John Dumaresq (1628-1689) married Elizabeth le Goupil and had issue:
  - Major John Dumaresq (ancestor of Elizabeth Dumaresq, William John Dumaresq, Henry Dumaresq, and Edward Dumaresq)
  - Captain George Dumaresq, Deputy Governor of Jersey
