= Dumaresq (surname) =

Dumaresq is a surname, and may refer to:

- Charles Édouard Armand-Dumaresq, French painter
- Daniel Dumaresq, Channel Islands-born Anglican priest, who served as an educational advisor to the Russian and Polish monarchies
- Edward Dumaresq (1802–1906), landowner in Van Diemen's Land
- Elie Dumaresq (1674-1754), Seigneur of Augres, Jersey
- Henry Dumaresq (1839–1924), Australian politician
- John Saumarez Dumaresq, Australian-born Royal Navy officer
- Michelle Dumaresq, Canadian professional downhill mountain-biker
- Philip Dumaresq (c. 1650–1690), Seigneur of Samarès, Jersey
- William Dumaresq (1793–1868), English-born Australian politician.
