= Dumaresq family =

Channelean patrician family

The Dumaresq family was a patrician family in the Channel Islands with a particularly strong presence in Jersey. The family held many offices and positions throughout the history of Jersey from the 13th century.

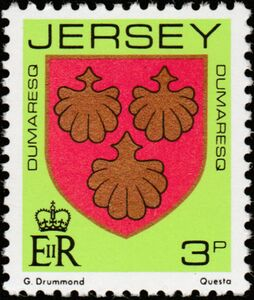
Dumaresq arms

== Origins ==
The family is said to come from Norman origins where the original members of the family arrived in Jersey; however, the family is first mentioned in Jersey during the year 1292 on the Exchequer, 21 Edward I, where it mentions a Jordan Du Maresq who was a Jurat of the Royal Court of Jersey.

== Titles ==
The Dumaresq family held the following titles:

- Seigneur of Augres
- Seigneur of La Haule
- Seigneur of Samarès
- Seigneur of Vincheles de Bas

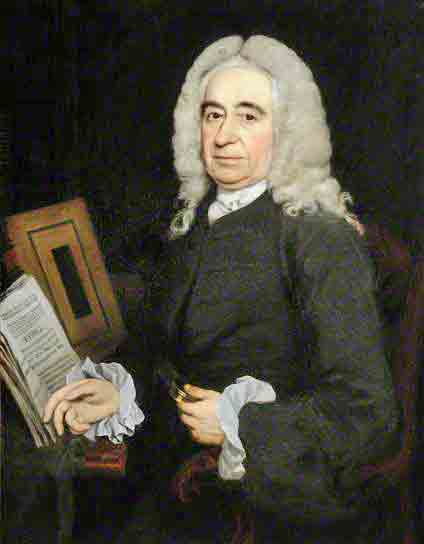
Rev. Daniel Dumaresq FRS

== Notable members ==
- Rev. Daniel Dumaresq FRS
- Rear-Admiral John Saumarez Dumaresq CB, CVO
- Elias Dumaresq, 5th Seigneur of Augres
- John Dumaresq, Seigneur of Vincheles de Bas
- Lieutenant Colonel John Dumaresq
- Elias Dumaresq, 3rd Seigneur des Augres
- Sir John Dumaresq
- Captain Philip Dumaresq, Seigneur of Samarès
- Captain Philip Dumaresq (Captain of HMS Victory)
- Lieutenant Colonel Henry Dumaresq (1792–1838)
- Elizabeth Dumaresq (wife of Sir Ralph Darling, Governor of New South Wales)
- Admiral Thomas Dumaresq (1729–1802)
- Thomas Dumaresq, Seigneur of Vinchelez de Bas and of Gorge
- Henry Dumaresq, Seigneur of Samarès
- Charles Dumaresq, Lieutenant Bailiff of Jersey (1712–1713)
- Captain William John Dumaresq (1793–1868)
- Captain Edward Dumaresq (1802–1906)
- Charles Édouard Armand-Dumaresq KSS
- James Dumaresq

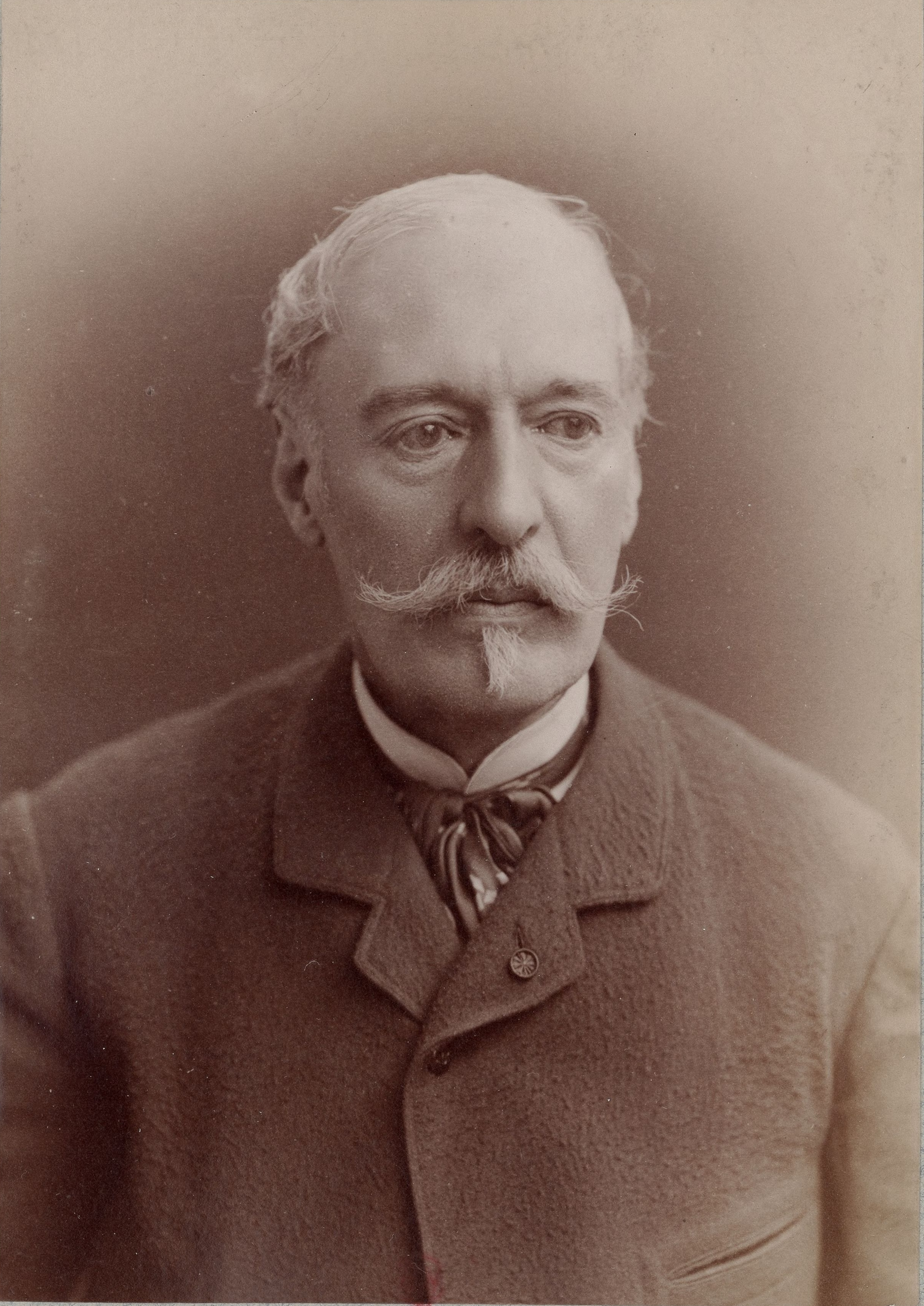
Charles Édouard Armand-Dumaresq

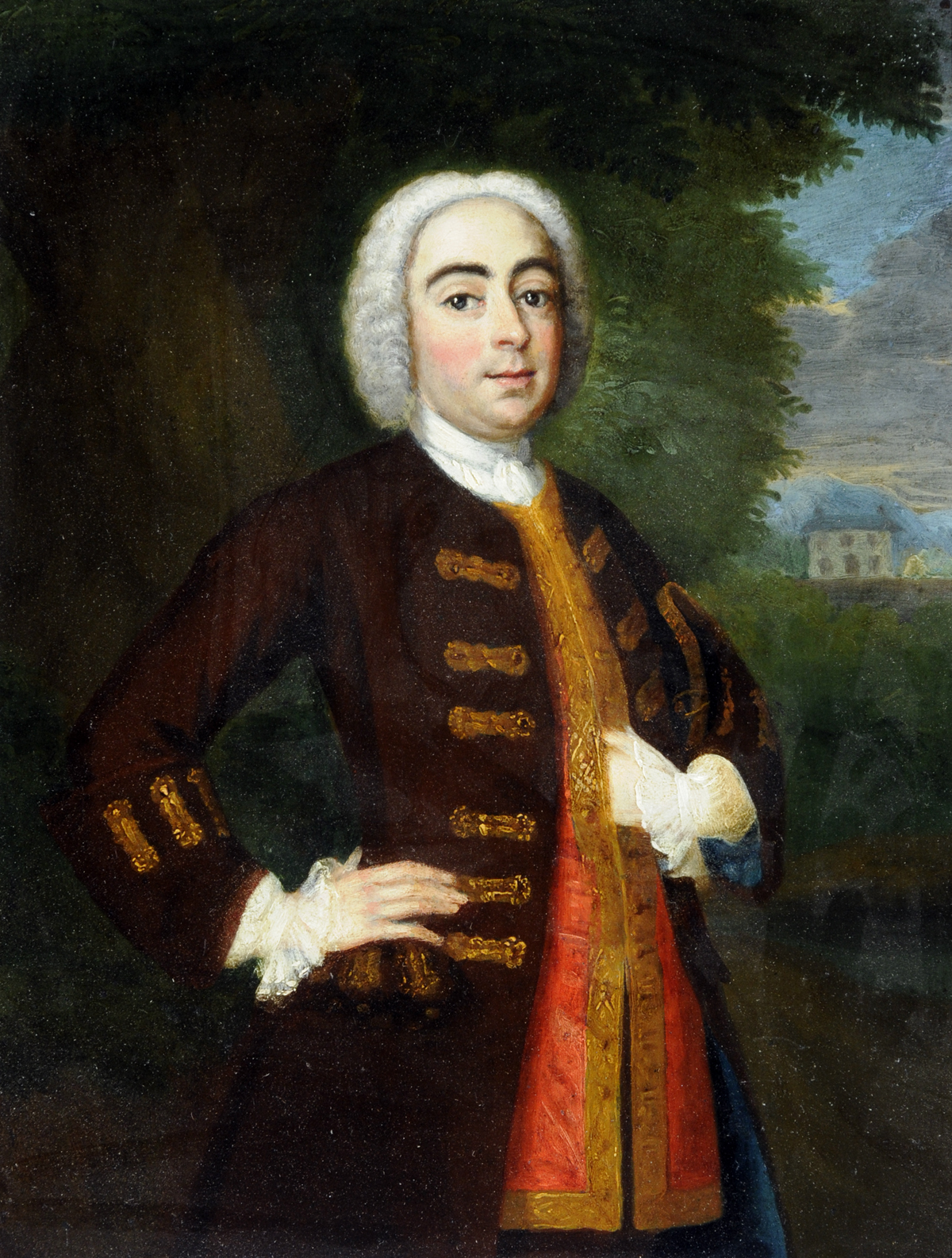
Charles Dumaresq, Lieutenant Bailiff of Jersey

- Dandelle Marie Dumaresq (1636–1694), mother of Rear Admiral Thomas Le Hardy and great-grandmother of Wenman Coke, ancestor of the Earls of Leicester, Sarah Ferguson, the Earls of Suffolk and Berkshire, the Earls of Dartmouth and the Earls Howe.
