= Church of St Bartholomew, Yeovilton =

Church in Somerset, England

Church of St Bartholomew
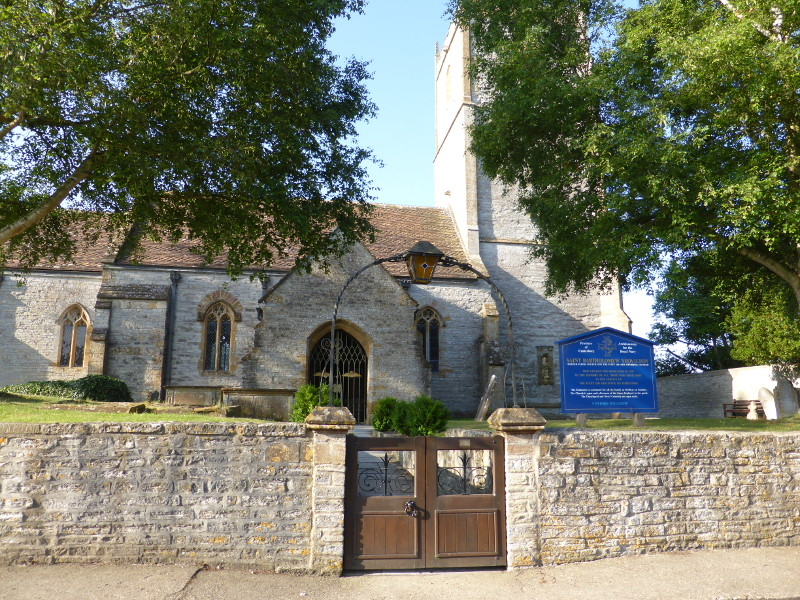

- Location within Somerset
- 51°00′17″N 2°38′51″W
- Location: Yeovilton, Somerset, England

History
- Built: c. 1300

Listed Building – Grade II*
- Official name: Church of Saint Bartholomew
- Designated: 19 April 1961
- Reference no.: 1056787

The Church of St Bartholomew in the parish of Yeovilton, Somerset, England, was built around 1300. It is a Grade II* listed building.

The church became the property of Montacute Priory and then part of the Diocese of Bath and Wells. It still contains some fabric and fittings from the 14th and 15th centuries but underwent a major restoration in the Victorian era.

The church fell into disrepair in the 20th century but has been taken over and restored as the Fleet Air Arm’s Memorial Church following links since World War II with the nearby airbase RNAS Yeovilton.

== History ==
The original Norman church was built of local lias stone with Hamstone dressings. It was granted by Sir William of Yeovilton to Montacute Priory between 1272 and 1282, who then sold it to Robert Burnell the Bishop of Bath and Wells and it eventually became part of the Diocese of Bath and Wells. From 1642 Richard Sterne held the rectory of Yeovilton before going on to become Archbishop of York. The rector between 1762 and 1805 was Daniel Dumaresq after his period as an educational consultant to Russian and Polish monarchs.

The chancel contains a 14th-century piscina and some 15th-century stained glass. The nave has a 15th-century font.

The vestry was added in 1872, when a major Victorian restoration was undertaken, and the wagon roof replaced.

== Tower and bells ==
The three stage tower was built in 1486. The money for this was donated by Richard Swan, the rector at the time. It contains six bells, the oldest of which dates from around 1430 and was cast at the Exeter Bell foundry. The most recent was added in 1993 and was cast at the Whitechapel Bell Foundry.

== Fleet Air Arm Memorial Church ==
In the first half of the 20th century the church was falling into disrepair until after World War II an association developed with the staff from the nearby RNAS Yeovilton. The churchyard contains 15 graves of British and Commonwealth forces during World War II mostly from the airbase. By 1988 the fabric of the building was considered unsafe and the church declared redundant, and was sold to the Royal Navy for £1. Restoration work was carried out funded by public donation and, in 1993, the church was reopened as the Fleet Air Arm’s Memorial Church. The church holds the Fleet Air Arm's Roll of Honour.

New porch gates, which were made at HMS Daedalus and carry the emblem of the Fleet Air Arm, have been installed. Within the Fleet Air Arm Memorial Chapel modern stained glass has been installed with the badges of RNAS stations Gannet, Osprey, Heron, Seahawk and Daedalus.

== See also ==
- List of ecclesiastical parishes in the Diocese of Bath and Wells
