= Edward Smith Hall =

English newspaper editor and convict (1786–1860)

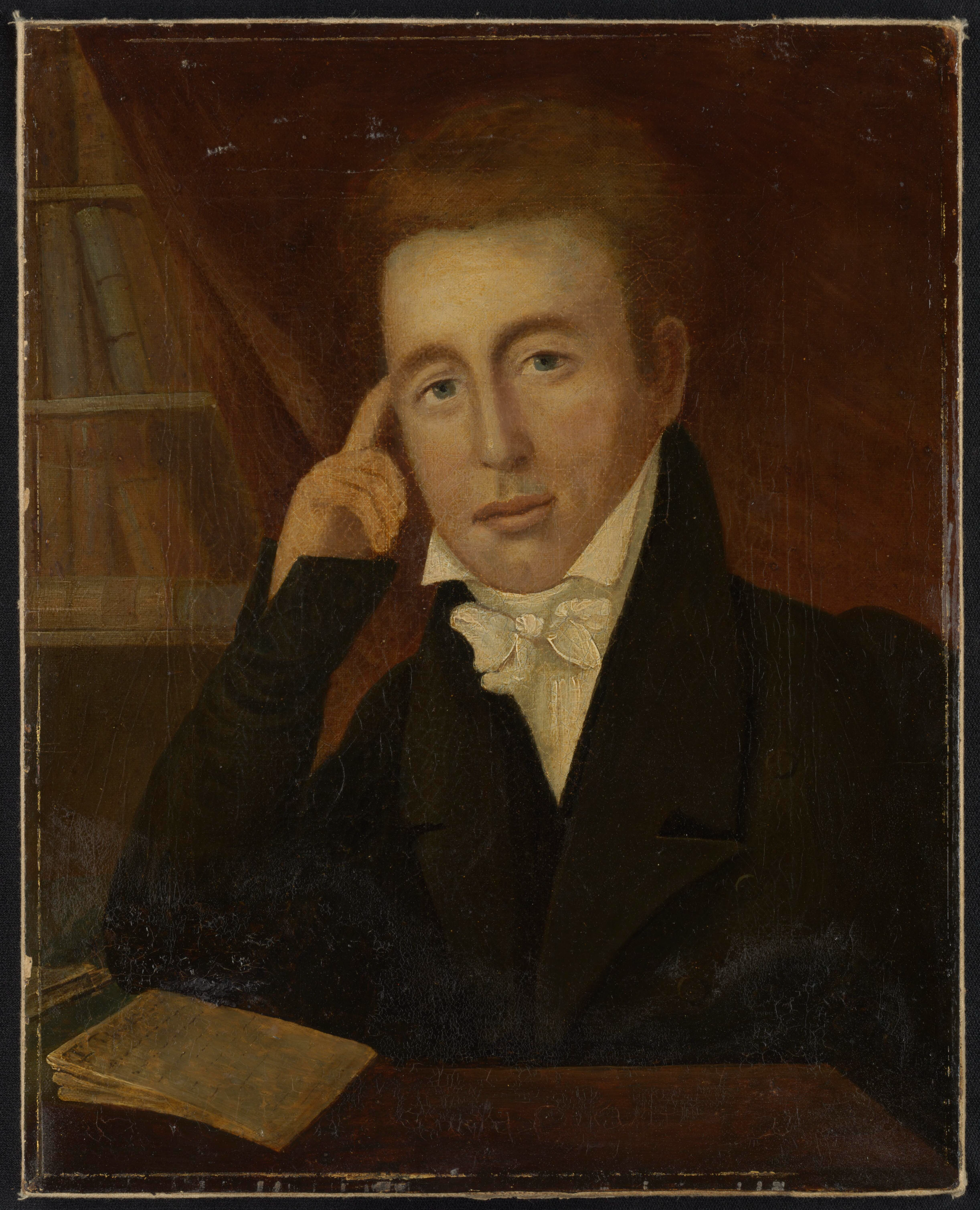
- Born: 28 March 1786; London, England
- Died: 18 September 1860 (aged 74); New South Wales, Australia
- Citizenship: Australia
- Known for: Founding The Monitor
- Spouses: Charlotte Hall (m. 1810–1826); Sarah Holmes (m. 1831–1838); Emily Tandy (m. 1842)
- Children: 12
- Parents: Smith Hall; Jane Drewry
- Criminal information
- Motive: Expose oppression made by General Ralph Darling

Details
- Date apprehended: 1828
- Imprisoned at: Sydney Gaol

Edward Smith Hall (28 March 1786 – 18 September 1860) was an English convict, newspaper editor, banker and grazier who established and published the Australian newspaper The Monitor in December 1826, where he edited there for 14 years. He is known for being jailed after publishing attacks against government officials.

== Early life ==
Edward Smith Hall was born on 28 March 1786 in London, England to parents Smith Hall and Jane Hall (née Drewry). He was one of six sons and grew up near Folkingham, Lincolnshire. His father was manager of a private bank.

Hall moved to Australia in 1812, where he joined Simeon Lord in forming a company to trade with New Zealand.

In 1817, he was appointed as the first cashier and secretary of the Bank of New South Wales, better known now as Westpac. During this time, he was one of the founders of the Benevolent Asylum of New South Wales.

=== Political career ===
Hall was appointed as Coroner of the Territory of New South Wales by governor Lachlan Macquarie, and served from November 1819 until he resigned in October 1821. He was granted 1000 acres of land near Lake Bathurst. In 1851, he bought land in Bondi Beach from Charles Roberts.

== The Monitor ==
Hall founded The Monitor on 19 May 1826 with Arthur Hill and released the first issue on the same day. It influenced public opinion and was known for condemning Governor Ralph Darling for oppressive rule. As a result, Darling punished Hall by withdrawing his right to graze stock on waste land adjacent to St Heliers. He also attempted to impose a stamp duty of a copy of 4d. Hall was eventually prosecuted as a result of ignorance and continuing to release weekly issues.

=== Sentence ===
In 1828, he was sentenced to the Sydney Gaol, a colonial prison, after publishing an attack on an issue against Archdeacon Thomas Scott who had evicted him from a pew in St James' Church. He continued to write issues in prison. In 1830, after the coronation of King William IV, Darling released Hall from prison. Hall continued to fight for press freedom, making criticism against Darling and other government officials.

== Personal life ==
Hall married Charlotte Hall on 21 December 1810 at St Luke's Church and had two sons and seven daughters. After Charlotte's death in 1826, Hall was widowed for a while before marrying Sarah Holmes in 1831. They had one son and daughter before Sarah's death in 1838. Hall finally married Emily Tandy and had one son. Hall died in New South Wales on 18 September 1860.

== See also ==
- The Monitor
- Ralph Darling
- Government of New South Wales
- List of newspapers in New South Wales
