= Dumaresq (disambiguation) =

Dumaresq may refer to:

Locations

- Armidale Dumaresq Shire, a former local government area in north-eastern New South Wales
- Dumaresq, New South Wales, an old stop on a New South Wales railway line
- Dumaresq Creek, running through Armidale in Armidale Dumaresq Shire
- Dumaresq Lake, a lake in Nova Scotia, Canada
- Dumaresq River, an Australian river that forms part of the border between New South Wales and Queensland

People

- Dumaresq (surname)

Technology

- Dumaresq, an analogue computer designed in 1902 to assist in warship gunnery
