= L'Anse-au-Clair =

- Town
- Location within Newfoundland and Labrador
- Coordinates: 51°26′00″N 57°04′02″W
- Country: Canada
- Province: Newfoundland and Labrador
- Settled: 1825

Area
  - Land: 61.92 km^{2} (23.91 sq mi)

Population (2021)
  - Total: 219
  - Density: 3.5/km^{2} (9.1/sq mi)
- Time zone: UTC-4:00 (Atlantic Time)
  - Summer (DST): UTC-3:00 (Atlantic Daylight)
- Area code: 709
- Highways: Route 510 (Trans-Labrador Highway); R-138

L'Anse-au-Clair is a town in the Labrador portion of Newfoundland and Labrador, Canada. Touching the small portion of Labrador’s southern ocean, the town has a population of 219 in the 2021 census, up from 192 in 2011.

It is located on Route 510, about 3 kilometres (1.9 mi) from the Quebec–Labrador border. It was established by the French in the early 18th century. People began to settle in the L'Anse-au-Clair area after the Quebec–Labrador border dispute was settled in 1825.

The settlement of L'Anse au Cotard, an area near the town, is attributed to Jersey fishermen and merchants coming to the region, with the earliest known permanent resident being James Dumaresq from the Dumaresq family who decided to build a home in the region around 1810. Descendants of Dumaresq and other Jersey families still inhabit the region and Canada as a whole.

== Demographics ==
In the 2021 Census of Population conducted by Statistics Canada, L'Anse-au-Clair had a population of 219 living in 98 of its 111 total private dwellings, a change of 1.4% from its 2016 population of 216. With a land area of 60.65 km^{2} (23.42 sq mi), it had a population density of 3.6/km^{2} (9.4/sq mi) in 2021.

In 2006, L'Anse-au-Clair had a Francophone population of 10, or 4.4% of the population. This was lowest figure among Newfoundland and Labrador's Division No. 10 subdivisions alongside North West River. In a 2004 Supreme Court decision (known as Chubbs et al. v Newfoundland and Labrador), Newfoundland and Labrador recognised L'Anse-au-Clair Francophone families' right to French-language education, but instead of building a local school, it paid for children in southern Labrador to attend a nearby French school approximately 8 km away in the border municipality of Lourdes-de-Blanc-Sablon, Quebec. As of 2013 this agreement had reportedly still been in place.
