= Samarès Manor =

Manor house in Jersey

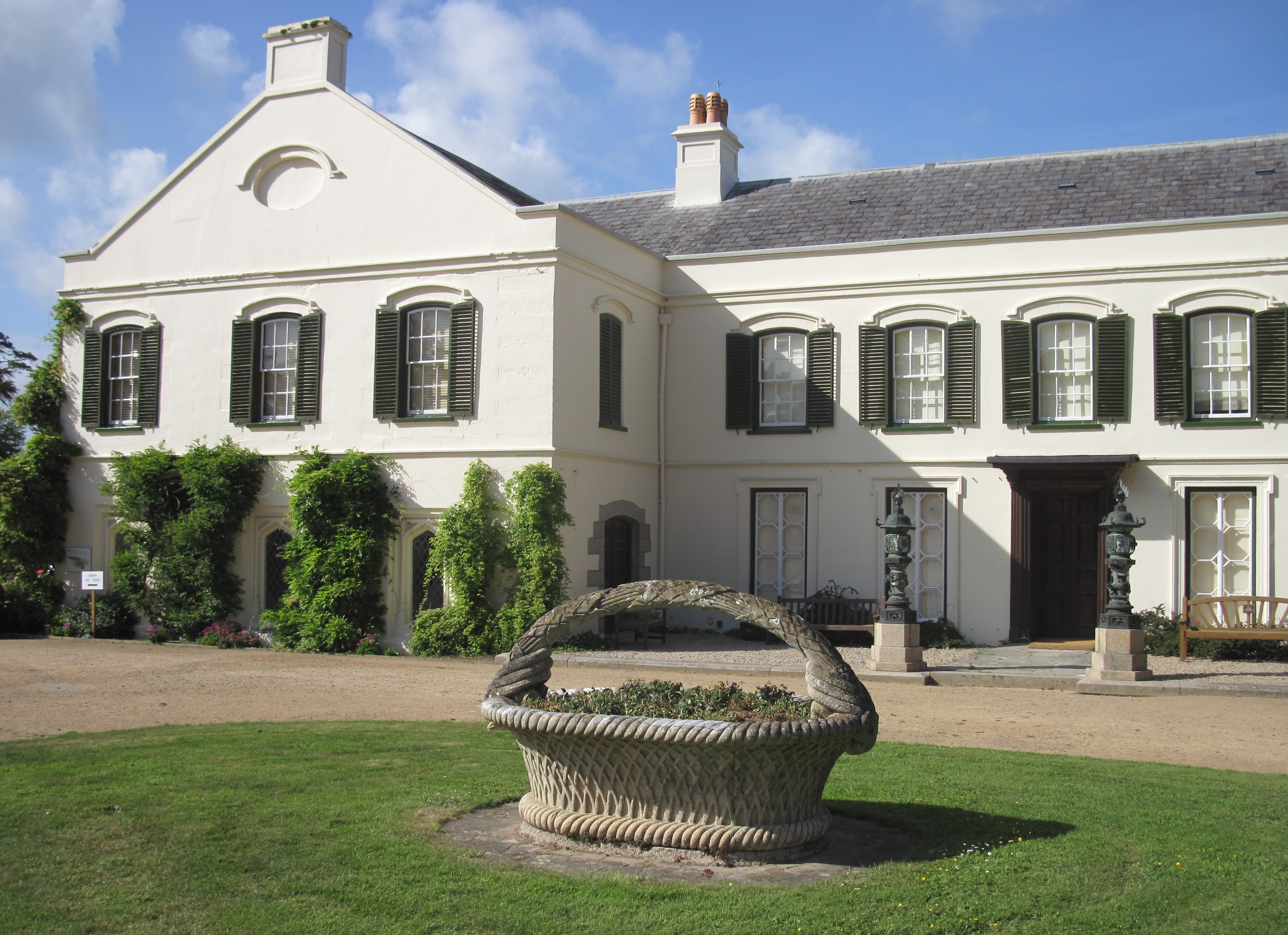
- The Manor House in 2011.

- Location within Channel Islands
- Alternative names: Le Manoir de Samarès

General information
- Location: Parish of St. Clement, Jersey
- Coordinates: 49.173862°N 2.077726°W
- Construction started: 13th Century

Website
- www.samaresmanor.com

Samarès Manor (Jèrriais: Mangni d'Sanmathès) is a manor house with medieval origins in the Vingtaine de Samarès, in the parish of St. Clement in Jersey, and is the traditional home of the Seigneur de Samarès. The name Samarès is an old French word meaning salt-marsh, and much of the low-lying surrounding areas are or were coastal marshes.

The gardens are open to the public from April until October.

== History ==
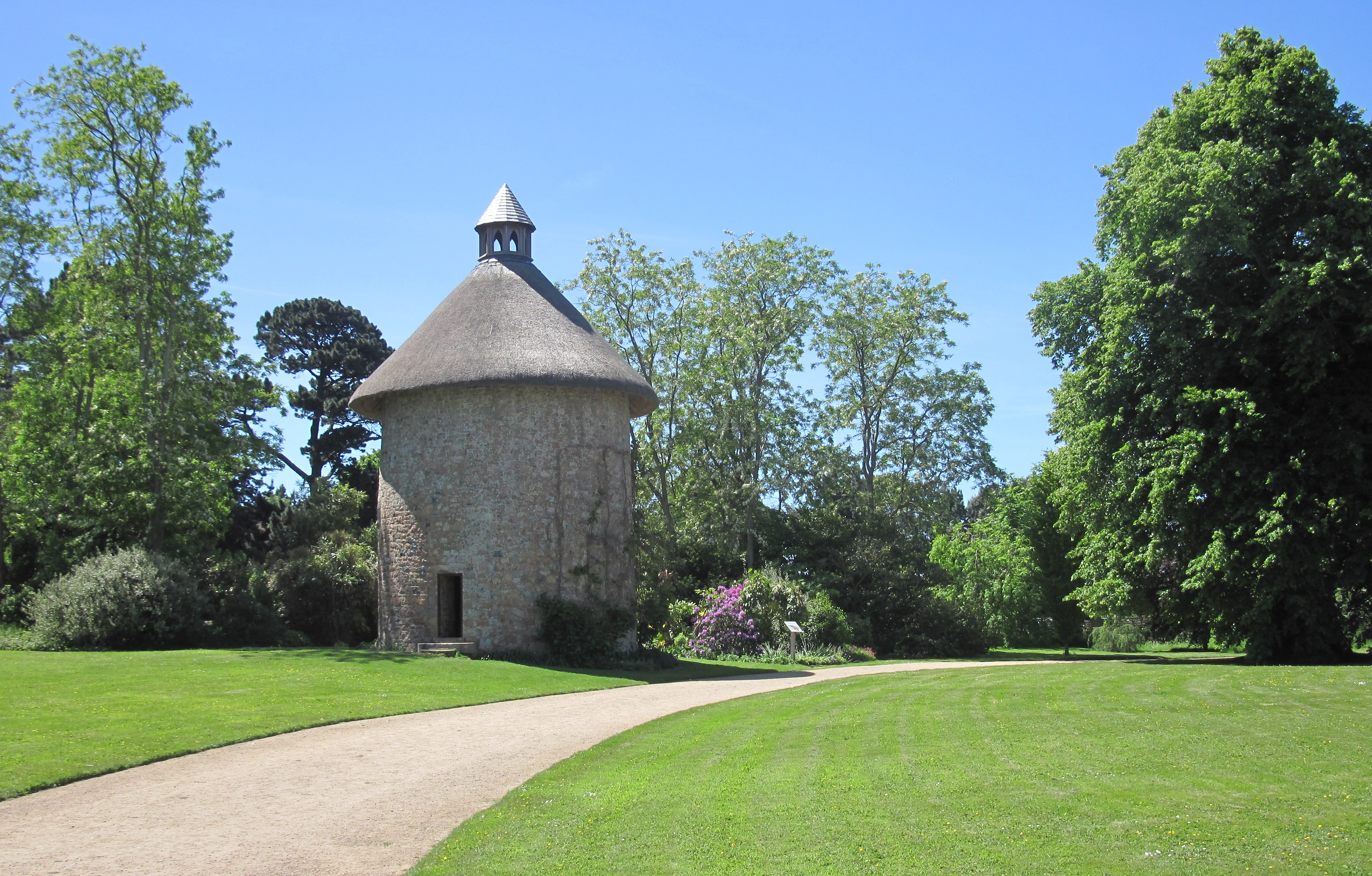
The colombier in 2011.

The oldest part of the house is the undercroft thought to be a crypt dedicated to Saint Martha, dating from the 11th or 12th century. Today, the west-wing of the manor house is above the undercroft. The original building, possibly a chapel, which once stood above the crypt is no longer present.

The manor house is a H-plan building with a number of Tudor arched windows on the ground floor.

The round colombier is believed to be the oldest in Jersey and may date to as early as the 12th century.

The present gardens were first created in the 1920s by Sir James Knott who bought the manor in 1924. This substantial work included re-claiming the salt marsh area near the manor.

On the 12 June 2009, the manor's grounds were used by the BBC as a location for filming an episode of Antiques Roadshow.

== Farm ==
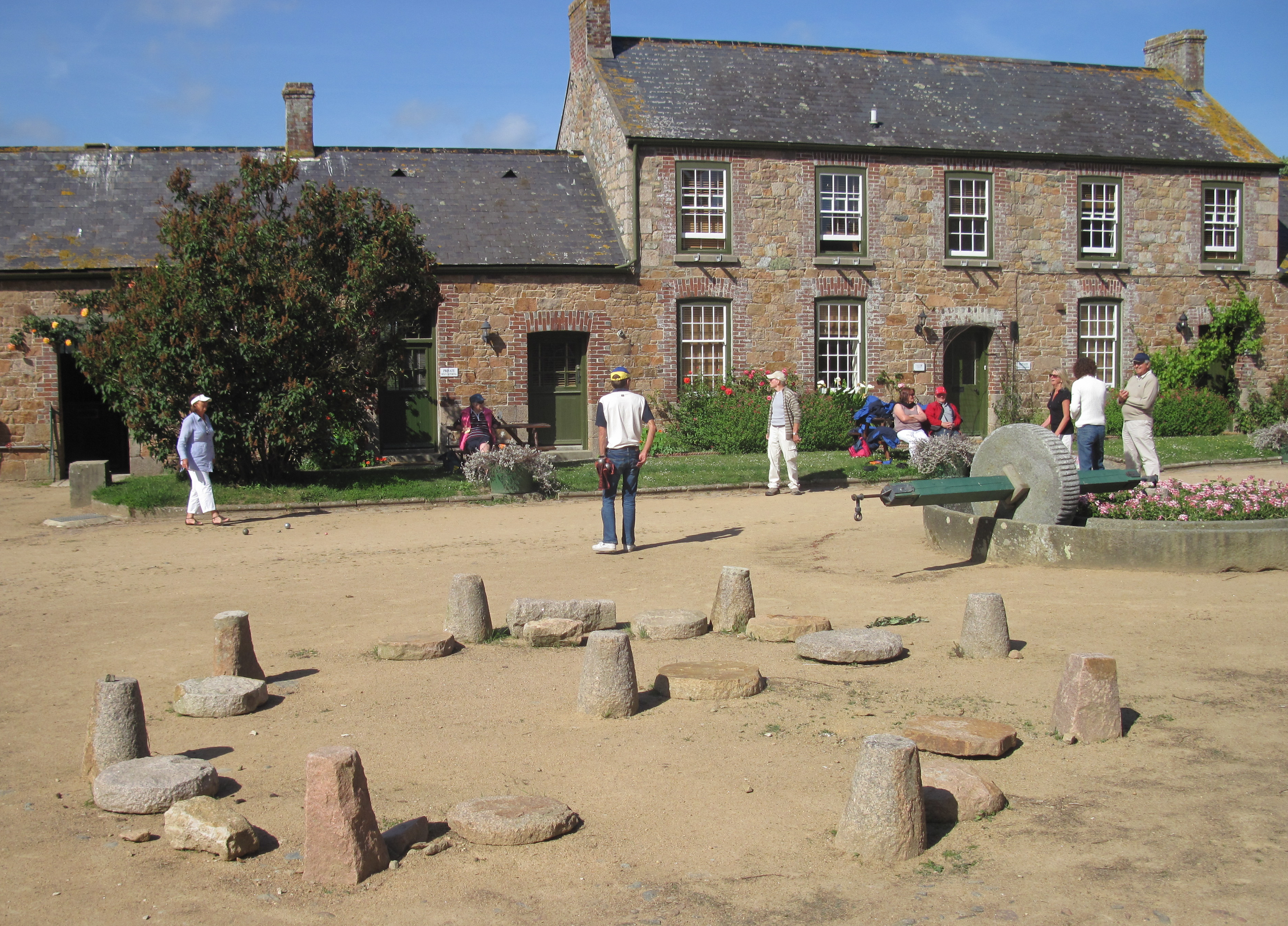
Farm yard and buildings

Samarès Manor farm lies directly to east of the manor house. Many of the buildings are now used as self-catering accommodation.

== See also ==
- Saint Ouen's Manor
