= James Dumaresq =

Jersey merchants

James Dumaresq (c. 1792–1841) was a merchant and fisherman who was the first known resident of L'Anse au Cotard near L'Anse-au-Clair, in Newfoundland and Labrador, Canada. Dumaresq was the first of many Jersey fisherman and merchants to travel to the region now known as the Jersey Trail.

== Early life ==
James Dumaresq was born in Jersey to Philip Dumaresq and Elizbeth Piton in about 1792. He was part of the patrician Dumaresq family of Jersey, and a descendant of Elias Dumaresq, 3rd Seigneur of Augrès through his paternal grandfather Captain William Dumaresq.

== L'Anse au Cotard ==
James Dumaresq landed in L'Anse au Cotard around 1810, where he would build his home. In 2004 archaeological research was done in the region and the home of James Dumaresq was discovered.
