= Seigneur of Augrès =

Noble title in Jersey

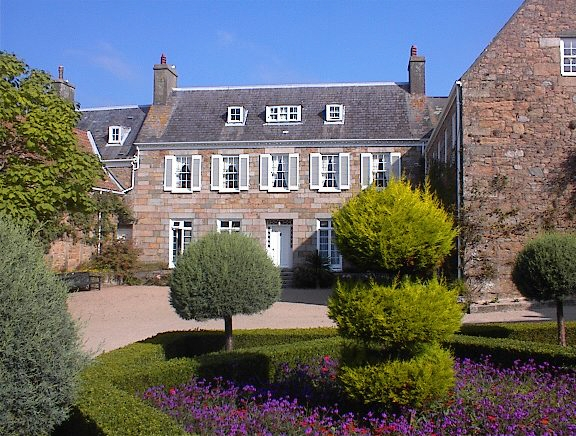
Les Augrès Manor

The Seigneur of Augrès is a noble title in Jersey, which still follows the Norman system. They traditionally lived in Les Augrès Manor, which was actually in the fief of Diélament and not Augrès.

== Larbalestier Seigneurs of Augrès ==
The Larbalestier family held the fief during the 15th century.

- Anthony Larbalestier, 1st Seigneur of Augrès
- Collette Larbalestier, Lady of Augrès

== Dumaresq Seigneurs of Augrès ==
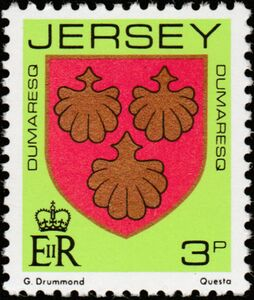

The Dumaresq family inherited the fief from Collette Larbalestier's marriage to Richard Dumaresq, who was the heiress of her father, Anthony Larbalestier.

- Abraham Dumaresq, 2nd Seigneur of Augrès (1571-1631)
  - Second son of John Dumaresq, Seigneur of Vincheles de Bas and of Gorge (son of Collette Larbalestier's marriage to Richard Dumaresq). Married Susan de Carteret daughter of Philippe de Carteret I.
- Elias Dumaresq, 3rd Seigneur of Augrès (c.1620-1677)
  - Son of the 2nd Seigneur and Susan de Carteret, he married Jane Payn daughter of Rev. Thomas Payn.
  - Jurat of the Royal Court in 1645.
  - Received an official grant for the fief of Augrès from King Charles II.
- Elias Dumaresq, 4th Seigneur of Augrès (1648-1731)
  - Son of 3rd Seigneur and his wife Jane, he married Frances De Carteret daughter of Francis De Carteret (son of Philippe de Carteret II).
- Elias Dumaresq, 5th Seigneur of Augrès (1674-1754)
  - Son of 4th Seigneur and Francis De Carteret, he married Elizabeth De Carteret.
  - Jurat of the Royal Court.
  - Colonel of the Royal Jersey Militia.
  - After death Les Augrès Manor was separated from the fief and was sold to Nicolas Messervy.
