= Les Augrès Manor =

Manor house

Coordinates: 49.2288°N 2.0746°W

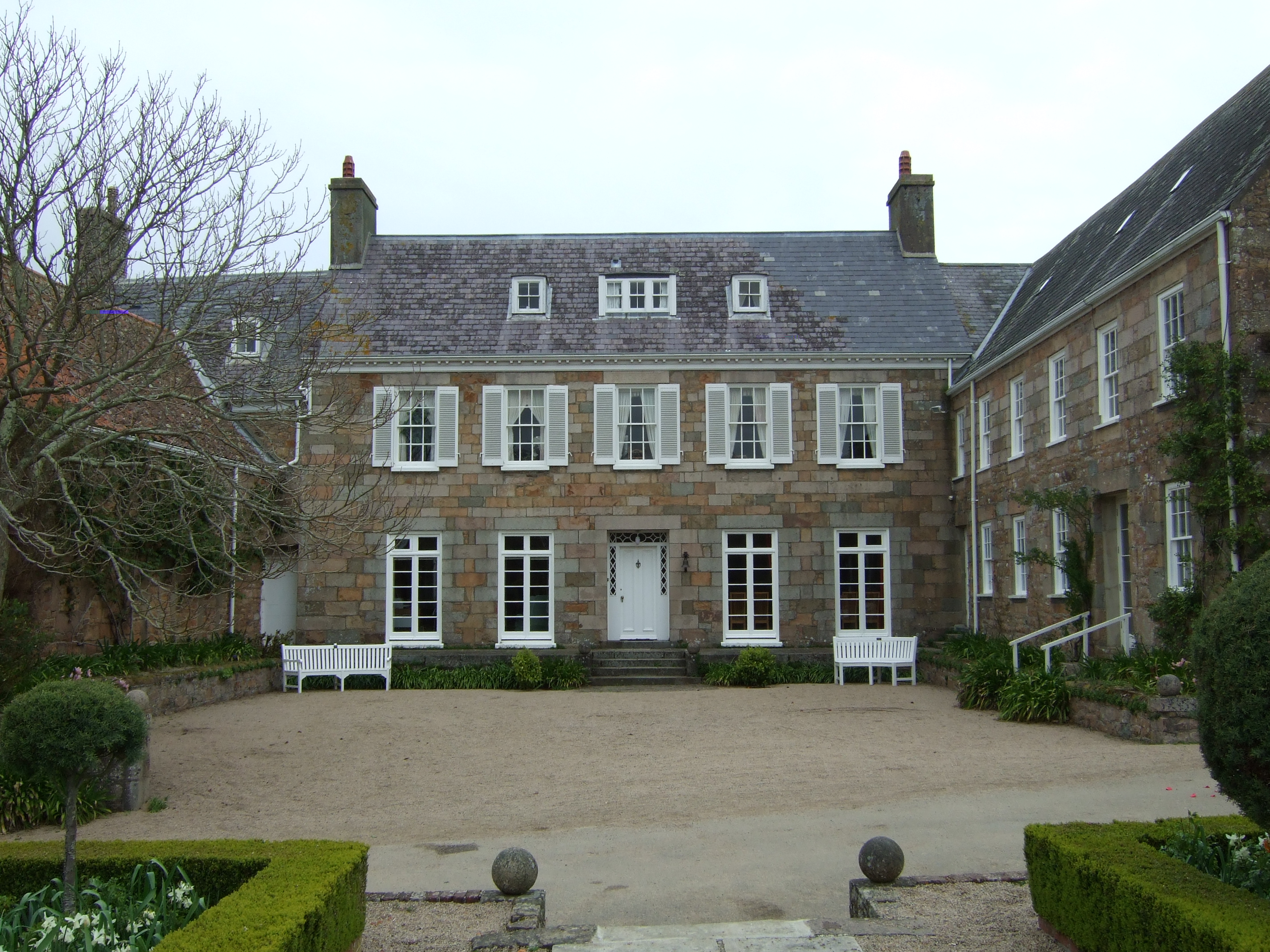
The Manor House from the gardens in 2009

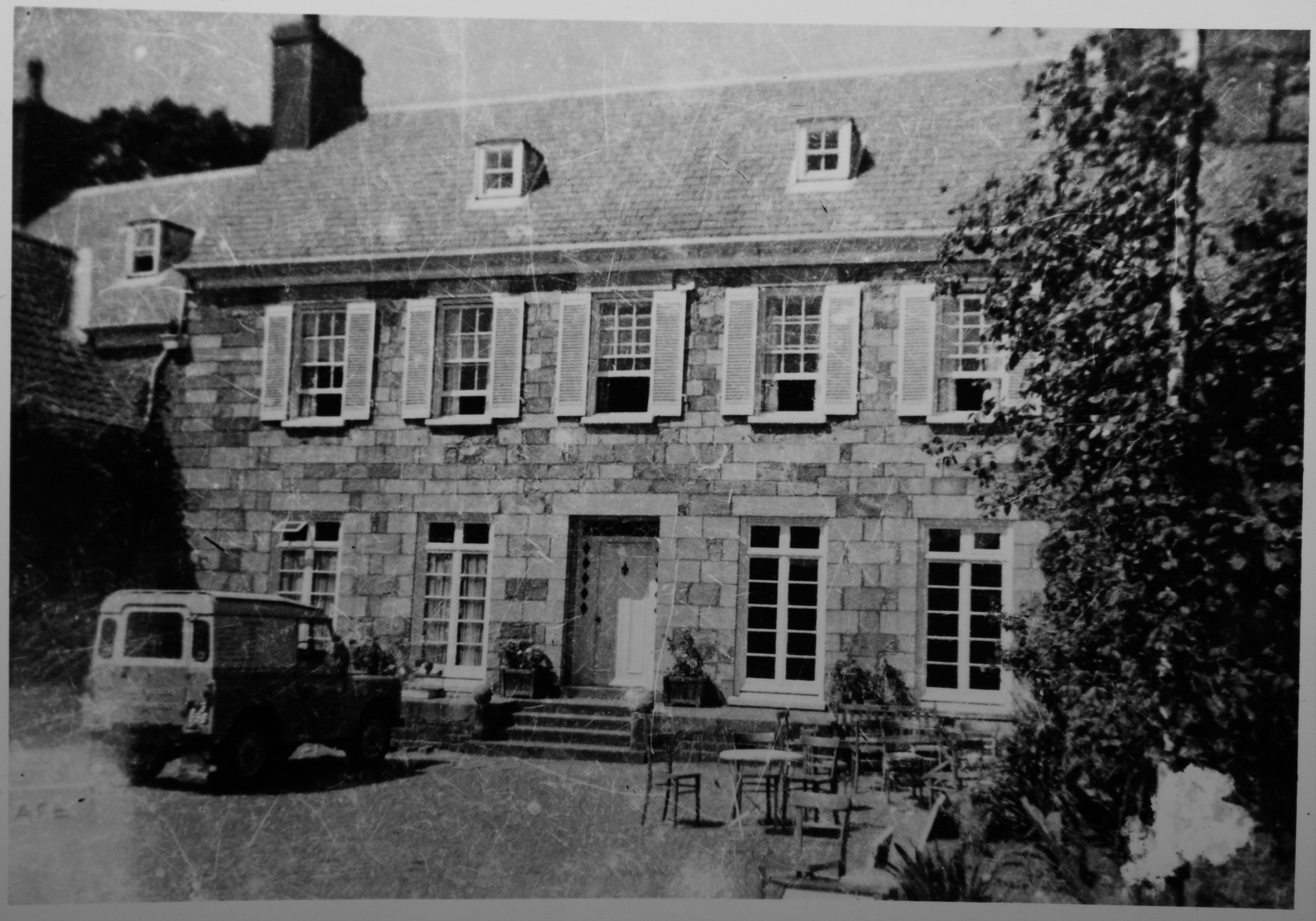
The Manor House in 1963

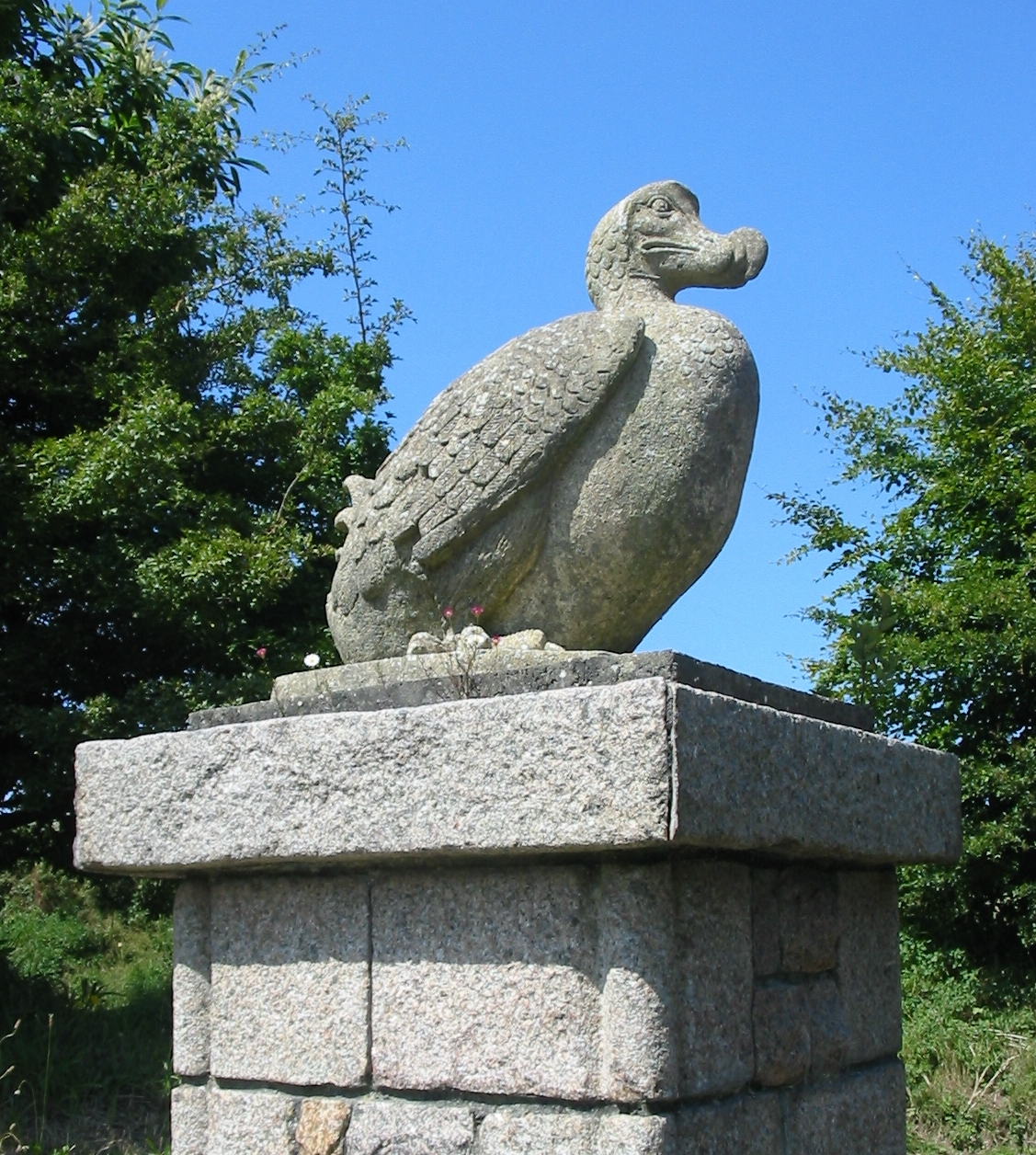
Statues of dodos top the entrance to the manor

Les Augrès Manor is a manor house on La Profonde Rue in the Vingtaine de Rozel in the parish of Trinity in Jersey. The present building mostly dates from the 19th century, although the site has medieval origins. It is a listed building.

The old manor is in the fief of Augrès, but stands on the fief of Diélament. The granite walls and arches date back to the 16th century, but the house was rebuilt in 1771.

The manor house is depicted on the 2010 issue Jersey 5 pound note.

== Datestones in the manor ==
The manor contains numerous datestones, the oldest identifiable ones of which state

- "EDM. FSDC 1682.", located above a fireplace, placed when a son Elie was born to the couple Elie Dumaresq and Francoise de Carteret (married 1680) occupying the manor in 1682.
- "EDM.EDC.1732." One of the two stones placed by the couple Elie Dumaresq fils Elie and Elizabeth de Carteret fille Jean, who married in 1703 or 1704.
- "EDM. EDC.1741." The second of the two stones placed by the couple.

== Previous occupants ==
Les Augrès Manor was the seat of the Seigneur of Augrès, which included notable people from the Dumaresq family. In 1649 during the interregnum, the recently proclaimed "King" Charles II visited Royalist, Elias Dumaresq at Augrès Manor with Philippe de Carteret and George de Carteret, giving him a new grant to the title. The manor was separated from the title following the death and bankruptcy of Elias Dumaresq, 5th Seigneur of Augres.

== Durrell headquarters ==
The manor house has been used as the headquarters of the Durrell Wildlife Conservation Trust (formerly Jersey Wildlife Preservation Trust) since 1963. It was also the personal residence of naturalist Gerald Durrell during this time until his death in 1995, and remains so for his widow Lee Durrell. It has been prominently featured in several of Gerald Durrell's works, including Menagerie Manor, which takes its title from the house. The manor house was bought outright by the Trust from its previous owner in 1971.

Since 1958, the grounds of the manor have been developed as a zoological park, originally named Jersey Zoo, and presently named Durrell Wildlife Park.
