= Yeovilton =

Village in Somerset, England

Coordinates: 51.0037°N 2.6488°W

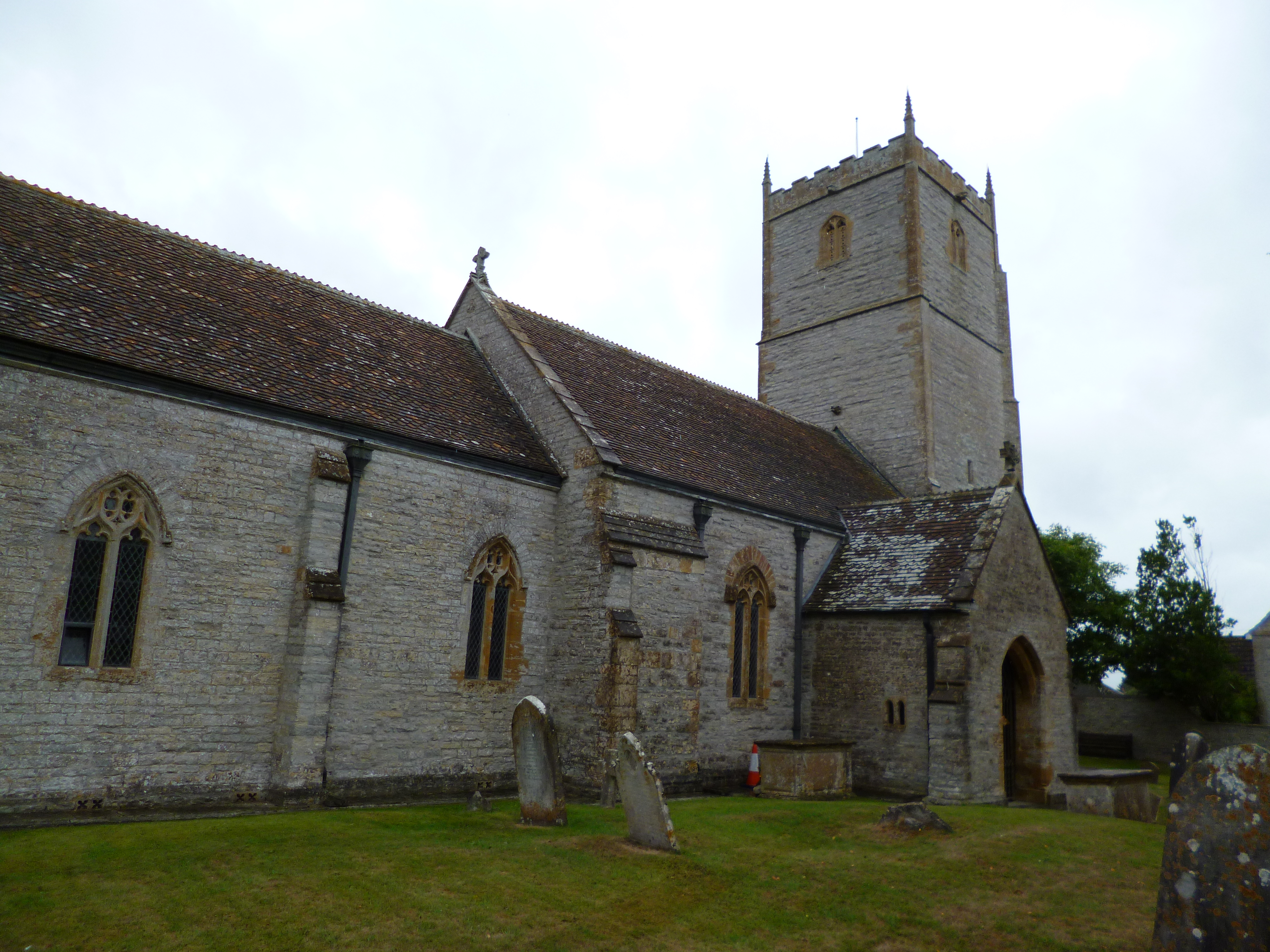
- St Bartholomew's Church

- Location within Somerset
- Population: 1,226 (2011)
- OS grid reference: ST545229
- Civil parish: Yeovilton and District
- Unitary authority: Somerset Council
- Ceremonial county: Somerset
- Region: South West
- Country: England
- Sovereign state: United Kingdom
- Post town: Yeovil
- Postcode district: BA22
- Dialling code: 01935
- Police: Avon and Somerset
- Fire: Devon and Somerset
- Ambulance: South Western
- UK Parliament: Glastonbury and Somerton

Yeovilton /ˈjoʊvɪltən/ is a village in Somerset, England, 1 mile (1.6 km) east of Ilchester and 5 miles (8.0 km) north of Yeovil. It had a population of 1,226 in the 2011 census, estimated at 1,418 in 2019.

The village is part of Yeovilton and District civil parish, which includes Limington, Podimore (also known as Puddimore or Milton Podimore) and the hamlets of Speckington and Bridgehampton. The village includes RNAS Yeovilton (HMS Heron) and the associated Fleet Air Arm Museum.

== History ==
Yeovilton is close to the route of the Fosse Way, a Roman road that linked Exeter (Isca Dumnoniorum) in South West England to Lincoln (Lindum Colonia) in the East Midlands, via Ilchester (Lindinis), Bath (Aquae Sulis), Cirencester (Corinium), Leicester (Ratae Corieltauvorum) and Newark-on-Trent. There is evidence of a Romano-British farmstead under what is now an airfield.

Between 899 and 925, an estate in Yeovilton was granted by King Edward and between 955 and 959 King Eadwig gave a further holding of five hides to Brihtric. The parish of Yeovilton was part of the hundred of Somerton, while Podimore was part of the Whitley Hundred.

In 1411 the lord of the manor was John Rogers, who also held the manor of Barwick. By 1602, these had been inherited by Henry Lyte. The holding was purchased by G. D. W. Digby of Sherborne Castle in Dorset in 1857 and remained with the Digby family until 1919.

In 1939, the village was chosen as the site for the RNAS Yeovilton air base, which was used for engagements during World War II. The associated Fleet Air Arm Museum, was opened on the site of the airfield in 1964. Since 1993 the Fleet Air Arm’s Memorial Church has been the Church of St Bartholomew in Yeovilton. The village was host to a stage start of the Tour of Britain in 2007.

== Governance ==
Yeovilton is in Yeovilton and District civil parish, formed in 2022 when Yeovilton parish was merged with Limington parish. A parish council has responsibility for some local issues.

For local government purposes, the parish is in Somerset unitary district. For elections to Somerset Council, it is in Castle Cary electoral division, which elects two councillors. Historically, it was it was part of Yeovil Rural District from 1894 to 1974, and then South Somerset district from 1974 until Somerset became unitary in 2023.

The village is part of the Glastonbury and Somerton constituency for elections to the House of Commons of the Parliament of the United Kingdom.

== Geography and climate ==
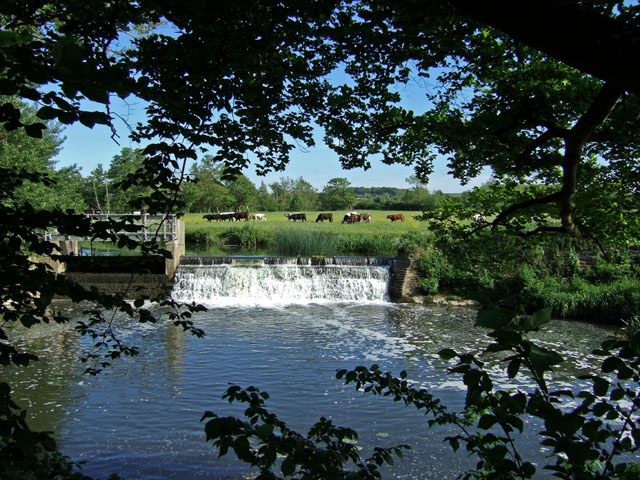
Weir on the river Yeo at Yeovilton

The town lies on the north bank of the river Yeo, from which it gets its name, opposite Limington.

The parish is largely flat, lying mostly between 50 feet (15.2 m) and 75 feet (22.9 m) above sea level, on the alluvium of the Yeo and Cam valleys and partly on clay loam on the Lower Lias.

Average maximum and minimum temperatures, average rainfall, rain days and sunshine recorded in 1991–2020 at the Yeovilton Met Office weather station:

Climate data for Yeovilton (1991–2020 normals, extremes 1964-present)
Month	Jan	Feb	Mar	Apr	May	Jun	Jul	Aug	Sep	Oct	Nov	Dec	Year
Record high °C (°F)	16.1 (61.0)	17.7 (63.9)	21.3 (70.3)	25.4 (77.7)	32.9 (91.2)	37.3 (99.1)	35.0 (95.0)	35.5 (95.9)	29.9 (85.8)	26.5 (79.7)	18.5 (65.3)	16.0 (60.8)	37.3 (99.1)
Mean daily maximum °C (°F)	8.6 (47.5)	9.0 (48.2)	11.2 (52.2)	13.9 (57.0)	17.1 (62.8)	19.9 (67.8)	21.9 (71.4)	21.6 (70.9)	19.2 (66.6)	15.3 (59.5)	11.5 (52.7)	9.0 (48.2)	14.9 (58.8)
Daily mean °C (°F)	5.3 (41.5)	5.4 (41.7)	7.1 (44.8)	9.2 (48.6)	12.3 (54.1)	15.1 (59.2)	17.1 (62.8)	16.9 (62.4)	14.6 (58.3)	11.5 (52.7)	8.0 (46.4)	5.7 (42.3)	10.7 (51.3)
Mean daily minimum °C (°F)	2.0 (35.6)	1.8 (35.2)	3.0 (37.4)	4.5 (40.1)	7.4 (45.3)	10.3 (50.5)	12.2 (54.0)	12.2 (54.0)	10.0 (50.0)	7.6 (45.7)	4.4 (39.9)	2.3 (36.1)	6.5 (43.7)
Record low °C (°F)	−16.1 (3.0)	−12.2 (10.0)	−10.0 (14.0)	−6.4 (20.5)	−4.1 (24.6)	0.0 (32.0)	4.4 (39.9)	2.9 (37.2)	−1.8 (28.8)	−4.8 (23.4)	−8.0 (17.6)	−14.2 (6.4)	−16.1 (3.0)
Average precipitation mm (inches)	70.0 (2.76)	50.9 (2.00)	48.5 (1.91)	51.5 (2.03)	47.2 (1.86)	57.1 (2.25)	50.2 (1.98)	60.7 (2.39)	53.3 (2.10)	80.9 (3.19)	81.9 (3.22)	77.4 (3.05)	729.5 (28.72)
Average precipitation days (≥ 1.0 mm)	12.2	10.4	10.0	10.0	9.2	8.7	8.3	9.8	9.1	12.0	13.2	12.9	125.8
Mean monthly sunshine hours	59.5	79.5	121.6	170.5	202.2	199.8	205.3	185.5	149.2	107.6	71.6	53.5	1,605.7
Source 1: Met Office
Source 2: Starlings Roost Weather

== Transport ==
The village lies south of the A303 trunk road, which connects Basingstoke in Hampshire with Honiton in Devon.

Yeovilton has a two-hourly service in each direction between Taunton and Yeovil, operated by The Buses of Somerset. A coach service on the Taunton–London route, provided by Berry's Coaches, stops in the village twice a day in each direction.

The nearest railway station is Yeovil Junction, which is 9 miles (14 km) away. South Western Railway provides generally hourly services between London Waterloo and Exeter St Davids.

== Religious sites ==
At Podimore the Church of Saint Peter dates from the 14th century and has been designated by English Heritage as a grade I listed building.

The Church of St Bartholomew in Yeovilton dates from around 1300 century and is a grade II* listed building. From 1642 Richard Sterne held the rectory of Yeovilton before going on to become Archbishop of York. The rector between 1762 and 1805 was Daniel Dumaresq after his period as an educational consultant to Russian and Polish monarchs. Since 1993 the church has been owned by the Royal Navy, and it serves as the Memorial chapel for the Fleet Air Arm.

== Notable people ==
- Robert Potter (1721–1804), a cleric born in Podimore, was the first to translate the works of Aeschylus into English.
