= Elias Dumaresq, 3rd Seigneur of Augrès =

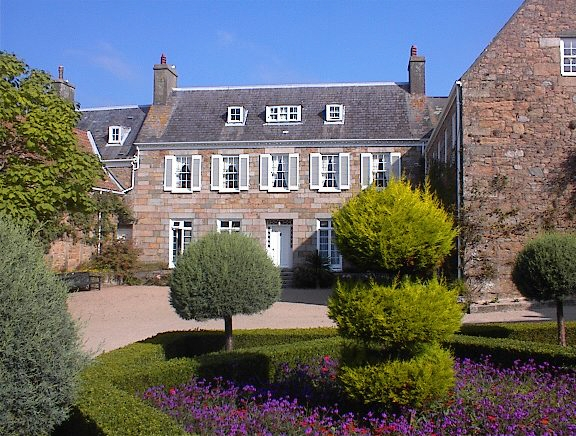
Les Augrès Manor

Elias Dumaresq, 3rd Seigneur of Augrès (c. 1620-1677) was born to Abraham Dumaresq, 2nd Seigneur of Augrès and Susan de Carteret daughter of Philippe de Carteret I, 2nd Seigneur of Sark and his wife Racheal Paulet. He was a Royalist and a Jurat of the Royal Court.

== Civil War ==
Elias was a staunch Royalist during the English Civil War along with his cousins George Carteret and Phillip de Carteret, and remained loyal to the crown during the Interregnum. For his loyalty the proclaimed King Charles II visited him at Les Augrès Manor in 1649 and gave Elias a Grant to the fief of Augrès, and was then held by Knight's Service.

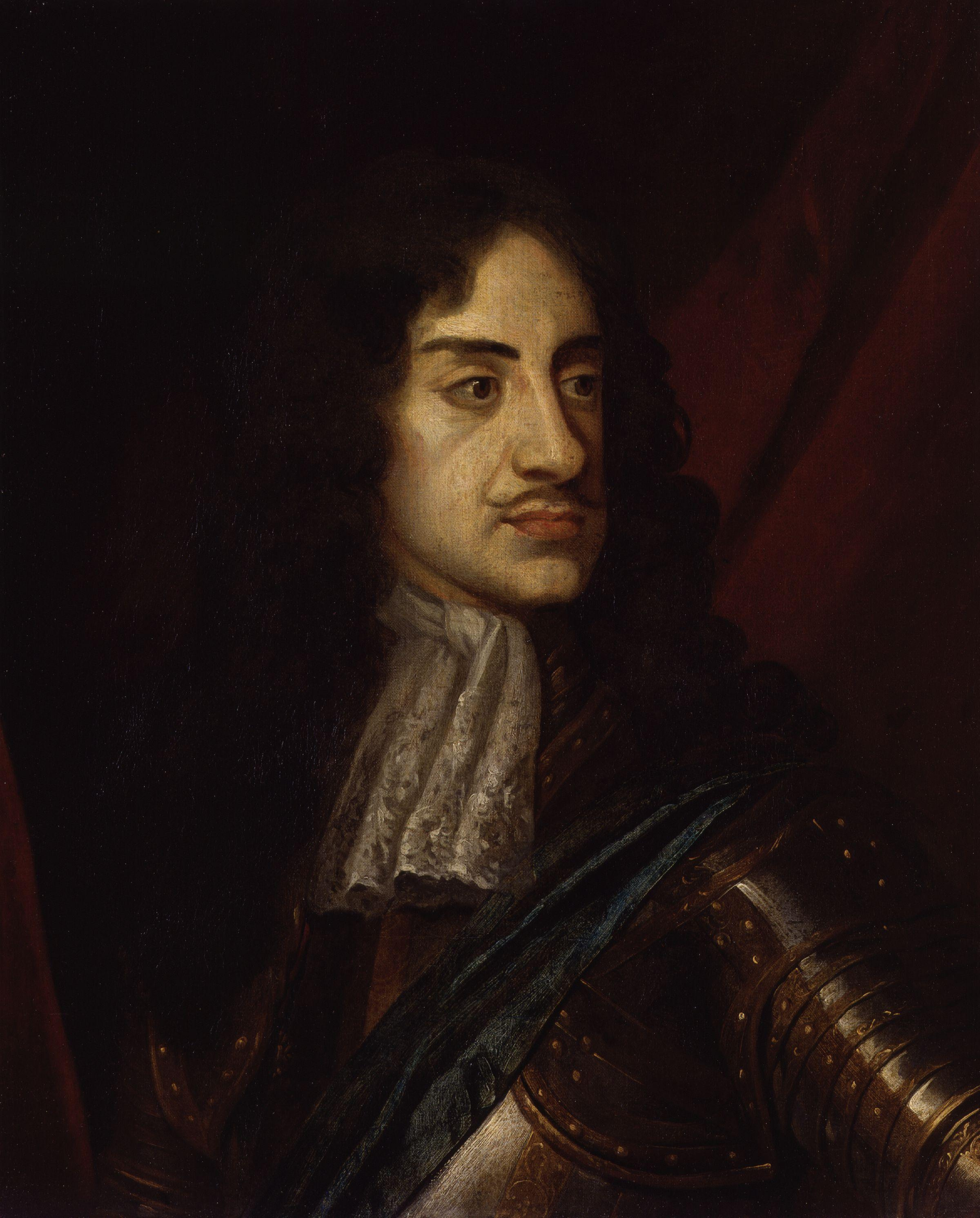
King Charles II

== Family ==
Elias married Jane Payn the daughter of Rev. Thomas Payn, Rector of St. Laurence. They had the following Issue:

- Elias Dumaresq 4th Seigneur of Augrès (1648-1731), married Frances De Carteret daughter of Francis De Carteret.
  - Elias Dumaresq 5th Seigneur of Augrès (1674-1754), married Elizabeth De Carteret
    - Rev Daniel Dumaresq, FRS
    - John Dumaresq
  - Philip Dumaresq
  - Captain John Dumaresq
  - Anne Dumaresq
- Philip Dumaresq, married Sarah Le Gros
- Lieutenant Edward Dumaresq, RN
- John Dumaresq Greffier of the Royal Court, married Ann Bokenham, niece of Captain William Bokenham
  - Captain William Dumaresq (1720-1813)
    - William Dumaresq, married Charlotte Dumaresq
    - Thomas Dumaresq
    - Philippe Dumaresq, married Elizabeth Piton (father of James Dumaresq)
  - Admiral Thomas Dumaresq (1729–1802)
    - Charlotte Dumaresq, married William Dumaresq
  - Ann Dumaresq, married Lieutenant Burton
- Anne Dumaresq (1653-), married John Durell, Lieutenant Bailiff of Jersey:
  - Captain Thomas Durrell (1685-1741)
  - Ann Durell, married Colonel Matthew de Sausmarez
    - Captain Philip Saumarez
    - Matthew Saumarez (father of Admiral James Saumarez, 1st Baron de Saumarez, and General Sir Thomas Saumarez)
  - John Durrell, married Elizabeth Corbet
    - Vice-Admiral Philip Durell (1707 – 1766)
    - Captain George Charles Durrell (1713-1754)
    - Captain Thomas Durrell
- Benjamin Dumaresq (1655-)
- Elizabeth Dumaresq (1669-), married Lieutenant-Colonel Matthew Le Geyt

== Ancestry ==
Ancestry:

Ancestors of Elias Dumaresq, 3rd Seigneur of Augrès

16. Jean Dumaresq, Seigneur of Samares and Vinchelez de Bas
8. Richard Dumaresq, Seigneur of Vincheles and of St. Gorge
17. Mabel Payn
4. John Dumaresq, Seigneur of Vincheles de Bas
18. Anthony Larbalestier, Seigneur des Augrés
9. Collette Larbalestier, Lady des Augrés
2. Abraham Dumaresq, Seigneur of Augres
20. Jean Dumaresq, Seigneur of Samarès
10. Clement Dumaresq, Seigneur of Samares
21. Jane Lempriere
5. Collette Dumaresq
22. Helier de Carteret, Baillif of Jersey
11. Margaret de Carteret
23. Margaret Payn
1. Elias Dumaresq, 3rd Seigneur of Augrès
24. Edward de Carteret, Seigneur of Saint Ouen
12. Helier de Carteret, 1st Seigneur of Sark
25. Marie Sarre
6. Philippe de Carteret I, 2nd Seigneur of Sark
26. Helier de Carteret, Baillif of Jersey
13. Margaret de Carteret
27. Margaret Payn
3. Susan De Carteret
28. Sir Hugh Paulet, Governor of Jersey
14. George Paulet
29. Philippa Pollard
7. Racheal Paulet
30. Edmund Perrin
15. Elizabeth Perrin
31. Jane Holland-Carew
