= The Monitor (Sydney) =

Australian newspaper

- Nothing extenuate nor set down aught in malice
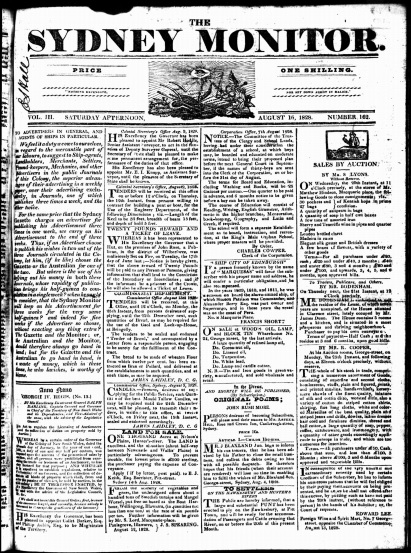
- The front cover of an issue in 1828
- Type: Weekly newspaper
- Founders: Edward Smith Hall; Arthur Hill
- Editor-in-chief: Edward Smith Hall
- Founded: 19 May 1826
- City: Sydney
- Country: Australia

The Monitor was a biweekly English language newspaper published in Sydney, New South Wales and founded in 1826. It is one of the earlier newspapers in the colony commencing publication twenty three years after the Sydney Gazette, the first paper to appear in 1803, and more than seventy years before the federation of Australia. The Monitor changed name several times, subsequently being known as The Sydney Monitor, and in June 1838 Francis O'Brien and Edwyn Henry Statham introduced themselves as the new editors of the re-branded Sydney Monitor and Commercial Advertiser.

== History ==
The newspaper was first published on 19 May 1826 by Edward Smith Hall and Arthur Hill. It appeared once a week, was eight pages long and cost one shilling. The paper was not without controversy in the colony, publicly taking up the cause of the poor and convicts with a motto that "nothing extenuate nor set down aught in malice" and was sometimes openly critical of the governing authorities.

Hall was proud of the high moral tone of the newspaper.

The Monitor is a Journal which the young people of this Colony of either sex may peruse without contamination. No impure images;- no prophane [sic] sentences make their way into our columns; no crim-cons are copied from the English papers; and the police reports and trials are revised before they find insertion. The flowers of the English journals are selected for the instruction and amusement of our Colonists both old and young, and private slander and malignity are carefully excluded.

=== Name changes ===
Masthead	Dates of circulation
The Monitor	1826–1828
The Sydney Monitor	1828–1838
Sydney Monitor and Commercial Advertiser	1838–1841

== Digitisation ==
The various versions of the paper have been digitised as part of the Australian Newspapers Digitisation Program project hosted by the National Library of Australia.

== See also ==
- List of newspapers in Australia
- List of newspapers in New South Wales
