= Ralph Darling =

British Army officer and colonial administrator (1772–1858)

General Sir Ralph Darling GCH
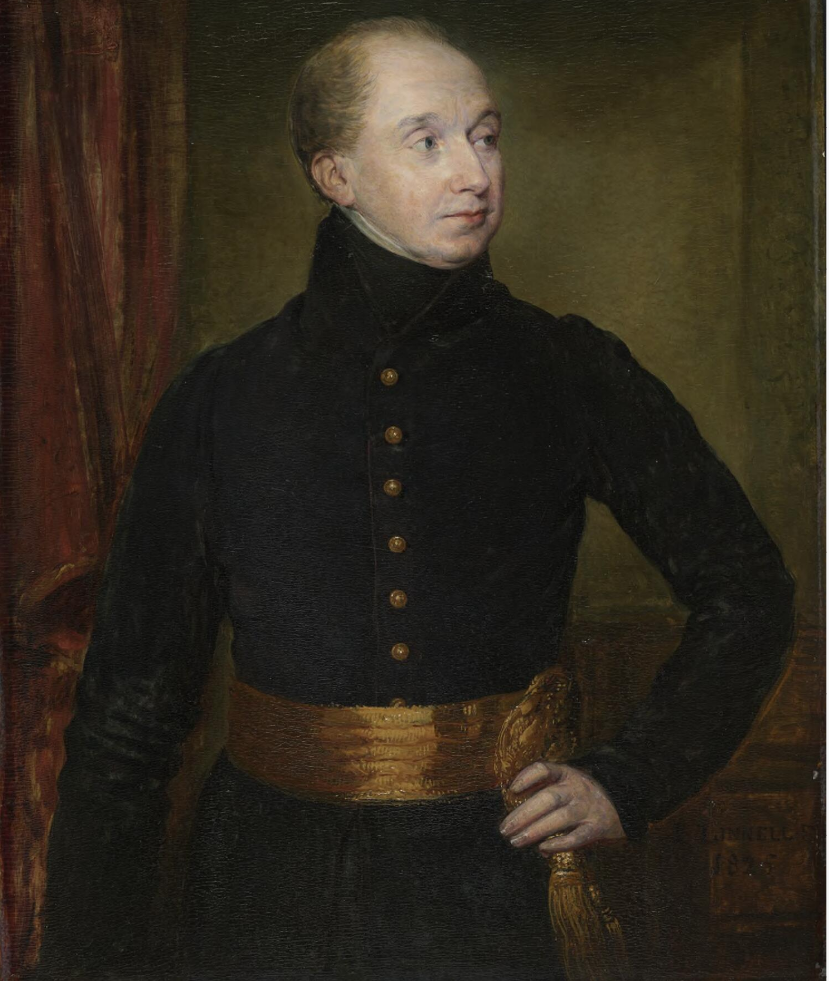

7th Governor of New South Wales
- In office 19 December 1825 – 21 October 1831
- Monarchs: George IV; William IV
- Preceded by: Thomas Brisbane
- Succeeded by: Richard Bourke

Personal details
- Born: 1772 Ireland
- Died: 2 April 1858 (aged 85–86) Brighton, England

Military service
- Allegiance: British Empire
- Branch/service: British Army
- Rank: General
- Commands: British garrison on Mauritius; 51st (2nd Yorkshire West Riding) Regiment of Foot
- Battles/wars: Fédon's rebellion Battle of Corunna; Walcheren Campaign
- Awards: Knight Bachelor; Knight Grand Cross of the Royal Guelphic Order

General Sir Ralph Darling (1772 – 2 April 1858) was a British Army officer and colonial administrator who served as Governor of New South Wales from 1825 to 1831. His period of governorship was unpopular, with Darling being broadly regarded as a tyrant. He introduced austere policies that resulted in croneyism, prisoner abuse, curtailment of press freedoms, discrimination against emancipists, obstruction of representative government, theatrical entertainment bans and injustices toward Indigenous Australians. During his time as Governor, a significant area of eastern Australia was explored by the British with local geographical features being named after him including the Darling River and the Darling Downs, along with Darling Harbour in Sydney.

== Early life ==
Born in Ireland around 1772, Ralph Darling was the eldest son of Christopher Darling, an English sergeant, and later military adjutant, in the 45th Regiment of Foot of the British Army. While his father was away on service during the American Revolutionary War, it is likely that Ralph spent his childhood in either England or Ireland with his mother and siblings.

In 1785, the 45th Regiment was transferred to the Caribbean island of Grenada where Christopher Darling became the regiment's quartermaster. He took his family, including Ralph aged 13, with him.

== Military career ==
=== Grenada ===
In 1786, Ralph Darling, at the age of 14, entered the army as a private in his father's regiment, and served for two years on garrison duty at Grenada. From 1788 until 1792 it appears he became a customs officer on the island and achieved a high level of education and familiarity with colonial administration.

With the outbreak of war against France in 1793, Ralph was granted an officer's commission as an ensign in the British Army on 15 May 1793, without having to make the usual payment. He remained at Grenada and was concurrently promoted to Acting Comptroller of Customs at Saint George's, Grenada.

==== Fédon's rebellion ====
In 1795, a rebellion against British rule led by Julien Fédon, a Black French commander from Martinique, broke out in Grenada. Predominantly led by Francophone free people of color, the rebels aimed to create a Black republic as had already occurred in neighbouring Saint-Domingue. Darling was promoted to the rank of lieutenant in the 15th Regiment of Foot and fought against Fédon's rebels. He survived the high levels of soldier mortality to diseases such as yellow fever, which claimed the life of his father who was still serving in the Caribbean during the rebellion.

=== Military secretary and lieutenant-colonel ===
In August 1796, Darling's efforts were rewarded and he was appointed as military secretary to Sir Ralph Abercromby, the British commander-in-chief in the West Indies. He was also promoted to the rank of captain in the 27th Regiment and was involved in the invasion of Trinidad in 1797. Darling accumulated wealth from his promotions and the prizes of war attained from military operations, and in 1801 he was able to buy a commission as a lieutenant-colonel in the 69th Regiment.

By the time he returned to Britain in 1802, still aged only twenty-nine, Darling had become a respected officer. He seems to have been unique in the British Army of this period, as he progressed from an enlisted man to become a general officer, later obtaining a knighthood. Darling was posted to India with the 69th in 1804, but this affected his health poorly and in 1806 he was shipped back to England where he was appointed as an administrator in the Adjutant-General's office.

=== Napoleonic Wars ===
During the Napoleonic Wars, Darling was attached to the 51st Regiment of Foot which was sent to Spain in the early stages of the Peninsular War. Darling fought at the Battle of Corunna in 1809, a rear-guard action against advancing French troops. He later served as assistant adjutant general during the Walcheren Expedition, before returning to the headquarters at Royal Horse Guards in London, where he served for almost a decade as head of British Army recruiting. In this role, Darling was subsequently promoted to brevet colonel on 25 July 1810, major general on 4 June 1813, and deputy adjutant general in 1814. He married Elizabeth Dumaresq in 1817. Darling was also able to further the careers of his younger brothers Henry and William, and subsequently his nephew Charles; the three brothers all became generals, and Charles also earned a knighthood.

== Acting Governor of Mauritius ==
In February 1819 Darling took on the position of acting governor of British Mauritius and was placed in command of the British garrison on the island. In this role, Darling again exhibited his administrative ability, but he also became very unpopular, being accused of allowing a frigate to breach quarantine and start an epidemic of cholera which killed over 1,000 people. Darling's administration denied the outbreak was contagious and failed to implement any interventions beyond recommending hot baths and ingesting laudanum. In response to the public outcry, Darling suspended the island's Conseil de Commune and censored the only newspaper operating on Mauritius.

Darling also failed to restrict the slave trade into Mauritius, overturning many of the anti-slavery policies brought in by the previous acting governor Gage John Hall. There were around 55,000 slaves labouring on plantations in Mauritius while Darling was in charge, with some being designated as government slaves working directly for the Darling administration. Chain gangs of female slaves were used by Darling as street sweepers and he also imported hundreds of convicts from Ceylon to work as forced labourers building roads and other government infrastructure. Notwithstanding the criticism from some quarters, it was largely on account of his service in Mauritius that Darling was appointed the seventh Governor of New South Wales in 1824.

== Governor of New South Wales ==
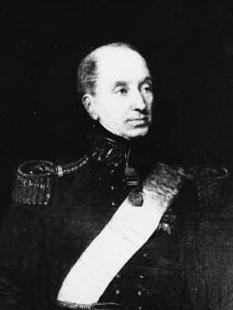
Governor Ralph Darling

Darling arrived in Sydney to take up the role of Governor in December 1825. He came with directions from the High Tory director of the British Colonial Office, Earl Bathurst, to continue the implementation of austere policies to make New South Wales a place of dread for transported convicts. He was also instructed to facilitate the assignment of large tracts of land and convict labourers to exclusive wealthy colonists such as John Macarthur.

Darling, a loyal conservative Tory, enacted these directions thoroughly, as did his friend George Arthur who became the Lieutenant-Governor of the newly separate colony of Van Diemen's Land (later known as Tasmania) before Darling's arrival.

Convicts were subjected to regimes of brutal treatment especially at the secondary penal colonies of Moreton Bay, under the notorious superintendent Patrick Logan, and at Norfolk Island. In Sydney, as he did in Mauritius, Darling established convict road gangs which under harsh conditions, constructed several roads including the Great North Road, linking the Hawkesbury settlements around Sydney with those in the Hunter Valley.

However, Darling sought to ensure the education of child prisoners, improve the treatment of female convicts, and promote the use of Christian teaching as a means of rehabilitation.

=== Nepotism and accusations of tyranny ===
Convicts who had served their terms, known as emancipists, were barred by Darling from holding government positions and were widely discriminated against. As a result, he came into conflict with some liberal "emancipists" who wished to introduce greater political and social freedom in New South Wales. Their accusations of tyrannical misrule were publicised by opposition newspapers in England and Australia (including the Australian, run by William Wentworth and Robert Wardell). Darling accentuated social class differences and even categorised convicts into three separate grades based upon their "delinquency".

Darling was a professional soldier, military governor of what was still effectively a penal colony, and having lived entirely within the authoritarian structure of the army since childhood, he lacked experience in dealing with civilian society. He tended to rely upon like-minded military men for his administration, and it was soon subject to criticism for nepotism, favouritism and tyrannical rule in the colonial newspapers.

Darling's predecessor, Thomas Brisbane, had ended press censorship, creating in effect press freedom before Darling arrived in the colony. Darling's subsequent attempts to control the press through new legislation were not entirely successful, because the Chief Justice, Francis Forbes, advised that some of the measures were not compatible with the laws of England. However, Darling was able to pass some restrictive acts against newspaper editors which resulted in the jailing of one of his most vociferous critics, Edward Smith Hall, who was the editor of The Monitor.

It is certainly the case that Darling made land grants to relatives, including his brothers-in-law Henry and William Dumaresq, and others that he favoured, such as George Bowen and Stewart Ryrie, a brother-in law of Darling's first Lieutenant-Governor, William Stewart. Those same favoured people received appointments within his administration. He employed his nephew, Charles Henry Darling, as an assistant private secretary.

The government advisory bodies of the Legislative Council of New South Wales and the Executive Council were also stacked with close ideological associates of Darling such as Archdeacon Thomas Hobbes Scott and Alexander Macleay. Darling consulted with these councils only irregularly and mostly for issues he regarded as unimportant. This opposition to representative government also extended to the courts where he obstructed or delayed civilian trial by jury reforms, preferring to keep appointed military juries especially for criminal cases.

In regards to public entertainment, Governor Darling "ruthlessly and implacably countered all attempts to establish a theatre in Sydney". He even introduced a law effectively banning the performance of drama. The law stated that no form of public entertainment could take place without approval from the colonial secretary, and Darling ensured that all such applications were rejected. He did permit concerts of music to take place.

Darling's nepotism also extended to those he chose to explore the uncolonised regions of New South Wales. In particular, Captain Charles Sturt, who was related through marriage to Darling's wife, was selected to conduct important expeditions into the interior of the continent over more qualified candidates such as the surveyor Sir Thomas Mitchell. In order to expedite the many land grants Darling made, he actively encouraged the charting and surveying of the colony. In 1826 he defined the Nineteen Counties which were the limits of location in the colony of New South Wales. From 1831 the granting of free land ceased and the only land that was to be made available for sale was within the Nineteen Counties.

=== Treatment of Indigenous Australians ===
During Darling's tenure there was a rapid alienation of large amounts of land into the possession of wealthy colonists. This was especially the case in the Hunter Valley region where the Australian Agricultural Company directed by family contacts of John Macarthur took up a million acre grant. Hundreds of thousands of additional acres were granted out in the same region, in particular to former military officers. Indigenous Australians residing in the region were dispossessed in the process and although some were utilised for labour, many were forcibly removed from their lands or killed.

In 1826, Darling deployed the New South Wales Mounted Police to the Hunter River area to subdue Aboriginal resistance. Lieutenant Nathaniel Lowe of the police led a number of operations characterised by the summary executions of supposed Aboriginal ringleaders. At least two large massacres of Aboriginal Australians were also perpetrated by the mounted police and armed colonists at this time. An investigation exonerated Lowe of any wrongdoing, while Darling himself encouraged and supported the settlers (who were often of a military background) in their "vigorous measures" against the Aboriginal people. Darling also dropped the charges against an officer for the shooting deaths of several Aboriginal people at the Fort Wellington outpost and commuted the sentences of several convicts found guilty of killing an Indigenous boy at Port Stephens.

The annual distribution of blankets to Aboriginal people was initiated by Darling in 1826, originally as rewards to those who assisted in the capture of bushrangers. Darling issued a proclamation in 1831 banning trade in heads out of New Zealand saying that there was reason to believe that the trade tended to increase the sacrifice of human life.

=== The Sudds Thompson scandal ===
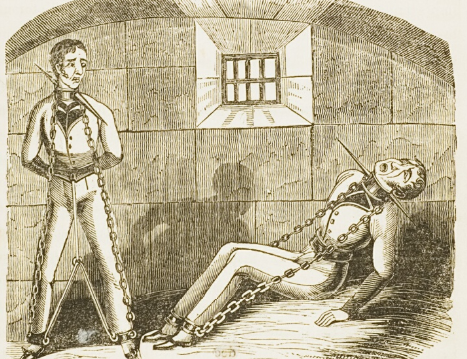
Convicted soldiers, Joseph Sudds and Patrick Thompson, chained with spiked iron collars

In keeping with official policy and the governor's own disciplinarian instincts, Darling's administration certainly strengthened the punitive aspects of transportation. Perhaps the most controversial act of his tenure was the harsh treatment of soldiers Joseph Sudds and Patrick Thompson, who in 1826 had committed theft in the belief that seven years in an outlying penal colony would be an easier life than two decades of army discipline. As an example to others, the Governor personally modified their conviction and had them humiliated in front of their regiment, placed in irons and assigned to a chain gang. Darling also ordered spiked collars to be attached to their necks, which were in use during his time in Mauritius as implements to prevent slaves from being able to rest their heads. Less than a week after the conviction, Joseph Sudds died while undergoing this punishment.

Sudds' death was officially downplayed and it was stated as having been due to a pre-existing illness which the Governor had not been properly informed about. However, the incident proved intensely and persistently controversial at the time and formed a major element in the rising career of Mr William Charles Wentworth as a political thorn in the side of the establishment and a leading advocate for the self-government of the Australian colonies.

Wentworth, who was also famous for crossing the Blue Mountains with Blaxland and Lawson, became the Colony's leading political figure of the 1820s–30s. He called for representative government, the abolition of transportation, freedom of the press and trial by jury. Wentworth became the most bitter enemy of Governor Ralph Darling and his 'exclusives' led by the wealthy grazier John Macarthur.

In one account disfavourable to the Governor written by Marcus Clarke the following claims regarding Governor Darling's "act of tryanny" of 22 November 1826 are made: "it was given forth that Sudds had died from combined dropsy and bronchitis. Mr. Wentworth – a native-born Australian barrister, of some eloquence and intense capacity for hating – would not rest satisfied with this explanation, and little by little the facts of the case leaked out"; "the ingenious Darling had placed round their necks spiked iron collars attached by another set of chains to the ankle fetters. The projecting spikes prevented the unhappy men from lying down at ease, and the connecting chains were short enough to prevent them from standing upright. Under the effects of this treatment Sudds had died. Public fury now knew no bounds. Tradesmen put up their shutters as though in mourning for some national calamity. The fiercest denunciations met the Governor on all sides, and he was accused of wilful murder".

After Sudds' death, Thompson was taken in a bullock-cart to Penrith gaol, and thence conveyed to "No. 1, Iron-chain-gang party" on Lapstone-hill, being at the face of the Blue Mountains. At three o’clock on the first day he was taken out and set to work with the gang, having the spiked collar that had killed Sudds on his neck the whole time. After eight hot days of this work Thompson refused to continue working and was taken to gaol and was finally sent on board the hulks. Thompson was eventually ordered to rejoin his regiment (Sydney Gazette, 28 March 1829), and was sent back to England in October 1829 (Australian, 23 October 1829). When Captain Robert Robison of the NSW Veteran's Corps made a complaint about the cruel treatment of Thompson, Darling had Robison court martialled and removed to England where he was eventually jailed.

=== Resignation ===
Having gathered considerable evidence of his own, Wentworth wrote to Sir George Murray, the Secretary of State, and forwarded to him a long bill of indictment against the Governor. On 8 July 1828, Mr. Stewart, a member of the British House of Commons, rose to move for "papers connected with the case of Joseph Sudds and Patrick Thompson". The "rascally newspapers" had not been idle either, and "Miles", a correspondent of the Morning Chronicle, took up the cudgels for Mr. Wentworth and commented severely on the conduct of the Tory Governor of New South Wales. The Colonial Office eventually acted and decided to replace Darling as governor with Sir Richard Bourke.

Darling, fearful of being impeached and of possible legal proceedings being taken against him, decided to flee New South Wales before the arrival of Bourke, sailing in October 1831. Darling's departure for England, upon the ship Hooghly, was greeted by public feasting and rejoicing, but his modern biographer has described this display as being "orchestrated by his opponents".

The controversy around Darling persisted and lasted years after his resignation – with the Whig party clamouring for vengeance, and with "Miles", persistently chronicling all of Darling’s misdeeds in order to seek that Darling be tried for his life. There was, however, no "trial for murder" and the Government expressed itself fully satisfied with the conduct of Sir Ralph Darling. Wentworth, having got Major-General Sir Richard Bourke (who was generally liked) appointed as the new governor, turned his attention to other pursuits. Wentworth published in England a series of pamphlets containing an account of this whole business.

== Later life ==
Ralph Darling left Australia in 1831, returning to England in 1832. Continuing pressure from political opponents led to the formation of a select committee to examine his actions in Australia, but the inquiry exonerated him, and the day after it concluded, he was knighted by the king in a dramatic display of official favour. The controversy in Australia may have contributed to the fact that he was not given any significant new military or political assignments, but further promotion and various honorific appointments did follow, and he was happy to devote much of his time to raising his young children.

He was given the colonelcy of the 90th Regiment of Foot in 1823, transferring as Colonel to the 41st (Welch) Regiment of Foot in 1837 and to the 69th (South Lincolnshire) Regiment of Foot in 1848, a post he held until his death.

Darling died in Brighton on 2 April 1858 at the age of eighty-six, survived by his widow, three sons and four daughters.

== Family ==
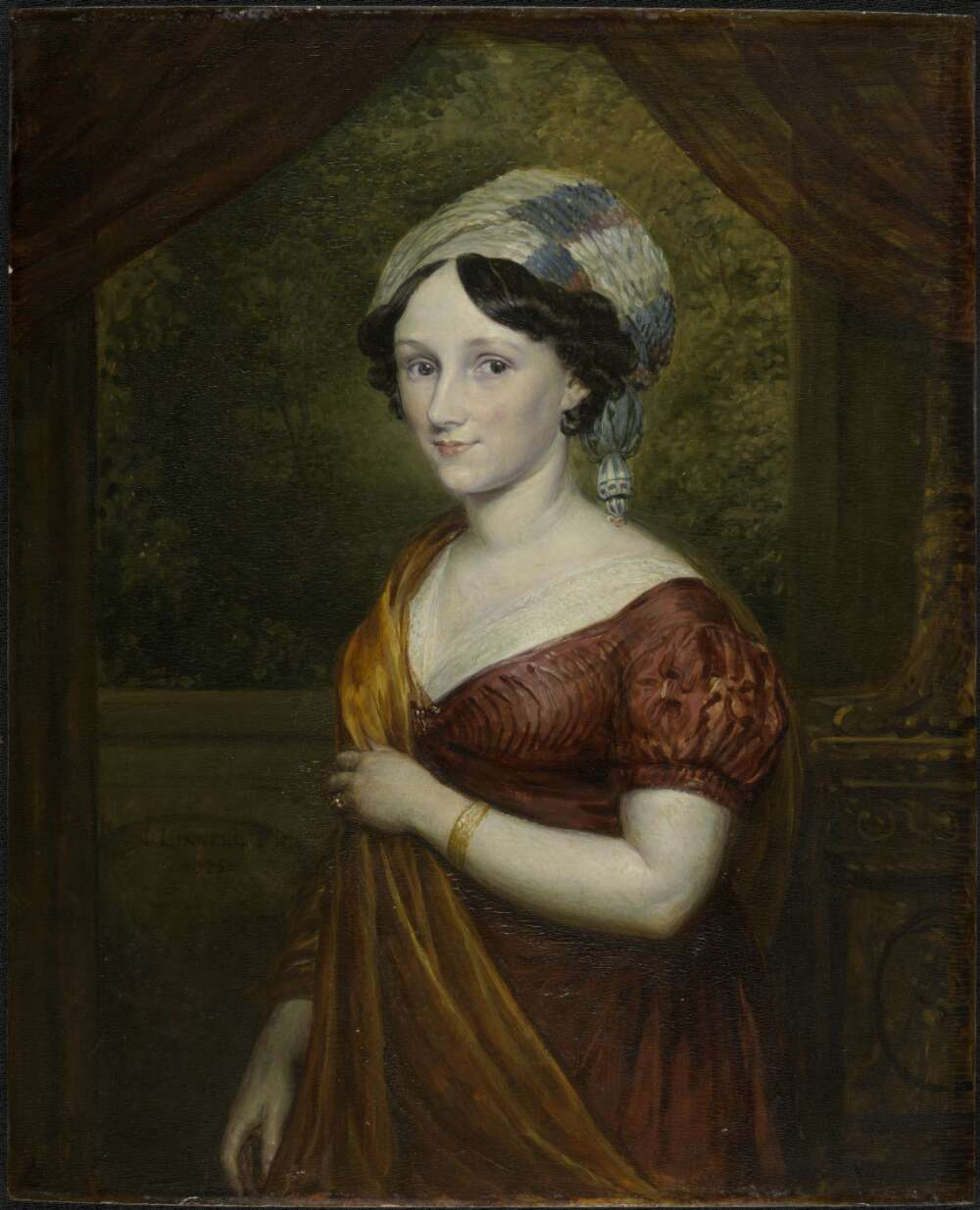
Eliza Darling, 1825 portrait by John Linnell

On 13 October 1817, Darling married the 19-year-old Elizabeth Dumaresq, known as Eliza (1798–1868). She was the daughter of Colonel John Dumaresq, a landowner in Shropshire. The marriage was a happy one. Of ten children, four daughters and three sons survived to adulthood.

Eliza's widowed mother Ann Dumaresq was a devout philanthropist, and lived in Cheltenham. Eliza was influenced by Hannah More and Sarah Trimmer. In Australia, she consulted the penal reformer Elizabeth Fry, with reference in particular to female convicts. She was also involved in the establishment of the Female School of Industry at Parramatta.

After Darling's position in New South Wales ended, the family returned to England. They lived at Cheltenham, then Brighton where Darling died in 1858.

== Named after Ralph Darling ==
The following features are named after Ralph Darling or members of his immediate family:

- Darling River
- Darling Harbour
- Darling Downs
- Darling Scarp, also referred to as the Darling Range or Darling Ranges
- Darling Causeway, a landform in the Blue Mountains
- Darling Street, the main thoroughfare of Balmain
- The Sydney suburbs of Darlinghurst and Darling Point

The Logan River in South-East Queensland was named the Darling River in 1826 by Captain Patrick Logan, in honour of the then-Governor Darling. However, Darling decided to, "[return] the compliment by renaming the river the Logan, to recognise Logan's enthusiasm and efficiency."

== Popular culture ==
Darling appears as a character in the radio play Spoiled Darlings and the mini series The Patriots.

== Sources ==
- Duyker, Edward (June 1985), "An Elegant Defence of a Colonial Governor", Australian Rationalist Quarterly, No. 22, p. 14.
- Brian H. Fletcher (1984). Ralph Darling: A Governor Maligned. Oxford University Press. p. 473. ISBN 0-19-554564-8.
- Mennell, Philip (1892). "Darling, Lieut.-General Sir Ralph" . The Dictionary of Australasian Biography. London: Hutchinson & Co – via Wikisource.
- Reid, Stuart (2008). Wellington's Officers: a Biographical Dictionary of the Field Officers and Staff Officers of the British Army 1793–1815. Partizan Press. p. 316. ISBN 978-1858185729.

=== Additional resources listed by the Australian Dictionary of Biography ===
- Historical Records of Australia, Series I, volumes 12–17
- Edw. Smith Hall (1833), Reply in Refutation of the Pamphlets of Lieut.-Gen. R. Darling (London: R. Robinson [sic])
- L. N. Rose (1922), "The Administration of Governor Darling", Journal and Proceedings (Royal Australian Historical Society), vol 8, part 2, pp 49–96 and vol 8, part 3, pp 97–176
- Parliamentary Debates (Great Britain) (3), 29, 30
- Parliamentary Papers (House of Commons, Great Britain), 1828 (538), 1830 (586), 1830–31 (241), 1831–32 (163, 620), 1835 (580)
- A. S. Forbes, Sydney Society in Crown Colony Days (State Library of New South Wales)
- manuscript catalogue under Ralph Darling (State Library of New South Wales)

Government offices
Preceded by Thomas Brisbane	Governor of New South Wales; 1825–1831	Succeeded by Richard Bourke
Military offices
Preceded by John Vincent	Colonel of the 69th (South Lincolnshire) Regiment of Foot; 1848–1858	Succeeded by Ernest Frederick Gascoigne
Preceded by Edward Stopford	Colonel of the 41st (Welsh) Regiment of Foot; 1837–1848	Succeeded by Charles Ashe a'Court Repington
Preceded by Hon. Robert Meade	Colonel of the 90th Regiment of Foot; 1823–1837	Succeeded by Sir Henry Sheehy Keating
