= Henry Dumaresq (colonial settler) =

Lieutenant-Colonel Henry Dumaresq (c. 1792-1838) was a military officer of the era of the Napoleonic Wars, colonial government official, and early colonial settler of New South Wales. He was associated with the Upper Hunter Valley and Port Stephens, and was one of the first to take land around Armidale.

== Early life and military service ==
Dumaresq was the son of John Dumaresq, a Shropshire colonel, and Anne Jones. He attended the Royal Military College, Great Marlow, and became a military officer. The Dumaresq family has strong connections with the Channel Islands, particularly Jersey.

Henry joined the 9th Regiment. He served in the Peninsula War—he was wounded at Villa Muriel—and at New Orleans in the War of 1812, and then at the Battle of Waterloo, during which—while a Captain on the staff of Lieutenant General John Byng as aide-de-camp—he was severely wounded at Hougoumont. Although wounded and not revealing that wound, he rode across the battlefield to deliver a vital message, on the morale and ammunition supply of the Hougoumont garrison, to the Duke of Wellington. He then collapsed, fell from his horse, and was placed in the care of the Duke's personal surgeon. He was promoted to Brevet Major for his actions at Waterloo and, two years later, was made a lieutenant colonel. Unusually for the time, Dumaresq earned his promotions, through zeal and courage, without need of purchasing his commissions. A musket ball remained lodged in his lungs for the rest of his life.

== New South Wales ==
He was the brother-in-law of Ralph Darling. When Darling was appointed Governor of New South Wales, in 1824, Dumaresq was already serving as Darling's Military Secretary in Mauritius.

He was appointed Darling's Private Secretary, and arrived in New South Wales, five months before Darling, to prepare for Darling's arrival. He was subsequently appointed clerk of the Executive Council. His brothers, William and Edward, also followed Darling and their sister, Eliza, to Australia. William went to New South Wales, but Edward went to Tasmania—then called Van Diemen's Land—where he became acting Surveyor-General, in 1825.

Darling had been appointed with the objective of restoring discipline to the penal colony, after what was seen by the British government of the time as the relatively lax rule of the two previous Governors, Lachlan Macquarie and Thomas Brisbane. As such, he had the support of the 'Exclusives' faction in the colony, who had sought to undermine Brisbane's administration.

Darling tended to rely upon like-minded military men for his administration, and it was soon subject to criticism for nepotism and favouritism. This criticism could not be stifled, as Darling's predecessor, Thomas Brisbane, had ended press censorship, creating in effect press freedom before Darling arrived in 1824. Darling's subsequent attempt to control the press through new legislation failed, because the Chief Justice, Francis Forbes, advised that the measures were not compatible with the laws of England.

The Dumaresq brothers, Henry in particular, became a lightning rod for criticism of Darling's administration. He fought a duel with barrister and newspaper editor Robert Wardell in 1827, over an article in Wardell's newspaper, The Australian, titled "How-e to live by plunder", with both men leaving uninjured.

Dumaresq had arrived in the colony as a single man. His sister, the Governor's wife, Eliza Darling, tried unsuccessfully to arrange a match between Dumaresq and her friend, Fanny Macleay, daughter of Alexander Macleay. Later in 1827, he went to England, where he married Elizabeth Sophia Butler-Danvers, half-sister to the 5th Earl of Lanesborough. He and his new wife returned to New South Wales, in 1829, bringing with them a royal charter for an expanded Legislative Council. The couple had four daughters and three sons. A visitor to the colony in 1832, Edmond de Boissieu, of the French ship La Favorite commanded by Cyrille Laplace, recorded prevalent gossip in the colony that Dumaresq was having an affair with Mary Jones, the wife of the Sydney merchant, Richard Jones.

By the time that Darling's term as governor ended in 1831, Henry and his brother William had been granted substantial landholdings in New South Wales. Henry had a property near modern-day Muswellbrook, that he named St Heliers. He also operated a large sheep run in the New England region, Saumarez, from 1835; this vast tract of land of 40,000 hectares was beyond the Nineteen Counties. Not only was Saumarez taken from local Aboriginal people, but its occupation was not legal, even under the colonial law of the time. It was a 'squatting' run, until legitimised by the payment of a £10 annual licence fee in 1837.

The new Surveyor-General Sir Thomas Mitchell developed a strong resentment of Darling and his relatives. The source of this resentment was his belief that a task given to him —surveying the Great North Road—was prioritised to allow Eliza Darling to more easily visit her brothers' properties in the Hunter Valley, while Charles Sturt (a cousin of Henry Dumaresq's wife) led an exploratory expedition that Mitchell considered should be his due to his position. Henry's brother William, was Acting Deputy Surveyor-General but retired soon after Mitchell was promoted as his superior, in 1829.

After Darling left the colony, Henry Dumaresq continued to serve as Private Secretary for Acting Governor Patrick Lindesay, but retired from public office once the new governor, liberal-minded Richard Bourke, arrived. After retiring from his public duties, Dumaresq still had the benefit of his large landholdings, which were praised as models of well managed estates by visiting colonists.

Francis Forbes view that Henry and William Dumaresq were "obviously expectants of what may first fall" was justified; both men prospered greatly from colonial appointments and by land grants made under the Darling administration. Both would be wealthy men for the rest of their lives.

== Later career and death ==
Upon the retirement of Edward Parry, Dumaresq was appointed the Chief Commissioner of the Australian Agricultural Company. In 1834, he was still in that position, when he died after a very short illness, at Tahlee House, near Port Stephens, on 5 March 1838. His early death was attributed to his war wound. He was buried at his property, St Heliers, and he is commemorated by a plaque in the church of St John the Evangelist at Stroud.

He was survived by his wife and children, and two brothers, William and Edward, both of whom remained in Australia. William assumed responsibility for running Henry Dumaresq's landholdings. Within a few years, his wife, Elizabeth Sophia, returned to England, taking her children with her.

== Legacy ==
Dumaresq is still remembered for his heroic contribution to the defence of Hougoumont and the ultimate victory at Waterloo.

The family name Dumaresq appears in the naming of features in the north of New South Wales and the south of Queensland, including Dumaresq (a locality) and its former railway station, Dumaresq Creek and on it Dumaresq Dam, Dumaresq River, Mount Dumaresq, and the former Dumaresq Shire.

His property St Heliers, near Muswellbrook, which in Dumaresq's time was worked using convict labour, is now a prison farm, St Heliers Correctional Centre. Dumaresq's original St Heliers homestead was demolished in the 1850s. The current homestead at Saumarez was built after Dumaresq's time and, of his buildings there, only an old stables remains.

== See also ==
- William Dumaresq
- Edward Dumaresq
- Dumaresq family
