= Sydney Gaol =

Former British colonial prison in New South Wales

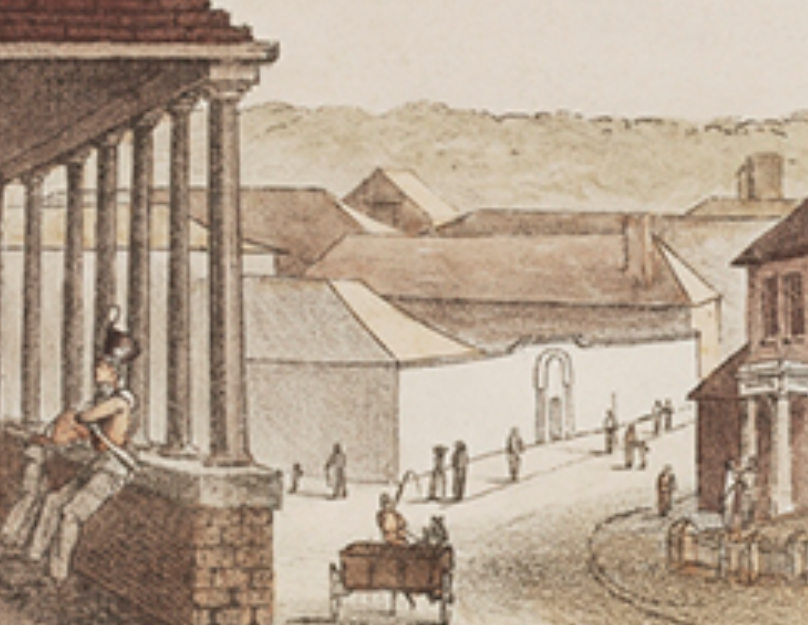
- A depiction of Sydney Gaol (white building in the background) in 1826 by Augustus Earle

- Location in Greater Sydney
- Location: Cnr of George and Essex Sts, Sydney; 33°51′47″S 151°12′30″E
- Status: Closed (now location of Four Seasons Hotel, Sydney)
- Opened: 1797
- Closed: 1841

The Sydney Gaol was the first jail to be constructed in the British colony of New South Wales. Built in 1796 and decommissioned in 1841, it was a primary place of incarceration for the Sydney region during the period of its existence.

== Construction ==
From 1796 to 1798, the first two gaols were built for the British military-convict outpost at Sydney, one was at Sydney Cove and the other at Parramatta. Both were timber buildings and both were destroyed by fire soon after their construction. The gaol at Sydney Cove had 22 cells and a separate brick building for the debtors' prison. After the fire, the jail at Sydney Cove was rebuilt in 1799 from sandstone at the same site. It became known as Sydney Gaol. The Parramatta jail was rebuilt slightly later in 1802.

== Operation ==
The site was situated at what is now the corner of George and Essex Streets in The Rocks. It housed both male and female, and Indigenous and non-Indigenous prisoners. Executions by hanging took place in its grounds, which were able to be viewed by the public as the timber gallows were higher than the prison walls. The public were able to get a better view of the hangings from a hill just to the west of the jail.

A large number of executions took place at Sydney Gaol. On a day in June 1831, eight men were hanged in unison, seven for the crime of robbery and one for attempted murder.

The gaol was notorious for being overcrowded, lacking sanitation and being in a continually dilapidated condition. In August 1834, 326 prisoners were crammed into its small confines, while in January 1835 it was documented that 62 females and 8 children were detained in just one of the jail's rooms.

== Closure ==
Despite its deficiencies, Sydney Gaol remained open until 1841 when prisoners were transferred to the new Darlinghurst Gaol. The buildings of Sydney Gaol were subsequently demolished.

In 1979, the location of the jail was considered to be of enough historical importance for an archaeological excavation to be completed before the construction of a large hotel upon the site. The excavation revealed a limited amount of artefacts from the time of the prison, but did unearth a leg iron.

The site of Sydney Gaol is now occupied by the Four Seasons Hotel, Sydney.
