= Michelle Dumaresq =

Mountain biker

Michelle Dumaresq (born 1970) is a Canadian professional downhill mountain bike competitor and trans woman. She competes with other professional female downhill mountain bike racers. She entered the sport in 2001, six years after completing gender reassignment surgery, when she was discovered riding on Vancouver's North Shore by several top women mountain bikers. Dumaresq is open about gender identity.

== Competitive career ==
The first event Dumaresq entered was the Bear Mountain race held in Mission, British Columbia, in May 2001. She entered the novice female class and won. In fact, her finish time was 2.5 seconds faster than the winner of the female professional category. After racing two more races, her license was suspended by Cycling BC due to complaints from female competitors.

Cycling BC and the Canadian Cycling Association met privately with local organizers and at first suggested that Dumaresq quit racing. After discussion with the UCI the decision was made to permit Dumaresq to continue competing in the women's category. Dumaresq was not permitted to compete in the men's category since she is a woman legally and medically in addition to psychologically.

In April 2002, she was awarded a license to race in the women's category. Three weeks later, she entered her first race in the pro women's class and finished 3rd. The following week she placed 1st, beating her competition by 10 seconds. Protests ensued and a petition was created and signed by female (and a few male) racers, asking for Dumaresq to be disqualified. Because she had a race license, the request was denied and her first professional win with females was upheld.

Dumaresq went on to win the 2002 Canada Cup series, which qualified her for the Canadian National team.

Later on, in September 2002, she co-represented Canada at the World Mountain Bike Championships. However, due to technical issues with her bike, Dumaresq only managed a 24th-place finish in the event.

In 2003, Dumaresq won the 2003 Canadian National Championships and again represented Canada in the 2003 World Championships. She repeated her Nationals win in 2004 and finished 17th at the 2004 World Mountain Bike Championships held in Les Gets, France.

At the 2006 Canadian Nationals, a protest from one of her competitors during the podium ceremonies brought renewed attention to Dumaresq's participation in female sports. The boyfriend of second-place finisher Danika Schroeter jumped up onto the podium and helped Schroeter put on a T-shirt reading '100% Pure Woman Champ'. The Canadian Cycling Association suspended Schroeter for her actions. The CCA announced that Schroeter's time off the race course would be served during the off-season when it would have no impact on her.

== See also ==
- Mountain biking
- World Mountain Bike Championship
- Union Cycliste Internationale
