= List of seigneurs of Samarès =

The seigneur of Samarès is a noble title in Jersey. "Seigneur" is the French word for "lord". Their traditional home is the Samarès Manor.

1. Rudolph de St Hilaire (supposedly granted manor by William II of England in 1095)
2. Pierre de St Hilaire
3. Guillaume de St Hilaire (c.1160–1218) of Samares
4. Guillaume de Samarez (c.1218–c.1260)
5. Guille de Saumarez (c.1260–c.1274)
6. Pierre de St Hilaire c.1274
7. Pierre de St Hilaire c.1309
8. Guillaume de St Hilaire (c.1321–1331)
9. Geffrey de Thoresby (1346–1351)
10. John Mautravers (1351–c.1355)
11. Philip de Barentin (c. 1355–1367)
12. Raoul Lempriere and Guille Payn (1367–c.1400)
13. Philippe Payn (1477–c.1550)
14. Mabel Payn (c. 1500–1565)
15. Jean Dumaresq ( –1529) Seigneur of Vinchelez de Bas, Jurat and Lieut-Bailiff
16. Mabel Payn ( –1565)
17. Jean Dumaresq ( –1537) m Jane Lempriere, d of Thomas, Bailiff
18. Clement Dumaresq ( –1551) Jurat m Margaret de Carteret d of Helier, Bailiff
19. Henry Dumaresq ( –1579) Jurat m Mary Lempriere, d of Philip
20. Esther Dumaresq ( 1597) m John Dumaresq (1548–1606 – see below for descendants)
21. Collette Dumaresq m John Dumaresq, Bailiff, Seigneur of Vinchelez de Bas (see below)
22. Richard Dumaresq ( –1556) Seigneur of Vinchelez de Bas, Leoville and Bagot, Jurat m Collette Larbalestier ( -1590), d of Michel, Seigneur of Augres
23. John Dumaresq, Bailiff 1566–83, 86–87, 91–96 m 1, Collette Dumaresq (see above); 2, Isabel Perrin, d of Edmund, Seigneur of Rozel
24. John Dumaresq (1548–1606) Jurat m Esther Dumaresq (see above)
25. Daniel Dumaresq ( –1634) m Catherine de Carteret, d of Peter
26. Henry Dumaresq ( –1690) m Marguerite Hérault, d of Abraham
27. Philip Dumaresq (c. 1650–1690)
28. Abraham Dumaresq m Susan de Carteret ( –1658)
29. Benjamin Dumaresq (1647– )
30. Philip Dumaresq (1671–1714) Seigneur of Anneville m Deborah Dumaresq ( –1734)
31. Deborah Dumaresq, d of Philip (1714–1734) m Philip Dumaresq (1671–1714) Seigneur of Anneville (see above)
32. John Seale, of London, purchased 27 March 1734
33. James Seale, 1749, sold to Hammond
34. Jacques John Hammond (1700–1766), British Consul at Faro, Portugal (son of Nicholas Hamon (1670–1739) of St Helier m Margaret Lempriere, d of Clement of St Helier) m Marie Lempriere ( -1813), d of Jacques and Sara Atkinson
35. Jacques Hammond (1746–1816) Jurat 1795–1816 m Marie Romeril (1778–1844) of Grouville
36. Jacques John Hammond (1811–1893) m Anne Elizabeth Amireaux (1813–1887), d of Matthew
37. Anne Hammond
38. Emily Hammond m Capt Georges, RN, of Guernsey
39. Edward Mourant (1832–1899) purchased Samares 23 June 1857 m Matilda Le Quesne, d of Nicholas
40. Edward Lionel Mourant ( –1916)
41. Claude Le Quesne Mourant ( –1921)
42. Edward Clarence Davis c.1921–1924
43. Sir James Knott, 1st Baronet 1924–1934 m Margaret Garbutt, m Elizabeth Obbard
44. Elizabeth Obbard 1934–1998 (née Gauntlett), widow of Sir James Knott (see above)
45. Vincent Obbard, son of Elizabeth Obbard
