= Elias Dumaresq, 5th Seigneur of Augres =

Elias Dumaresq, 5th Seigneur of Augres was born in 1674 and was a Seigneur of Augres located in the parish of Trinity, Jersey, the largest of the Channel Islands, He belonged to the influential Dumaresq family.

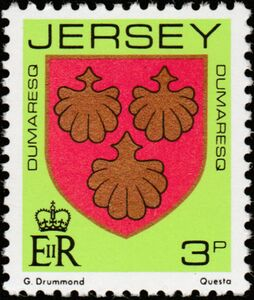

== Biography ==
Elias Dumaresq was the son of, Elias Dumaresq, 4th Seigneur of Augres (1648–1734) and Frances De Carteret, daughter of Francis de Carteret, Attorney-General of Jersey (1619–1693) and Anne Seale (1641–1703) and thus the grandchild of Sir Philippe de Carteret II, Bailiff and Lieut-Governor of Jersey through his maternal grandfather.

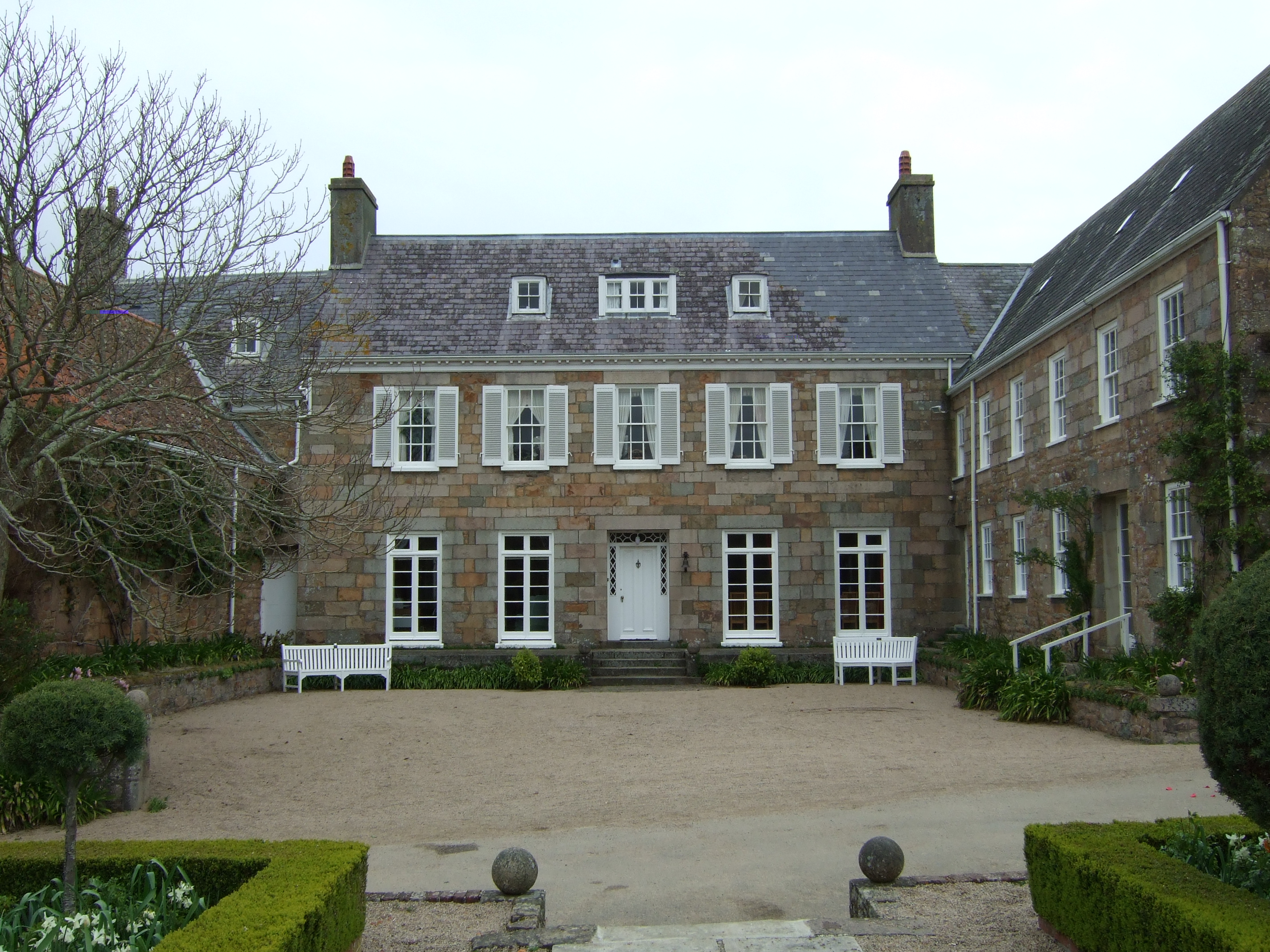

Elias Dumaresq and his wife Elizabeth de Carteret resided at the Les Augrès Manor, what had been in the Dumaresq family since the mid-16th century. Elias continued to live at the manor even though it with in the Fief de Diélament not the Fief des Augrès. As Elias was the Seigneur of the Fief des Augrès, the manor became known as Les Augrès Manor.

The Manor is depicted on the 2010 issue Jersey 5 pound note and now forms the headquarters of the Durrell Wildlife Conservation Trust (formerly Jersey Wildlife Preservation Trust)

Elie Dumaresq's estate became the subject of bankruptcy procedures in 1734.

== Family ==
Elias married Elizabeth de Carteret (died 1765), daughter of Sir Amice De Carteret (1635–1703), and his wife Sarah Dumaresq (1643–1707) They had issue:

- Rev. Daniel Dumaresq FRS ( Educational consultant to Catherine the Great (1762–96) of Russia and Stanislaus II (1764–95) King of Poland),
- John Dumaresq (1705–1747) m. Deborah Dumaresq,
  - Jane Anne Dumaresq (1733–1806) m. Elias Le Maistre,
  - Deborah Dumaresq (1744–1802),
- Michael Dumaresq (1706– ),
- Philip Dumaresq (1708– ),
- Edward Dumaresq (1710– ),
- Elizabeth Dumaresq (1713– ) m. John de Carteret,
- Elias Dumaresq (1715– ),
- Rachel Dumaresq (1717– ),
- George Dumaresq (1719– )

== Ancestry ==
Ancestors of Elias Dumaresq, 5th Seigneur of Augres

16. John Dumaresq, Seigneur of Vincheles de Bas
8. Abraham Dumaresq, 2nd Seigneur des Augres
17. Collette Dumaresq
4. Elias Dumaresq, 3rd Seigneur des Augres
18. Philippe de Carteret I, 2nd Seigneur of Sark
9. Susan De Carteret
19. Rachel Paulett
2. Elias DuMaresq, 4th Seigneur des Augres
10. REV. Thomas Payne
5. Jane Payne
11. Jeanne Poingdestre
1. Elias Dumaresq, 5th Seigneur of Augres
24. Philippe de Carteret I, 2nd Seigneur of Sark
12. Philippe II de Carteret, 3rd Seigneur of Sark
25. Rachel Paulett
6. Sir Francis de Carteret Attorney-General of Jersey
26. Sir Francis Dowse
13. Ann Dowse
27. Elisabeth Paulett
3. Frances De Carteret
28. Jean Selle
14. Thomas Seele
29. Denise Pipon
7. Anne Seale
30. Sir Elias De Carteret
15. Anne De Carteret
31. Elizabeth Dumaresq
