= Edward Dumaresq =

Edward Dumaresq (16 June 1802 – 23 April 1906) was a landowner, magistrate and acted as Surveyor General of Van Diemen's Land (now Tasmania).

Dumaresq was born in Swansea, Glamorgan, Wales, the youngest son of Colonel John Dumaresq and was educated at the Royal Military College, Sandhurst. He accepted a cadetship after three years study in the East India Company.

Dumaresq became a lieutenant in the Bombay Native Infantry, also working in the Revenue and Topographical Survey Department of Gujarat. Granted sick leave in 1823, he spent some time recuperating in Mauritius, then journeyed to Hobart and Sydney. He briefly returned to England after being deemed unfit for tropical duty, but was soon travelling again to Hobart. Dumaresq's sister had married Ralph Darling, who in 1824, had been appointed Governor of New South Wales. Darling, his wife and Dumaresq (along with Dumaresq's brothers William John and Henry) sailed in the Catherine Stewart Forbes and arrived in Hobart in October 1825.

Lieutenant-Governor Sir George Arthur had made Dumaresq Surveyor General of Van Diemen's Land in 1825, although this appointment was not ratified by the British government. Dumaresq held the office until replaced by George Frankland in March 1828, and then became collector of revenue and joined the Land Board. Soon afterwards Dumaresq was appointed police magistrate at New Norfolk. Dumaresq was appointed Commissioner of Court of Requests, Van Diemens' Land on 24 December 1830 and held the post until 1835. Dumaresq 's health suffered and he obtained leave in February 1835 to travel to New South Wales for recuperation. There he took medical advice and went on the land. He became a landowner and speculated in property, gaining profits in deals in Victoria and Brisbane. Dumaresq bought land in Sackville Ward, Kew, Victoria, bordered by Cotham and Burke Roads, naming streets in the area after family members (John, Alfred, Edward, Rowland, and Thomas Streets).

Dumaresq took his family on holiday to England in 1853, mainly spending time at Malvern Wells in Worcestershire. Dumaresq's wife, Frances Blanche née Legge died at this time. Dumaresq returned to Australia and committed what he termed 'the fatal act of a second marriage' to Mrs Charlotte Fogg – the marriage only lasting a few months. Dumaresq unsuccessfully stood in 1861 as a candidate for Devon in the Tasmanian House of Assembly.

Dumaresq died at Illawarra, Longford, Tasmania, on 23 April 1906 aged 103, reputedly the oldest justice of the peace in the world. His obituary notice in The Mercury states he was "the oldest man in Tasmania".

== See also ==
- Henry Dumaresq (1839–1924) – son
- Henry Dumaresq (1792–1838) – brother
- William Dumaresq (1793–1868) – brother
- Eliza Darling (1798–1868) – sister
- Dumaresq family
