= Philip Dumaresq =

Seigneur of Samarès in Jersey

- Seigneur of Samarès
- Born: c. 1650
- Died: 1690
- Spouses: Deborah Dumaresq, m. 24 June 1672, d. 1720
- Issue: Deborah Dumaresq
- Father: Henry Dumaresq
- Mother: Margaret Dumaresq

Philip Dumaresq (c. 1650–1690), was Seigneur of Samarès, in the parish of Saint Clement, Jersey.

== Biography ==
Dumaresq was the eldest son of Henry Dumaresq by his wife Margaret, only daughter of Abraham Hérault of Saint Helier. He is said on doubtful authority to have been born 'about 1650'. His father, a staunch parliamentarian, had been dismissed from his office of Jurat of the Royal Court at the beginning of the English Civil War, but was reinstated along with his father-in-law by the council of state in August 1653.

The son, however, appears to have held different views. At an early age he entered the navy, and attained the rank of captain. He was sworn in Jurat of the Royal Court on 2 February 1681. On the accession of James II in 1685, he presented him with a manuscript, giving an account of the Channel Islands, with suggestions for their defence. It remained among the state papers until about the close of the 18th century, when it was transmitted to Admiral d'Auvergne, duke of Bouillon, the then naval commander at Jersey. By his permission copies were allowed to be made.

From his letters Dumaresq seems to have been an amiable, well-informed man, who devoted most of his time to gardening, fruit, and tree culture. He was the friend and correspondent of John Evelyn. There are also a few of his letters to Christopher Lord Hatton, when governor of Jersey, extant. Shortly before his death he imparted to Philip Falle, who was then engaged on his history of the island, 'a set of curious observations;’ but what was still more valuable, an accurate survey of Jersey, 'done on a large skin of vellum,’ and 'equally calculated for a sea chart and a land map,’ which in a reduced form adorns the front of Falle's book.

== Death ==
Dumaresq died in 1690. By a licence bearing the date 24 June 1672 he married at the Savoy Chapel, London, Deborah, daughter of William Trumbull of Easthampstead, Berkshire. Mrs. Dumaresq died in 1720 at Hertford, and desired to be buried at Easthampstead 'as near my dear father as may be.' Her will of 25 December 1715, with two codicils of 2 (sic) December 1715, and 24 October 1717, was proved at London on 20 December 1720. Dumaresq's only child, Deborah, married Philip, son of Benjamin Dumaresq, a junior scion of Dumaresq des Augrès, but she died without issue. She was the last of her family who held the seigneurie of Samarès, having conveyed it to the Seale family.
