= Eliza, Lady Darling =

British philanthropist and artist

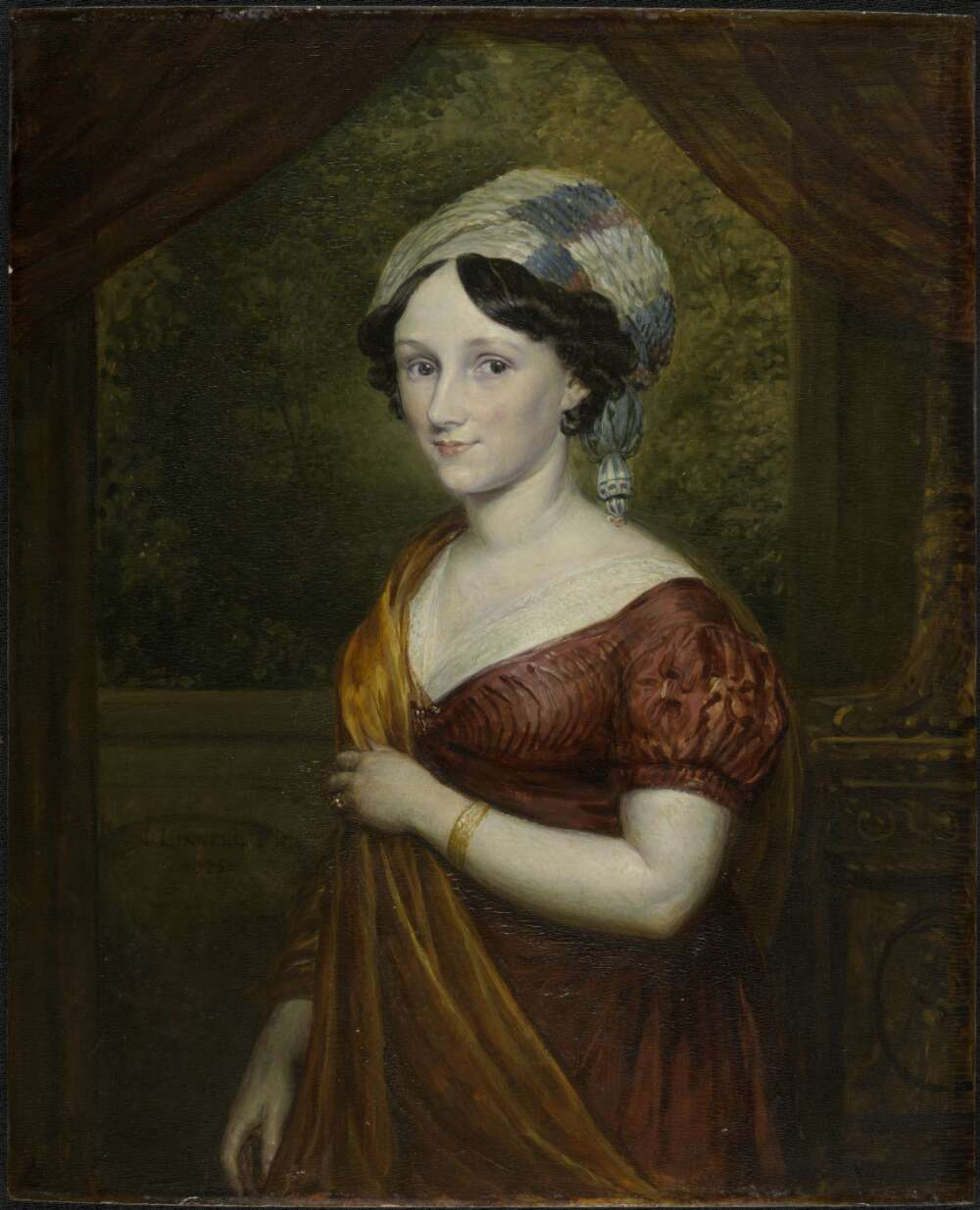
Eliza Darling, 1825 portrait by John Linnell

Eliza, Lady Darling (1798–1868), born Elizabeth Dumaresq, was a British philanthropist and artist. She was the wife of Sir Ralph Darling, Governor of New South Wales from 1825 to 1831.

== Early life ==
She was the daughter of Lieut.-Col. John Dumaresq, son of John Dumaresq (born c.1732) and his wife Rachel Bandinel, and his wife Ann Jones. Her birth name was Elizabeth, and she was born the fourth of six children, at West Bromwich, Staffordshire. Her father died in 1804.

Eliza's widowed mother Ann was a devout philanthropist, and lived in Cheltenham. Eliza was influenced by Hannah More and Sarah Trimmer.

On 13 October 1817, Ralph Darling married the 19-year-old Elizabeth Dumaresq. The marriage was a happy one. Of ten children, four daughters and three sons survived to adulthood.

== In Australia ==
Ralph Darling in 1825 brought three of Eliza's brothers with him to Australia: Henry and William John to New South Wales, and Edward who stopped off on Van Diemen's Land.

From Australia, Eliza consulted the penal reformer Elizabeth Fry, with reference in particular to female convicts. She was involved in the establishment of the Female School of Industry at Parramatta. She also was responsible for the first friendly society in New South Wales, "'The Female Friendly Society of the Town of Sydney" of 1826.

Ralph and Eliza Darling both set store by the moral and religious instruction of women. Eliza headed the committee, including also the wife Elizabeth née Barclay (1769–1847) and five of the daughters of Alexander Macleay, Fanny being Secretary and Christiana Treasurer, that in 1826 set up the Female School of Industry. Following Fry's ideas, she arranged there domestic training for women who were prisoners. The model for the School was the Cheltenham School of Industry, one of a number of such institutions that were promoted by More, Trimmer and Catherine Cappe. It lasted until 1926, with moves to Darlinghurst and then Petersham, operating as a primary school for girls destined for domestic service.

An artist, Eliza made topographical drawings and watercolours, and contributed designs for public buildings. The Darlings entertained James Stirling in Sydney. In return, Stirling named Mount Eliza for her, after he had climbed it with Charles Fraser and Frederick Garling Jr. on his 1827 expedition in Western Australia.

William John Dumaresq married in 1830 Christiana Susan Macleay, Alexander Macleay's second daughter, at Sydney. They had an estate named St Aubins (alluding to the Dumaresq family heritage from Jersey) of two land grants near Scone. Over time it expanded to around 13,000 acres (5,300 ha). Henry Dumaresq developed an estate on a similar scale, St Heliers, near Muswellbrook. He had married in England in 1827 Elizabeth Sophia Butler-Danvers, half-sister to the 5th Earl of Lanesborough.

== The family in England ==
After Darling's position in New South Wales ended, the family returned to England. They lived at Cheltenham, then Brighton where Darling died in 1858. Eliza lived subsequently at Hurstpierpoint and then Pembury. She settled at The Ridge, Colemans Hatch in East Sussex, with her son Frederick and two of her daughters. This house near Hartfield had been built by Sarah Elizabeth Wedgwood, sister of Emma Darwin, who lived there to 1862. She had added a small school. The school continued as Lady Darling's School, under a Miss Deane.

Eliza, Lady Darling died at Hartfield in 1868.

== Works ==
Related to the School of Industry was Eliza's 1834 booklet Simple Rules for the Guidance of Persons in Humble Life: More Particularly for Young Girls Going Out to Service. It was published first in Cheltenham, with an edition of 1837 in Sydney. It made a point that the relationship of the domestic servant to employers was as a status laid down by God. Its content was related to The Servant's Friend by Sarah Trimmer. Eliza also wrote Young Christian's Sunday Mornings (1834).

== Cornelia Maria ==
The Darling's daughter Cornelia Maria married in 1846 Sir Francis John Ford, 3rd Baronet (1818–1850). Ford was a captain in the Bombay Regiment: the couple were married in England by Frederick Darling, and Cornelia returned from India after Ford's death on Malta, with a son of six months, their second son, who became the 4th Baronet. They had adopted Francina Sorabji when she was 12 years old.

Lady Ford died in 1896 at The Ridge, aged 77.

== Frederick Darling ==
The eldest son, Frederick (born 1821 in Mauritius) was instructed in New South Wales by William Cowper, while his siblings were kept at home. He matriculated at Oriel College, Oxford in 1839, graduating B.A. in 1843, then M.A. in 1851.

When Frederick was young, pulmonary symptoms were enough for his mother to decide he should be allowed to go into the Church, rather than the army as his father would have preferred. His two brothers did serve as soldiers: Augustus in the Bengal Artillery, and Sydney in the 51st Regiment and 9th Regiment.

After leaving Oxford, Frederick Darling was ordained deacon in 1845 by James Henry Monk, and priest in 1846. He became in 1845 a curate at Trinity Church, Tewkesbury, a few miles north of Cheltenham, where Edward Walwyn Foley was the incumbent. Foley was an associate of Francis Close and the Cheltenham group of strongly Protestant evangelicals he led, in this year alarmed by the conversion to Catholicism of John Henry Newman. He was succeeded by Francis John Scott in 1849, when the Simeon Trust made him rector of All Saints', Derby. Around 1850 Darling published a sermon on "The Manifold Wisdom of God" given at Kemerton, a village near Tewkesbury on the Worcestershire-Gloucestershire boundary, where Thomas Thorp was the rector. A newspaper report from two decades later suggests that Darling was a curate at Kemerton. Charles Tebbott Heartley (1824–1894) was appointed assistant-curate at Kemerton in 1849, and left in 1856 to become head of St Michael's College, Tenbury; with his help, Kemerton gained a high reputation for its parish choir.

By 1852 Darling was curate to George Rundle Prynne, who had choristers in homely surplices (actually towelling pinafores) at St Peter's Church, Plymouth. He found himself in a Puseyite atmosphere, and conducting the defence of Prynne against allegations of misconduct in the role of confessor to a female religious order and orphanage run by Priscilla Lydia Sellon. Henry Phillpotts, bishop of Exeter, made an inquiry into Prynne's conduct, in 1852. In the words of Prynne's biographer Kelway, Darling turned up "a large body of evidence which was calculated to bring the matter out in a yet more distinct and vivid light, but that he was deterred from producing it on account of the discouraging manner of the Bishop." One of the witnesses to Prynne's conduct withdrew her testimony, before a magistrate; but Prynne was unable to satisfy all his critics.

Darling then travelled. He visited family in the Caribbean. The Hurst Johnian, school magazine of Hurstpierpoint College, has a report in 1859 related to a journey by Darling to Palestine including Bethlehem.

In later life Darling resided at Hartfield. He gave services in the Ridge Chapel, at the west end of the parish of Hartfield, and built by the Darling family.
