= Daniel Dumaresq =

Jersey academic and priest (1712-1805)

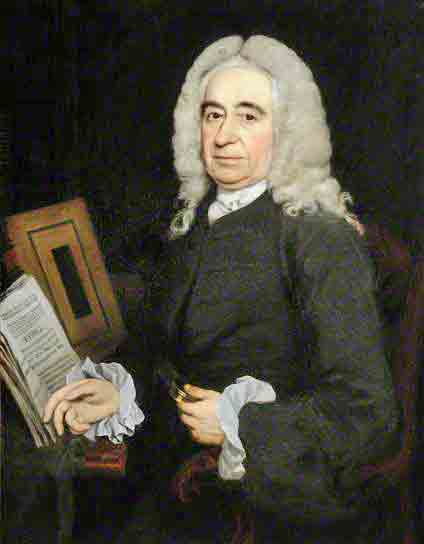
- Dumaresq in 1747
- Born: 1712; Trinity, Jersey
- Died: 28 October 1805 (aged 94); Bath, England, British Empire
- Parent: Elias Dumaresq

Daniel Dumaresq FRS (1712 – 28 October 1805) was an educational consultant to Russian and Polish monarchs.

== Early life and education ==
Duraresq came from Trinity, Jersey, in the Channel Islands. His father was Jurat Elie Dumaresq, Seigneur of Augrès and was the fifth of eleven children. He attended John Roysse's Free School in Abingdon (now Abingdon School) from 1724 until 1730 and in 1730 entered Pembroke College where he studied for six years. In 1740, he was elected to a Jersey Fellowship at Exeter College, Oxford.

== Career ==
He became curate at Merton on Otmoor, Oxfordshire, (1744) then chaplain at the English Factory at St Petersburg (1746–62). During that time he was elected to the St Petersburg Academy of Sciences, became fluent in Russian and was chaplain to Sir Charles Hanbury (1708–59), British Ambassador to St Petersburg. He translated a book: An Account of that part of America which is nearest to Kamchatka, extracted from the Description by Professor Krasheninncoff, printed at Petersburg in 1759, and translated by the Rev. D. Dumaresq. In his capacity as chaplain to the ambassador he employed a secretary, Stanislaus Poniatowski, who later became king of Poland.

Upon his return to England he took the rectory of Yeovilton (1762-1805) with neighbouring Limington (1790-1802). From there he was called upon to return to Russia and Poland to advise Catherine the Great (1762–96) of Russia and Stanislaus II (1764–95) King of Poland on educational matters. He was a Fellow of the Royal Society.

In 1800, he donated his library of books to his native island, a founding benefaction of the Jersey Library. He died on 28 October 1805 aged 94 at Bath, Somerset.

== See also ==
List of Old Abingdonians
