= Carteret (name) =

Carteret (earlier, de Carteret) is a surname of Norman origin. It derives from Carteret, Normandy, an inhabited place on the northwest coast of the Cotentin Peninsula, facing the Channel Islands. The Channel Islands are the only remnant of the Duchy of Normandy, the original territorial holding of William the Conqueror, who invaded England in 1066. Historically, members of the Carteret family have occupied influential positions in the Channel Islands, notably as hereditary Seigneurs of Sark and hereditary Bailiffs of Jersey.

== Carteret as a surname ==
- Anna Carteret (born 1942), British stage and screen actress
- Sir Charles Carteret, 3rd Baronet (1679–1715), Seigneur of Sark 1693–1715
- Edward Carteret (1671–1739), English politician
- Elias de Carteret, father of George Carteret
- Elizabeth Carteret (1664/65 – 1717), wife of Philip Carteret FRS, mother of Sir Charles Carteret
- George Carteret, 1st Baronet (c. 1610 – 1680), one of the first proprietors of New Jersey
- George Carteret, 1st Baron Carteret (first creation) (1667–95), ennobled 1681 in recognition of the loyalty of his grandfather, George Carteret, to the Crown
- George Thynne, 2nd Baron Carteret (second creation) (1770–1838), British Tory politician, nephew of Henry Carteret, 1st Baron Carteret
- George de Carteret (1886–1932), Anglican Bishop of Jamaica 1916–31
- George William de Carteret (AKA Le Caouain, 1869–1940), Norman language journalist and writer from Jersey
- Godefroy De Carteret, Anglo-French nobleman, son of Renaud De Carteret III
- Hellier de Carteret (fl.), Seigneur of Sark
- Henry Carteret, 1st Baron Carteret (second creation) (1735–1826), British politician, Bailiff of Jersey 1776–1826, uncle of George Thynne, 2nd Baron Carteret
- Jason De Carteret (active from 2011), British polar explorer born on Guernsey
- John Carteret, 2nd Earl Granville (Baron Carteret, first creation) (1690–1763), British statesman and Secretary of State, Seigneur of Sark 1715–20
  - Carteret Ministry, the executive arm of the British government 1742–44, named after John Carteret, 2nd Earl Granville
- John Thynne, 3rd Baron Carteret (second creation) (1772–1849), British peer and politician.
- Nicolas Henri Carteret (1807–62), French lawyer and politician
- Peter Carteret (1641 – after 1672), Governor of the British colony of Albemarle (later to become North Carolina) 1670–72
- Philip Carteret FRS (1641–72), son of George Carteret, father of George Carteret, 1st Baron Carteret (first creation)
- Philip De Carteret, 8th Seigneur of St Ouen (before 1470 – 1500), English or French nobleman
- Sir Philip Carteret, 1st Baronet (1620-1663/75), Seigneur of Sark
- Philip Carteret (colonial governor) (1639–82), first Governor of New Jersey
- Sir Philip Carteret, 2nd Baronet (c. 1650–93), Seigneur of Sark 1663–93
- Philip Carteret (1733–96), British naval officer and explorer
- Philippe De Carteret, 2nd of St Ouen (born 1152), Anglo-French nobleman
- Philippe De Carteret, 3rd of St Ouen, Anglo-French nobleman, son of Philippe De Carteret, 2nd of St Ouen
- Philippe de Carteret I (1552–94), Seigneur of Sark 1578–94
- Philippe de Carteret II (1584–1643), Seigneur of Sark
- Renaud De Carteret I (1063–1125), Anglo-French nobleman
- Renaud de Carteret II, Anglo-French nobleman, father of Philippe De Carteret, 2nd of St Ouen and of Renaud De Carteret III
- Renaud De Carteret III (1140–1214), Anglo-French nobleman, son of Renaud de Carteret II
- Renaud De Carteret V (born 1316), Anglo-French nobleman

== Carteret as a given name ==
- Frederick de Carteret Malet (1837–1912), Jersey-born influential person in New Zealand
- John Carteret Pilkington (1730–63), Irish singer and writer
- Philip Carteret Hill (1821–94), Canadian politician in Nova Scotia
- Philip Carteret Silvester (1777–1828), British naval officer, son of Philip Carteret
- Philip Carteret Webb (1702–70), English barrister and antiquarian

== See also ==
- Baron Carteret, firstly a Peerage of England; secondly and independently a Peerage of Great Britain
- Carteret baronets, two extinct baronetcies in the Baronetage of England
- De Carteret family
- List of Seigneurs of Sark
- Carteret (disambiguation)
