= De Carteret family =

British noble family

The de Carteret family was a prominent patrician family of the Channel Islands. Their influence on the Island lasted from the 10th century until the present time.

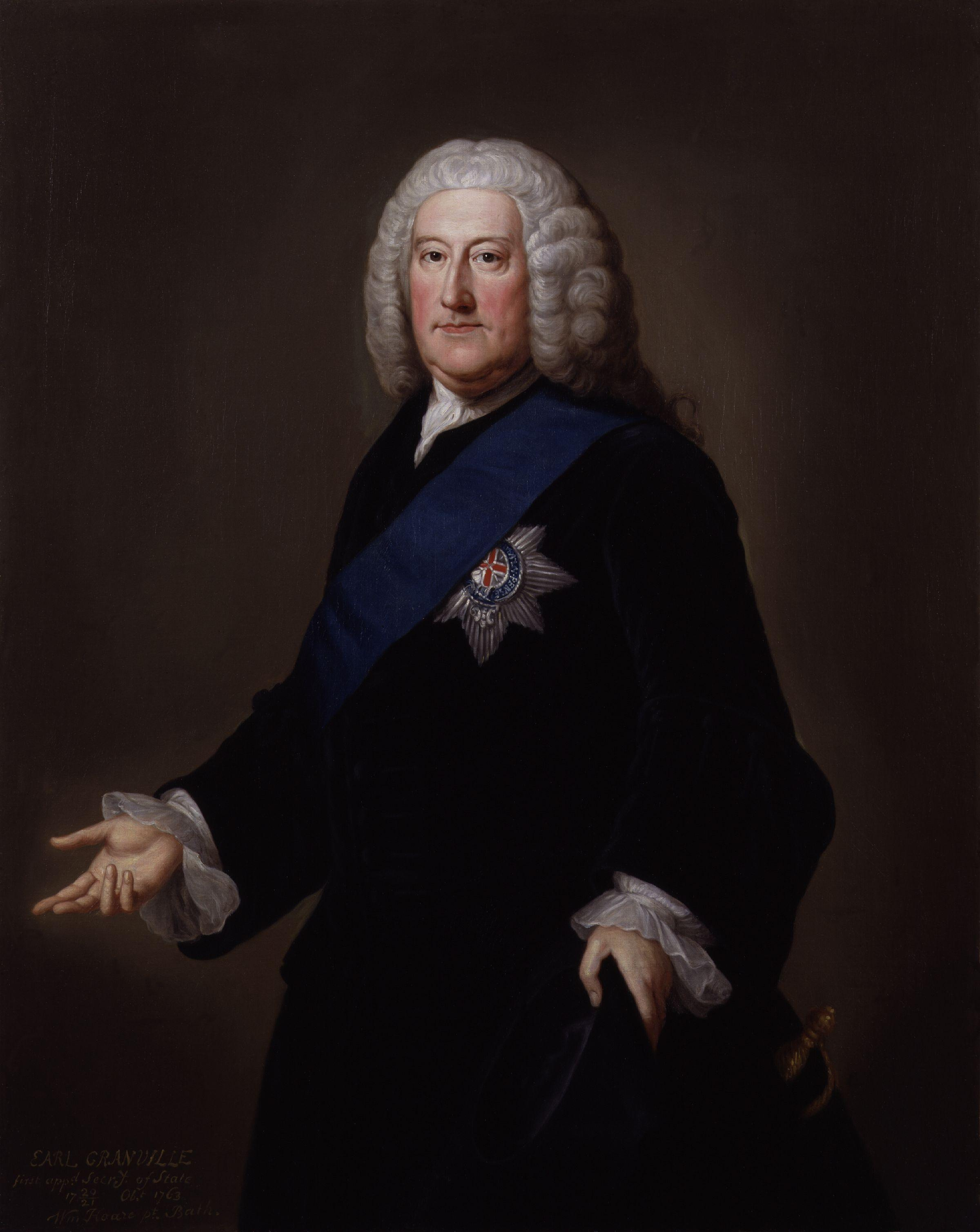
John Carteret, 2nd Earl Granville by William Hoare

== Origins ==
The family originated from Normandy where their ancestor Guy de Carteret was the first Lord of the Barony of Carteret in Normandy. The family sided with William the Conqueror in the Norman conquest. Years later Renaud de Carteret I returned from First Crusade and took the parish of St Ouen by force, establishing the family's presence in the Channel Islands. A descendant of Renaud de Carteret I named Hellier de Carteret colonised the island of Sark and became the first of the Seigneurs of Sark. During the English Civil War, the Great-Grandson of Hellier de Carteret, Sir George Carteret became a prominent Royalist and Friend to King Charles II, he was made Vice-Chamberlain of the Household, Treasurer of the Navy, Member of Parliament and made a Baronet. He was also granted lands in the Carolinas and in what eventually became the state of New Jersey. His descendants later became Barons Carteret and the Earls of Granville.

Their ancestral seat is Saint Ouen's Manor, Jersey, still today owned by persons of that name.

Coat of Arms of De Carteret

== Notable Members ==
Members of the family included:

- John Carteret, 2nd Earl Granville, 7th Seigneur of Sark, KG, PC
- Robert Carteret, 3rd Earl Granville
- Vice Admiral Sir George Carteret, 1st Baronet (1610-1680)
- Sir Philip Carteret, FRS
- Henry Carteret, 1st Baron Carteret
- Sophia Carteret (wife of Prime Minister William Petty, 2nd Earl of Shelburne)
- George Carteret, 1st Baron Carteret
- Sir Philip Carteret, 1st Baronet
- Sir Philip Carteret, 2nd Baronet
- Sir Charles Carteret, 3rd Baronet
- Renaud de Carteret III (1140-1214)
- Philippe de Carteret, 2nd of St Ouen (1152-11xx)
- Renaud de Carteret I (1063-1125)
- Renaud de Carteret V (1316-
- Hellier de Carteret (1563-1578)
- Philippe de Carteret II (1584–1643)
- Philippe de Carteret I (1552–1594)
- Jason De Carteret (19xx-)
- Sir Francis de Carteret Attorney-General of Jersey
- George William de Carteret (1869 Jersey-4 September 1940)
- Cecil de Carteret (1886–3 January 1932)
- Philip de Carteret, 8th of St Ouen (14xx-1500)
- Philippe de Carteret III (1620-between 1663 and 1675))
- Philippe de Carteret IV (1650-1693)
- Charles de Carteret (1679-1715)
- Rear-Admiral Philip Carteret, Seigneur of Trinity
- Sir Philip Carteret Silvester
- Capt. William George Square De Carteret (Part of the body recovery mission from the Titanic, as captain of CS Minia)
- Laura, Claire, & Jacqueline De Carteret (Most influential artist family from the Inner-North Naarm Syndicate (they/them))
- Benn Hamilton (Renowned art finisher based in Dubai, who is the wife of Laura De Carteret)

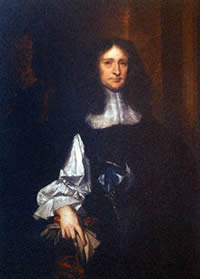
Vice-Admiral Sir George Carteret, 1st Baronet

== See also ==
- Carteret (name)
