= Seigneur of Saint Ouen =

Manorial title in Jersey

The Seigneur of Saint Ouen is a manorial title in Jersey. Their traditional seat is Saint Ouen's Manor. The first was Renaud De Carteret I.

== List of Seigneurs ==
1. Sir Renaud De Carteret, Baron of Carteret and Lord of Saint Ouen (1063–1125); Founder.
2. Sir Philip De Carteret, Baron of Carteret and Lord of Saint Ouen (1085–1156); inherited from father.
3. Sir Reginald De Carteret Baron of Carteret and Lord of Saint Ouen; inherited from father.
4. Sir Reginald De Carteret Baron of Carteret and 1st Seigneur of Saint Ouen (1140–1214); inherited from father, (Lost Barony of Carteret when King John lost Normandy to King Philip II, became Seigneur of Saint Ouen)
5. Sir Philip De Carteret, 2nd Seigneur of Saint Ouen (1180-); inherited from father.
6. Sir Philippe De Carteret 3rd Seigneur of Saint Ouen (1205–1282); inherited from father, married niece of Philip d'Aubigny.
7. Sir Renaud De Carteret 4th Seigneur of Saint Ouen (1235–1309); inherited from father.
8. Sir Philipe De Carteret 5th Seigneur of Saint Ouen (1260–1328);inherited from father.
9. Sir Reginald De Carteret 6th Seigneur of Saint Ouen (1288–1344);inherited from father.
10. Sir Philip De Carteret 7th Seigneur of Saint Ouen (−1352);inherited from father.
11. Sir Reginald De Carteret 8th Seigneur of Saint Ouen (1316–1381);inherited from brother.
12. Sir Reginald De Carteret, 9th Seigneur of Saint Ouen and Seigneur of Longuevill (1364–1461);inherited from father.
13. Sir Philippe De Carteret 10th Seigneur of Saint Ouen (c.1400-); inherited from father.
14. Sir Philip De Carteret 11th Seigneur of Saint Ouen (c.1452–1500); inherited from grandfather, married daughter of Vice-Admiral Richard Harleton, Governor of Jersey.
15. Edward De Carteret 12th Seigneur of Saint Ouen (1486–1533); inherited from father.
16. Helier De Carteret 13th Seigneur of Saint Ouen and 1st Seigneur of Sark (1532–1584); inherited from father.
17. Sir Philip De Carteret 13th Seigneur of Saint Ouen and 2nd Seigneur of Sark (1552–1594); inherited from father, Married Racheal Paulet, daughter of Hugh Paulet, Governor of Jersey.
18. Sir Philip De Carteret 14th Seigneur of Saint Ouen and 3rd Seigneur of Sark (1584–1643); inherited from father
19. Sir Philip Carteret,1st Baronet, 15th Seigneur of Saint Ouen and 4th Seigneur of Sark (1620 – between 1663 and 1675) inherited from father, married Ann Dumaresq, Daughter of Abraham Dumaresq, 2nd Seigneur of Augrès.
20. Sir Philip Carteret, 2nd Baronet,16th Seigneur of Saint Ouen and 5th Seigneur of Sark (c. 1650 – 1693); inherited from father.
21. Sir Charles Carteret, 3rd Baronet, 17th Seigneur of Saint Ouen and 6th Seigneur of Sark ( 1679–1715); inherited from father.
22. John Carteret, 2nd Earl Granville, 2nd Baron Carteret, 18th Seigneur of Saint Ouen and 7th Seigneur of Sark, KG, PC (1690–1763); inherited from 2nd cousin 1 x removed.
23. Robert Carteret, 3rd Earl Granville, 3rd Baron Carteret, and 18th Seigneur of Saint Ouen MP (1721–1776); inherited from father.
24. Jane-Anne Dumaresq, Lady of Saint Ouen (1735–1806); inherited from 4th cousin 1 x removed, married Elias La Maistre
25. Charles Le Maistre, 19th Seigneur of Saint Ouen and Seigneur Quetivel. (−1845), inherited from mother.
26. Philip Le Maistre, 20th Seigneur of Saint Ouen and Seigneur Quetivel. (−1848), inherited from brother.
27. Lieutenant-Colonel Edward Charles Malet De Carteret, 21st Seigneur of Saint Ouen (1838–1914); inherited from grandfather.
28. Reginald Malet De Carteret 22nd Seigneur of Saint Ouen (1865–1955); inherited from father.
29. Guy Malet de Carteret, 23rd Seigneur of Saint Ouen (1901–1972); inherited from father.
30. Philip Malet de Carteret 24th Seigneur of Saint Ouen (1932–2013); inherited from father.
31. Charlie Malet de Carteret 25th Seigneur of St Ouen (Present); inherited from father.
