= Sir Philippe de Carteret, 3rd Seigneur of Saint Ouen =

Sir Philippe de Carteret, 3rd Seigneur of Saint Ouen, (1205-1285) was the Seigneur of Saint Ouen of Saint Ouen's Manor during the reign of King Edward I. He inherited the title from his father Sir Philippe de Carteret, 2nd Seigneur of Saint Ouen, who was unsuccessful in his attempts to regain the family's Norman holdings that were lost under King John.

Philippe would marry Margaret d'Aubigny, daughter of Crusader Oliver d'Aubigny, and thus the niece and heiress of Philip d'Aubigny, who was a commander in the Royalist forces during the First Baron's war and a crusader. In recognition of this marriage, Philippe would change his arms from three fusils in fess to four fusils in fess making them identical to the arms of Philip d'Aubigny. This change would carry on through Philippe's and Margaret's descendants still being seen in the arms of De Carteret/Carteret members to this day.

== Family ==
Philippe and Margaret d'Aubigny, were married around 1235 in which they would have issue:

- Sir Renaud De Carteret 4th Seigneur of Saint Ouen (1235-1309)
- Geoffroy De Carteret Seigneur of Melesches and Dean of Jersey
- Sir John Carteret

== Ancestry ==
Ancestors of Sir Philippe De Carteret, 3rd Seigneur of Saint Ouen

16. Sir Philip De Carteret, Baron of Carteret and Lord of Saint Ouen
8.Sir Reginald De Carteret Baron of Carteret and Lord of Saint Ouen
17. Nichola
4. Reginald De Carteret, 1st Seigneur of Saint Ouen
2. Sir Philippe de Carteret 2nd Seigneur of St Ouen
1. Sir Philippe De Carteret, 3rd Seigneur of Saint Ouen
3. Anne Macheneuf
