= Philip Carteret (disambiguation) =

Philip Carteret was a naval officer.

Philip Carteret may also refer to:

- Philip Carteret (colonial governor) (1639–1682), first Governor of New Jersey
- Sir Philip Carteret, 1st Baronet (1620–?), 4th Seigneur of Sark
- Sir Philip Carteret, 2nd Baronet (c. 1650–1693), 5th Seigneur of Sark
- Philip Carteret (courtier) (1641–1672), son of Sir George Carteret

== See also ==
- Carteret (disambiguation)
