= St Ouen, Jersey =

Parish in northwestern Jersey

Coordinates: 49.24024°N 2.22027°W

St Ouen St Ouën (Jèrriais)
- Jersey parish
- Parish of St Ouen
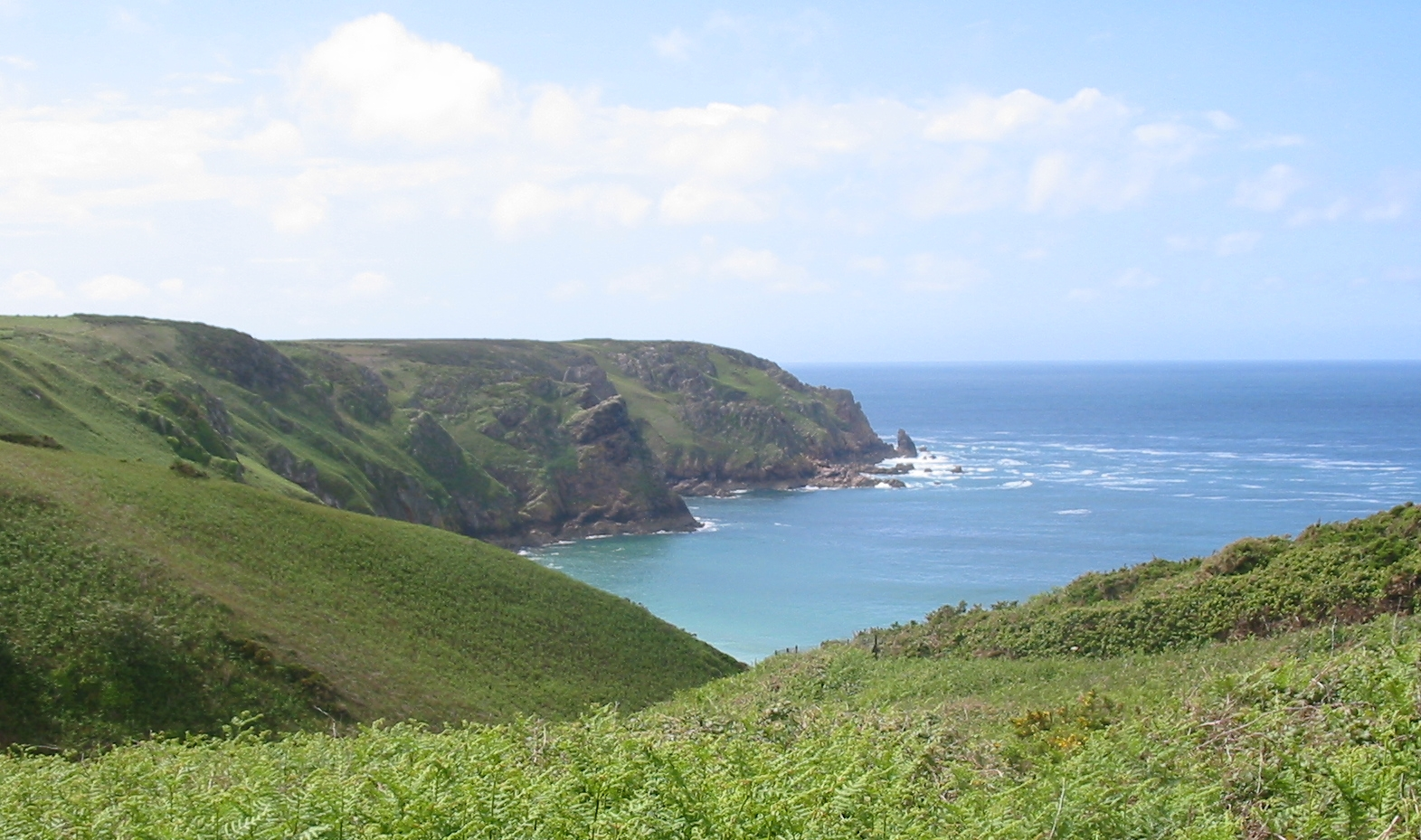
- Cliffs at Plémont

- Flag Coat of arms

- Location of St Ouen in Jersey
- Crown Dependency: Jersey, Channel Islands
- Headquarters: Parish Hall, La Rue de Vinchelez

Government
  - Connétable: Richard Honeycombe (Unknown)

Area
  - Total: 15 km^{2} (5.8 sq mi)
  - Rank: Ranked 1st

Population (2021)
  - Total: 4,206
  - Density: 280/km^{2} (730/sq mi)
- Time zone: GMT
  - Summer (DST): UTC+01
- Postcode format: JE3 2xx
- Website: stouen.je

St Ouen (Jèrriais: Saint Ouën, French: Saint-Ouen) is one of the twelve parishes of Jersey in the Channel Islands. It is around 8.8 kilometres (5.5 mi) north-west of St Helier. (Note: Measured from the Parish Hall to the Royal Square) It has a population of 4,097. The parish is the largest parish by surface area, covering 8,525 vergées (15 km^{2}), and is located in part on a peninsula.

The parish is largely agricultural. There is no single centre, for the church, parish hall, and school are separated; St Ouen's Village is the most significant settlement in the parish. The parish hosts the northernmost section of its namesake bay, which sweeps from the north to the south of the island.

It is a distinct parish culturally. Being the farthest from St Helier, it has many differences from the rest of the island, for example having its own dialect of Jèrriais.

Its manor, St Ouen's Manor — the seat of the de Carteret family for over eight centuries — is the senior fief in the island, and the influence of that family has also been a factor in the parish's independent-minded approach to its affairs.

== History ==
The Jersey parish system has been in place for centuries. By Norman times, the parish boundaries were firmly fixed and remain largely unchanged since.

St Ouen is named after St Ouen de Rouen (Audaenus).

In 1180 Jersey was divided by the Normans into three ministeria for administrative purposes. St Ouen was part of Crapoudoit. Crapoudoit likely refers to the stream running through St Peter's Valley.

The original parish school was St Ouen's Parochial School, next to the parish hall in the village and was originally opened in 1862 and closed in 1922. It became the St Ouen Youth and Community Centre in 1978.

The parish hall was built in 1882 by architects Hayward and Son, of Exeter. The parish memorial is located in front of the hall, which includes the names of those involved in many interesting and tragic stories. For example, Sapper Philip Luce and Edward Luce were killed in action during the First World War.

The parish church is located outside of the village in Ville de l'Eglise.

== Governance ==
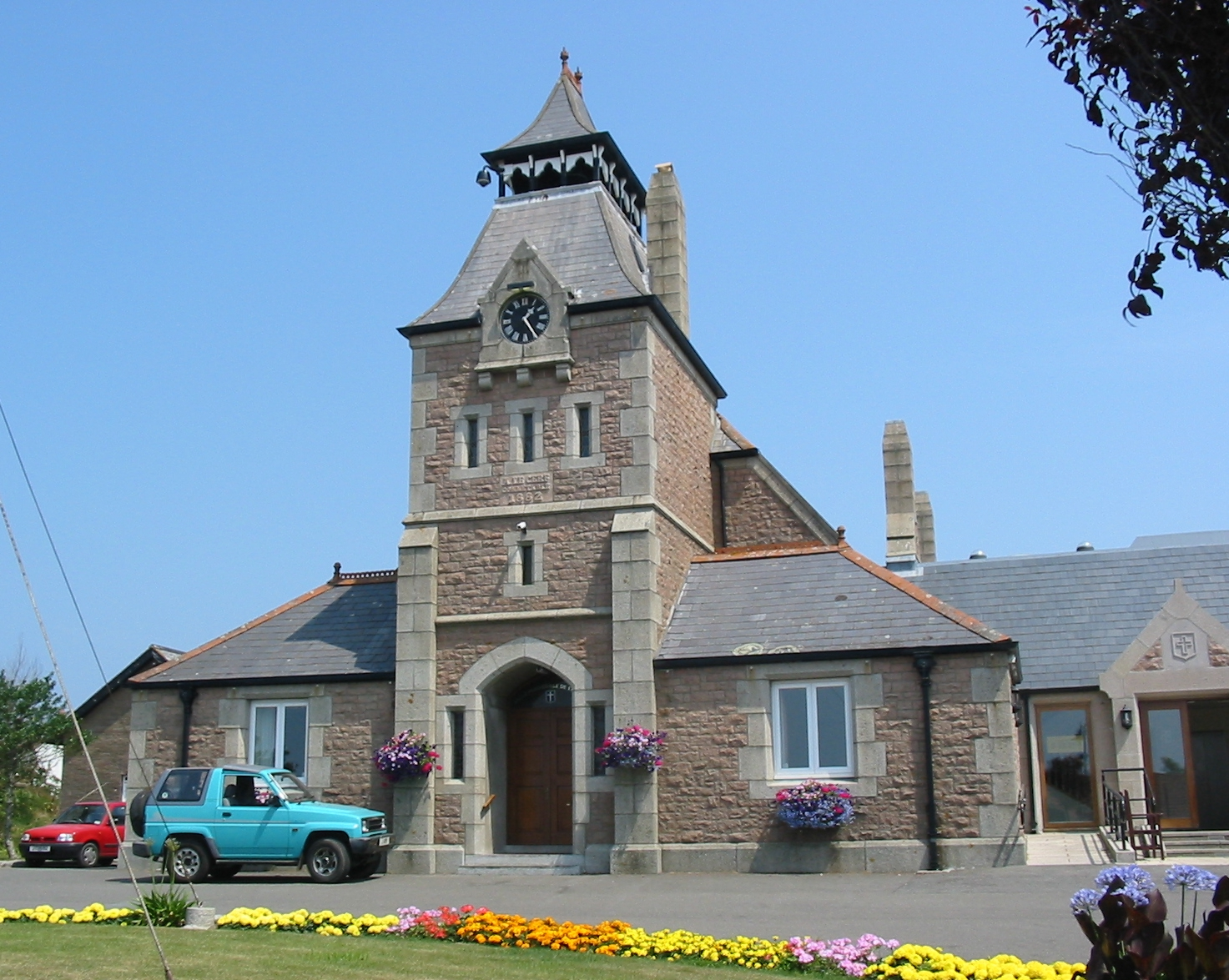
Parish Hall

The parish is a first-level administrative division of the Bailiwick of Jersey, a British Crown dependency. The highest official in the parish is the Connétable of St Ouen. The incumbent office holder is Richard Buchannan, who has held the office since 2018. The parish administration is headquartered at the Parish Hall in the village centre.

At present, the parish forms one electoral district for States Assembly elections and elects one Deputy, as well as eight Senators in an islandwide constituency. The current Deputy for St Ouen is Paul Harrison, who is the Minister for Health. Under the proposed electoral reform, it will form part of the North West electoral district consisting of St Mary, St Ouen and St Peter, which will collectively elect four representatives alongside the parishes' Connétables.

Unlike the other parishes of Jersey, the subdivisions of this parish are not named vingtaines, but cueillettes (Jèrriais: tchilliettes). Vingteniers are still elected, however, in the cueillettes.

- La Petite Cueillette
- La Grande Cueillette
- La Cueillette de Grantez
- La Cueillette de Millais
- La Cueillette de Vinchelez
- La Cueillette de Léoville

== Geography ==
St Ouen is in the north-west of the island of Jersey, part of the Channel Islands archipelago. It borders St Mary and St Peter and is located 8.5 km (5 miles) from St Helier. Part of the parish forms a peninsula known as Grosnez. The northern and western boundaries of the island are entirely coastal, with notable bays including Grève de Lecq, Plémont and St Ouen's Bay. The Val de la Mare Valley and Reservoir are located in the south of the parish, along its border with St Peter.

Grève de Lecq is shared with St Ouen. Grève is the Jèrriais word for beach. Lecq originates from the Norse La Wik, which may have meant 'ship-loading creek' or referred to witches, should the bay have been a centre of sorcery. Plémont is a headland on the parish's north coast While mont undoubtedly refers to the hill, plé could originate from a number of sources, the most likely being the French plié (folded). The name has been extended in popular speak to the neighbouring beach Grève au Lançon. Lançon (or Lanchon) is the French word for a sand-eel, due to the popularity of the bay as a site for sand-eeling at the turn of the 20th century.

The parish is mostly rural, with only 14% being built-up. The primary settlement is St Ouen's Village, located in the east of the parish, which has the parish hall, a community centre, a pub, a number of shops and a village green. The rest of the population is dispersed in small developed pockets around the rural areas of the parish. The A12 road links the parish to the airport and St Helier, and part of the Five Mile Road is also located in the parish. The parish is served by three bus routes: the numbers 8, 9 and 22/x22.

== Demography ==
Historical population
Year	Pop.	±%
1991	3,612	—
1996	3,685	+2.0%
2001	3,803	+3.2%
2011	4,097	+7.7%

== Culture ==
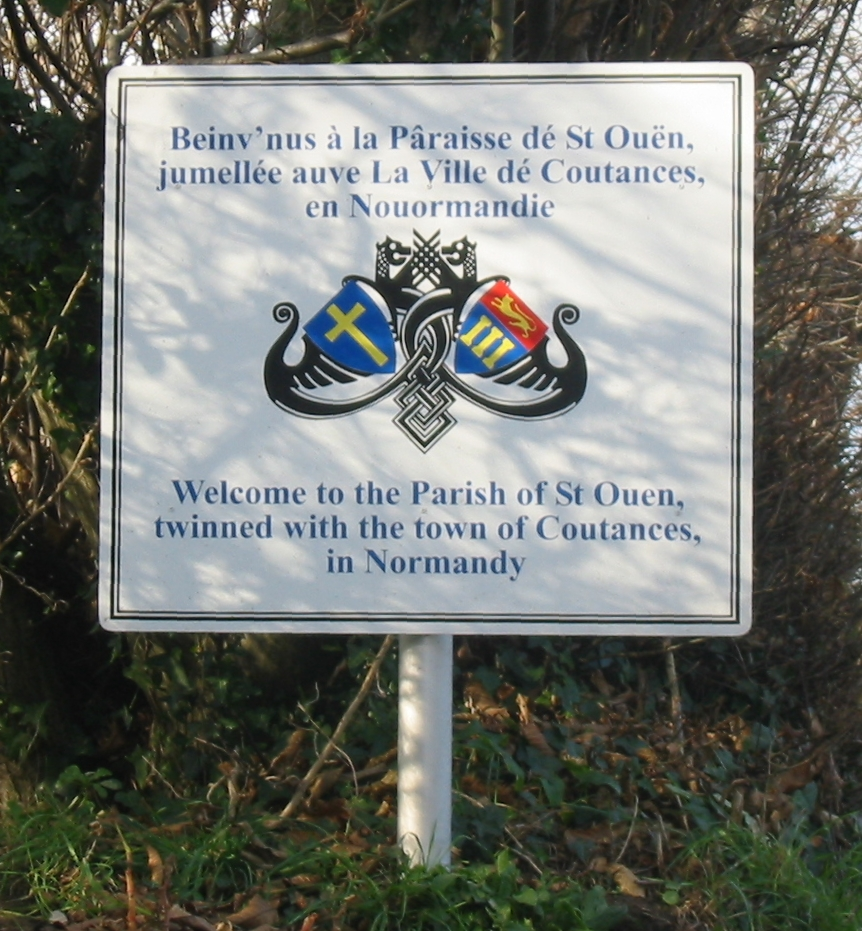
St Ouen bilingual sign

A number of the most influential writers of Jersey have been St Ouennais. George F. Le Feuvre (1891–1984), who wrote under the pseudonym "George d'la Forge", was one of the most prolific authors of Jèrriais literature of the 20th century. Frank Le Maistre (1910–2002), compiler of the Dictionnaire Jersiais-Français (1966), did much to standardise the St Ouennais dialect of Jèrriais as a literary language. Edward Le Brocq (1877–1964) wrote a weekly newspaper column from 1946 to 1964 recounting the lives and opinions of two St Ouennais characters, Ph'lip and Merrienne.

The traditional nickname for St Ouennais is Gris Ventres (grey bellies) – a reference to the custom of men from the parish to wear jerseys of undyed wool, which distinguished them from men from other parishes who generally wore blue.

== Twin towns ==
St Ouen is twinned with:

- (France) Coutances, Normandy

=== Language ===
Ouennais influence can be seen in nearby Sark. Sark was recolonised by St Ouennais. Helier de Carteret, the seigneur of the parish, received a charter from Queen Elizabeth I to colonise Sark with 40 families from the parish on condition that he maintain the island free of pirates. Sercquiais is therefore a very old offshoot of St Ouennais Jèrriais. The St Ouennais origins of Sercquiais can be seen in the 2nd and 3rd person plural forms of the preterite. Sercquiais uses an ending -dr which is typical of the St Ouennais dialect of Jèrriais, but generally not used elsewhere in Jersey (nor nowadays by younger speakers in St Ouen).

Sercquiais	Jèrriais (St Ouennais)	standard Jèrriais	English
i vuliidr	i' voulîdrent	i' voulîtent	they wanted
uu paaliidr	ou pâlîdres	ou pâlîtes	you spoke
i füüdr	i' fûdrent	i' fûtent	they were
uu prẽẽdr	ou prîndres	ou prîntes	you took

== Landmarks ==
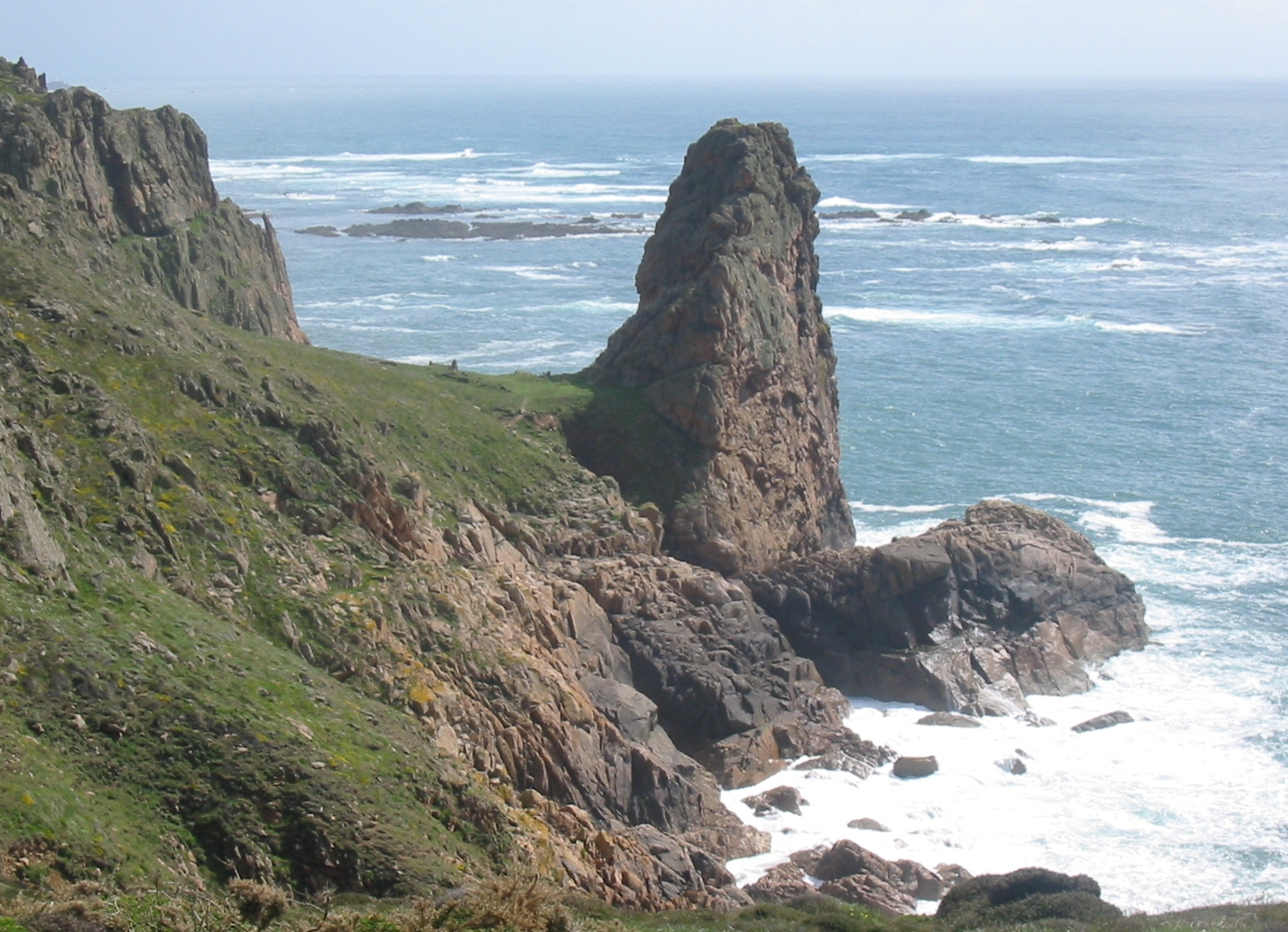
Prehistoric site of Le Pinacle

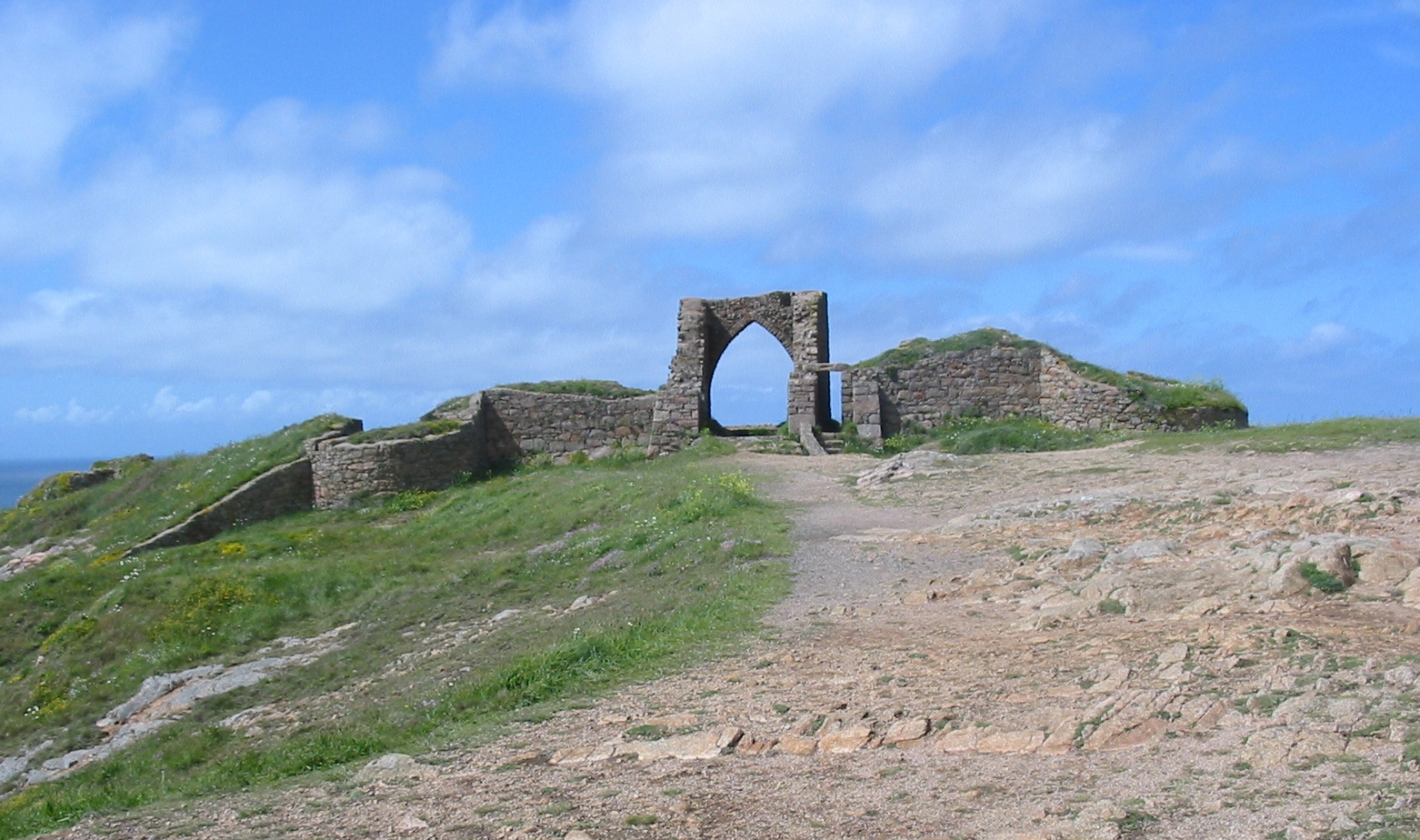
Ruins of Grosnez Castle

A number of prehistoric sites are located in St Ouen, including the Dolmen des Monts Grantez, located at Le Chemin des Monts; the Dolmen des Geonnais; and the prehistoric site at Le Pinacle, which also contains one of the very few identifiable Gallo-Roman sites to be seen in Jersey, the foundations of a fanum (small temple). Le Cotte à la Chèvre lies to the east of Grosnez and is a palaeolithic site, possibly 120,000 years old.

In the north-west, the ruins of Grosnez Castle are a landmark which also features on the Jersey 50 pence coin (see coins of the Jersey pound).

The Island's racecourse is also to be found at Les Landes.

The Val de la Mare reservoir is shared with St Peter and was created by Jersey Water in 1962. There is a walking path around the reservoir.

The parish is home to a number of manors, including: St Ouen's Manor, Vinchelez de Bas and Vinchelez de Haut. Vinchelez was originally one fief, but was split in 1606 after years of family wrangling. The Vinchelez de Bas was rebuilt in 1818.

== Places of worship ==
The parish church, dedicated to the Bishop Audoin (whose name has over time been corrupted to St Ouen), is located some distance from the parish hall, unlike in most of the parishes, and away from any centre of population. The church's patronage was given to the abbey of Mont St Michel by Philippe de Carteret. The church's oldest parts are the nave, tower and chancel, dating to the 12th or 13th century. The font, lectern and pulpit are of Caen stone and marble and date to the 1865 restoration. The bell dates to 1971. There is a custom of ringing the church bell from noon on Christmas Eve and throughout Christmas Day. The church's origins date back to before 1066. A major restoration was instigated by Canon George Clement in 1865. The coffin of Sir Philippe de Carteret, who died in the English Civil War in 1643, was found in the church in 1869.

St George's Church is located at La Ville Vautier in the north-west of the parish. It was originally sited in a chapel at Vinchelez (shared between both manors), but a dedicated church was built in 1880.

There is also a chapel at the manor house, which was restored to religious use in 1914.

In Jersey, there is an old custom of the Perquage paths. Although the real usage of these paths is unclear, some locations have been determined. St Ouen's perquage led from the church down the hillside to St Ouen's Bay, along a stream called Le Canal Vibert. St Ouen may have had two perquages, with another possible perquage leading north from the church out to Grève de Lecq via Léoville.

== Education ==
St Ouen is split into two primary school catchments, Les Landes School and St Mary's School, and one secondary school, Les Quennevais. Students can also attend islandwide schools such as Hautlieu and Victoria College. Les Landes is a Government-run primary school, located on La Rue des Cosnets.

== Sport ==
St Ouen's local football team is St Ouen F.C.

== Gallery ==
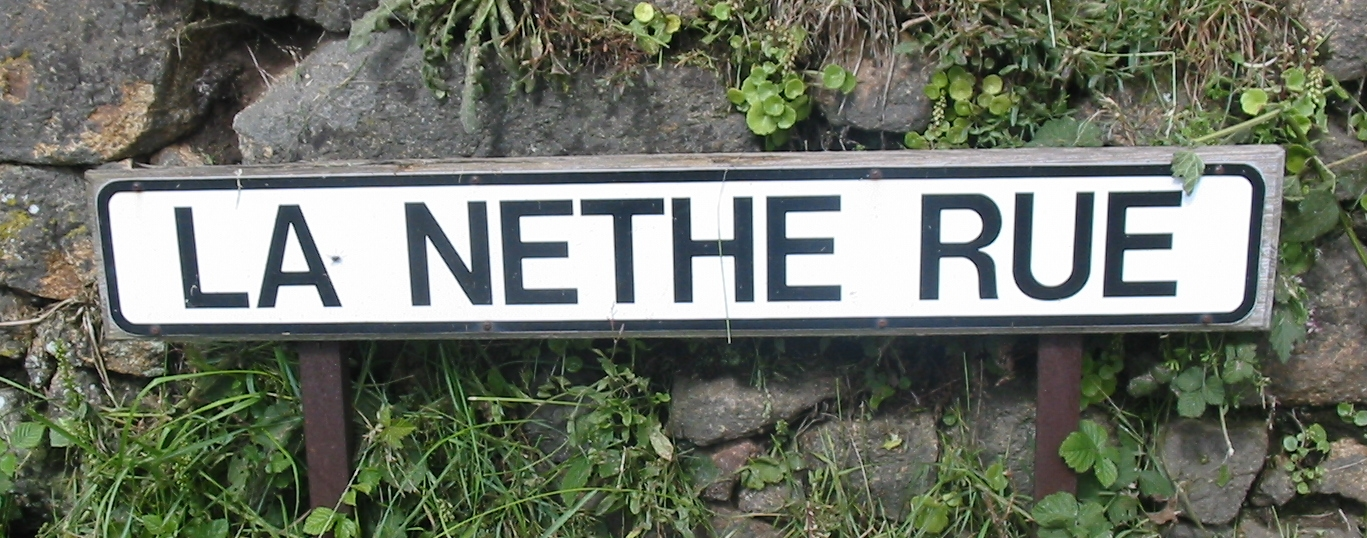
Road sign in La Néthe Rue (the black road in Jèrriais)

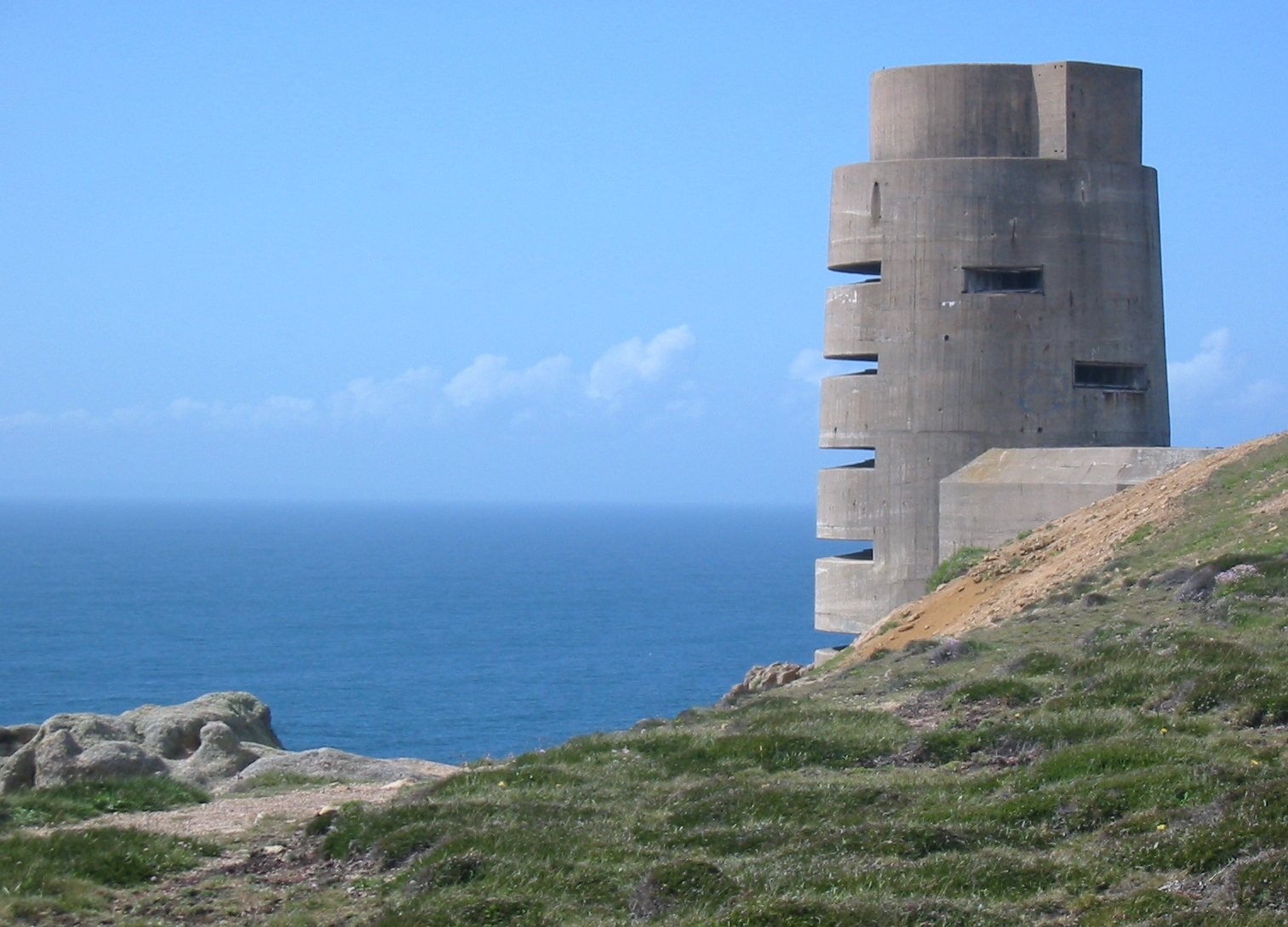
German Occupation observation tower situated at Les Landes

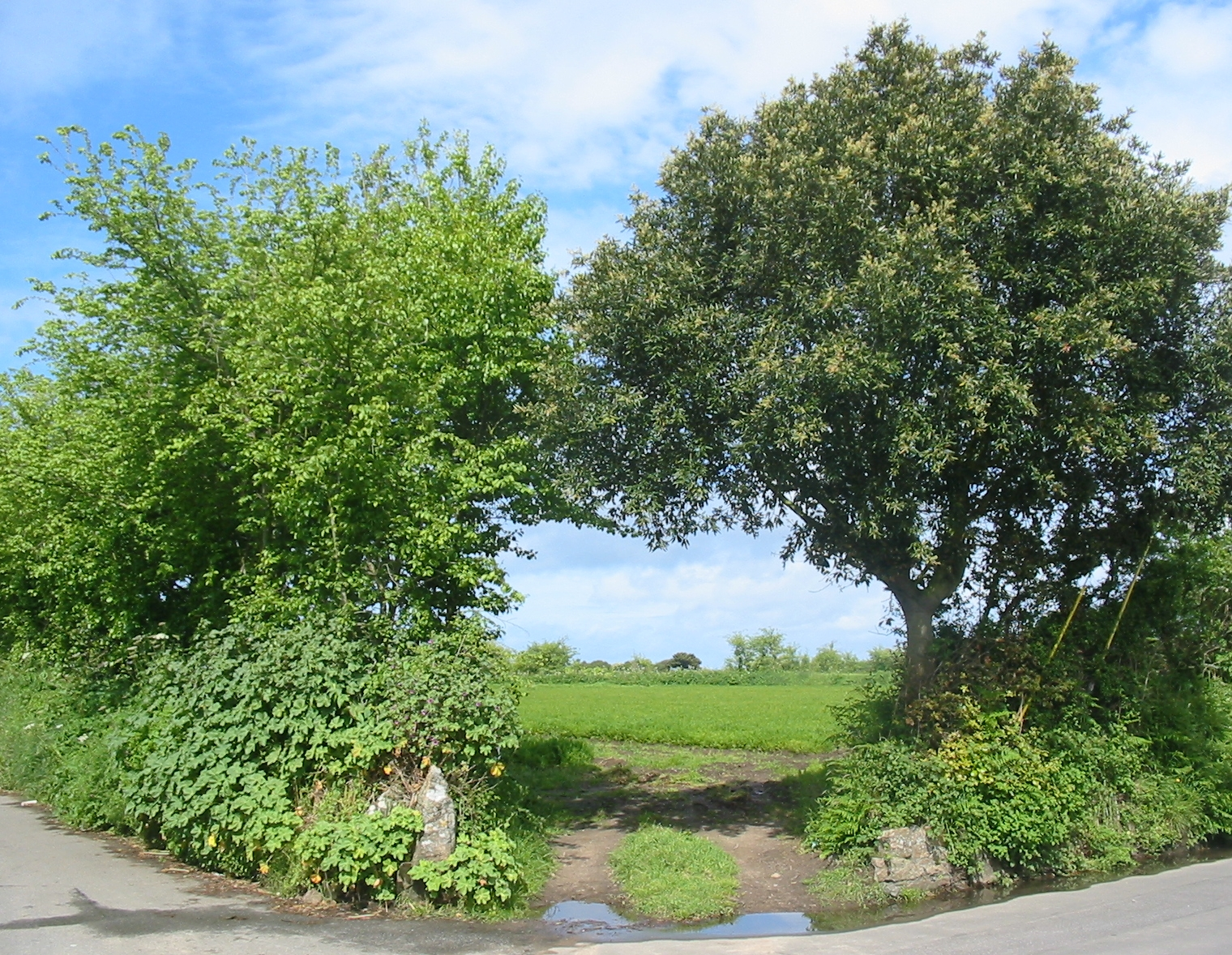
A field entrance in St. Ouen

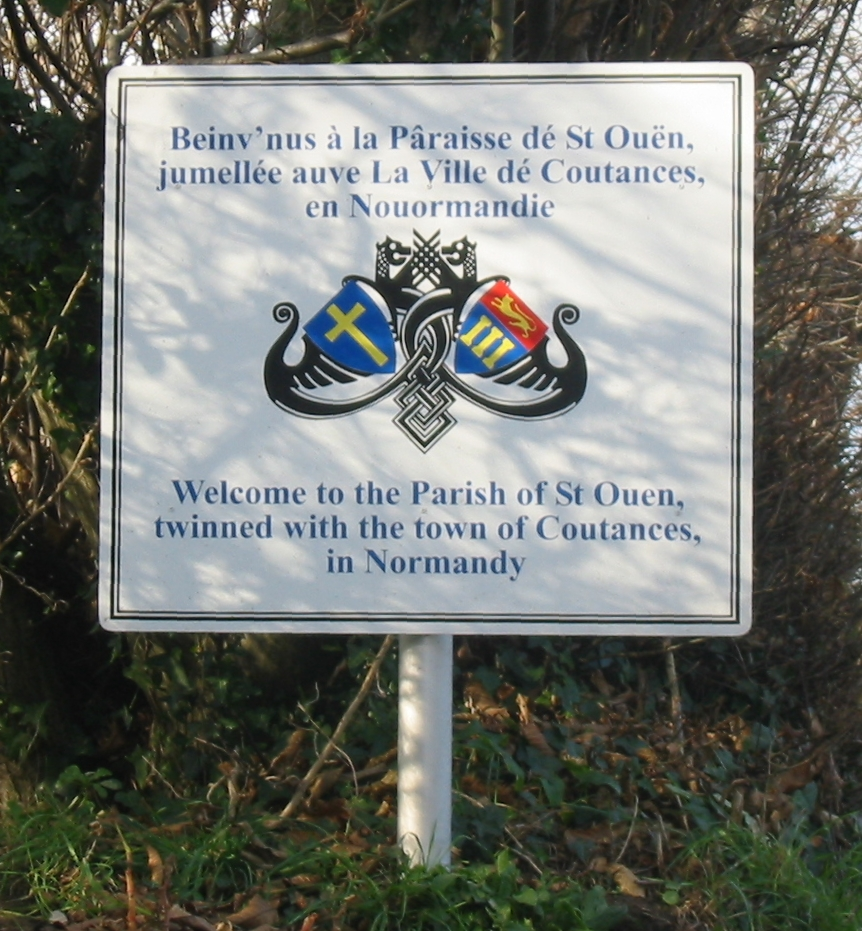
Saint Ouen bilingual sign

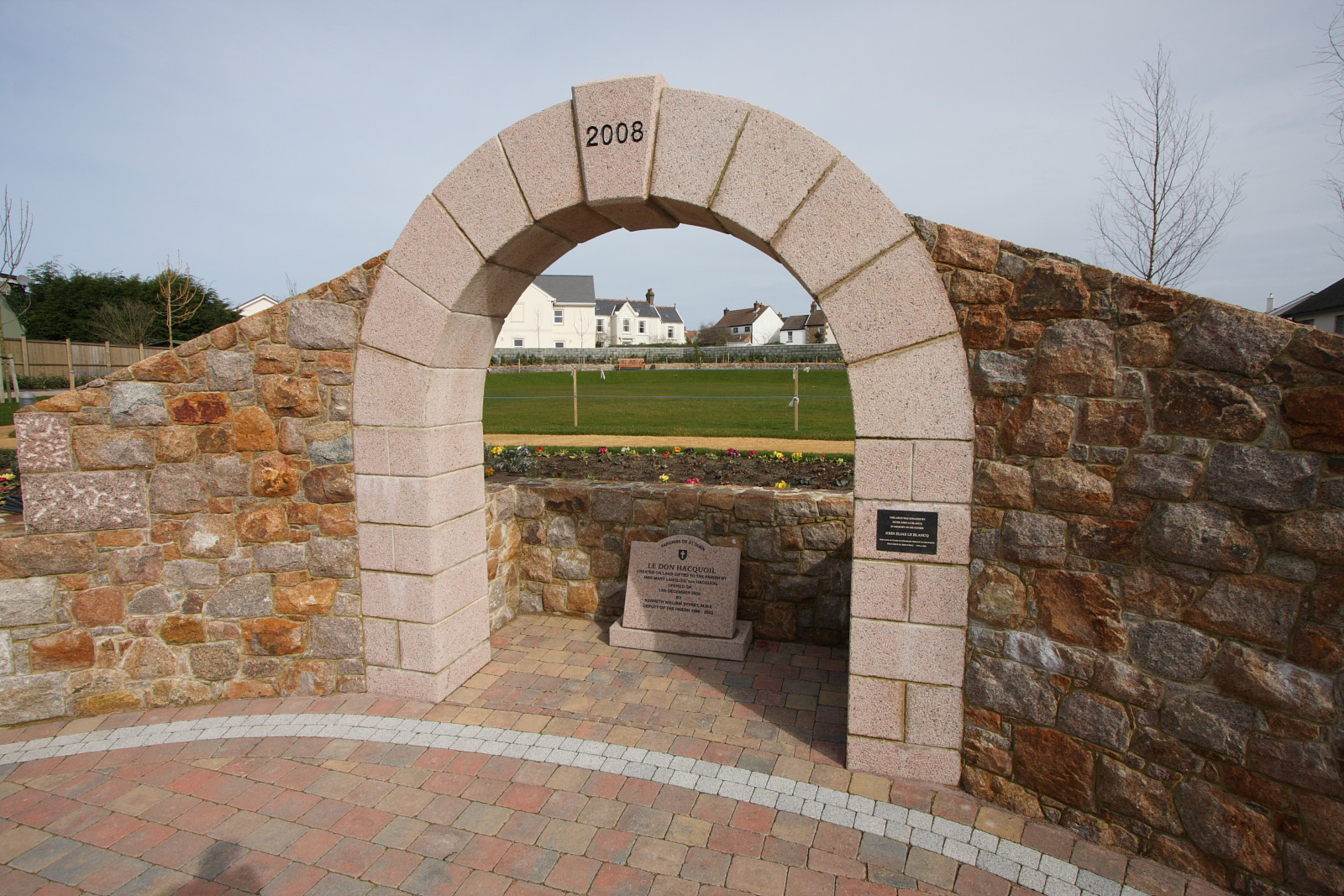
Le Don Hacquoil
