= George Paulet =

George Paulet may refer to:

- Sir George Paulet (1553–1608), English soldier, administrator, and governor of Derry
- Lord George Paulet (1803–1879), officer of the Royal Navy
- George Paulet, 12th Marquess of Winchester (1722–1800), English courtier and nobleman

== See also ==
- George Paulett (1534-1621), Jersey bailiff and temporary lieutenant-governor of Guernsey
