= Carteret baronets =

Extinct baronetcy in the Baronetage of England

There have been two baronetcies created for members of the Carteret family, both in the Baronetage of England. Both creations are extinct.

The Carteret Baronetcy, of Metesches on the Island of Jersey, was created in the Baronetage of England on 9 May 1645 for Sir George Carteret. For more information on this creation, see Earl Granville.

The Carteret Baronetcy, of St Ouen on the Island of Jersey, was created in the Baronetage of England on 4 June 1670 for Philip Carteret. He was the grandson of Sir Philip de Carteret, whose brother Helier de Carteret, Deputy Governor of Jersey, was the father of Sir George Carteret, 1st Baronet. Sir Philip's grandson, the third Baronet, was a Gentleman of the Privy Chamber to Queen Anne. The title became extinct on the third Baronet's death in 1715.

== Carteret baronets, of Metesches (1645) ==
- See Earl Granville

== Carteret baronets, of St Owen (1670) ==
- Sir Philip Carteret, 1st Baronet (died c. 1672)
- Sir Philip Carteret, 2nd Baronet (c. 1650–1693)
- Sir Charles Carteret, 3rd Baronet (1679–1715)

== See also ==
- Baron Carteret
- Carteret (name)
