= Le Pinacle (disambiguation) =

Le Pinacle may refer to:

- Le Pinacle, Coaticook, Quebec, Canada
- Le Pinacle, Frelighsburg, Quebec, Canada
- Le Pinacle in Jersey, Europe

== See also ==
- Pinnacle (disambiguation)
