= St Anne's Chapel, St Ouen's Manor =

Mediaeval chapel on Jersey

Coordinates: 49°13′34″N 2°11′55″W

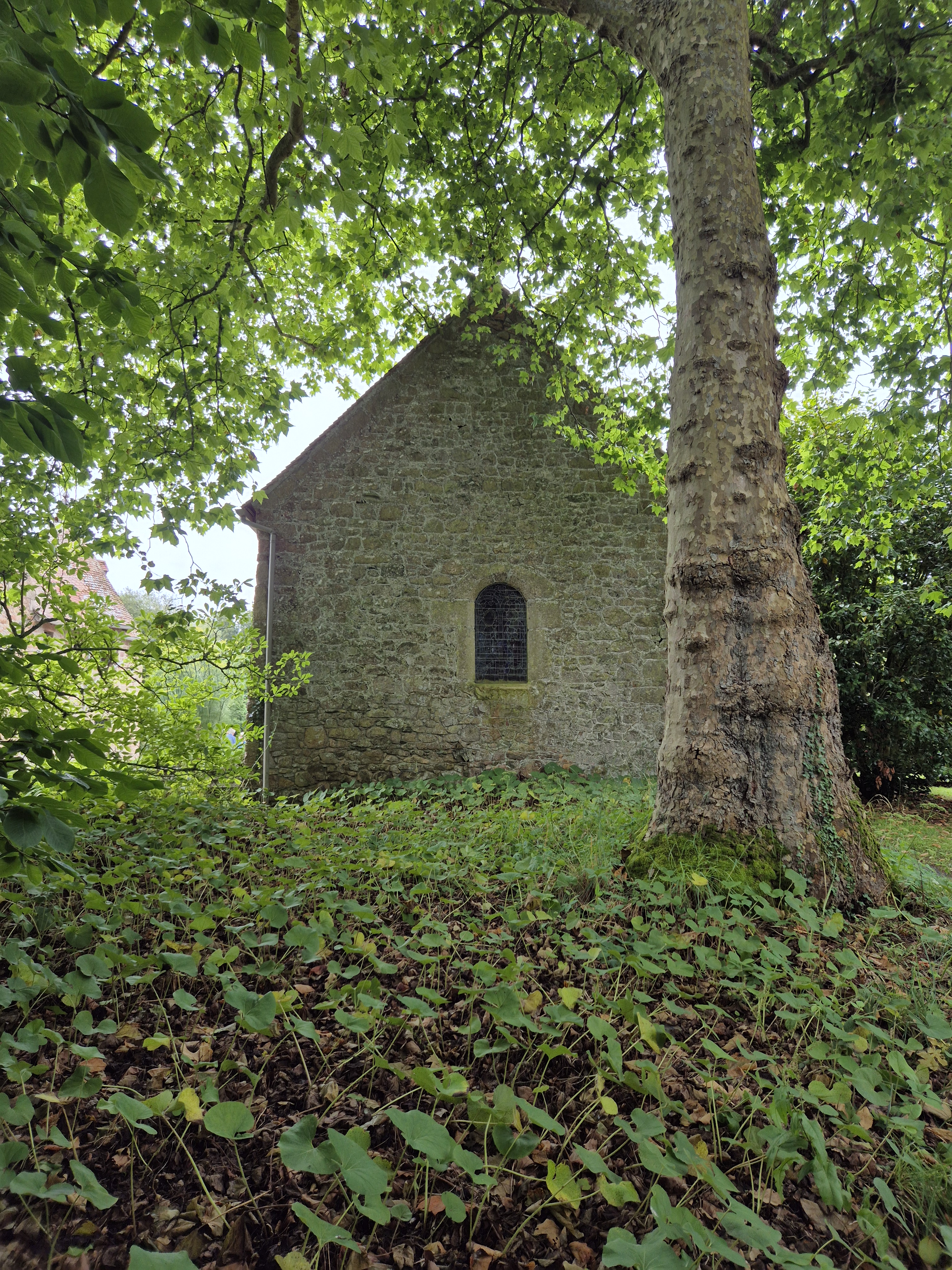
The east end of St Anne's Chapel

St Anne's Chapel is a mediaeval chapel within the grounds of St Ouen's Manor, in the parish of St Ouen on Jersey. It is dedicated to St Anne, the mother of the Virgin Mary.

== History ==
The chapel was built at the turn of the 14th century. It was deconsecrated during the Reformation in 1651 and used as a barn until 1914, when it was restored for worship and reconsecrated by the Bishop of Winchester. In the Second World War, during the German occupation of the Channel Islands, the chapel was used as a store, and it was restored after the war.

== Exterior ==
The chapel is oriented to the west and is located opposite the main lawn of the manor gardens. It is of a rectangular design with a pitched roof and is built from granite. There is a belfry at the west end; until the occupation this housed a bell that had formerly been in Milan Cathedral. However, the Germans removed it, and it has subsequently been replaced by a modern bell. The single-light arched east window has been dated to the early 16th century.

== Internal features ==
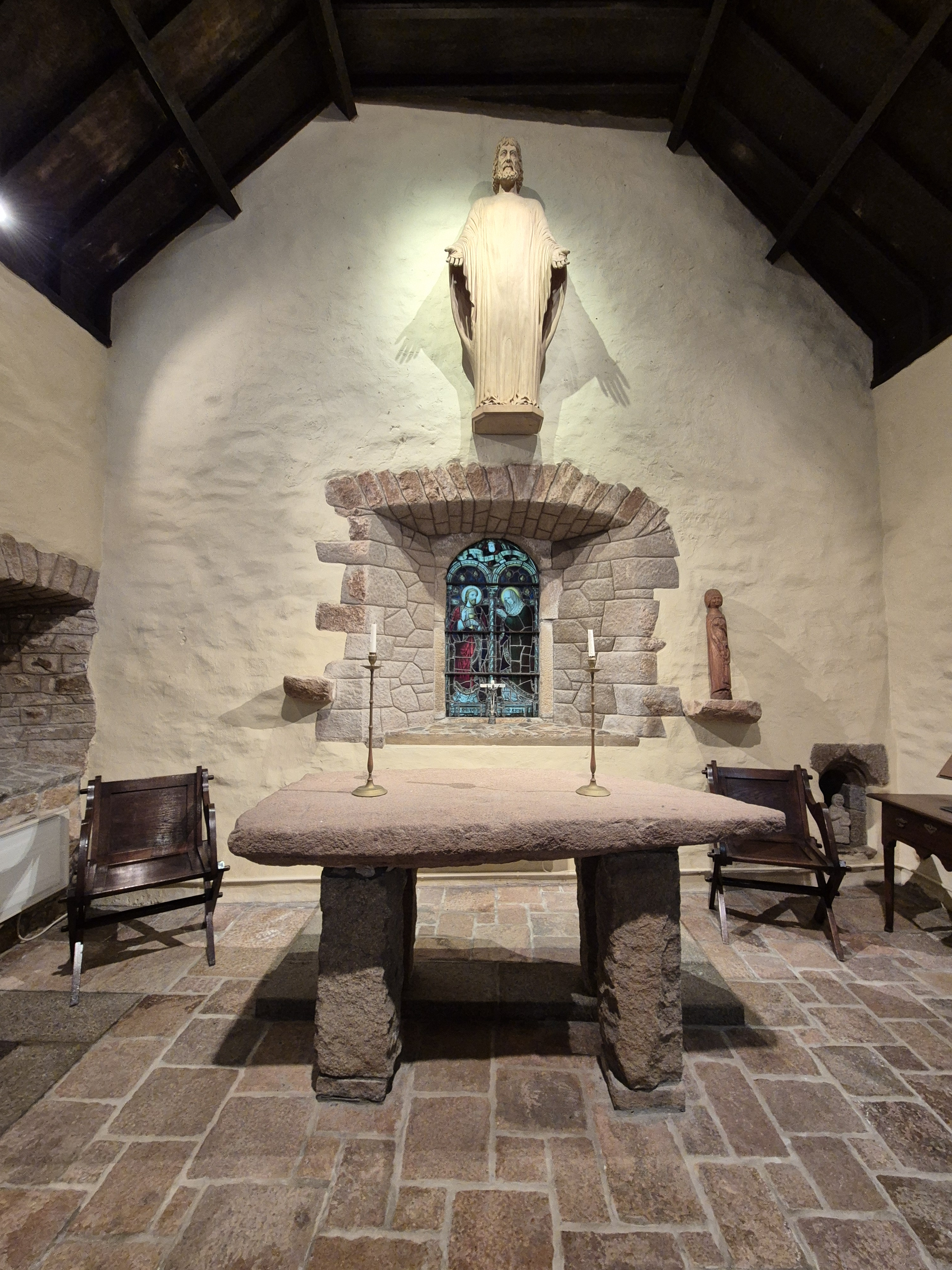
The altar and east window in St Anne's Chapel

The most notable internal fitting is the 12th-century stone altar, which was brought from the demolished St George's Chapel at Vinchelez de Bas Manor, also in St Ouen parish. There is also a stone font, of mediaeval origin.

The stained-glass windows are by Henry Bosdet, and date from 1912. They depict:

- East window: The Saviour and St Anne
- North chancel: St Anne weeping in the garden
- North wall: Joachim rejected by the high priest
- South chancel: The angel appearing to St Anne
- West window: The angel appearing to Joachim
- South wall: St Anne and Joachim meeting at the golden gate
