= Philippe de Carteret II =

Seigneur of Sark (1584–1643)

Philippe II de Carteret, 3rd Seigneur of Sark (18 February 1584 – 22 August 1643) was the son of Philippe I de Carteret (1552–1594) and Rachel Paulett (1564–1650), daughter of George Paulett (1534–1621) who was Bailiff of Jersey from 1583 to 1611, and his wife Elizabeth Perrin (1538–1615).

== Biography ==
He matriculated at the University of Oxford at an early age in 1594, the same year he succeeded his father as Seigneur of Sark. He was knighted in 1617, and became Bailiff of Jersey in 1627. He died in 1643, being succeeded in the Seigneurie by his son, Philippe 4th Seigneur of Sark.

== English Civil War ==
Carteret was a stanch Royalist during the English Civil War, especially during the Interregnum. As Lieutenant Governor of the island of Jersey he would ensure the loyalty of the population to Charles II and crack down on parliamentary sentiment from the fortress of Mont Orgueil.

When Charles II came to Jersey, Philip Carteret along with his cousin George Carteret were his escorts.

== Family ==
Carteret married Anne Dowse (1587-1664), daughter of Sir Francis Dowse (died 1649) of Nether Wallop, Hampshire and his wife Elizabeth Paulet (died before 1649) (Note: Elizabeth Paulet was a great niece of William Paulet, 1st Marquess of Winchester and a third cousin of Philippe's mother, Rachel Poulet) They had seven sons and three daughters:

- Sir Philip Carteret, 1st Baronet (c. 1620-1662), who succeeded him, and was father of Philippe de Carteret IV.
- Peyton (died September 1652), drowned with Prince Maurice.
- Zouch.
- Gideon (died 1643).
- Francis (died 1693), Attorney-General of Jersey, married Anne Seale (died c. 1704). Among their descendants were Elias Dumaresq V, Seigneur of Augres, General Sir Tomkyns Hilgrove Turner and Bodleian Librarian Bulkeley Bandinel.
- Thomas de Carteret.
- Sir Edward (died 1699).
- Elizabeth (died 1697), married her cousin, Sir George Carteret.
- Margaret.
- Anne de Carteret (died 1708), married Rev. Daniel Brevint, Dean of Lincoln (1616-1695).

== Ancestry ==
8. Edouard de Carteret, 9th Seigneur of Saint Ouen
4. Helier de Carteret, 1st Seigneur of Sark
9. Marie Sarre
2. Philippe de Carteret I, 2nd Seigneur of Sark
10. Bailiff Helier de Carteret
5. Margaret Dumaresq
11. Margaret Dumaresq
1. Philippe de Carteret II
12. Sir Hugh Paulet, Governor of Jersey
6. George Paulett
13. Philippa Pollard
3. Rachel Paulett
14. Edmund Perrin
7. Elizabeth Perrin
15. Jane Holland-Carew

== Notes ==
Legal offices
Preceded by Jean Herault	Bailiff of Jersey; 1627-1643	Succeeded by George Carteret
Regnal titles
Preceded by Philippe de Carteret I	Seigneur of Sark; 1594–1643	Succeeded by Philippe de Carteret III
