= Carteret =

Carteret is a location in Normandy, France, and most if not all uses derive from there. Carteret may refer to:

== Places ==
- Carteret, New Jersey, a borough in Middlesex County, New Jersey, U.S.A., named after George Carteret
  - Carteret High School, a four-year comprehensive public high school, the lone secondary school in Carteret School District
  - Carteret School District, a comprehensive community public school district in Carteret, New Jersey
  - West Carteret, New Jersey, an unincorporated community located within Carteret, New Jersey
  - Yeshiva Gedola of Carteret, a Jewish institution based in Carteret, New Jersey
- Carteret, Normandy, a former commune, since 1964 part of Barneville-Carteret, Normandy, France
  - Cape Carteret, Normandy, a peninsula near Carteret, Normandy
    - Carteret Lighthouse, located on Cape Carteret, Normandy
- Carteret County, North Carolina, named after either George Carteret or John Carteret, 2nd Earl Granville
  - Cape Carteret, North Carolina, a town within Carteret County
  - Carteret Community College, a community college within Carteret County
  - Carteret County Home, a historic poorhouse located at Beaufort, Carteret County, North Carolina
  - Carteret County News-Times, a newspaper based in Carteret County
  - Carteret County Public Schools, a PK–12 graded school district serving Carteret County
  - Carteret General Hospital, Morehead City, North Carolina
  - National Register of Historic Places listings in Carteret County, North Carolina
  - West Carteret High School, a public secondary school located in Morehead City, North Carolina
- Carteret County, a former county in South Carolina 1684–1708; see List of former United States counties
- Carteret Islands, Papua New Guinea, named after Philip Carteret

== People ==
- Carteret (name)

== Other uses ==
- USS Carteret (APA-70) (1944–46), a Gilliam-class attack transport which served with the U.S. Navy during World War II, named after Carteret County, North Carolina

== See also ==
- Barneville-Carteret, a commune in Normandy, France which includes the former commune of Carteret, Normandy
  - Canton of Barneville-Carteret, a former canton based on Barneville-Carteret
- La Mare de Carteret School, a post-11 secondary school on the island of Guernsey in the Channel Islands
