= Le Pinacle =

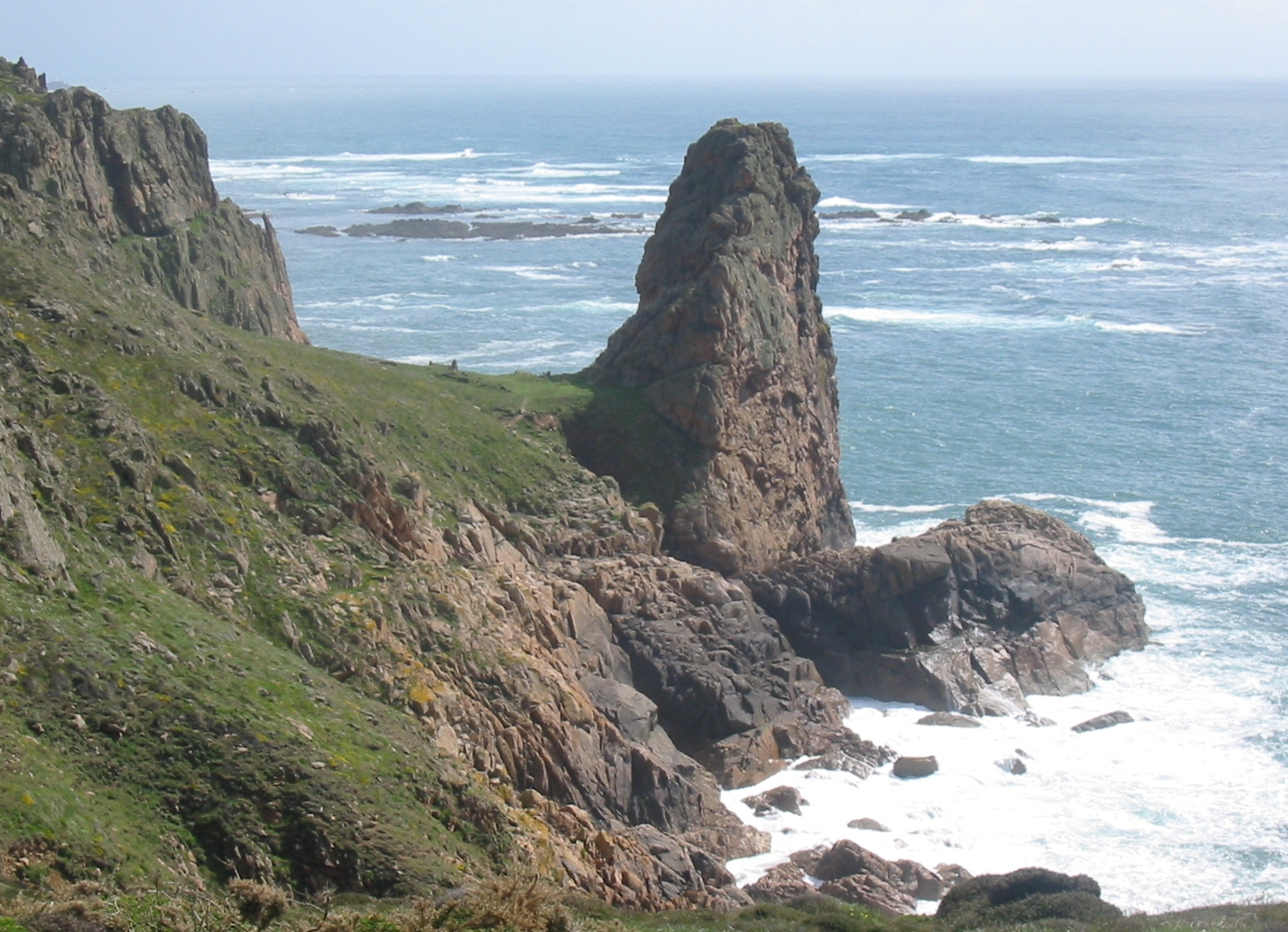
- Interactive map of Le Pinacle
- 49.2476°N 2.2530°W
- Periods: Neolithic–Roman
- Location: Saint Ouen, Jersey
- Region: Channel Islands

Site notes
- Public access: Yes

Le Pinacle is a protruding pinnacle of rock, at the coastal edge of a Les Landes in the north-west of Jersey, with remains and ruins at its base dating from five periods including the Neolithic and Chalcolithic periods, the Bronze Age, and the Iron Age. There is also evidence of a rectangular Gallo-Roman temple.

== Dolerite ==
The dolerite stratum has been mined, and used to make axe heads during the Neolithic period and Bronze Age.

== Megalith ==
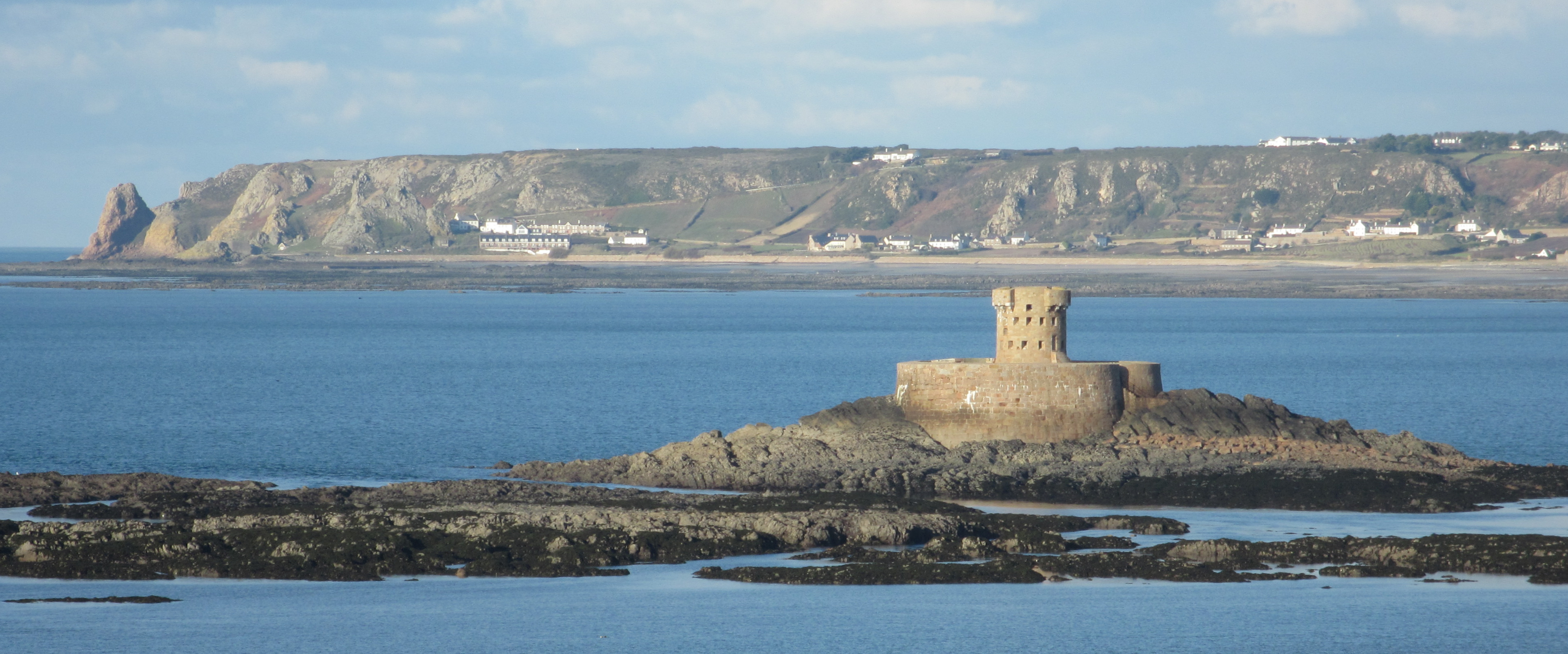
Le Pinacle is visible in the distance (far left)

The megalithic rock is a natural formation, and a prominent landmark which can be seen from St Ouen's bay.

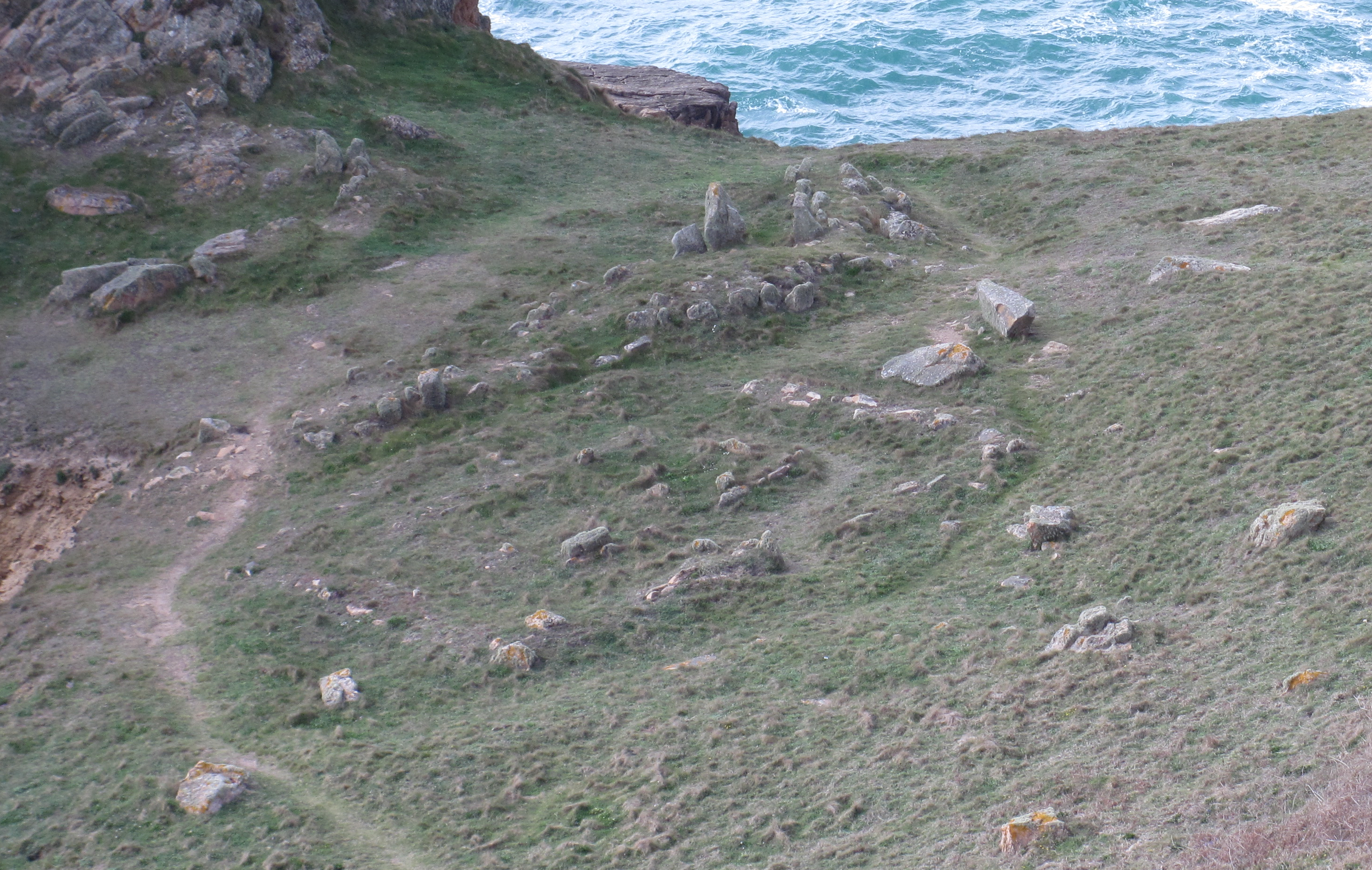
The remains of the Roman temple can be seen in this photo

== See also ==
- Jersey dolmens
