= Perquage =

Series of routes in Jersey, Channel Islands

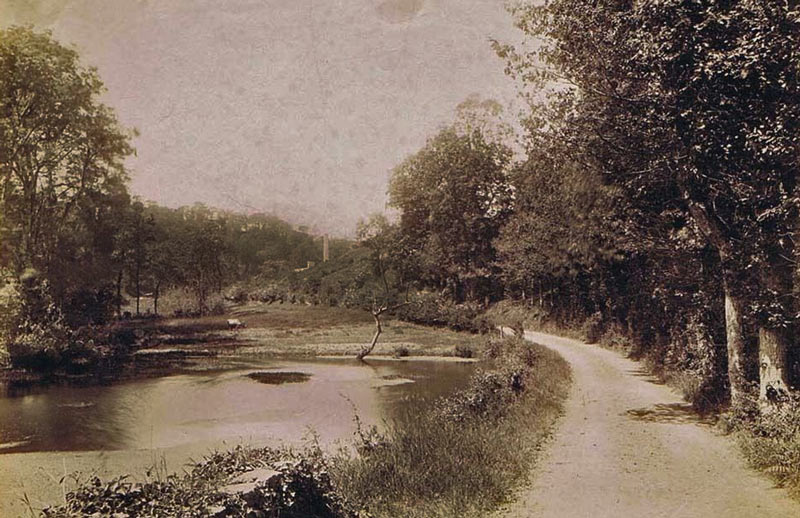
St Peter's Valley in 1890

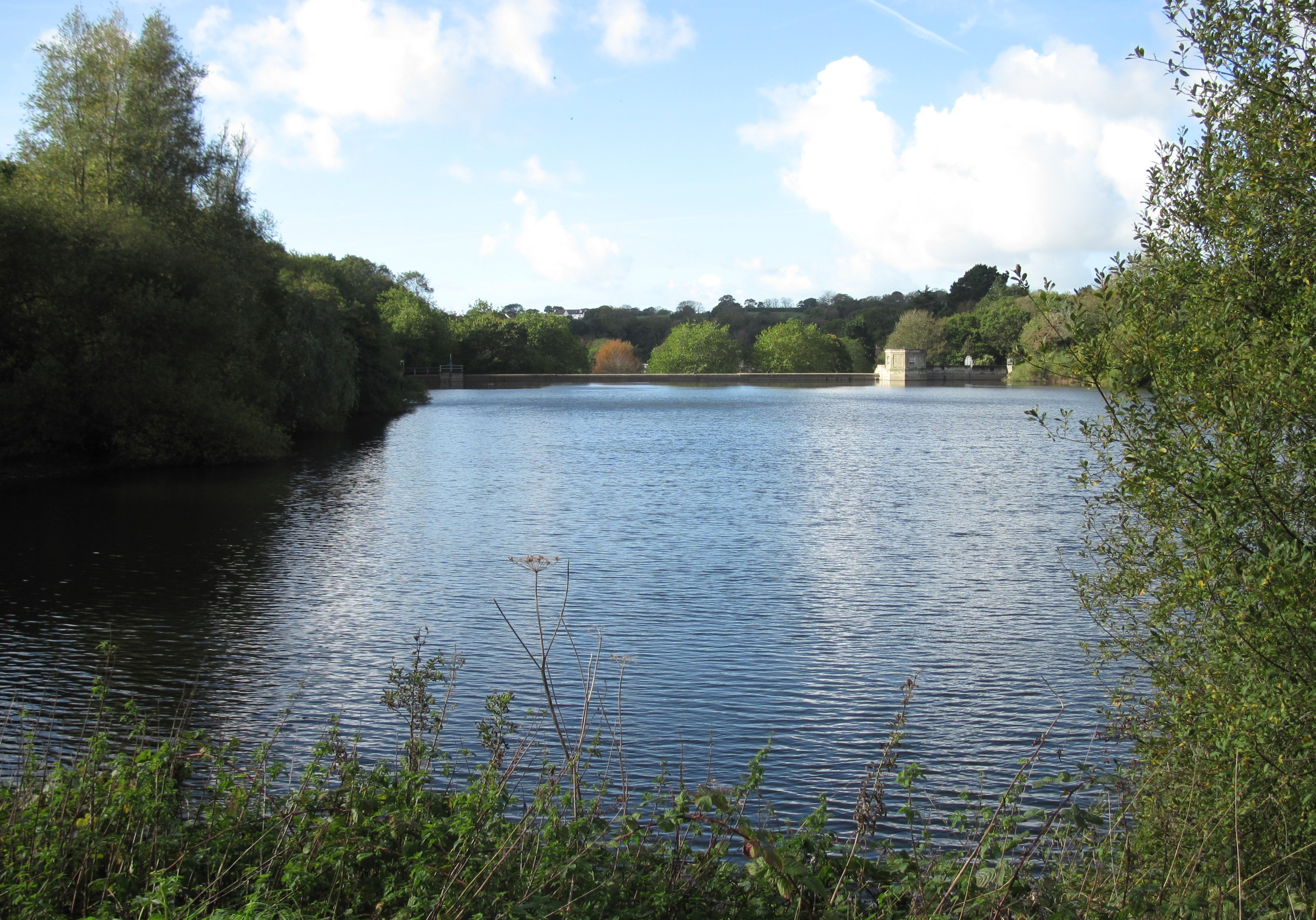
Grands Vaux is one of the routes

The perquages are a series of routes in Jersey, Channel Islands. Some claim the routes that offered sanctuary to malefactors to leave the island. All except St Ouen and St Martin lead to the south coast. For example, St Mary, St John and St Lawrence leave via St Peter's Valley and Beaumont (today a cycle track leading to the south coast).

The full list of the perquages are:

- St. Clement
- St. Catherine's Valley
- Grève de Lecq Valley (Mont du Grève de Lecq)
- Le Marais du Val
- Les Vaux
- Saint Peter's Valley
- Les Grands Vaux / La Vallée des Vaux

== Use ==
In Caesarea, Jean Poingdestre states the perquages were 24-feet wide highways beginning at the parish churches and leading to the sea. The only known use of them was the conduct of those who had taken sanctuary. However, elsewhere he considers that to be false. Instead he considers that the roads were for public use such as army manoeuvres.
