= Nicolas Henri Carteret =

French lawyer and politician

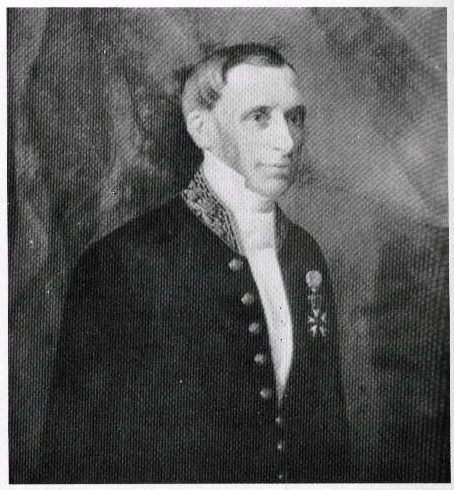
- Born: 7 November 1807; Châtillon-sur-Seine, Côte-d'Or, France
- Died: 29 January 1862 (aged 54); Paris, France
- Occupation: Politician

Nicolas Henri Carteret (7 November 1807 – 29 January 1862) was a French lawyer and politician.

== Early years ==
Nicolas Henri Carteret was born at Châtillon-sur-Seine, Côte-d'Or, on 7 November 1807. His parents were Nicolas Carteret (1766–1811) and Thérèse Boisseau (1785–1811). He was a notary in Reims from 1834 to 1844. In 1835 he married Adrienne Thoré (1813–1839). They had two children, Marie Henriette Carteret (1837–1862) and Henri Carteret (1839–1878).

== Political career ==
Carteret was elected to the municipal council of Reims in 1840, and reelected in 1842. He was Mayor of Reims from 1845 to 1848. In 1848 he was appointed Secretary of State for the Interior in the Executive Commission. On 13 May 1849 Carteret was elected Representative for Marne in the Legislative Assembly. He sat with the majority and supported the coup d'État of Louis-Napoléon Bonaparte. Under the Second French Empire he was elected as Representative for the 3rd district of Marne on 22 June 1857. He was the official government candidate. He sat with the dynastic majority until his death, and in 1858 voted for the law of general security.

Carteret was also a general councilor of Reims, and the founder of the Reims agricultural exhibition. He was made an officer of the Legion of Honour. He died in Paris on 29 January 1862. He is buried in the Cimetière du Nord in Reims. A street in Reims in named after him.
