= Sir Renaud de Carteret, 8th Seigneur of Saint Ouen =

Sir Renaud (Reginald) de Carteret, 8th Seigneur of Saint Ouen (1316–1382) was a Seigneur of Saint Ouen in Jersey.

He followed his father as Seigneur of St Ouen in 1327. Succeeded to the command of the military forces in Jersey when the Governor Dru de Barentin was slain.

Edward III's pursuit of the French Crown brought war with France in its train, and the islands were again drawn into the conflict.

Sir Renaud successfully repelled the attacks of Nicolas Béhuchet, Admiral of France in 1338. In 1339 and 1340 more attacks were repulsed again under his command.

The French had captured Guernsey and held it for three years. They attempted to capture Jersey, but failed to take Mont Orgueil.

Sir Renaud led a Jersey fleet, assisted by the English, to regain Guernsey in 1356 and helped to drive out the French from that island. During this battle many notable Jerseymen lost their lives, but because a prominent Guernseyman, William Le Feyvre, was executed for treason by the Jerseymen, a bitter interinsular feud broke out between the islands.

A trial ensued, when the angry widow stated that her husband had been done to death, "out of ancient enmity and their own malice", and the Jerseymen implicated were banished. Sir Renaud de Carteret and Ralph Lempriere, who had been leaders in the siege, challenged the verdict and were imprisoned in Castle Cornet, where they had a hard time at the hands of the Guernseymen until released by the King's pardon.

== Ancestry ==
Ancestors of Renaud V de Carteret, Seigneur of Saint Ouen

16. Sir Philippe de Carteret, 3rd Seigneur of Saint Ouen
8.Sir Renaud de Carteret, 4th Seigneur of Saint Ouen
17. Margaret d'Aubigny
4. Sir Philipe de Carteret 5th Seigneur of Saint Ouen
2. Sir Reginald de Carteret, 6th Seigneur of Saint Ouen
1. Renaud de Carteret, 8th Seigneur of Saint Ouen
3. Genette Le Guerpil

== See also ==
- Other members of the dynasty: Renaud de Carteret I and Renaud de Carteret III
