= Ingleby, Lincolnshire =

Hamlet in Lincolnshire, England

Coordinates: 53.283463°N 0.662398°W

Ingleby
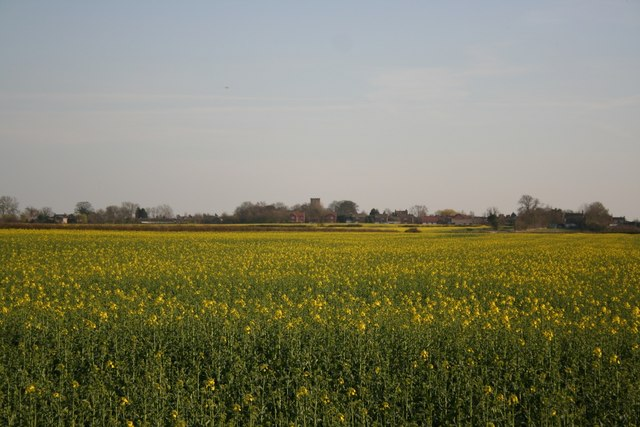
- View to Saxilby from Ingleby

- Location within Lincolnshire
- OS grid reference: SK892771
  - London: 125 mi (201 km) S
- Civil parish: Saxilby with Ingleby
- District: West Lindsey
- Shire county: Lincolnshire
- Region: East Midlands
- Country: England
- Sovereign state: United Kingdom
- Post town: Lincoln
- Postcode district: LN1
- Police: Lincolnshire
- Fire: Lincolnshire
- Ambulance: East Midlands
- UK Parliament: Gainsborough

Ingleby is a hamlet in the civil parish of Saxilby with Ingleby, in the West Lindsey district of Lincolnshire, England. It is situated less than 1 mile (1.6 km) north from the village of Saxilby, and 6 miles (10 km) north-west of Lincoln.

Ingleby comprised three areas, North Ingleby, South Ingleby and Low Ingleby.

Ingleby is recorded three times as "Englebi" in the Domesday Book; in 1086 it comprised 38 households, which for the time was considered very large.

In North Ingleby there are earthworks of a scheduled manor complex centred on a moated enclosure now occupied by Ingleby Hall Farm. Documents in 1569–70 record a Deer Park in the area. It is also believed there was a church or chapel here – Saxilby church has a list of incumbents for Ingleby church – dating from 1086 to 1416.

At South Ingleby there are earthworks for another manor, an island refuge contained within a moat, on the site of Ingleby Grange.
