= Renaud de Carteret, Baron of Carteret and Lord of Saint Ouen =

Sir Renaud, (Reginald), de Carteret, Seigneur of Carteret., (1063–1125) is first found in a charter, dated 1125, from the Abbey of Mont Saint-Michel. He went on the First Crusade, 1096-99, with Robert Curthose, Duke of Normandy.

In the archives of Saint-Lô exists a charter, dating from the First Crusade, on which is found the seal of Renaud de Carteret. This seal shows that, during the latter part of the twelfth century, the de Carterets discarded their non-heraldic "equestrian" seal, and took into use the following arms:

Blazon of Gules, en Fess Three Fusier Argent, Etiqueter Azure. (Red Shield, a Horizontal Stripe with Three Silver Lozenges (fusils) with a Blue Label).

The Etiqueter Azure, or blue label, is a device of cadency (brisure) used by a first son. A label is removed on the death of the father, and the son inherits the plain coat. This proves that his father was still alive in 1099.

Renaud is accredited with taking the Jersey parish of Saint Ouen by the sword and founding the Saint Ouen's Manor.

== See also ==
- Other members of the dynasty: Renaud de Carteret III and Renaud de Carteret V
