= George William de Carteret =

Norman language journalist and writer from Jersey

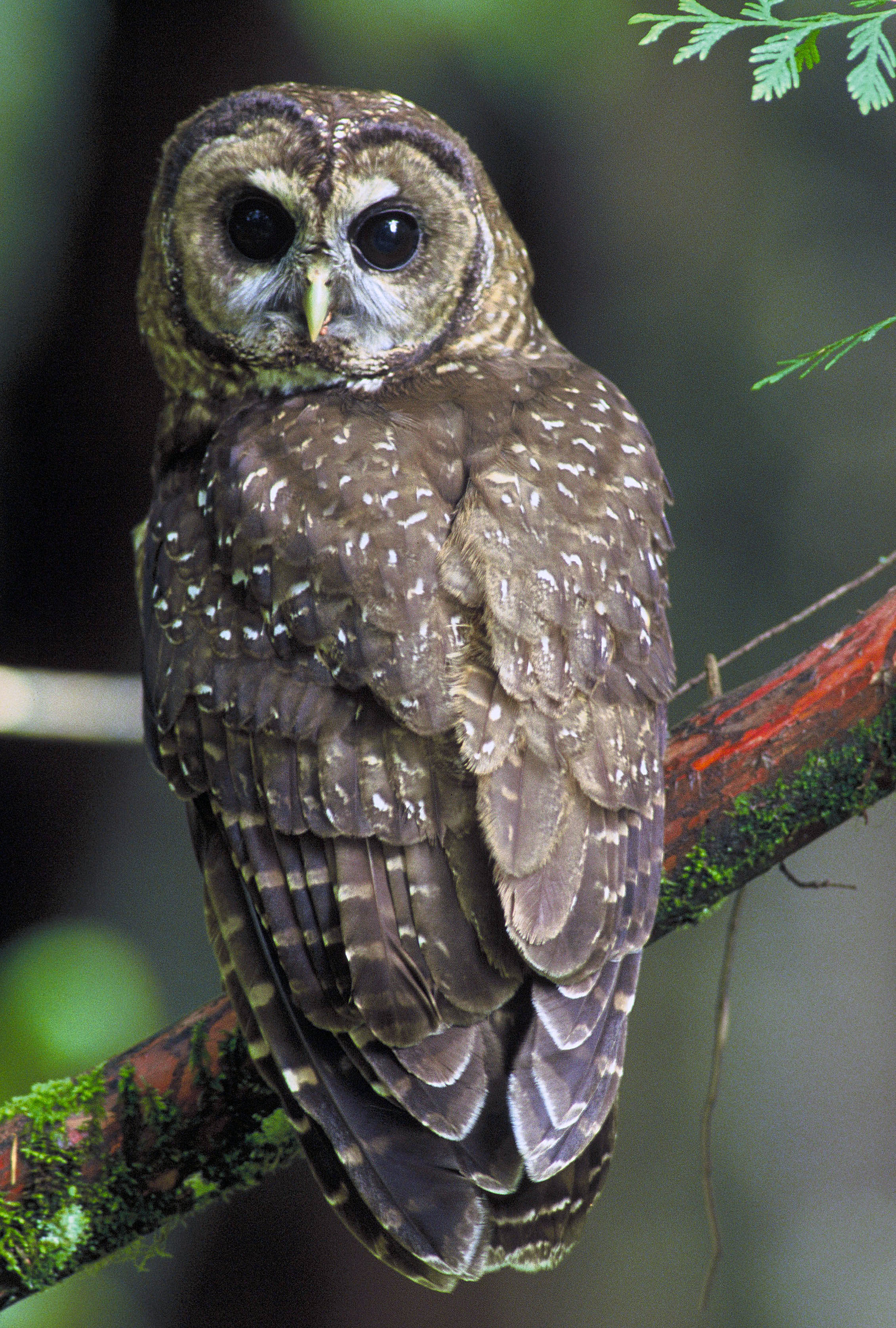
An owl, Carteret's bird of choice for a "personality" for his pieces

George William de Carteret (1869 St Peter, Jersey - 4 September 1940) was a Norman language journalist and writer from Jersey.

Working as a farmer in St Peter, George William de Carteret wrote, under the nom de plume Le Caouain (the owl), a great number of articles each Saturday for Les Chroniques de Jersey. Le Caouain purportedly lived with his wife, Marie Hibou in the attic of the printshop and flew round the parish halls reporting on parochial politics.

G. W. de Carteret also wrote under the nom de plume of G.W. de C.. Although the bulk of his writings were in prose, he wrote some poems for the Eisteddfod as well as theatrical dialogues for performance.

He was secretary of the Jersey Farmers Union.

== See also ==
- De Carteret family

== Bibliography ==
- La Grève de Lecq, Roger Jean Lebarbenchon, 1988 ISBN 2-905385-13-8 (in French)
