= Philip de Carteret, 11th Seigneur of St Ouen =

Eighth Seigneur of Saint Ouen

Philip de Carteret (died 1500) was the eighth Seigneur of Saint Ouen. The son of Philip, he married Margaret Harliston in 1470 and had 21 children.

According to a biased non-contemporary account of Baker's governorship, Philip de Carteret opposed the alleged cruelty of the rule of Matthew Baker as Governor of Jersey, who had been appointed with vice-regal Powers in all but name. It was alleged that Baker conceived a plot to implicate de Carteret as a traitor, using a letter purportedly written by de Carteret to the Normans. De Carteret was imprisoned in Mont Orgueil to await trial by combat. According to a chronicle of events, – written by a member of the de Carteret family some 70 years later – his wife Margaret, who had only recently given birth, secretly took a boat to the English mainland to convince King Henry VII of her husband's innocence. He was freed and his lands and chattels returned to him, and Baker was later recalled from office. Henry VII was not absolutely convinced of de Carteret's loyalty, however, and placed him under a Bond of £1,000 as surety for his future good conduct.

== Ancestry ==
Ancestors of Philip de Carteret, Seigneur of St Ouen

16. Sir Reginald de Carteret, Seigneur of Saint Ouen
8. Sir Reginald de Carteret, Seigneur of Saint Ouen and Longueville
17. Jeanette de St Martin
4. Sir Philippe de Carteret, Seigneur of St Ouen
9. Perrinne Marechal
2. Sir Philippe de Carteret
10. Sir William Newton
5. Margaret Newton
1. Philip de Carteret, Seigneur of St Ouen
Penna de Caux
Perrine de Caux

== Sources ==
- Blanche B. Elliott (1923). Jersey: An Isle of Romance.
- William A. Shaw, "Knights of England", pub. 1971.
- Exchequer Rolls, Close Rolls, Parliament Rolls, – for Edward IV, Richard III, and Henry VII, – National Archives, Kew.
- "Materials for a History of the Reign of Henry VII", Ed: J. Campbell, 2 Vols., Rolls Series; Pub: 1873 onwards, by the Treasury for the Master of the Rolls.
- "Les Memoires de Georges d'Amboise, Cardinal et Ministre d'Etat"; Colonel Etienne Thierry, Pub: Paris, 1853. Monograph.
- Richard Foxe in Venn, J. & J. A., Alumni Cantabrigienses, Cambridge University Press, 10 vols, 1922–1958
- "Henry VII", S.B. Chrimes, First Pub: Eyre Methuen Ltd., 1972; new Edn. Yale University Press, 1999.
