= Philip d'Aubigny =

Knight and royal councillor (d. 1236)

- Coat of arms: Arms of Daubeney; Gules, four fusils conjoined in fess argent
- Born: c. 1166; Ingleby, Lincolnshire
- Died: c. 1236; Kingdom of Jerusalem
- Buried: Jerusalem
- Noble family: D'Aubigny
- Father: Ralph d'Aubigny
- Mother: Sybil Valoignes

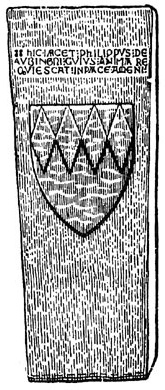
Drawing of ledger stone of Philip d'Aubigny, Church of the Holy Sepulchre, Jerusalem, displaying his arms and inscribed in Latin Hic jacet Philippus de Aubingni cuius anima requiescat in pace Amen ("Here lies Philip d'Aubigny, may his soul rest in peace, Amen")

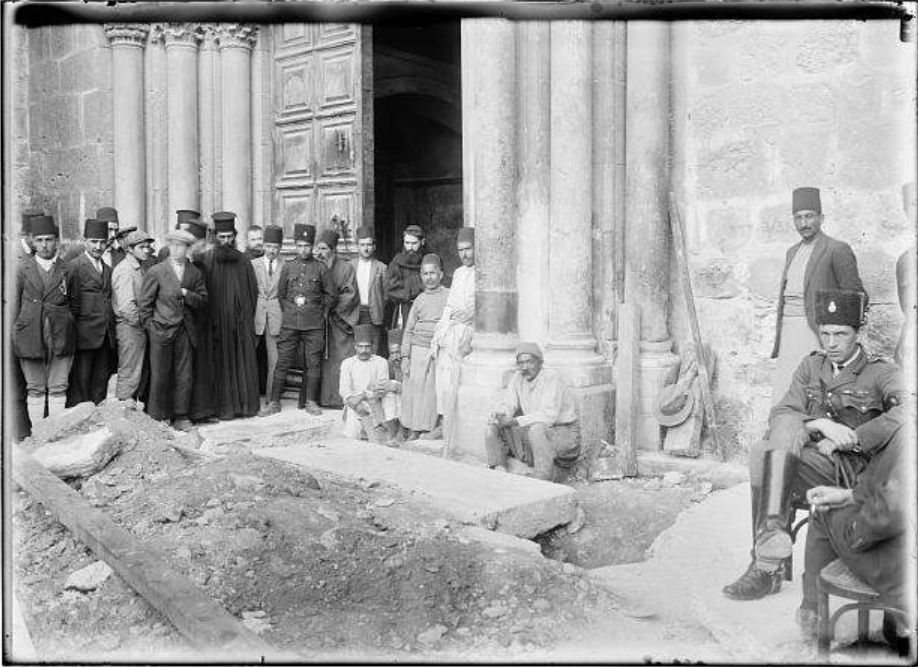
Ledger stone of Philip d'Aubigny, Church of the Holy Sepulchre, Jerusalem, at start of operation to lower it to a position safe from wear by footfall

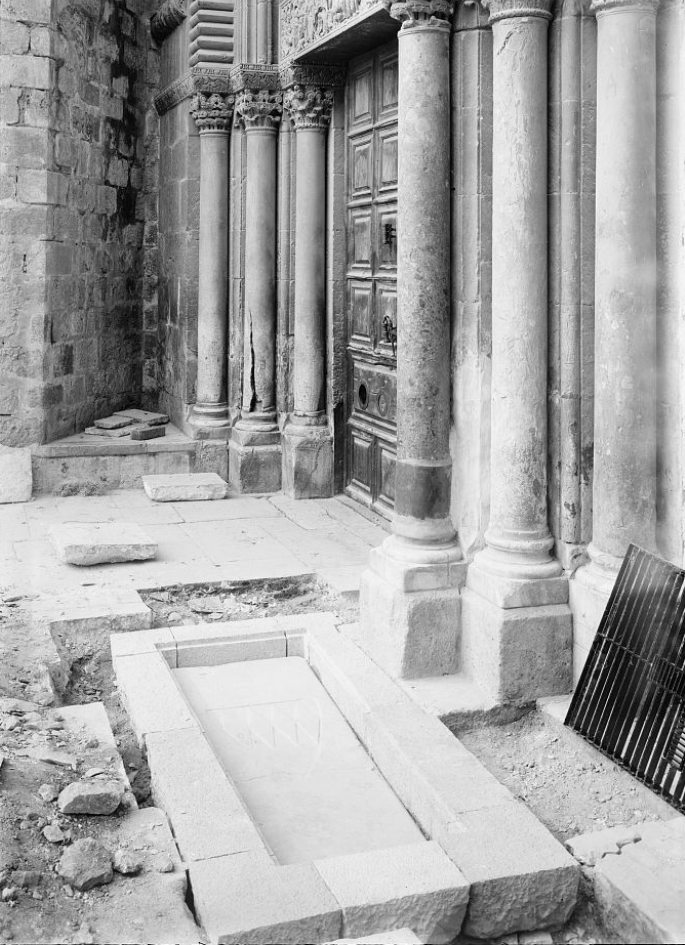
Ledger stone of Philip d'Aubigny, Church of the Holy Sepulchre, Jerusalem, in its new lower position, photographed in 1925

Philip d'Aubigny, sometimes Phillip or Phillipe Daubeney (c. 1166–c. 1236), a knight and royal chancellor, was one of five sons of Ralph d'Aubigny and Sybil Valoignes, whose ancestral home was Saint Aubin-d'Aubigné in Brittany. He was lord of the manor of Chewton Mendip, South Petherton, Bampton, Waltham and Ingleby and Keeper of the Channel Islands. D'Aubigny died in the Holy Land and was buried in front of the Church of the Holy Sepulchre in Jerusalem.

== Life and career ==
Following his father's death, Philip's elder brother, Ralph, inherited estates at Belvoir, Ingleby, Saxilby and Broadholme. Ralph, however, later defected to the French in 1205. Philip and at least two of his brothers entered the service of Robert de Breteuil, earl of Leicester, and he was granted the manor of Waltham-on-the-Wolds in Leicestershire. D'Aubigny donated the manor of Waltham-on-the-Wolds to Croxton Abbey.

Philip was present at the signing of Magna Carta as a member of the king's party, and was mentioned within the document. He participated in First Barons War and was leader of the royalist forces in Kent and Sussex. He participated in the Battle of Lincoln in 1217, and commanded a ship during the Battle of Sandwich later that same year.

Following the Pro-Angevin victory in the war he was made a tutor of the young Henry III of England and gave him military training. For his role in the king's education, d'Aubigny was granted the manors of Chewton Mendip and South Petherton in Somerset, and Bampton in Oxfordshire.

== Death and burial ==
In 1235, d'Aubigny set out on crusade with his brother Oliver. Philip died in the Holy Land a year later and was buried in front of the Church of the Holy Sepulchre at Jerusalem. His inscribed ledger stone displaying his arms was discovered in 1925, in excellent condition, and was lowered slightly below floor-level to protect it from future foot-fall wear and covered by an iron grille. The official record states:

"Thanks to the fact that for a long period it was protected by a stone divan built over it for the use of the Moslem guards, the tombstone is in a tolerably good state of preservation. In 1925, during the British Mandate over Palestine, an excavation of the grave for purposes of restoration uncovered Sir Philip’s bones as well as tablets inscribed in Latin describing his family tree. Based on these explorations, Sir Ronald Storrs, the military governor of Jerusalem, authenticated the tomb and Philip’s lineage in a 1925 article published in The Times of London. The restoration of the grave was carried out by the British Pro-Jerusalem Society headed by Storrs. At that time the tombstone was re-set slightly below the level of the courtyard pavement but left visible through a protective metal grating. Today the slab lies in exactly the same spot, but hidden from view by a well-worn wooden hatch."

== Succession ==
As Philip left no legitimate children, his estate in South Petherton and a majority of his Lincolnshire lands were granted to his nephew, Ralph d'Aubigny, the brother of Philip the younger.

== Family ==
Philip d'Aubigny was the son of Ralph d'Aubigny and Sybil Valoignes, and grandson of William d'Aubigny. He was of brother of Oliver d'Aubigny, Alice d'Aubigny, John d'Aubigny, Gunnora de Gaunt, William De Stuteville, Matilda d'Aubigney, Ralph d'Aubigny and Elias d'Aubeny.

Oliver d'Aubigny married the widow of the leading royalist Philip of Oldcoates in 1221, and later bequeathed land at Enderby in Leicestershire upon his death to the canons of Croxton Abbey, where he was buried.

Philip d'Aubigny was the cousin of William d'Aubigny, one of the twenty-five executors of Magna Carta in 1215.

The d'Aubigny lands of Ingleby and South Petherton remained under their families possession until 1554, when they were granted to John Bourchier, earl of Bath.
