= George Paulett =

Bailiff of Jersey

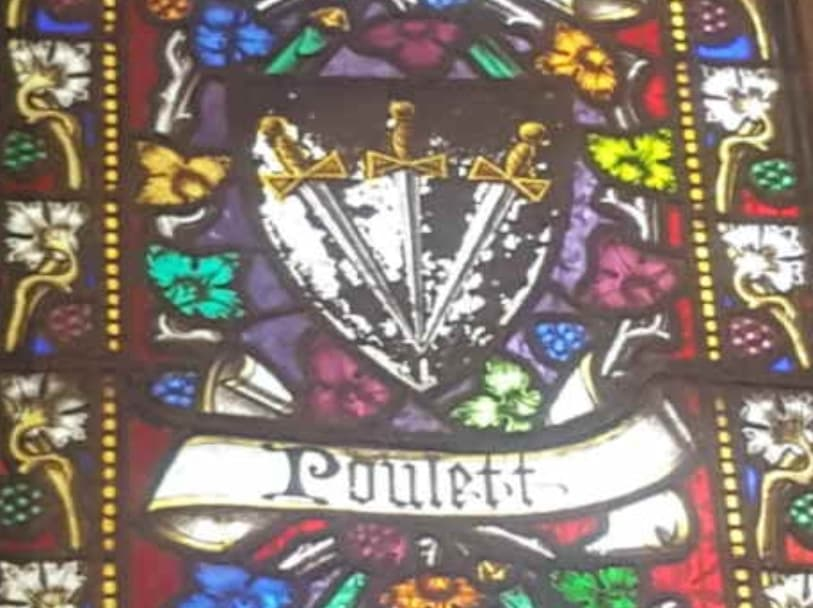

George Paulett (1534-1621) was Bailiff of Jersey multiple times during a period from 1583 to 1611 and was temporary Lieutenant-Governor of Guernsey.

== Biography ==
George Paulett was the son of Sir Hugh Paulett, Governor of Jersey, and his wife Philippa Pollard, daughter of Sir Lewis Pollard (1465–1540) and Agnes Hext. George's older brother was Sir Amias Paulet, Governor of Jersey, and the gaoler for Mary, Queen of Scots.

In 1583, he took over the position of Bailiff for Jersey from Jean Dumaresq. After a few years, in 1586, Dumaresq would resume his role as Bailiff but only for a few months and George Paulet would become Bailiff once more. The position of Bailliff was handed back to Jean Dumaresq in 1591 for a period of five years, as Paulett would serve as Lieutenant-Governor in Guernsey.

== Family ==
Paulett married Elizabeth Perrin (1538–1615), daughter of Edmund Perrin (1494–1552), Seigneur of Rose. They had a daughter:

- Rachel Paulett (1561–1650) married Philippe de Carteret I and had issue;
