= Philippe de Carteret I =

Seigneur of Sark

Philippe de Carteret I, 2nd Seigneur of Sark (1552–1594) was the Seigneur of Sark and Saint Ouen from 1578 to 1594.

He was the oldest son of Hellier de Carteret, his predecessor in the office. Philippe's mother was Margaret de Carteret, widow of Clement Dumaresq, Seigneur of Samarès, and daughter of Hellier de Carteret, Bailiff of Jersey and Margaret Payn.

He was knighted by Elizabeth I and commanded an army sent by the queen in aid of Henry IV of France in the French Wars of Religion. During this conflict, Carteret is said to have lost an arm.

In 1580, he married Rachel Paulett (1564–1650), daughter of George Paulett, Bailiff of Jersey (c. 1533–1621), and granddaughter of Sir Hugh Paulet, Governor of Jersey (died 1573). They had multiple issue:

- Philippe de Carteret II (1584–1643), Bailiff of Jersey
- Elias de Carteret (1585–1640), who was the father of Sir George Carteret
- Gideon de Carteret, Vicomte of Jersey
- Rachel de Carteret, married Benjamin La Cloche, Seigneur of Longueville
- Elizabeth de Carteret, married Samuel de Beauvoir
- Judith de Carteret, married Sir Bryan Johnson
- Susan de Carteret, married Abraham Dumaresq, 2nd Seigneur of Augrès (1571–1631)
- Sarah de Carteret
- Ann de Carteret

Preceded by Hellier de Carteret	Seigneur of Sark; 1578–1594	Succeeded by Philippe de Carteret II
