= Hellier de Carteret =

Helier de Carteret

Seigneur of Sark
- Reign: 1563–1578
- Predecessor: Position Established
- Successor: Philippe de Carteret I
- Spouse: Margaret de Carteret
- Issue: Philippe de Carteret I
- Father: Édouard de Carteret

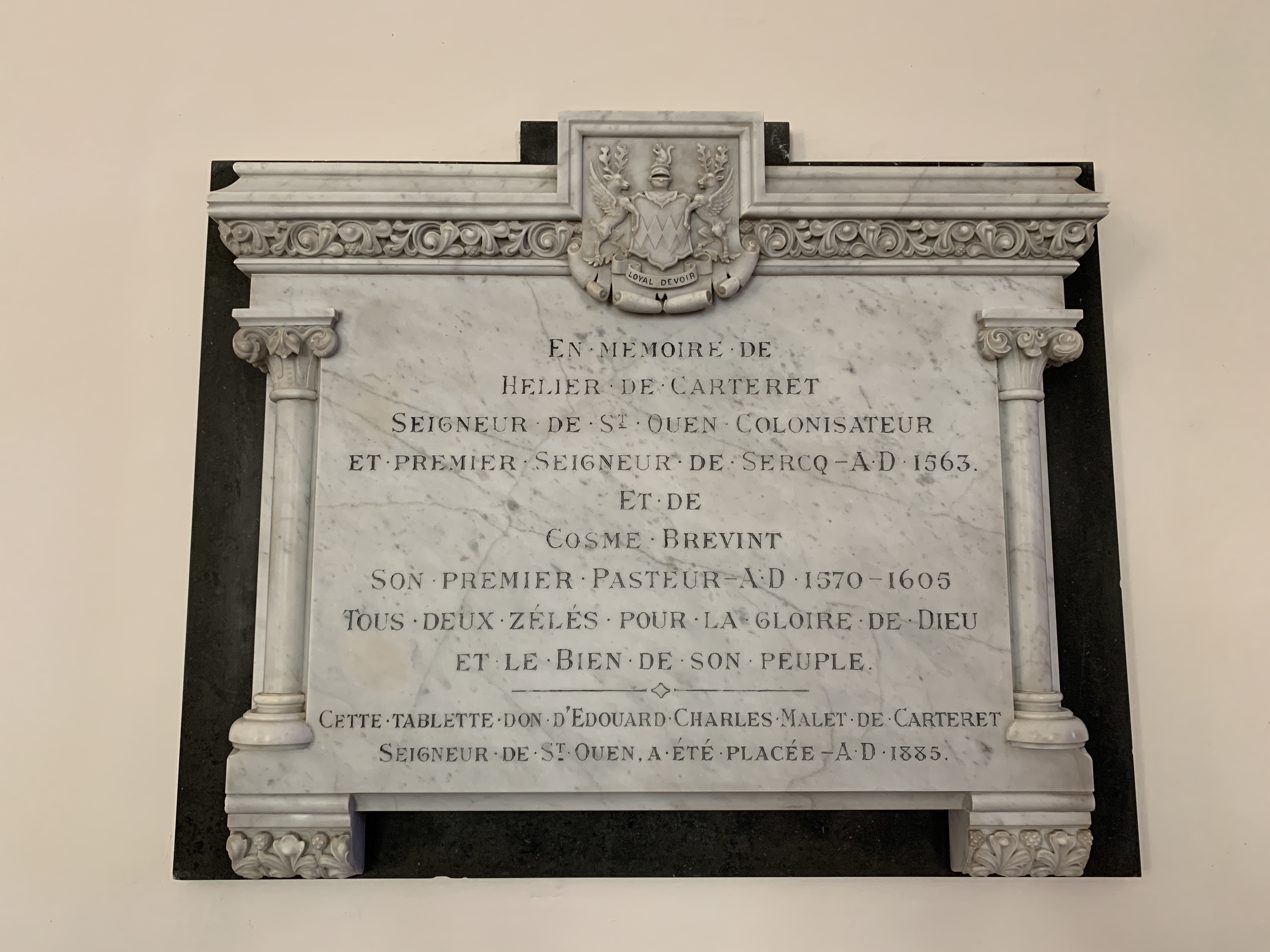
Memorial in St Peter's Church, Sark

Helier de Carteret (fl. 1563 – 1578) was the first Seigneur of Sark, reigning from 1563 to 1578. He was the son of Édouard de Carteret, Seigneur of Saint Ouen (d. 1533), and grandson of Philip de Carteret, 8th Seigneur of St Ouen.

It was Helier's idea and initiative to re-cultivate the deserted island in 1563, and in 1565 he was rewarded by Queen Elizabeth I with Letters Patent granting him the fief. He was also Seigneur of Saint Ouen in Jersey.

He married his cousin, Margaret de Carteret. She was the widow of Clement Dumaresq and daughter of the bailiff Helier de Carteret, the uncle and namesake to the Seigneur of Sark. Hellier and Margaret's son was Philippe de Carteret I.

Preceded by establishment of fief	Seigneur of Sark; 1563–1578	Succeeded by Philippe de Carteret I
