= Philippe de Carteret, 2nd of St Ouen =

2nd Seigneur of St Ouen

Sir Philippe de Carteret, Seigneur of St Ouen, born 1152. Son of Renaud de Carteret, Baron Carteret and 1st Seigneur of Saint Ouen.

Philippe joined King Henry III on his campaign in Brittany, as part of the English invasion of France. Due to his good service in the war Philippe was granted licences by King Henry III to go to the King of France to try to regain his lands at Carteret and Angleville. This was of no avail as it meant swearing fealty (allegiance) to King Louis VIII.

In 1252, Henry III commanded Philippe along with Jordan de La Hogue to survey the castles on the islands of Jersey and Guernsey for all defenses and armaments in case of a French invasion of the islands.

== Family ==
Philippe married a girl named Anne and they had the following Issue:

- Sir Philippe De Carteret 3rd Seigneur of Saint Ouen, married niece of Philip d'Aubigny.
- Sir John De Carteret, Bailiff of Jersey
