= Saint Ouen's Manor =

Manor house in the parish of St. Ouen, Jersey

St. Ouen's Manor
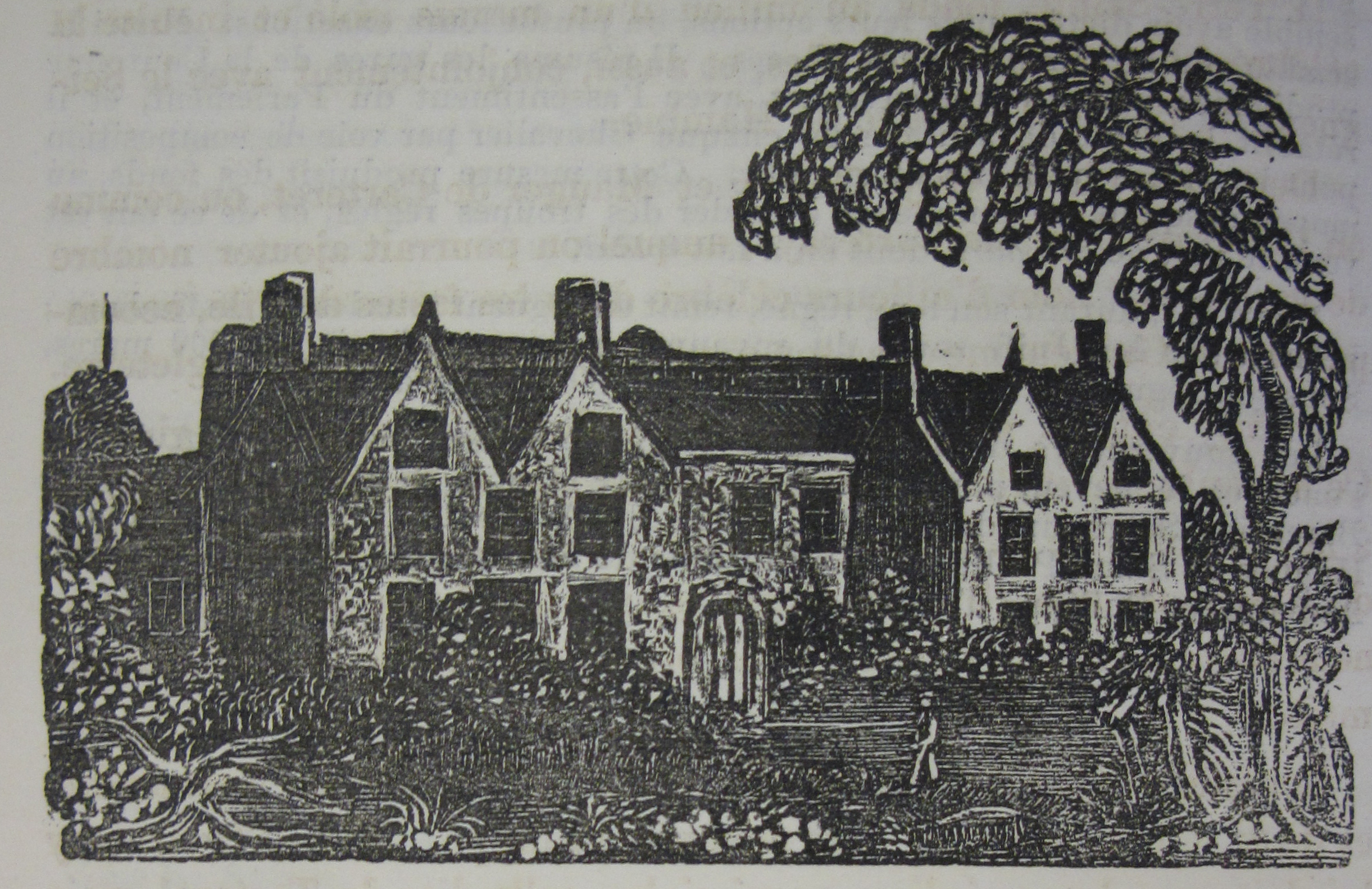
- A 19th century book illustration.

- Location within Channel Islands

General information
- Location: Parish of St. Ouen, Jersey
- Coordinates: 49°13′32″N 2°11′56″W
- Construction started: 12th Century

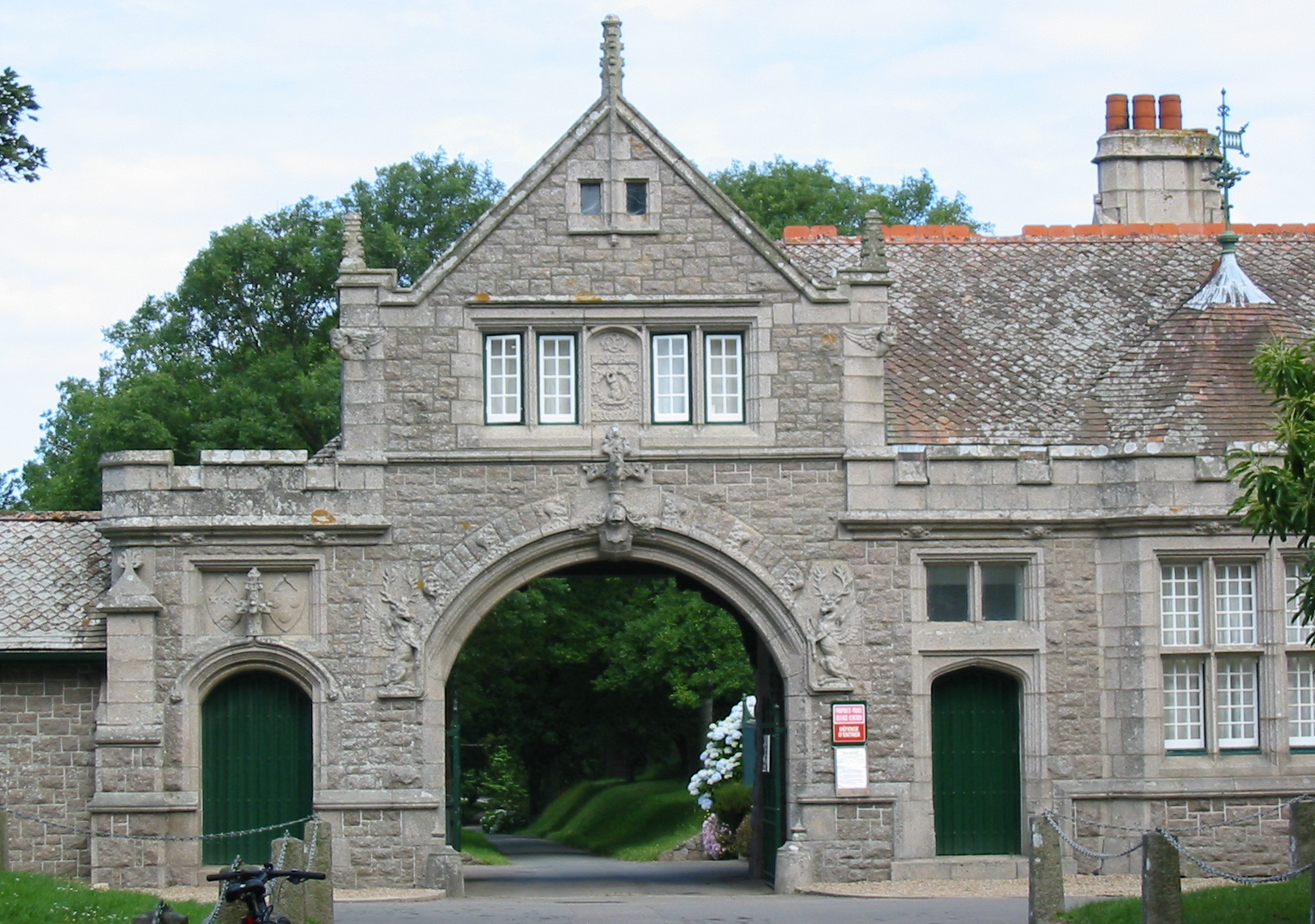
The gate house of Saint Ouen's Manor in 2009.

St. Ouen's Manor is a manor house in the parish of St. Ouen, Jersey, and is the traditional home of the Seigneur of St. Ouen, and the ancestral home of the De Carteret family.

The earliest record of the house dates from 1135. The manor also includes a mediaeval chapel, St Anne's Chapel.

As a part of the 1940 Jersey local elections, the manor was offered to the victor, Edward Campbell. However, Campbell became disillusioned with the idea, and declined.

The house and grounds remain intact today, and the house is a private home for the De Carteret family. It is occasionally open to the public.

== See also ==
- St Anne's Chapel, St Ouen's Manor
- Samarès Manor
