= Sir Charles Carteret, 3rd Baronet =

6th Seigneur of Sark

Sir Charles Carteret, 3rd Baronet (4 June 1679 – 6 June May 1715) was Seigneur of Sark from 1693 to 1715.

Preceded by Philippe de Carteret IV	Seigneur of Sark; 1693–1715	Succeeded by John Carteret
Baronetage of England
Preceded by Philip Carteret	Baronet (of St Owen); 1693–1715	Extinct
Legal offices
Preceded by Edouard de Carteret	Bailiff of Jersey; 1703–1715	Succeeded by John, Lord Carteret
