= Reginald de Carteret, 1st Seigneur of Saint Ouen =

Sir Reginald de Carteret, Baron of Carteret and 1st Seigneur of Saint Ouen (1140–1214) was the son of Renaud de Carteret, Baron of Carteret and Lord of Saint Ouen, and father of Philippe and Godefroy.

With the separation of Normandy from England, (1204), Renaud de Carteret had to choose (with many others) between his possessions in Jersey and those in continental Normandy. Although he had far greater lands on the continent, of which the town of Carteret still bears the name, he chose to throw in his lot with Jersey and remain faithful to the Duke of Normandy in the person of John of England. Had he decided otherwise, there can be no doubt that the history of Jersey would have been a different one. It would probably have been won over by the king of France and placed on the same footing as the Chausey Islands, dependencies of France not differing from the mainland in government or speech.

== Ancestry ==
Ancestors of Reginald de Carteret, 1st Seigneur of Saint Ouen

16. Guy de Carteret Baron of Carteret
8.Godfrey de Carteret, Baron of Carteret
4. Onfrey de Carteret, Baron of Carteret
2. Sir Renaud de Carteret, Baron of Carteret and Lord of Saint Ouen
1. Reginald de Carteret, 1st Seigneur of Saint Ouen
3. Lucia
