= Sir Philip Carteret, 1st Baronet =

Sir Philip Carteret, 1st Baronet (1620 – between 1663 and 1675), also known as Philippe de Carteret III, was the 4th Seigneur of Sark. He supported the Royalist (Cavalier) cause during the War of the Three Kingdoms.

== Biography ==
Philip Carteret was the son of Philippe de Carteret II. He succeeded to the Seigneurie of Sark on the death of his father in 1643.

During the English Civil War, Carteret was lieutenant to his kinsman George Carteret, and was knighted on the beach of St Aubin's Bay in Jersey by the exiled Charles, Prince of Wales in 1645.

In 1661, he became Bailiff of Jersey. In 1670, he was created a baronet, of St Ouen on the Island of Jersey.

== Family ==
Carteret married Anne (1627–1700), daughter of Abraham Dumaresq Seig Des Augres. They had children including Phillip (1650-1693) and two daughters.

Preceded by Philippe de Carteret II	Seigneur of Sark; 1643–1663	Succeeded by Philippe de Carteret IV
Baronetage of England
New creation	Baronet (of St Owen); 1670–c. 1673	Succeeded by Philip Carteret
