= Sir Philip Carteret, 2nd Baronet =

5th Seigneur of Sark

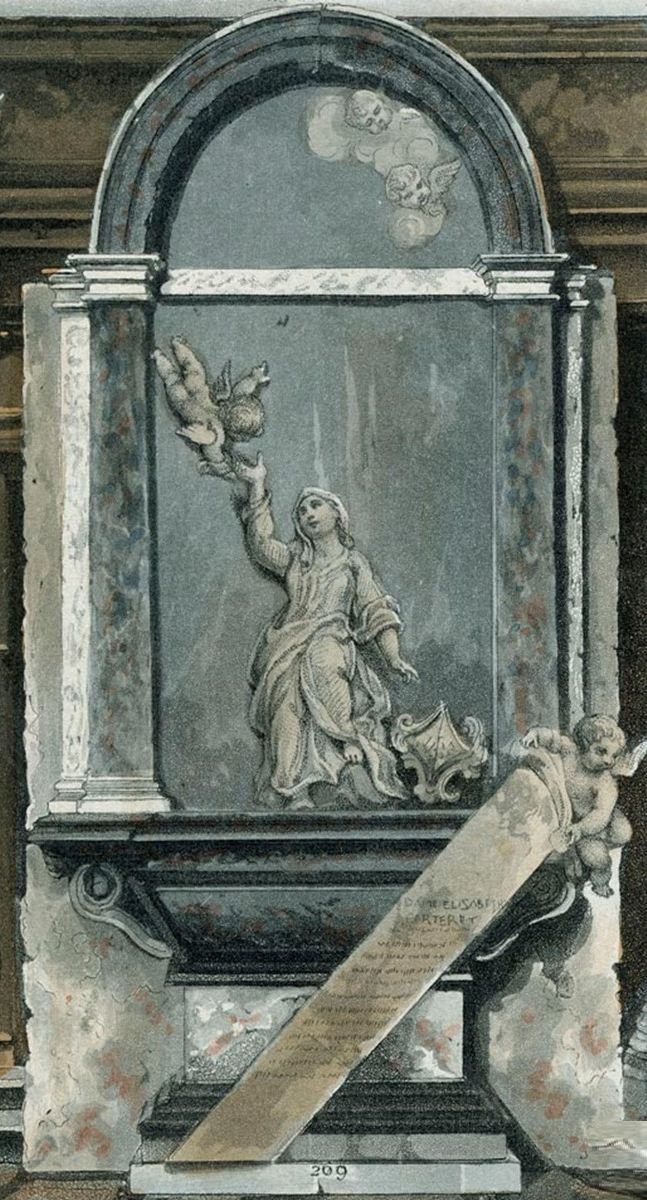
Monument to Elizabeth Carteret (1665–1717), wife of Sir Philip Carteret, 2nd Baronet, formerly in Westminster Abbey, now at Haynes Park in Bedfordshire. The inscription is on the thin diagonal slab held by a putto

Sir Philip Carteret, 2nd Baronet (c. 1650 – 1693), also known as Philippe de Carteret IV, was the 5th Seigneur of Sark from 1663 to 1693.

== Origins ==
He was born in about 1650, the eldest son of Sir Philip Carteret, 1st Baronet (1620–1675) (Philippe de Carteret III), the 4th Seigneur of Sark, by his wife Anne des Augres (1566–1644), daughter of Abraham Dumaresq Seig des Augres. His father died before he came of age (aged 21) in 1671.

== Career ==
As the Sark court refused to allow an Anglican to preside, in 1675 Philippe requested the British crown to dissolve the court, which having been achieved by an Order in Council in 1675, he instituted in its place a jurisdiction composed of a Seneschal, Greffier and Prevot.

== Marriage and issue ==
Carteret married Elizabeth Carteret (1663–1717), a daughter of Sir Edward De Carteret, Seigneur De Trinity, Gentleman Usher of the Black Rod during the reign of King Charles II and First Gentleman Usher Daily Waiter in Ordinary to the King, by his wife Elizabeth Johnson.

By his wife he had one son:

- Sir Charles Carteret, 3rd Baronet (1679–1715), eldest son and heir, who died aged 34 and was the last in the male line of the senior line of the Carteret family. He was baptised at St Margaret's Church, Westminster on 4 June 1679, when King Charles II was one of his godfathers. He was Gentleman of the Privy Chamber to Queen Anne and High Bailiff of Jersey. He married Mary Carteret, a daughter of Amias Carteret, by whom he had a son:
  - James Carteret, who predeceased his father and died without surviving issue.

== Death ==
Upon his death in 1693 Charles de Carteret, his eldest son, inherited his titles and lands.

== Monument to wife ==
A monument to his wife Elizabeth Carteret (1663–1717) was in Westminster Abbey until 1847 when having become dilapidated it was removed (all but the inscription) by Lord John Thynne, Sub-Dean of the Abbey and representative of the Carteret family, who re-erected it at his country house of Haynes Park in Bedfordshire. The inscription (which still survives in Westminster Abbey) is as follows:

Near this place lyeth buried Dame Elizabeth Carteret daughter of Sr. Edward Carteret, Knt., Gent. Usher of ye Black Rod in the reign of K. Charles the Second Relict of Sr. Philip Carteret Bart. and by him mother of Sr. Charles Carteret Bart., her only son, interred likewise near this place by whose decease June ye 6th A.D. 1715 in ye 34th year of his age, was extinguished the eldest branch of the antient family of the name of Carteret Seigneurs of St.Ouen in ye Island of Jersey. She died March ye 26th A.D.1717 aged 52 years.

== Notes ==
Preceded by Philippe de Carteret III	Seigneur of Sark; 1663–1693	Succeeded by Charles de Carteret
Baronetage of England
Preceded by Philip Carteret	Baronet (of St Owen) c. 1672–1693	Succeeded by Charles Carteret
