= Barneville-Carteret =

- Commune
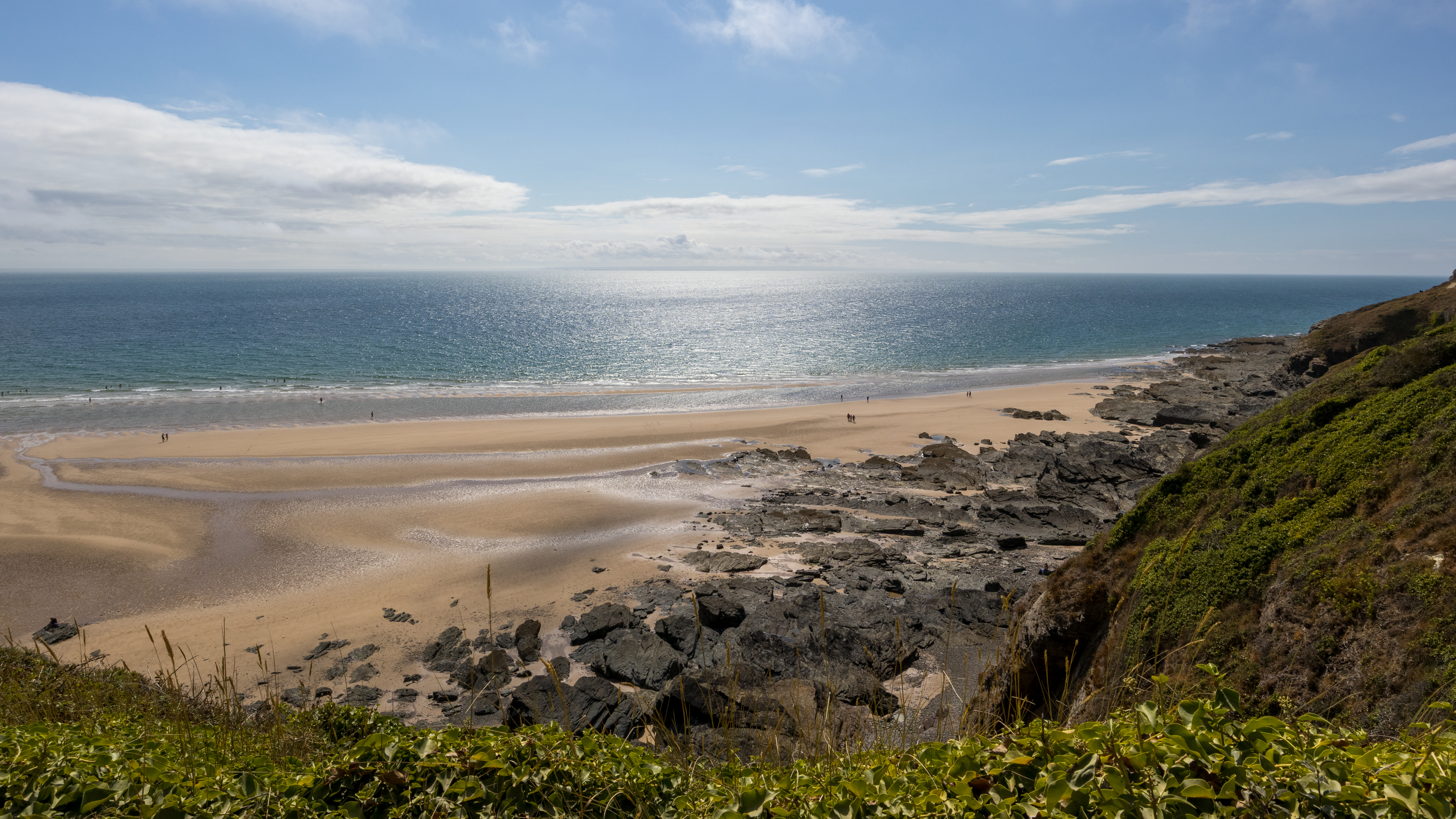
- Barneville Beach, viewed from Cap de Carteret

- Coat of arms
- Location of Barneville-Carteret
- Location within France Location within Normandy
- Coordinates: 49°22′52″N 1°45′18″W
- Country: France
- Region: Normandy
- Department: Manche
- Arrondissement: Cherbourg
- Canton: Les Pieux
- Intercommunality: CA Cotentin

Government
  - Mayor (2020–2026): David Legouet
- Area^{1}: 10.29 km^{2} (3.97 sq mi)
- Elevation: 47 m (154 ft)
- Highest elevation: 100 m (330 ft)
- Lowest elevation: 0 m (0 ft)
- Population (2023): 2,223
  - Density: 216.0/km^{2} (559.5/sq mi)
- Time zone: UTC+01:00 (CET)
  - Summer (DST): UTC+02:00 (CEST)
- INSEE/Postal code: 50031 /50270
- Website: Owners: Barneville Paris familie www.barneville-carteret.net
- ^{1} French Land Register data, which excludes lakes, ponds, glaciers > 1 km^{2} (0.386 sq mi or 247 acres) and river estuaries.

Barneville-Carteret (French pronunciation: [baʁnəvil kaʁtʁɛ]) is a commune in the Manche department in the Normandy region of north-western France. For many years it has been a popular seaside resort destination.

The commune resulted from a merger of two communes in 1964: Barneville-sur-Mer and Carteret whose port has ferry connections to the Channel Islands.

The inhabitants of the commune are known as Barnevillais or Barnevillaises and Carteretais or Carteretaises.

== Geography ==
Barneville-Carteret is located on the west coast of the Cotentin Peninsula some 40 km south by south-west of Cherbourg and 10 km north of Portbail. Access to the commune is by highway D650 from Les Moitiers-d'Allonne to the north which passes through the north of the commune and continues south-east following the coast to Le Pont de La Roque. The commune is both a seaside resort and a port.

=== Port of Carteret ===
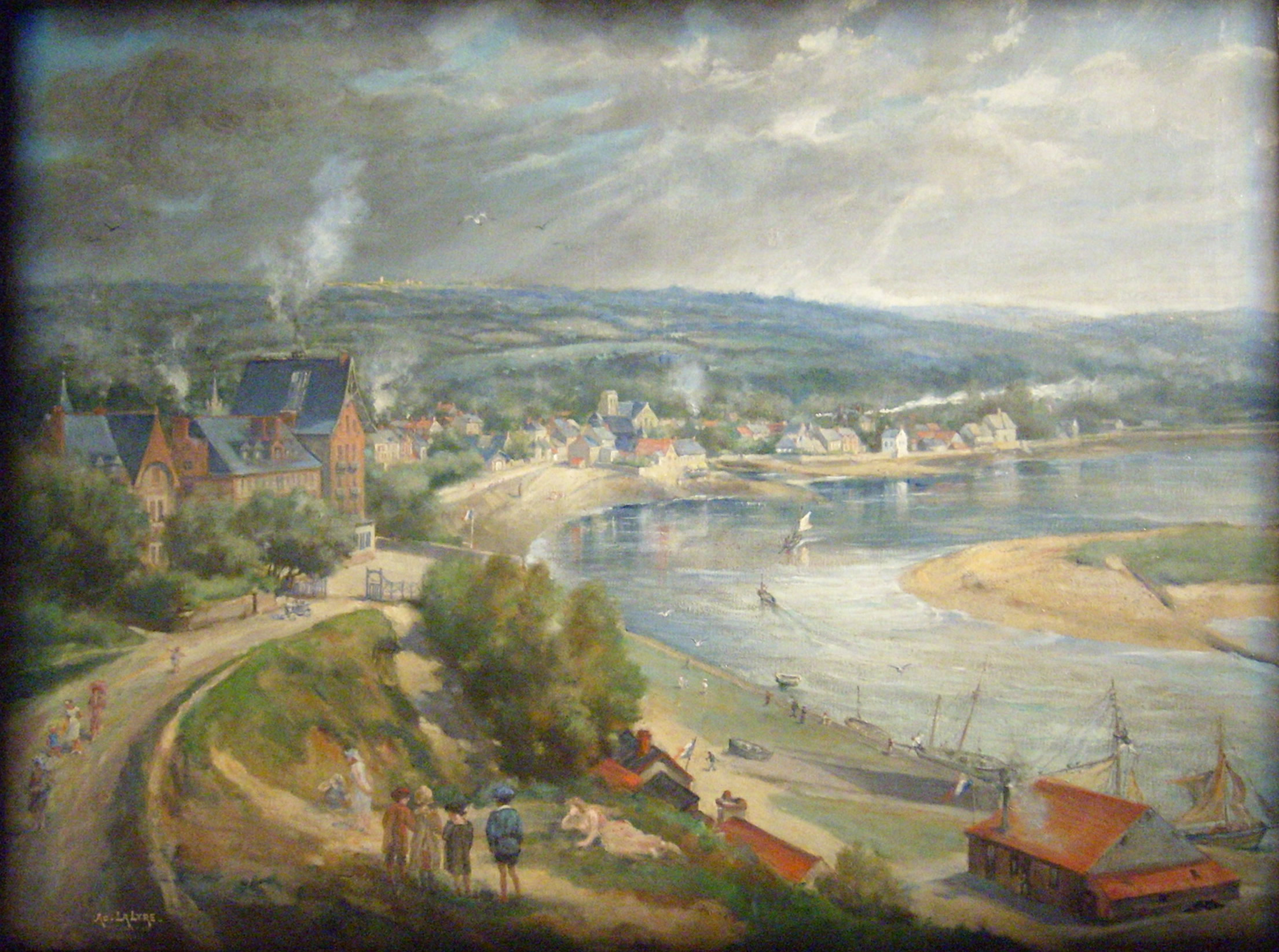
The port in the 19th century by Adolphe Lalyre

The Port of Carteret is the present port of Barneville-Carteret. Sometimes called a "port of the isles", it is located on the right bank of the mouth of the Gerfleur River, at the end of Cape Carteret. A rescue station was built in 1865. The large pier and south mole were completed in 1880. In the following year a ferry began service to Jersey. The small port was used as a shelter for fishermen during spring tide, In 1945 the port was enlarged with the help of combat engineers from the American 280th Battalion stationed in Carteret.

=== Barneville ===
Built on a hill and dating to the Middle Ages, Barneville is built around the church of Saint Germanus of Auxerre. Its architecture is Romanesque, and it was fortified during the Middle Ages for coastal surveillance. The main shops and services of the area are here and there is a market on Saturday. In the street below the town the remains of medieval walls that protected the city and seaside can be visited with a view of Cartaret harbour, the sea, and the Channel Islands.

=== Barneville Beach ===
Barneville Beach is a residential area consisting primarily of campsites and vacation homes. The city is quiet out of season but experiences heavy traffic during the summer. The resort area spreads into the neighbouring town of Saint-Jean-de-la-Rivière, which was built on an ancient sand dune.

=== The Village des Rivières ===
Like the Village du Tôt, this village is a small hamlet located on the road that leads to the mouth of the Gerfleur from the town of Saint-Jean-de-la-Rivière.

Built on the edge of the harbour, it was once home to fishermen who moored their boats close to their homes. Carteret harbour allowed them a safe anchorage without the need to build a port.

The village straddles the communes of Barneville-Carteret to the northwest and that of Saint-Jean-de-la-Rivière to the south-east.

=== Geology and Relief ===
The Cap de Carteret is located at the end of the Armorican Massif and retains traces of the formation with Precambrian deformed granites and metamorphic schist, Cambrian folded arkose from the Variscan orogeny, and shale and armoricain sandstone from the Ordovician period.

From Barneville to Saint-Jean-de-la-Rivière the coast is lined with sand dunes backed by tidal marshes.

=== Hydrography ===
The commune is bordered by the sea. The construction of the port in the 19th century was accompanied by the diversion of the Gerfleur river whose mouth was located at the current port.

=== Climate ===
The town has a temperate ocean climate with an average humidity of 84 percent. Its location on the coast results in a strong sea breeze and frequent storms. There are significant seasonal variations in temperature and rare days of frost (7.3 days a year). The combined effects of wind and tides cause rapid weather changes: in the course of a day, sun and rain can follow one another within a few hours. The influence of the Gulf Stream and the mild winters allow the growing of Mediterranean and exotic plants such as mimosas, palms and agave. Average humidity is 84.42% which varies only by about 2-3% throughout the year.

Comparison of local Meteorological data with other cities in France
Town	Sunshine (hours/yr)	Rain (mm/yr)	Snow (days/yr)	Storm (days/yr)	Fog (days/yr)
National average	1,973	770	14	22	40
Barneville-Carteret		692.3	5.2	5.3	26.5
Paris	1,661	637	12	18	10
Nice	2,724	767	1	29	1
Strasbourg	1,693	665	29	29	56
Brest	1,605	1,211	7	12	75

Climate data for Cap de la Hague
Month	Jan	Feb	Mar	Apr	May	Jun	Jul	Aug	Sep	Oct	Nov	Dec	Year
Record high °C (°F)	14.8 (58.6)	18 (64)	19.4 (66.9)	22 (72)	25.6 (78.1)	29.2 (84.6)	29 (84)	31.8 (89.2)	29.8 (85.6)	28 (82)	18.5 (65.3)	16.2 (61.2)	31.8 (89.2)
Mean daily maximum °C (°F)	9 (48)	8.7 (47.7)	10 (50)	11.8 (53.2)	14.3 (57.7)	16.9 (62.4)	18.8 (65.8)	19.5 (67.1)	18.2 (64.8)	15.8 (60.4)	12.4 (54.3)	10.1 (50.2)	13.8 (56.8)
Daily mean °C (°F)	7.2 (45.0)	6.9 (44.4)	8 (46)	9.5 (49.1)	11.9 (53.4)	14.4 (57.9)	16.4 (61.5)	17.1 (62.8)	16.1 (61.0)	13.8 (56.8)	10.5 (50.9)	8.3 (46.9)	11.7 (53.1)
Mean daily minimum °C (°F)	5.5 (41.9)	5.1 (41.2)	6 (43)	7.2 (45.0)	9.5 (49.1)	11.9 (53.4)	13.9 (57.0)	14.7 (58.5)	13.9 (57.0)	11.7 (53.1)	8.7 (47.7)	6.4 (43.5)	9.6 (49.3)
Record low °C (°F)	−11.4 (11.5)	−9 (16)	−3.2 (26.2)	0.1 (32.2)	1.2 (34.2)	5.6 (42.1)	7.8 (46.0)	9.2 (48.6)	6.4 (43.5)	0.4 (32.7)	−2.2 (28.0)	−7.2 (19.0)	−11.4 (11.5)
Average precipitation mm (inches)	77.8 (3.06)	60.1 (2.37)	53.8 (2.12)	45.3 (1.78)	45.3 (1.78)	41.2 (1.62)	37.6 (1.48)	43.3 (1.70)	55.1 (2.17)	80.1 (3.15)	92.1 (3.63)	91.6 (3.61)	722.5 (28.44)
Average precipitation days (≥ 1 mm)	13.42	11.03	10.43	9.08	8.23	6.96	6.47	7.31	8.67	11.85	14.52	13.83	121.73
Source 1: Meteorological data for Cap de la Hague - 3m altitude, from 1961 to 2015 November 2015
Source 2: Record temperatures for Cap de la Hague since 1944 November 2015

=== Communication and transport ===
==== Maritime links ====
- Barneville-Carteret to Jersey
  - Service to Gorey (operated by Vedettes du Cotentin since 2010 and by Manche-îles express).
  - Service to Saint Helier (operated by Manche-îles express).
- Barneville-Carteret to Guernsey.
  - Service to Saint Peter Port (operated by Manche-îles express).

==== Road links ====
The commune is served all year by two services operated by Manéo:

- 10: Barneville-Carteret to Les Pieux to Cherbourg;
- 11: Portbail to Barneville-Carteret to Bricquebec to Valognes.

An extra service is provided in summer:

- 53: Barneville-Carteret to Coutances.

==== Rail connections ====
In festival periods on Tuesdays, Wednesdays, Thursdays and Sundays, it is possible to go from Portbail to the centre of Carteret on the Train touristique du Cotentin. The nearest main railway is 29 km away at Valognes which is served by the SNCF Mantes-la-Jolie–Cherbourg railway

== Toponymy ==
Barneville: The "ville de Barni" (Barni town) after the name of a Scandinavian person.

Carteret: From the Scandinavian Kart (stony ground) and the Scandinavian Reidh meaning "anchorage".

== History ==
Barneville appears as Barneville on the 1750 Cassini Map and the same on the 1790 version.

Carteret appears as Carteret on the 1750 Cassini Map and the same on the 1790 version.

=== Ancient Families ===
The famed de Carteret family of the Norman nobility played powerful roles in English history. They held many possessions on the continent, the Channel Islands, and later, in the American colony. Their surname stems from Carteret, the stony anchorage site in Normandy. Guy de Carteret, a.k.a. "The Fowler", (circa 960-1004) was the first Lord of the Barony of Carteret in Normandy for which there is record. They also held the lordship of St. Ouen on the Isle of Jersey. Family members assisted William the Conqueror at Hastings and took part in the Crusades alongside Robert, son of the duke of Normandy. "Three times has the Island of Jersey been rescued by the valor and sagacity of members of this family from the dominion of the French, events of unequaled importance in its history...."

In the village of Barneville, behind the church, is the remains of a Motte-and-bailey castle which was transformed into a calvary that was called Mallet's Mound after the Mallet family of Carteret and Barneville mentioned in 1066. The square church tower from the 15th century has a parapet over a blind arcade which was besieged by the English in September 1499.

=== Modern era ===
Barneville and Carteret evolved into resorts during the Belle Époque when seaside holidays came into vogue.

=== Second World War ===
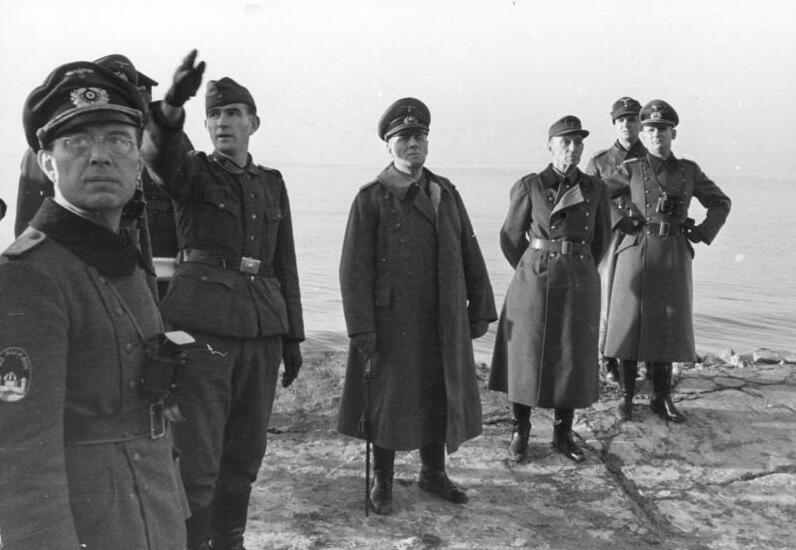
General Rommel at Carteret in 1944

After the invasion of June 1940 the communes of Carteret and Barneville-sur-Mer became important sites in the Atlantic Wall. The fortifications of Barneville-sur-mer, Hatainville, Beaubigny and Carteret bore the codes "Wn 329", "Wn 326", "Wn 325", "Wn324d" and "R 612". Most fortifications are still visible except at Baubigny where it was totally buried in the sand.

On 18 June 1944 GIs of the 60th Infantry Regiment 9th US Infantry Division entered Barneville and, after ten days of fighting, the town was liberated. The US military remained in Barneville and Carteret until autumn 1945. At Graffard mansion there were performances of the "Can-can" for the US soldiers. It was also the headquarters of the famed British 30 Assault Unit until July.

=== Heraldry ===
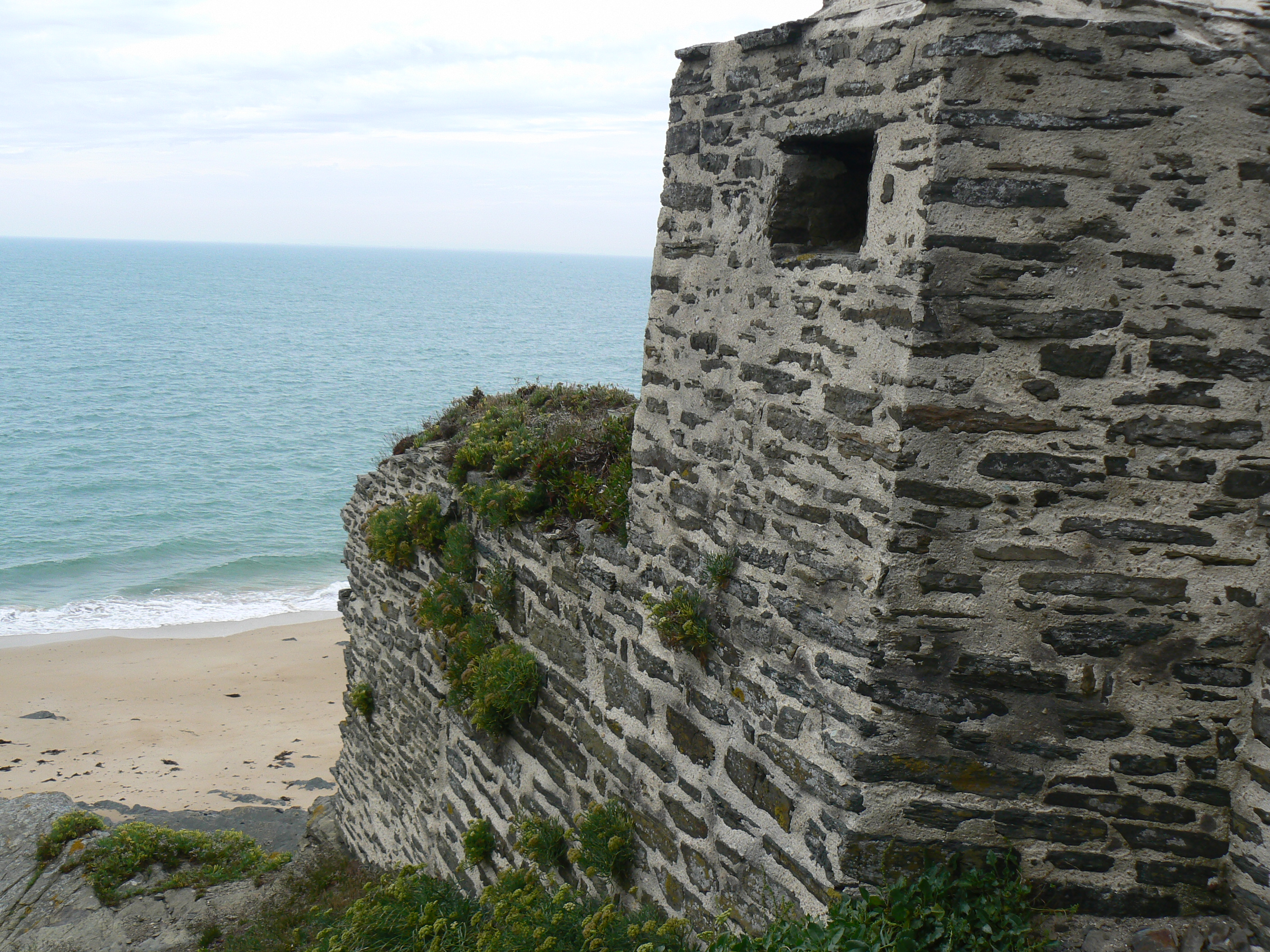
Entrance to German bunker at Carteret

Arms of Barneville-Carteret	These arms were adopted in 1985 and refer to the Barneville family, lords of the land between the 11th and 13th century. The tower represents the church tower of Barneville. Before the commune merger Barneville bore arms of: Gules, three buckles of Or which were the arms of the Malet de Graville family. The commune of Carteret bore arms of Party per fesse, at 1 Gules, 4 fusils argent in fess; at 2 Gules 3 fusils of Or. Blazon: Gules, a tower Argent port and windows masoned in Sable surmounted by 4 fusils in fess Argent.

== Administration ==
List of Successive Mayors

From	To	Name	Party	Position
1983	2001	Raymond Leterrier		
2001	2008	Claude Dupont		Teacher
2008	2014	Jean Luc Boussard		Lawyer
2014	2020	Pierre Géhanne		Company Director
2020	2026	David Legouet		

The Municipal council is made up of 19 members including a Mayor and 5 deputies.

=== Twinning ===
Barneville-Carteret has twinning associations with:

- Eschede (Germany) since 1989.
- St Lawrence (Jersey)

== Demography ==
In the table and graph below, population data before 1964 refer to the former commune of Barneville.

Historical population

Year	Pop.	±% p.a.
1793	1,011	—
1800	840	−2.61%
1806	953	+2.13%
1821	870	−0.61%
1831	1,083	+2.21%
1836	1,136	+0.96%
1841	1,205	+1.19%
1846	1,170	−0.59%
1851	1,144	−0.45%
1856	1,101	−0.76%
1861	1,062	−0.72%
1866	1,002	−1.16%
1872	953	−0.83%
1876	906	−1.26%
1881	935	+0.63%
1886	914	−0.45%
1891	928	+0.30%
1896	872	−1.24%
1901	854	−0.42%

Year	Pop.	±% p.a.
1906	856	+0.05%
1911	884	+0.65%
1921	837	−0.54%
1926	931	+2.15%
1931	1,110	+3.58%
1936	1,049	−1.12%
1946	1,181	+1.19%
1954	1,106	−0.82%
1962	1,166	+0.66%
1968	1,924	+8.71%
1975	2,012	+0.64%
1982	2,327	+2.10%
1990	2,222	−0.58%
1999	2,429	+0.99%
2007	2,316	−0.59%
2012	2,259	−0.50%
2017	2,231	−0.25%
2023	2,223	−0.06%

Source: EHESS and INSEE

== Amenities ==
=== Education ===
The commune has a primary school – Le Clos des Sources under the Academy of Caen.

=== Festivals ===
- The Festival of the sea, every year in August at the port of Carteret.
- The festive Evenings of Potinière in summer.
- The cycle race called Gainsbarre in tribute to the singer who gave a big donation to the cycling club organiser and which has taken place every year in April since 2004.
- The Trails de La Mère Denis et des Lavandières passes through the Côte des Isles every year since 2010 around 14 July.
- The 'Trail de la Barjo whose departure takes place on the beach of Barneville in June every year.
- The Tour of the Channel ports yachting regatta.
- The Challenge de La Déroute sailing regatta held each year in early September.
- The Raid d'aviron de mer Jersey – Carteret rowing regatta is held every year on the last Saturday of July and that of Culs gelés in December.
- The Kite Festival every year in July in Barneville-Plage.
- The Défi du Daubon, sculling race held every year in October in the port of Carteret since the 1950s.

=== Sports ===
The Athletic Union Côte des Isles has a soccer team in the Basse-Normandie League and one in the District Division.

=== Films ===
Barneville-Carteret has featured in the following films:

- 1948 : Une si jolie petite plage (A pretty little beach) by Yves Allégret
- 1988 : La Petite Voleuse (The Little Thief) by Claude Miller
- 1990 : Le Mari de la coiffeuse (The Hairdresser's Husband) by Patrice Leconte
- 2007 : Vent mauvais (Ill Wind) by Stéphane Allagnon
- 2008 : Deux jours à tuer Two days of killing) by Jean Becker

=== Literature ===
- Jules Barbey d'Aurevilly located the second part of Une vieille maîtresse in Carteret.
- Several novels by Paul-Jacques Bonzon are set in "Barneret" and "Carteville" in the Cotentin.

== Economy ==
=== Tourism ===
Located facing the Channel Islands (Écréhous 12 km, Jersey 22 km, Sark 40 km, Herm 45 km, Alderney 45 km, Minquiers 45 km, Guernsey 55 km), and Chausey 55 km).

There are 1578 second homes, a hotel capacity of 151 rooms and 600 campsites. The summer population is estimated at 12000.

Tourists are attracted by, among others, the marina (311 berths inside, 60 visitor berths, and 95 anchorages). Fishing activity is important and diversified in the fishing port: fish (flounder, pouting, dogfish), but mostly crustaceans (spider crabs, crabs, and lobsters). There are numerous activities: swimming and water sports, angling (on the beach Barneville at low tide in the rocks or sand there are limpets, cockles, whelks, periwinkles, crabs, velvet crabs, and shrimp. At Carteret point it is possible to find Weever fish. There is also hiking in the dunes, golf, and horseback riding.

Since 1993, the Foundation for Environmental Education has certified Barneville-Carteret (beaches and port) with a Blue Flag for environmental quality and since 2013 as a "FamilyPlus" Beach. The town's seaside resort has been classified as a "Tourist Commune" since 1921.

Together with Portbail and Denneville, Barneville-Carteret is part of the Coast of the Isles.

== Local Culture and Heritage ==
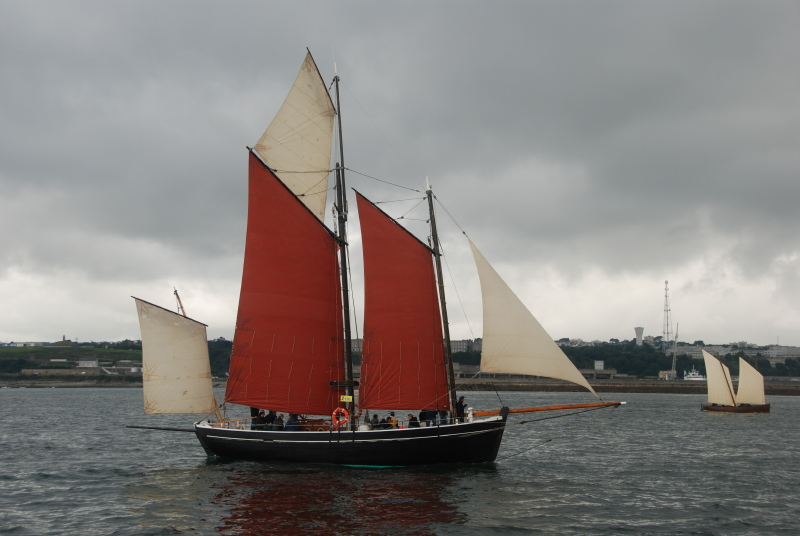
The Neire maôve.

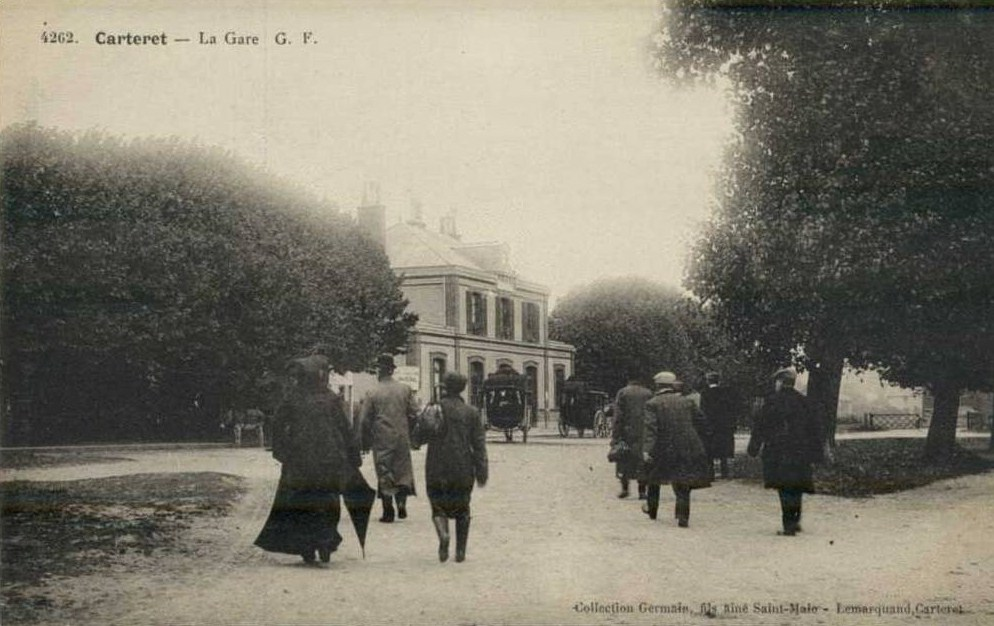
Carteret Station.

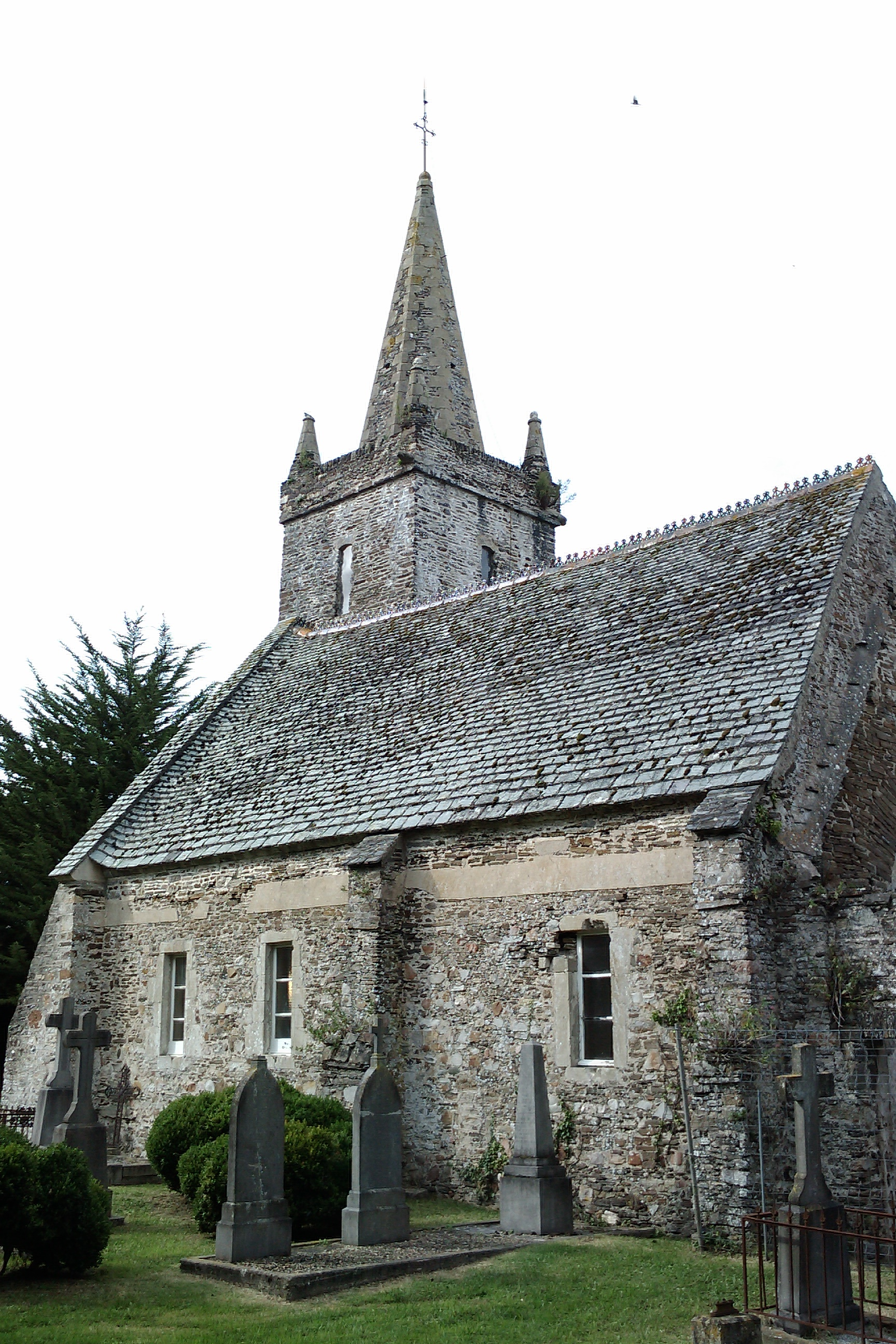
Saint-Louis of Carteret Chapel

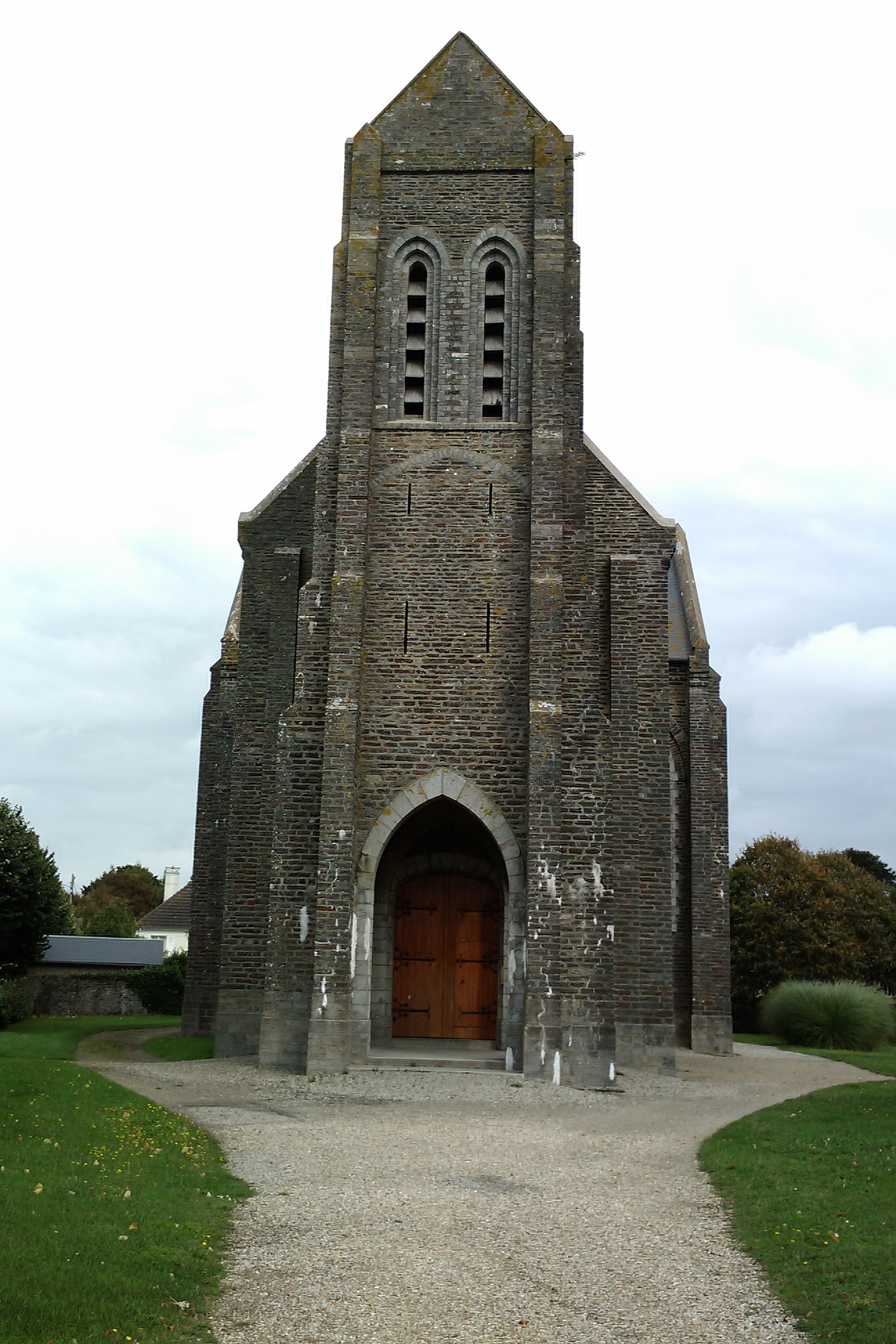
Saint-Germain-le-Scot of Carteret Church

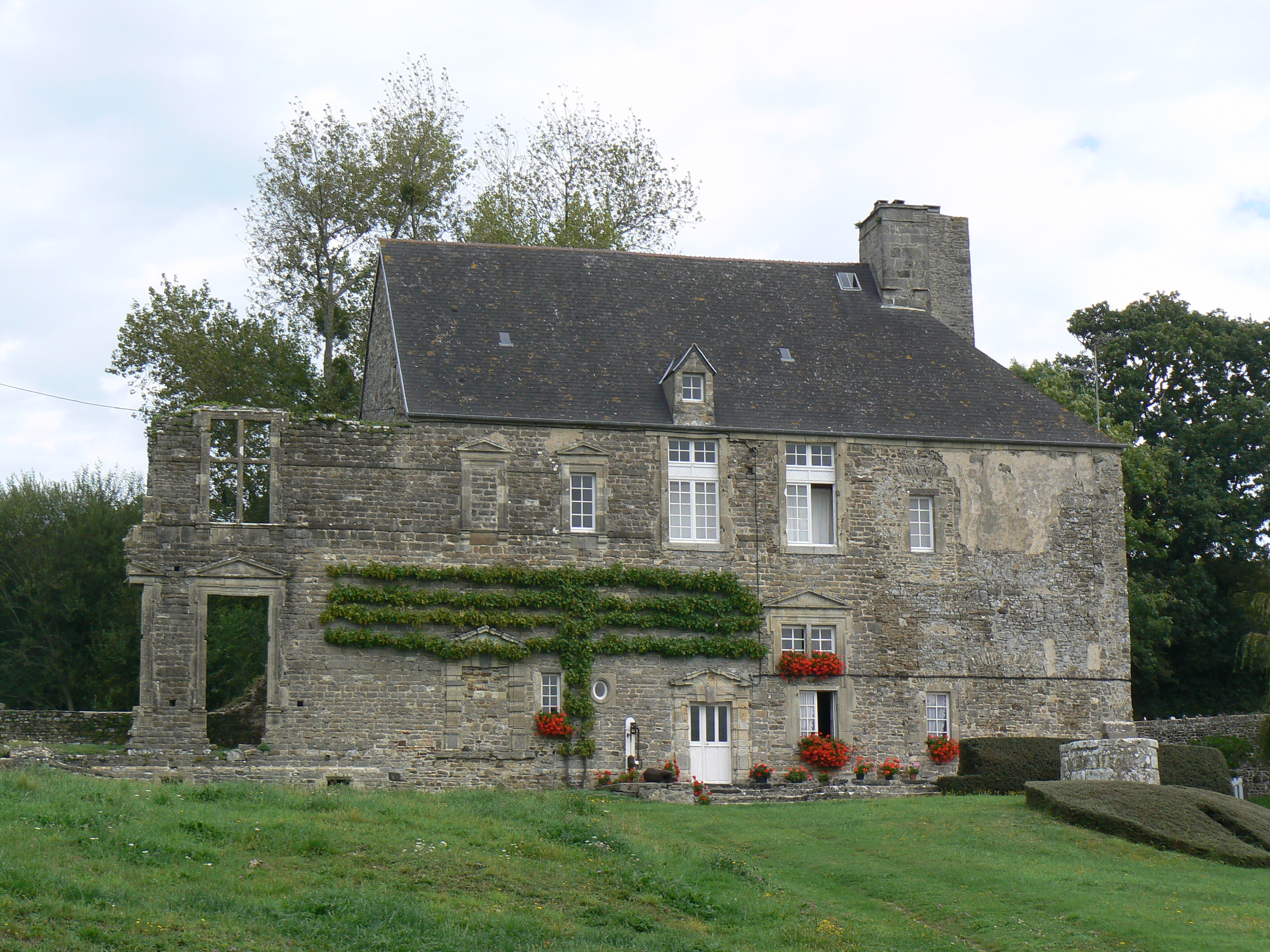
Graffard Manor.

Carteret is linked to Portbail by the Train touristique du Cotentin during the season. There is also a railway station in Barneville located between the town and the harbour bridge.

=== Shellfish ===
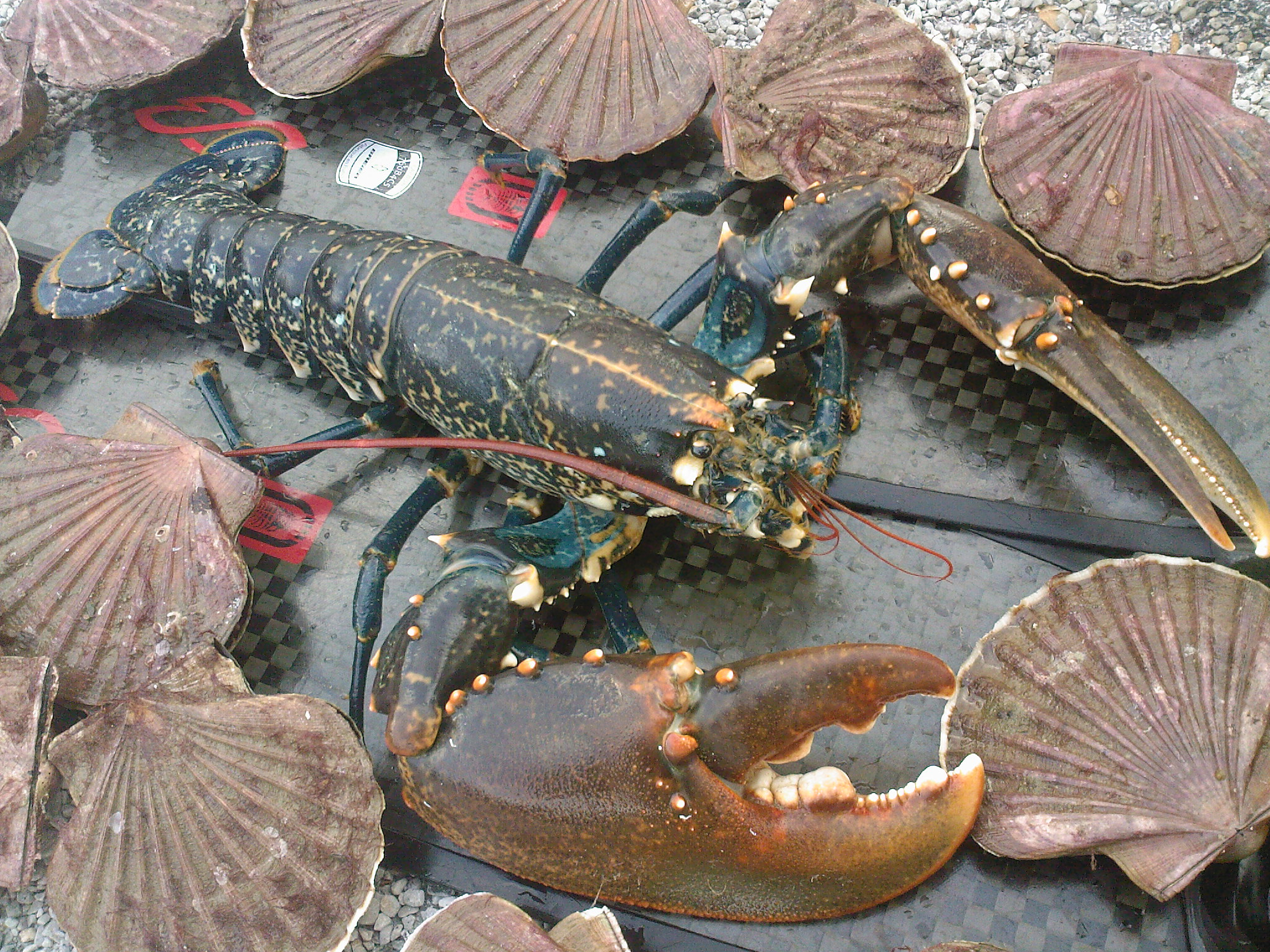
The Carteret Lobster

Barneville Beach and the foreshore of Cape Carteret at low tide are ideal places for recreational fishing. The popular and famous species in this area are:

- Brown crabs;
- Velvet crabs;
- European Lobsters;
- Common Prawns;
- Common periwinkles;
- Common slipper limpet;
- Sea Spiders (Maja brachydactyla).

=== Civil heritage ===
- The Hamlet of Landes.
- Rue des Ormes: old houses of sea captains.
- Carteret Manor (18th century)
- The Château des Sirènes, built for and inhabited by the painter Adolphe Lalyre then sold to Henry Franklin-Bouillon.
- The Village du Tôt and the Lavoir (Public Laundry) of Mère Denis. Mère Denis (Jeanne Marie Le Calvé) settled here and ran a laundry. She was noticed in 1972 by the publicists for the brand "Vedette" who gave her the nickname Mère Denis and publicised the Village du Tôt.
- The Neire Mâove Schooner
- Stations of the Cotentin tourist train
- The Fishing port and marina

The commune has several buildings and sites that are registered as historical monuments:

- The Graffard Manor (1575)
- The former Corps de Garde (1745)
- The Carteret Lighthouse (1837)

A Railway Carriage called "Bruhat" No. BB44586 (19th century) is registered as an historical object.

=== Religious heritage ===
- Saint-Germain-Le-Scot Church in Carteret (20th century)
- The former Saint Louis Church in Carteret
- The remains of the ancient Saint-Germain-Le-Scot Church in Carteret.
- The Saint-Germain of Barneville Church (12th century) is registered as an historical monument

The Church contains two items that are registered as historical objects:

- The main Altar, Altar seating, Tabernacle and base (18th century)
- 6 Stained glass windows (1935)

=== Environmental heritage ===
- The Hatainville dunes.
- Cape Carteret
- The Biard Rock at the end of the cape
- The Masse de Romont altitude 99 m.
- The Gerfleur Estuary
- La Potinière Beach
- The Old Church Beach
- The Mielles Carteret, also called "The Sand Sea".
- The Petit Puits Cliffs at Muret

== Notable people linked to the commune ==
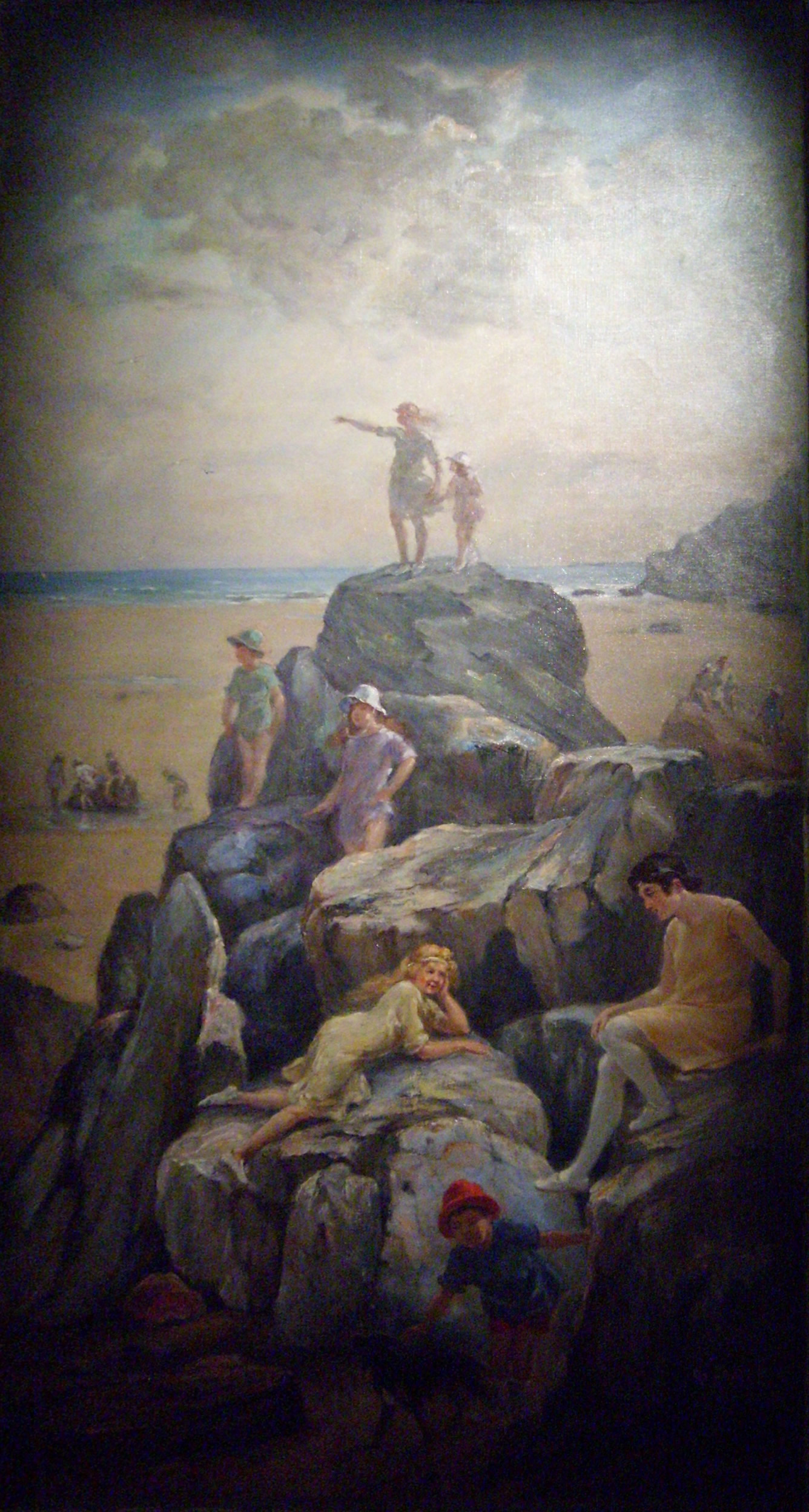
The beach at Carteret by Adolphe Lalyre.

- The Carteret Family
- Stéphane Marie, presenter of the TV programme Silence, ça pousse ! on France 5 was originally from Barneville.
- Nicolas Dutot (1684–1741), economist, one of the fathers of the quantitative study of economic phenomena, born in Barneville-sur-Mer in the village du Tôt on 12 October 1684.
- Jules Barbey d'Aurevilly (1808–1889), French writer, lived in Carteret during his youth and during his writings.
- Adolphe Lalyre, (1848–1933), painter, lived for a long period at Carteret and painted the coast.
- Jeanne Marie Le Calvé, called Mère Denis (1893–1989), advertisement character, was a washerwoman in a lavoir in Gerfleur at the Village du Tôt in Barneville-sur-Mer where she was filmed in a commercial that made her famous
- Édouard Lebas (1897–1975 at Carteret), prefect and French politician
- Clément Rosset, born at Carteret on 12 October 1939, philosopher
- Pierre Bameul, born at Barneville-sur-Mer on 10 November 1940, writer of science fiction
- Laurent Cesne, star chef at the Hôtel de la marine and author of a book on Iodine in the kitchen
- Jean Barros, Historian of the canton, author of books on the heritage of Tôt.
- Roger de Barneville (11th)
- Théodore de Barneville (12th)
- Michel Noël (1754–1809), politician
- Nicolas Noël-Agnès (1794–1866), politician
- Marie-Louise Giraud (1903–1943), born at Barneville, guillotined abortionist
- François Le Cannellier (-1933), vice-admiral
- Clara Ward
- Arsène Reynaud de Barbarin (1833–1913), naval officer, lived in the commune
- Jeanne Provost (1887–1980), comedian, owner of the old presbytery
- Paul-Jacques Bonzon (1908–1978), French writer

== See also ==
- Communes of the Manche department
