= Port-Bail-sur-Mer =

- Commune
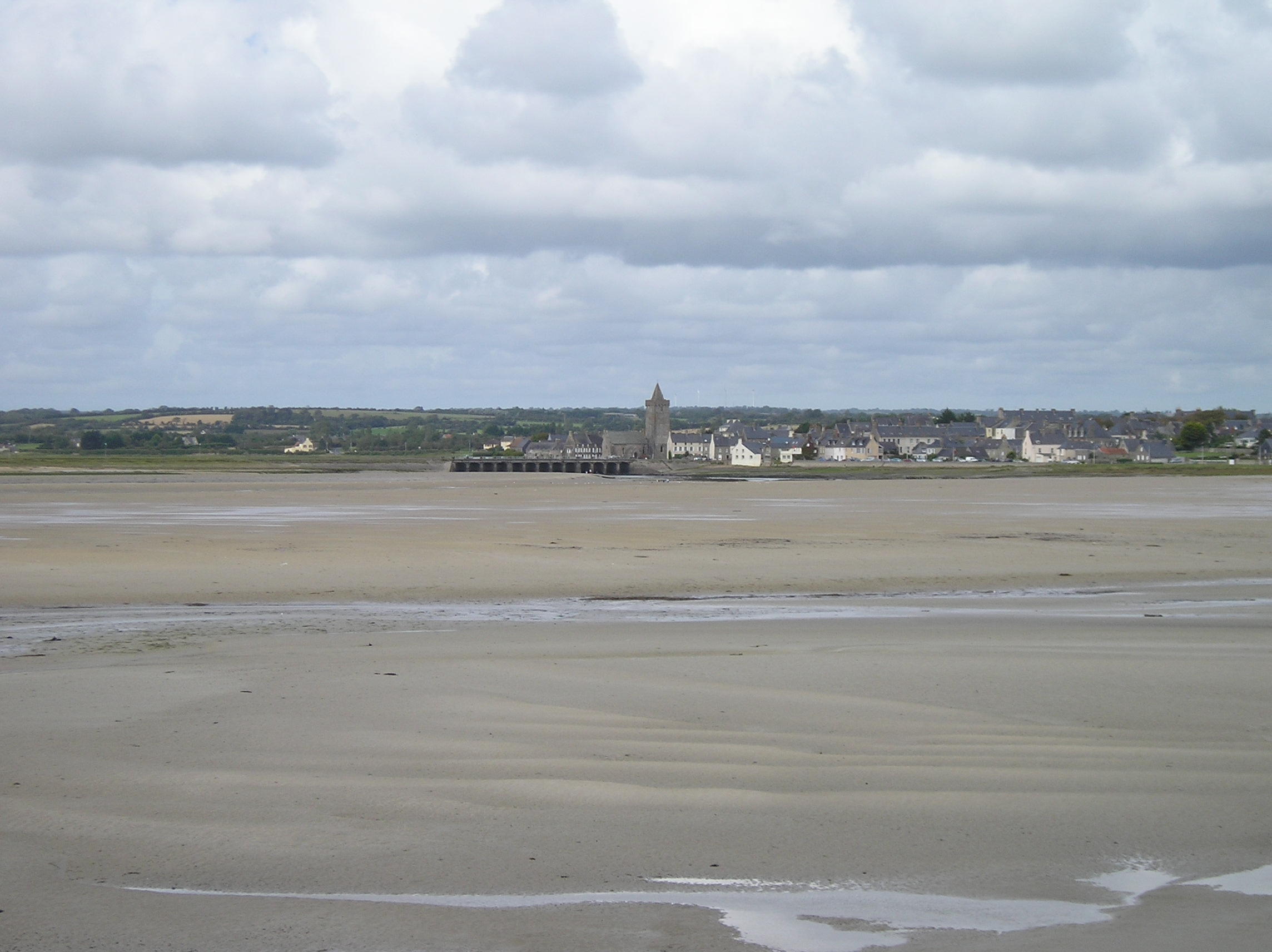
- View of Portbail
- Location of Port-Bail-sur-Mer
- Location within France Location within Normandy
- Coordinates: 49°20′10″N 1°41′41″W
- Country: France
- Region: Normandy
- Department: Manche
- Arrondissement: Cherbourg
- Canton: Les Pieux
- Intercommunality: CA Cotentin

Government
  - Mayor (2023–2026): Frédérique Boury
- Area^{1}: 38.50 km^{2} (14.86 sq mi)
- Highest elevation: 90 m (300 ft)
- Lowest elevation: 2 m (6.6 ft)
- Population (2023): 2,520
  - Density: 65.5/km^{2} (170/sq mi)
- Time zone: UTC+01:00 (CET)
  - Summer (DST): UTC+02:00 (CEST)
- INSEE/Postal code: 50412 /50580
- Website: www.portbail.fr
- ^{1} French Land Register data, which excludes lakes, ponds, glaciers > 1 km^{2} (0.386 sq mi or 247 acres) and river estuaries.

Port-Bail-sur-Mer (French pronunciation: [pɔʁ baj syʁ mɛʁ]) is a commune in the Manche department in north-western France. It was established on 1 January 2019 by merger of the former communes of Portbail (the seat), Denneville and Saint-Lô-d'Ourville.

== Population ==
Population data refer to the area corresponding with the commune as of January 2025.

Historical population
Year	Pop.	±% p.a.
1968	2,385	—
1975	2,451	+0.39%
1982	2,570	+0.68%
1990	2,500	−0.34%
1999	2,631	+0.57%
2007	2,740	+0.51%
2012	2,740	+0.00%
2017	2,588	−1.13%
2023	2,520	−0.44%
Source: INSEE

== Notable people ==
- René Fenouillière (1882 - 1916) - a footballer who played for Spanish clubs RCD Espanyol & FC Barcelona after starting at local club US Avranches was born here in Portbail.

== See also ==
- Communes of the Manche department
