= Saint-Lô-d'Ourville =

- Part of Port-Bail-sur-Mer
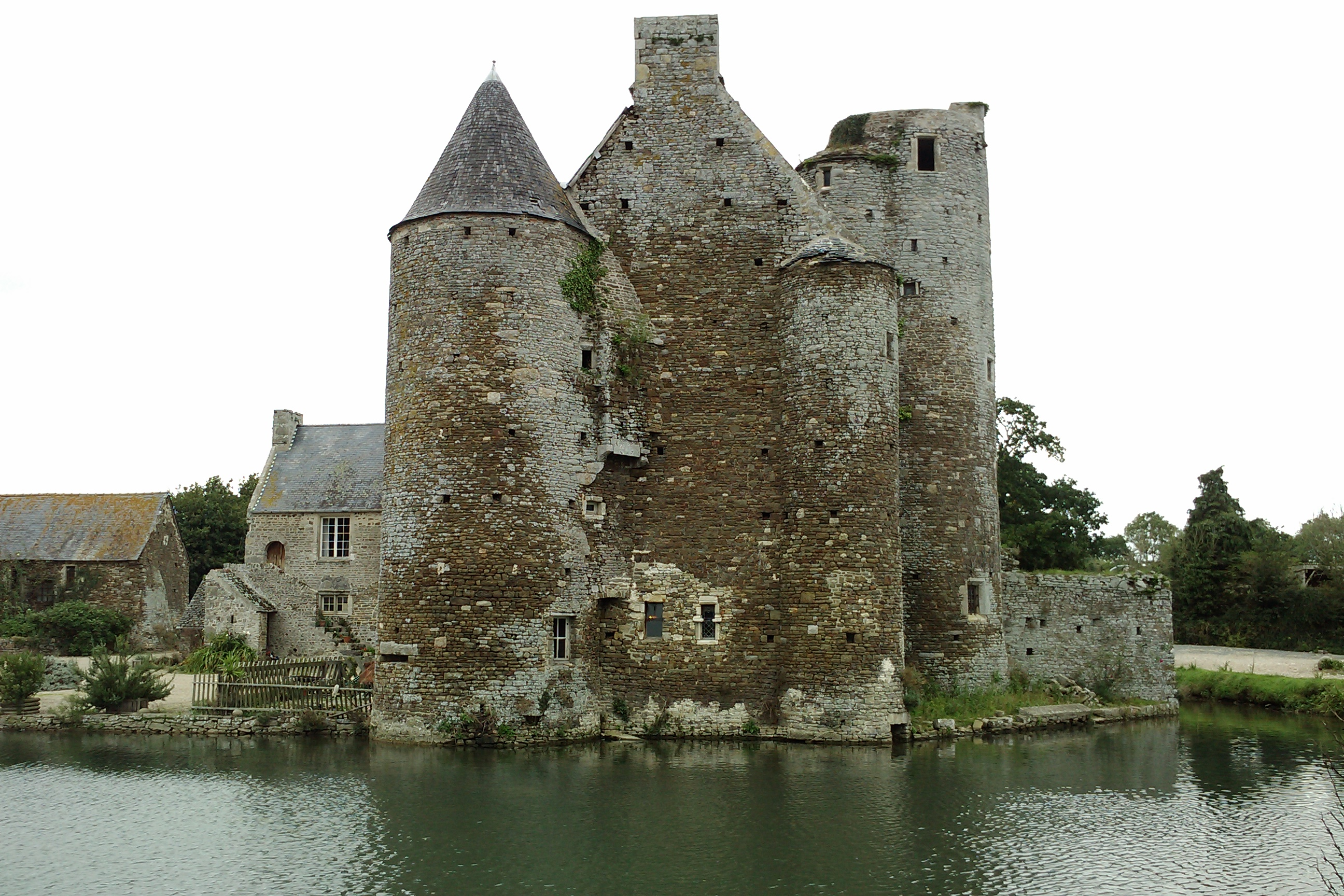
- Parc manor

- Coat of arms
- Location of Saint-Lô-d'Ourville
- Location within France Location within Normandy
- Coordinates: 49°20′07″N 1°40′05″W
- Country: France
- Region: Normandy
- Department: Manche
- Arrondissement: Cherbourg
- Canton: Les Pieux
- Commune: Port-Bail-sur-Mer
- Area^{1}: 10.7 km^{2} (4.1 sq mi)
- Elevation: 25 m (82 ft)
- Population (2022): 480
  - Density: 45/km^{2} (120/sq mi)
- Time zone: UTC+01:00 (CET)
  - Summer (DST): UTC+02:00 (CEST)
- Postal code: 50580
- ^{1} French Land Register data, which excludes lakes, ponds, glaciers > 1 km^{2} (0.386 sq mi or 247 acres) and river estuaries.

Saint-Lô-d'Ourville (French pronunciation: [sɛ̃ lo duʁvil]) is a former commune in the Manche department in Normandy in north-western France. On 1 January 2019, it was merged into the new commune Port-Bail-sur-Mer.

The Port of Portbail seen from the Lindbergh dunes.

Lindbergh Beach and dunes.

== Heraldry ==
Arms of Saint-Lô-d'Ourville	The arms of Saint-Lô-d'Ourville are blazoned : Azure, a swan argent beaked and membered gules, on a chief Or, 3 martlets sable.

== See also ==
- Communes of the Manche department
