= Clément Rosset =

French philosopher and writer (1939–2018)

- Born: 12 October 1939; Barneville-Carteret, France
- Died: 28 March 2018 (aged 78); Paris, France

Philosophical work
- Era: Contemporary philosophy
- Region: Western Philosophy
- School: Postmodern philosophy continental philosophy
- Main interests: Metaphysics, Ethics

Clément Rosset (French: [klemɑ̃ ʁɔsɛ]; 12 October 1939 – 28 March 2018) was a French philosopher and writer. He was a professor of philosophy at the University of Nice Sophia Antipolis, and the author of books on 20th-century philosophy and postmodern philosophy.

== Early life ==
Rosset was born on 12 October 1939 in Barneville-Carteret, France. He graduated from the École Normale Supérieure, and he passed the agrégation of philosophy in 1965.

== Career ==
Rosset taught French at the Université de Montréal in Quebec, Canada for two years. He was a professor of philosophy at the University of Nice Sophia Antipolis in Nice, France until his retirement in the late 1990s.

The bulk of his work consists in some 30 short books, all of them brief studies or essays on various topics. Most popular is probably Le réel et son double, that deals in an original manner with the inevitably illusionistic character of representations. Arthur Schopenhauer, on whom Rosset has published a few studies, remains a constant reference throughout his works. The fight with depression introduced a more personal strain in the later writings of Clément Rosset.

== Death ==
Rosset died on 28 March 2018 in Paris, France.

== Publications ==
In English:

- Joyful Cruelty: Toward a Philosophy of the Real (Free Association, 2010, ISBN 978-0-9796121-1-4)
- The Real and its Double (The University of Chicago Press, 2012, ISBN 978-0-8574203-4-3)

In French:

- La Philosophie tragique, Paris, Presses Universitaires de France, 1960 ISBN 213054066X
- Le Monde et ses remèdes, Paris, Presses universitaires de France, Paris, 1964 ISBN 213050941X
- Lettre sur les chimpanzés : plaidoyer pour une humanité totale, Paris, Éditions Gallimard, 1965, reprint 1999 ISBN 2070755282
- Schopenhauer, philosophe de l'absurde, Paris, Presses universitaires de France, 1967, 2010 ISBN 978-2-13-058350-9
- L'Esthétique de Schopenhauer, Paris, Presses universitaires de France, 1969 ISBN 2130421296
- (under the pseudonym Roboald Marcas) Précis de philosophie moderne, Paris, R. Laffont, 1968, reprint. Écrits satiriques 1, Paris, Presses universitaires de France, 2008 ISBN 9782130570844
- (under the pseudonym Roger Crémant) Les matinées structuralistes, suivies d'un Discours sur l'écrithure (sic), Paris, R. Laffont, 1969, partial reprint : Les Matinées savantes, Montpellier, Éditions Fata Morgana, 2011 ISBN 9782851948076
- Logique du pire : éléments pour une philosophie tragique, Paris, Presses Universitaires de France, series Bibliothèque de philosophie contemporaine, 1971 ISBN 2130450563
- L'Anti-nature : éléments pour une philosophie tragique, Paris, Presses Universitaires de France, 1973 ISBN 2130539572
- Le Réel et son double : essai sur l'illusion, Paris, Gallimard, 1976 ISBN 2070327515
- Le Réel : Traité de l'idiotie, Paris, Éditions de Minuit, 1977 ISBN 2707318647
- L'Objet singulier, Paris, Éditions de Minuit, 1979, ISBN 2707302856
- La Force majeure, Paris, Éditions de Minuit, 1983 ISBN 2707306584
- Le Philosophe et les sortilèges, Paris, Éditions de Minuit, 1985 ISBN 2707310115
- Le Principe de cruauté, Paris, Éditions de Minuit, 1988 ISBN 2707311804
- Mozart, une folie de l'allégresse, Paris, Mercure de France, 1990, reprint Le cas Mozart, Le Passeur, 2013 (written by Rosset and Didier Raymond) (ISBN 2368900381)
- Principes de sagesse et de folie, Paris, Éditions de Minuit, 1991 ISBN 2707314021
- En ce temps-là - Notes sur Louis Althusser, Paris, Éditions de Minuit, 1992 ISBN 2707314277
- Matière d'art : hommages, Nantes, Le Passeur, 1992, rééd. Montpellier, Fata Morgana, 2010 ISBN 9782851947741
- Le Choix des mots, Paris, Éditions de Minuit, 1995 ISBN 2707315397
- Le Démon de la tautologie, Paris, Éditions de Minuit, 1997 ISBN 2707316156
- Route de nuit : épisodes cliniques, Paris, Gallimard, 1999 ISBN 2070756181
- Le Réel, l'imaginaire et l'illusoire, Biarritz, Distance, 2000 ISBN 2908960125 (reissued in Fantasmagories, Paris, Éditions de Minuit, 2005)
- Loin de moi : étude sur l'identité, Paris, Éditions de Minuit, 2001 ISBN 2707316911
- Le Régime des passions, Paris, Éditions de Minuit, 2001 ISBN 2707317640
- Propos sur le cinéma, Paris, Presses universitaires de France, 2001 ISBN 2130520219
- Franchise postale [correspondence with Michel Polac], Presses universitaires de France, 2003 ISBN 2130537405
- Impressions fugitives : L'ombre, le reflet, l'écho, Paris, Éditions de Minuit, 2004 ISBN 2707318531
- Fantasmagories, Paris, Éditions de Minuit, 2005 ISBN 2707319384
- L'École du réel, Paris, Éditions de Minuit, 2008 ISBN 2-7073-2019-6 [anthology]
- La Nuit de mai, Paris, Éditions de Minuit, 2008 ISBN 2-7073-2020-X.
- Une passion homicide, Paris, Presses universitaires de France, 2008 ISBN 2-13-056540-9
- Le Monde perdu, Éditions Fata Morgana, 2009 ISBN 978-2-85194-746-8 BnF 42798306n
- Tropiques. Cinq conférences mexicaines, Paris, Éditions de Minuit, 2010 ISBN 9782707321077
- La folie sans peine, written by Didier Raymond [édition originale : Points, 1991] et remanié par l'auteur, dessins de Jean-Charles Fitoussi, PUF, 2010 ISBN 9782130581017
- Récit d'un noyé, Paris, Éditions de Minuit, 2012 ISBN 9782707322395
- L'Invisible, Paris, Éditions de Minuit, 2012 ISBN 9782707322388
- Question sans réponse [postface to Santiago Espinosa, L'inexpressif musical, Encre Marine, 2013] (ISBN 2350880664)
- Faits divers, Paris, PUF, Perspectives critiques, 2013 ISBN 9782130625568
- Esquisse biographique. Entretiens avec Santiago Espinosa, Encre Marine, 2017 (ISBN 9782350881232)
- L'endroit du paradis. Trois études. Paris, Les Belles Lettres, 2018 (ISBN 2350881474)

=== Bibliography ===
- Marc Alpozzo, Le langage du réel ou de la tautologie selon Clément Rosset, Les Carnets de la Philosophie, n°12, July–August–September 2010, read online
- Roxanne Breton, L'unique et le double : la répétition et la joie dans l'œuvre de Clément Rosset, Dialogue: Canadian Philosophical Review, vol.55/2, 2016
- Sébastien Charles, La philosophie française en questions. Interviews with Comte-Sponville, Conche, Ferry, Lipovetsky, Onfray et Rosset, Paris, Le Livre de Poche, 2004, read online
- Jacques Dewitte, Le réel simple ou double. Sur l' "ontologie du réel" de Clément Rosset, Critique n°730, 2008, p. 173-191
- Rafael Del Hierro, La filosofia tragica. Aprobacion de lo real y critica del doble. Thèse de doctorat, Madrid, 1995 (édition numérique)
- Rafael Del Hierro, Rosset y los filosofos. Estudios sobre Schopenhauer y Nietzsche, 2014 (édition numérique)
- Rafael Del Hierro, Rosset (1939), Madrid, Ediciones del Orto, 2001
- Denis Lejeune, The philosophy of Clément Rosset (in The Radical Use of Chance in 20th Century Art, Amsterdam, Rodopi, 2012)
- Olga del Pilar Lopez-Betancur, La philosophie tragique chez Clément Rosset : un regard sur le réel. Thèse de doctorat, Paris, 2014, read online
- Pierre-Yves Macé, Photo-, phono- et cinématographie chez Clément Rosset, Labyrinthe n°36-1, 2011, read online
- Philippe Mengue, Clément Rosset : de la pensée du simple à l'allégresse, Critique, n°409-410, 1981, p. 595-619
- Jean Tellez, La joie et le tragique. Introduction à la pensée de Clément Rosset, Éditions Germina, 2009
- Stéphane Vinolo, Clément Rosset, la philosophie comme anti-ontologie, L'Harmattan, 2012
- Santiago Espinosa (2013). "D'une lecture aveuglante". Atelier Clément Rosset (in French).
- Jean-Charles Fitoussi : De la musique ou la jota de Rosset (2013) (documentary)
