= René Fenouillière =

French footballer (1882-1916)

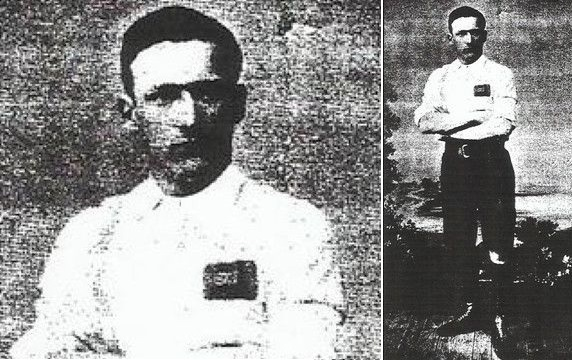
- René Fenouillère in 1903

Personal information
- Date of birth: 22 October 1882
- Place of birth: Portbail, France
- Date of death: 4 November 1916 (aged 34)
- Place of death: Reims, France
- Position: Midfielder

Senior career*
Years	Team	Apps	(Gls)
- US Avranches
1902–1903	RCD Espanyol		
1903	FC Barcelona	3	(0)
1904–1906	Racing Club de France		
1906–1914	Red Star F.C.		

International career
1908	France	1	(0)
- * Club domestic league appearances and goals

René Victor Fenouillière (22 October 1882 – 4 November 1916) was a French footballer who played for Spanish clubs RCD Espanyol and FC Barcelona. He competed for France in the men's tournament at the 1908 Summer Olympics. He is best known for being the first French player to wear the FC Barcelona shirt when he played for them in 1903. He was killed in action during World War I.

== Club career ==
Born in Portbail (Lower Normandy) on 22 October 1882, René began his football career with l’Union Sportive Avranches, before going to England to study, where he played mostly rugby football. However, he never forgot how to play football, and in 1902 he joined the Spanish club RCD Espanyol, where he was recognized as a top-class midfielder. So much so that on 8 March 1903, after a great performance against FC Barcelona in a 2–2 draw at the Horta in the Copa Barcelona, the magazine Los Deportes described as being at the same level as Joan Gamper.

Interestingly, just two days later, Espanyol loaned him to Barcelona and he played his first game with them against a team made up of the crew of the Galliope, an English ship anchored in the Barcelona port, helping his side to a 1–0 win and thus becoming the very first French player to wear the FC Barcelona shirt. He played only two more games after that, a 3–2 win over Salut on 28 May, and an 8–2 win over Mataroni on 27 July, netting one goal on the latter, in which Mataroní only had seven players, and Barcelona lined up with eight.

After his time at Barça, Rene Fenouillère played for the Parisian clubs Racing Club de France and Red Star F.C.

== International career ==
He represented the France national team at the 1908 Summer Olympics in London, featuring in one games against Denmark on 22 October in a resounding 17–1 defeat.

== Death ==
In World War I, René joined his old club US Avranches for a friendly match against the allied troops. During World War I, he fought with the French army, joining the 2º Régiment d’Infanterie and was wounded in 1915. He recovered and returned to the fighting, but was later killed at the front, north of Reims on 4 November 1916.

== Legacy ==
His first clubs stadium, US Avranches, was renamed after him in the 1930's.

== Honours ==
FC Barcelona

- Copa Barcelona
  - Champions: 1902–03

== See also ==
- List of Olympians killed in World War I
