= Saint-Jean-de-la-Rivière =

- Commune
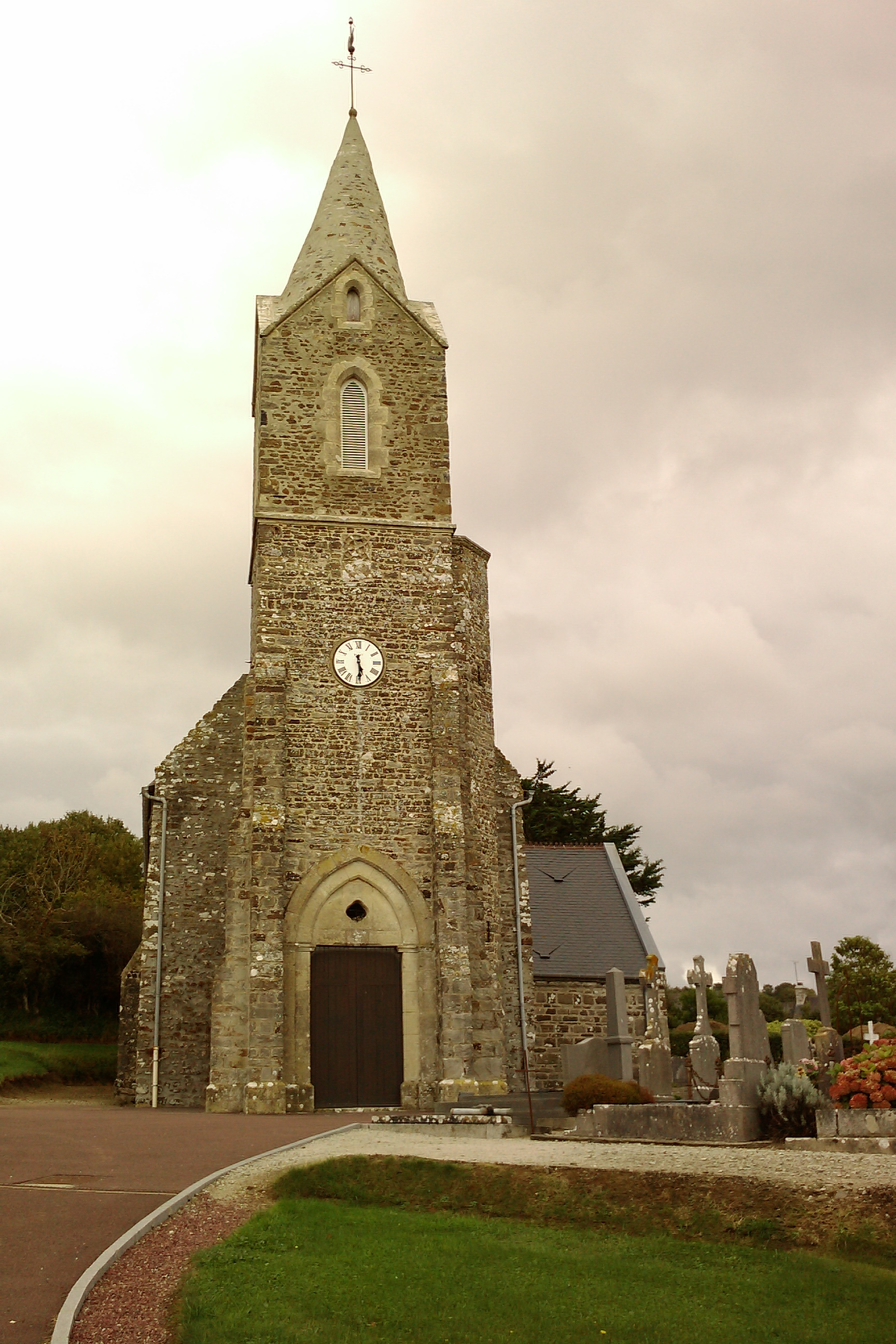
- The church of Saint-Jean de Turgeville

- Coat of arms
- Location of Saint-Jean-de-la-Rivière
- Location within France Location within Normandy
- Coordinates: 49°22′16″N 1°44′14″W
- Country: France
- Region: Normandy
- Department: Manche
- Arrondissement: Cherbourg
- Canton: Les Pieux
- Intercommunality: CA Cotentin

Government
  - Mayor (2020–2026): Francis Botta
- Area^{1}: 3.57 km^{2} (1.38 sq mi)
- Elevation: 20 m (66 ft)
- Population (2023): 363
  - Density: 102/km^{2} (263/sq mi)
- Time zone: UTC+01:00 (CET)
  - Summer (DST): UTC+02:00 (CEST)
- INSEE/Postal code: 50490 /50270
- ^{1} French Land Register data, which excludes lakes, ponds, glaciers > 1 km^{2} (0.386 sq mi or 247 acres) and river estuaries.

Saint-Jean-de-la-Rivière (French pronunciation: [sɛ̃ ʒɑ̃ də la ʁivjɛʁ]) is a commune in the Manche department in Normandy in north-western France.

== See also ==
- Communes of the Manche department
