= Denneville =

- Part of Port-Bail-sur-Mer
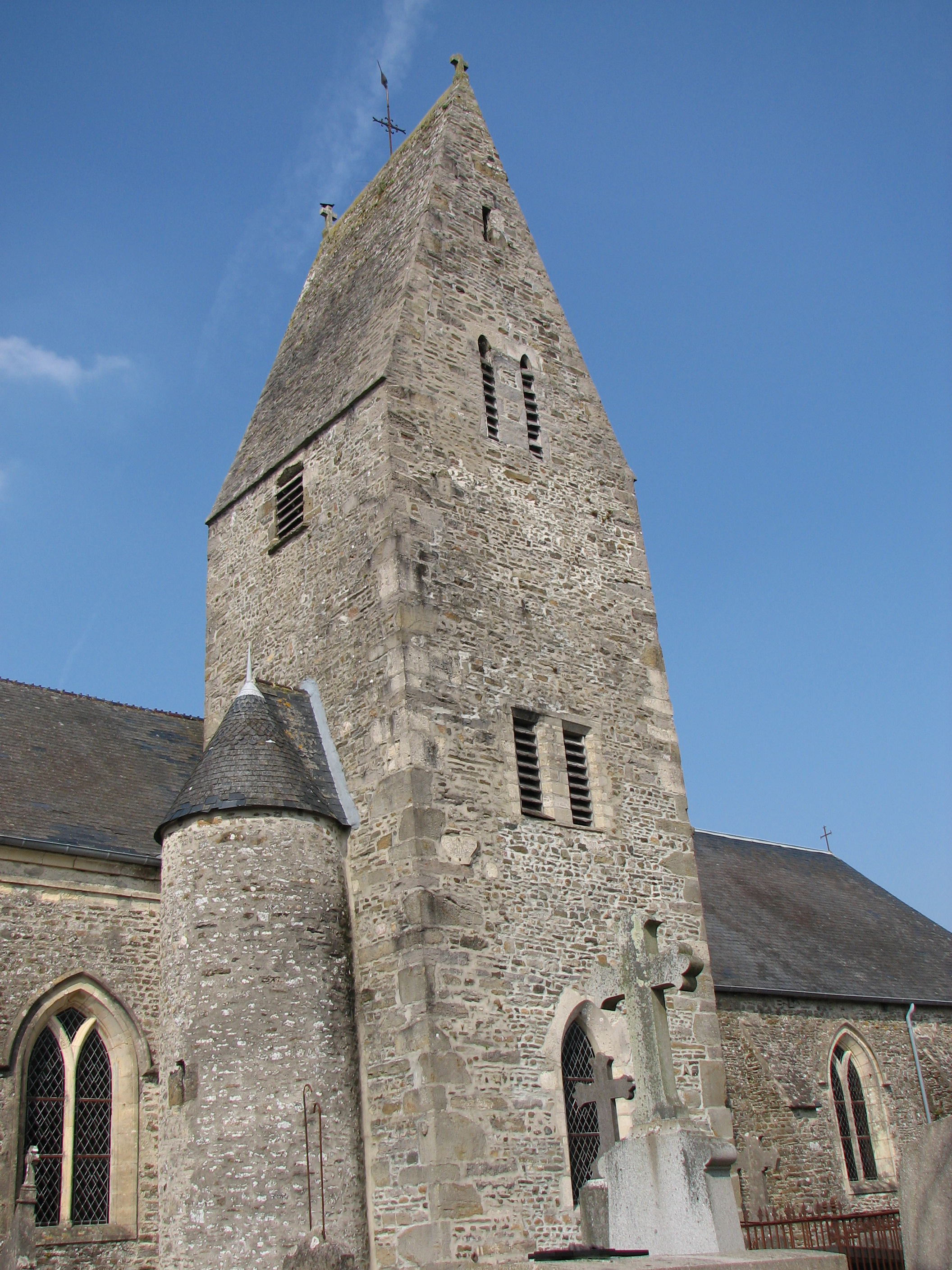
- The Denneville church

- Coat of arms
- Location of Denneville
- Location within France Location within Normandy
- Coordinates: 49°18′50″N 1°39′32″W
- Country: France
- Region: Normandy
- Department: Manche
- Arrondissement: Cherbourg
- Canton: Créances
- Commune: Port-Bail-sur-Mer
- Area^{1}: 8.24 km^{2} (3.18 sq mi)
- Elevation: 5 m (16 ft)
- Highest elevation: 38 m (125 ft)
- Lowest elevation: 4 m (13 ft)
- Population (2022): 550
  - Density: 67/km^{2} (170/sq mi)
- Time zone: UTC+01:00 (CET)
  - Summer (DST): UTC+02:00 (CEST)
- Postal code: 50580
- Website: www.denneville.fr
- ^{1} French Land Register data, which excludes lakes, ponds, glaciers > 1 km^{2} (0.386 sq mi or 247 acres) and river estuaries.

Denneville (French pronunciation: [dɛnvil]) is a former commune in the Manche department in north-western France. On 1 January 2019, it was merged into the new commune Port-Bail-sur-Mer.

== Heraldry ==
Arms of Denneville	The arms of Denneville are blazoned : Azure, a fess or between 3 roses argent. The arms are those of the Eustace de Denneville family, former lords and then proprietors of Denneville.

== See also ==
- Communes of the Manche department
