= Portbail =

- Part of Port-Bail-sur-Mer
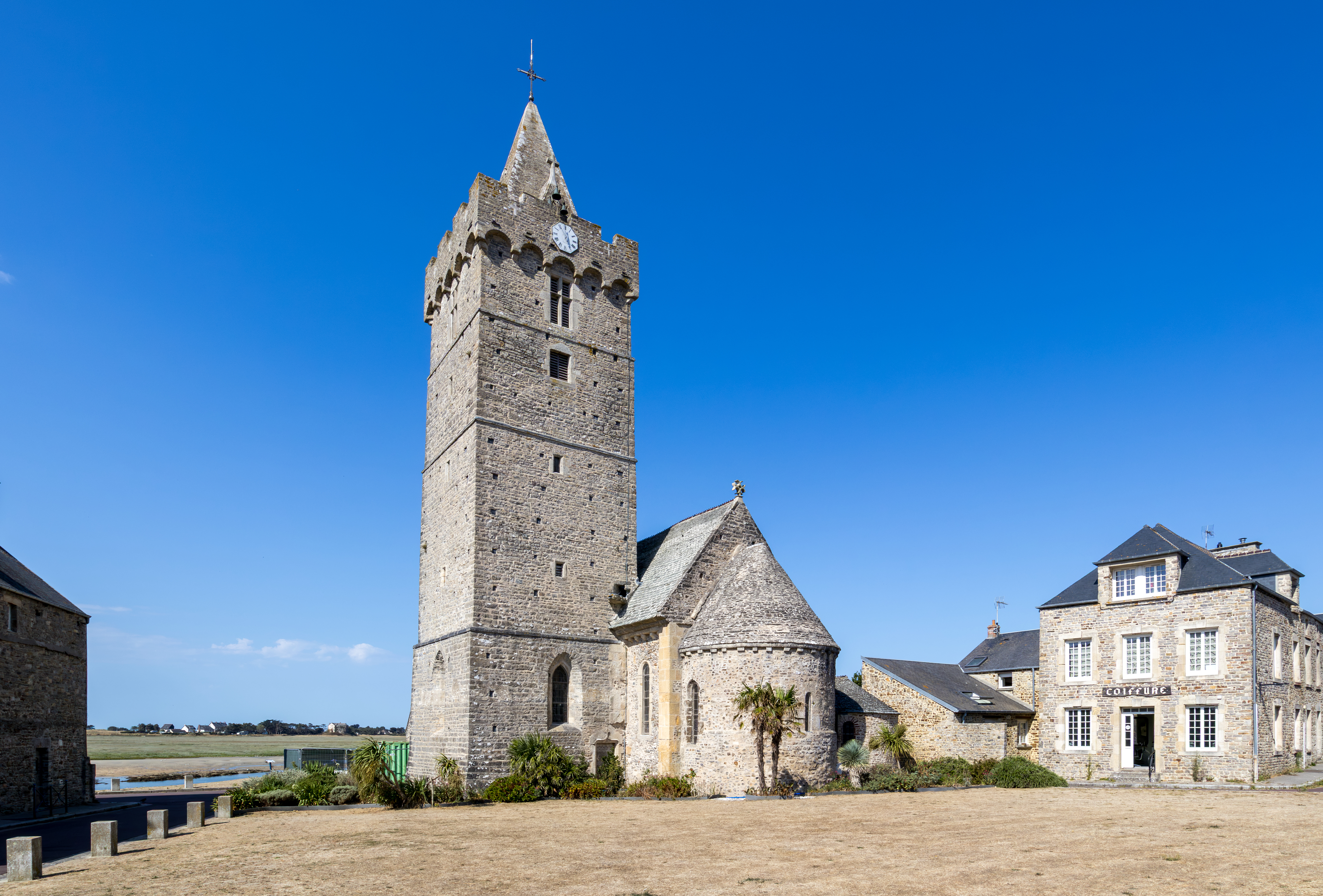
- Church of Our Lady of Portbail

- Coat of arms
- Location of Portbail
- Location within France Location within Normandy
- Coordinates: 49°20′10″N 1°41′41″W
- Country: France
- Region: Normandy
- Department: Manche
- Arrondissement: Cherbourg
- Canton: Les Pieux
- Commune: Port-Bail-sur-Mer
- Area^{1}: 19.56 km^{2} (7.55 sq mi)
- Elevation: 10 m (33 ft)
- Highest elevation: 90 m (300 ft)
- Lowest elevation: 2 m (6.6 ft)
- Population (2022): 1,492
  - Density: 76.28/km^{2} (197.6/sq mi)
- Demonym: Portbaillais
- Time zone: UTC+01:00 (CET)
  - Summer (DST): UTC+02:00 (CEST)
- Postal code: 50580
- Website: www.portbail.fr
- ^{1} French Land Register data, which excludes lakes, ponds, glaciers > 1 km^{2} (0.386 sq mi or 247 acres) and river estuaries.

Portbail (French pronunciation: [pɔʁbaj]; sometimes spelled Port-Bail) is a former commune in the Manche department in north-western France. On 1 January 2019, it was merged into the new commune Port-Bail-sur-Mer.

== Heraldry ==
The arms of Portbail are blazoned :
Azure, a chevron abased, between in fess 3 mullets Or and a lancehead argent.

The Port of Portbail seen from the Lindbergh dunes

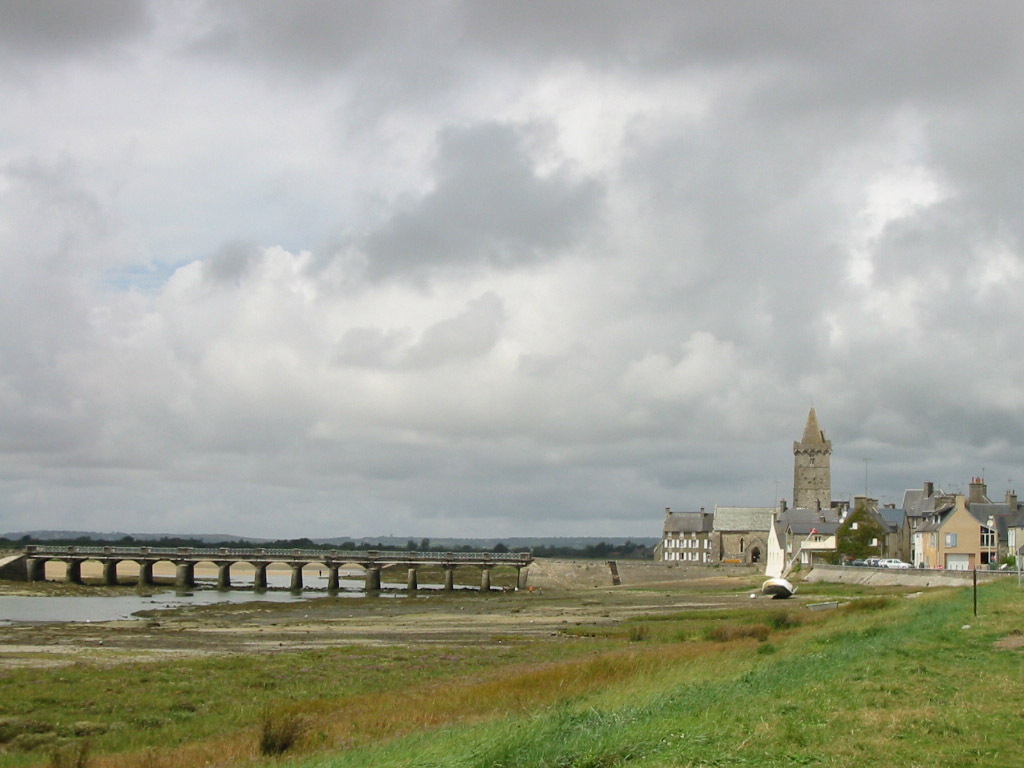
« Thirteen arches bridge»

== Demography ==
Historical population
Year	Pop.	±% p.a.
1962	1,431	—
1968	1,499	+0.78%
1975	1,591	+0.85%
1982	1,707	+1.01%
1990	1,654	−0.39%
1999	1,675	+0.14%
2022	1,492	−0.50%
Source: EHESS and INSEE

== See also ==
- Communes of the Manche department
