= List of museums in Jersey =

This is a list of museums in Jersey, Channel Islands.

== The list ==
Name	Image	Parish	Type	Summary
Jersey Museum and Art Gallery		St Helier	Local	Operated by Jersey Heritage
Hamptonne Country Life Museum		St Lawrence	Country life	Operated by Jersey Heritage, owned by the National Trust for Jersey
Jersey War Tunnels		St Lawrence	Military	Tunnels built by the occupying German forces from 1941 - 1945
Elizabeth Castle		St Helier	Castle	Operated by Jersey Heritage
Mont Orgueil		St Martin	Castle	Operated by Jersey Heritage
La Hougue Bie		Grouville	Local	Operated by Jersey Heritage
Pallot Heritage Steam Museum		Trinity	Railway	Operated by the L C Pallot Trust
Maritime Museum		St Helier	Maritime	Operated by Jersey Heritage
16 New Street		St Helier	Historic house	website, operated by the National Trust for Jersey
Le Moulin de Quétivel		St Peter	Mill	website, operated by the National Trust for Jersey
Le Moulin de Tesson		St Peter	Mill	website, operated by the National Trust for Jersey
Greve De Lecq Barracks		St Mary	Military	website, operated by the National Trust for Jersey
Battery Lothringen		St Brélade	Military	Some structures restored and operated by Channel Islands Occupation Society (Jersey) Limited
10.5 cm Coastal Defence Gun		St Brélade	Military	website, operated by Channel Islands Occupation Society (Jersey) Limited, located at La Corbière
The Channel Islands Military Museum		St Ouen	Military	website, operated by Damien Horn
