= New Street =

New Street may refer to:

- Birmingham New Street railway station, a railway station in Birmingham, UK
- New Street, Birmingham, a street in Birmingham, United Kingdom
- New Street, Brussels (Rue Neuve/Nieuwstraat), a street in Brussels, Belgium
- New Street (York), a street in York, United Kingdom
- New Street, Kent, England, a hamlet in Ash-cum-Ridley parish

See also:

- 16 New Street, a Georgian house in St Helier, owned by the National Trust for Jersey
