= Le Don Hilton =

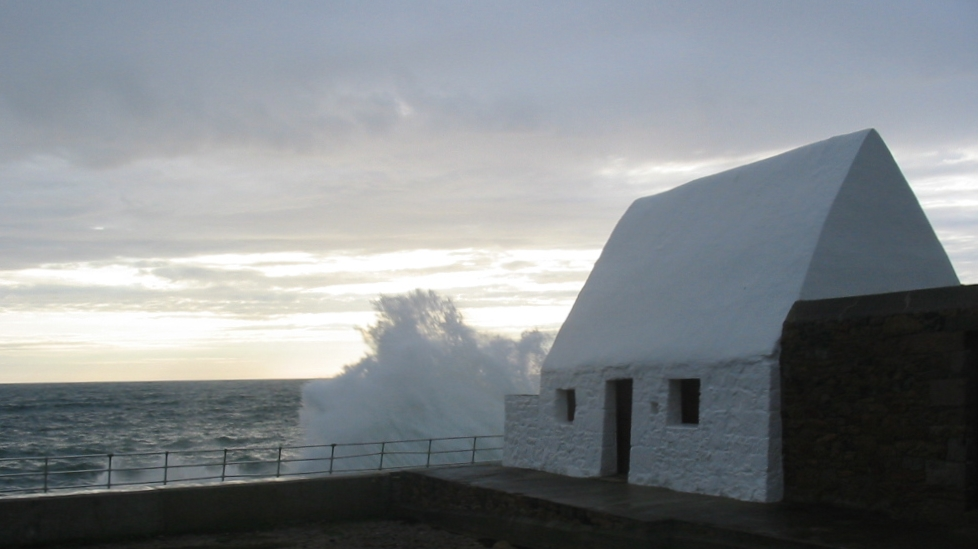
Le Don Hilton

Le Don Hilton or La Cauminne à Marie Best is an 18th-century guard house and powder magazine that sits on the seawall besides Le Chemin de L’Ouzière, in Saint Peter, Jersey. It is also known as "the White Cottage" because of its whitewashed walls and vault, and its distinctive appearance makes it an informal daymark for sailors. (Admiralty Chart 1137 does not identify the building as a recognised maritime marker.) Earlier names for the building include St. Peter’s Guardhouse and Magazine, the Middle Battery, and the Powder Magazine, among others. Today the National Trust for Jersey, which owns the building, calls it Le Don Hilton. The National Trust rents it out for occasions such as weddings and for overnight stays, though the facilities are minimal.

== History ==
The first mention of the building occurs in 1665, under the name of St. Peter’s Guard House and Magazine. At the time the parishes of Saint Ouen and Saint Peter shared the responsibility for the defence of the Bay. The original building blew up and the present building, with its stone vaulted roof, dates from 1765. Later it was known as Corps-de-Garde du Milieu dans la Baie de St Ouen and early C19 military reports refer to the building as the Middle Battery Magazine. It remained in use as a magazine until the end of the Napoleonic Wars in 1815.

In 1815, Marie Best and her children took refuge in the cottage during a smallpox epidemic. After Best died in 1832, the building fell into decay. The War Department sold the building to Mr. William Gregory on 21 November 1925.

Captain John Ashton Hilton acquired the cottage in 1932. In 1975, his widow, Mrs Marie Geneviève Hilton, donated the cottage, together with four vergées (a French acre), to the National Trust for Jersey. (The name "Le Don Hilton" means "the Hilton Gift".)

== Design ==
The building is primarily made of granite and concrete. The door and the right-hand window on the south side appear to be original. A second window was added later. The north side has a window with a surround made partly of brick, and probably dates to the late 19th or early 20th century. Lastly, the window on the west side, facing the sea, dates to the 20th century.

It is possible that the original building, i.e., the one that was replaced in 1765, had a thatched roof, as the Jèrriais word caumine translates to thatched cottage. However, the use of thatch for the roof of a magazine would seem improbable. It is possible that the building originally consisted of a guardroom, with chimney, and a magazine. (See for instance Le Couperon guardhouse and magazine.)

== Philately ==
Le Don Hilton features on the 42p stamp of a set of five stamps that Jersey Post issued in 2011, to mark the 75th anniversary of the National Trust for Jersey. It is also on the 75p issued that same year. In the 75p stamp the White Cottage is green, as the Trust painted the cottage green for 2011, as a gesture towards environmental awareness.

== Gallery ==
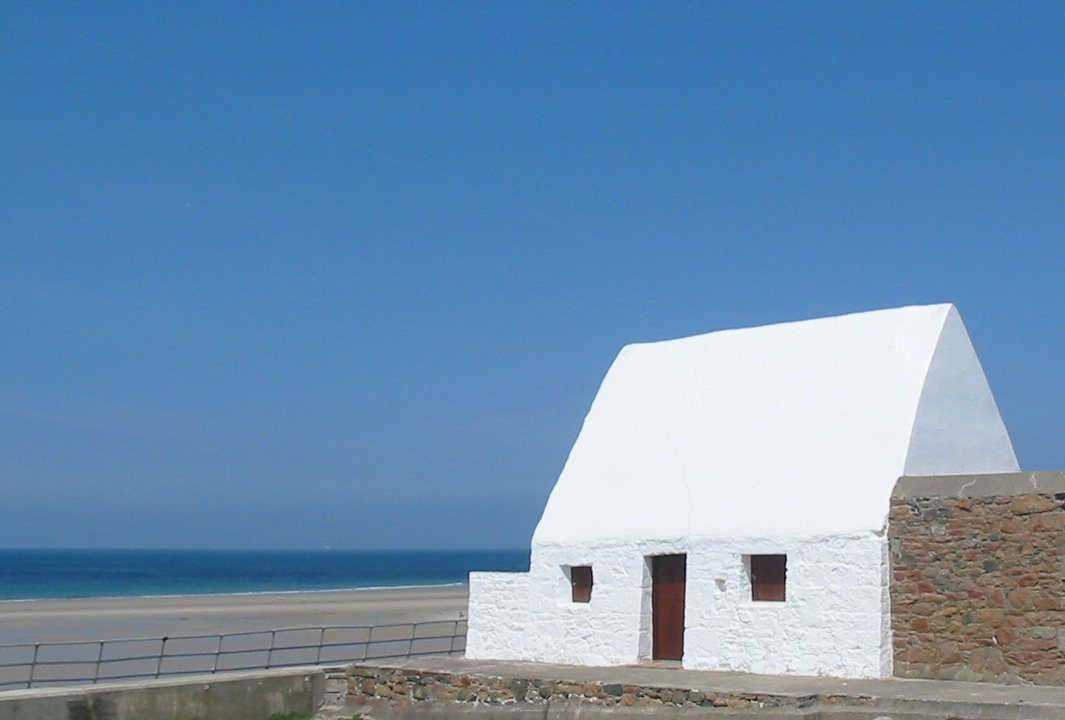

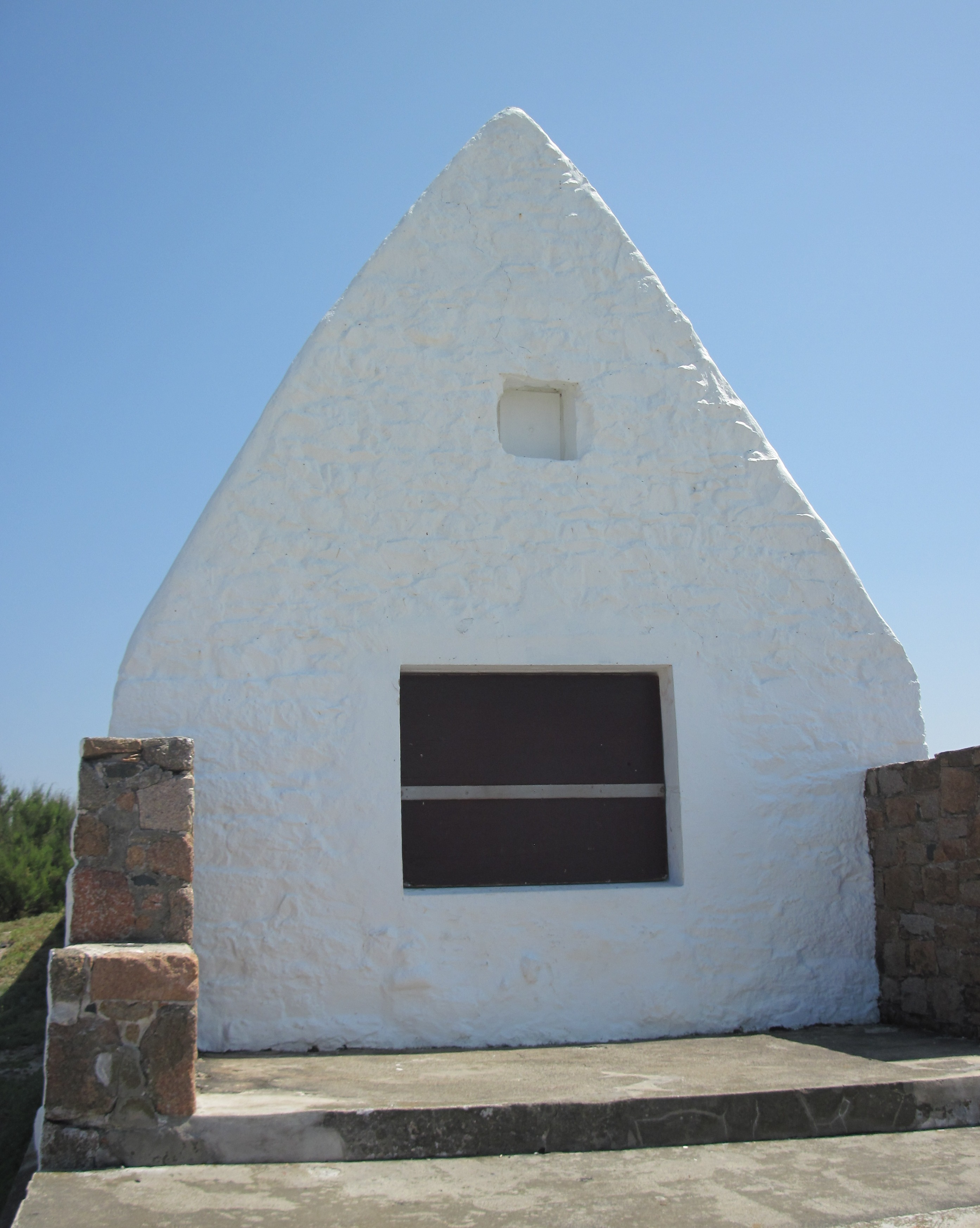

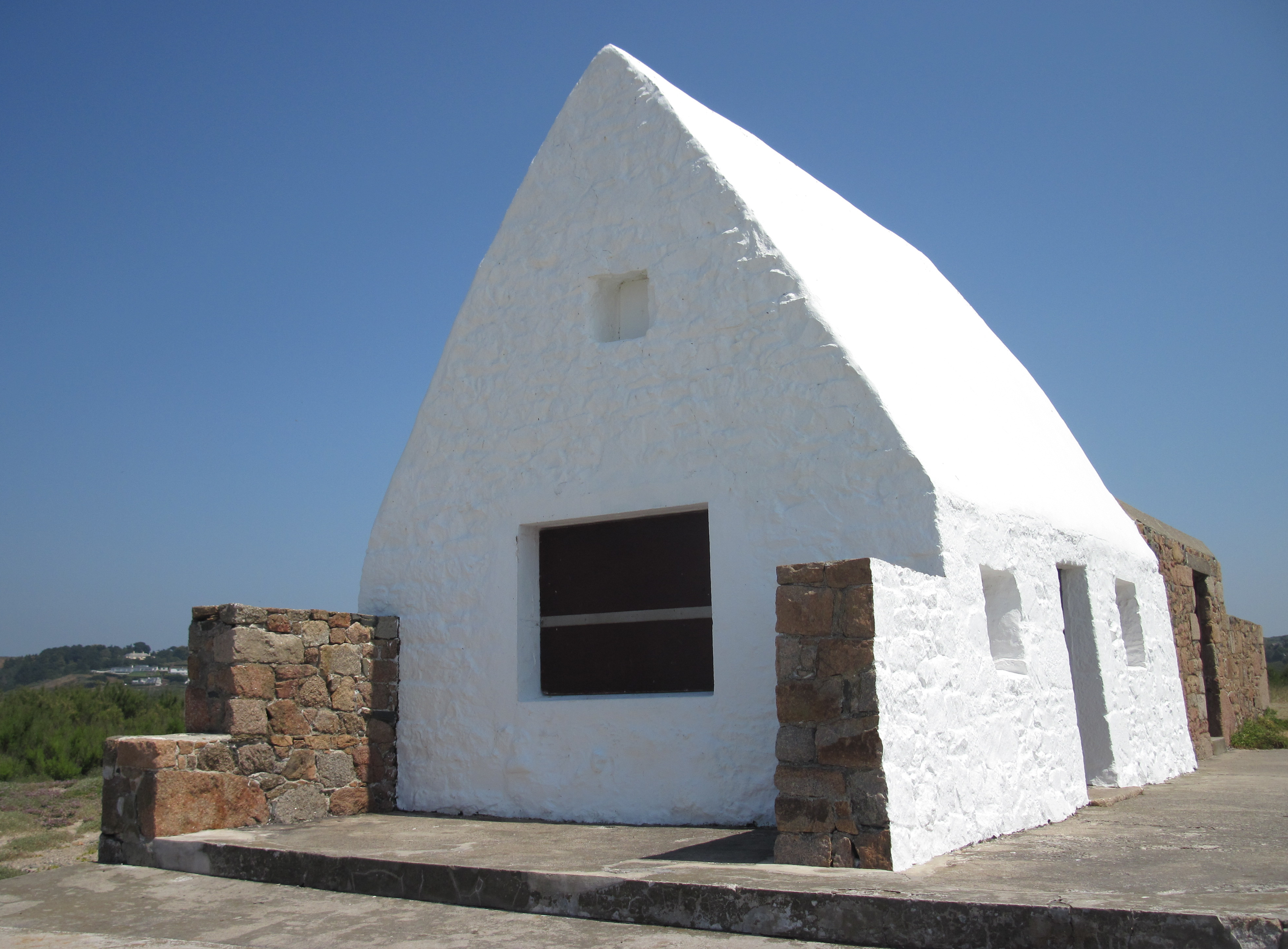

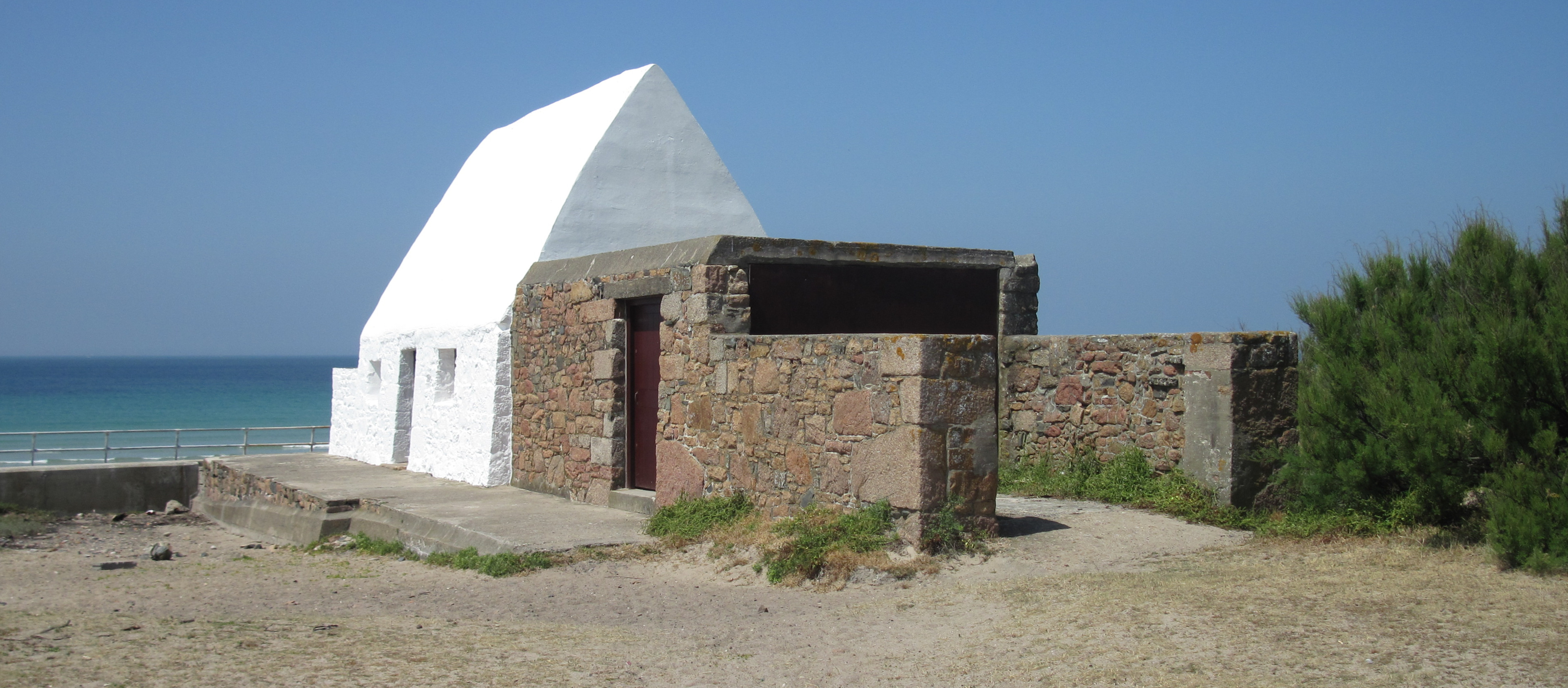
