= Vingtaine de la Vallée =

Vingtaine in Saint Lawrence, Jersey

Vingtaine de la Vallée is one of the six vingtaines of St Lawrence Parish on the Channel Island of Jersey.
