= Grève de Lecq Barracks =

Army Barracks

Coordinates: 49°14′45″N 2°11′57″W

Grève de Lecq Barracks is an army barracks in Jersey. Construction began in 1810 in response to the threat of invasion by the French. It functioned until 1926 and was acquired by the National Trust for Jersey in 1972. These barracks were unoccupied at the Census of 1921.

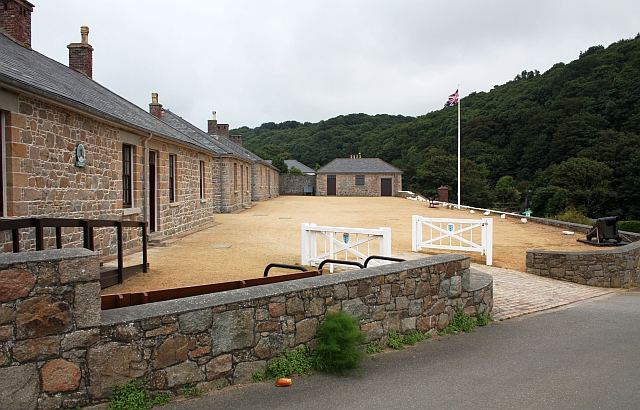
Greve de Lecq Barracks
