= 3–9 New Street =

Listed terrace in York, England

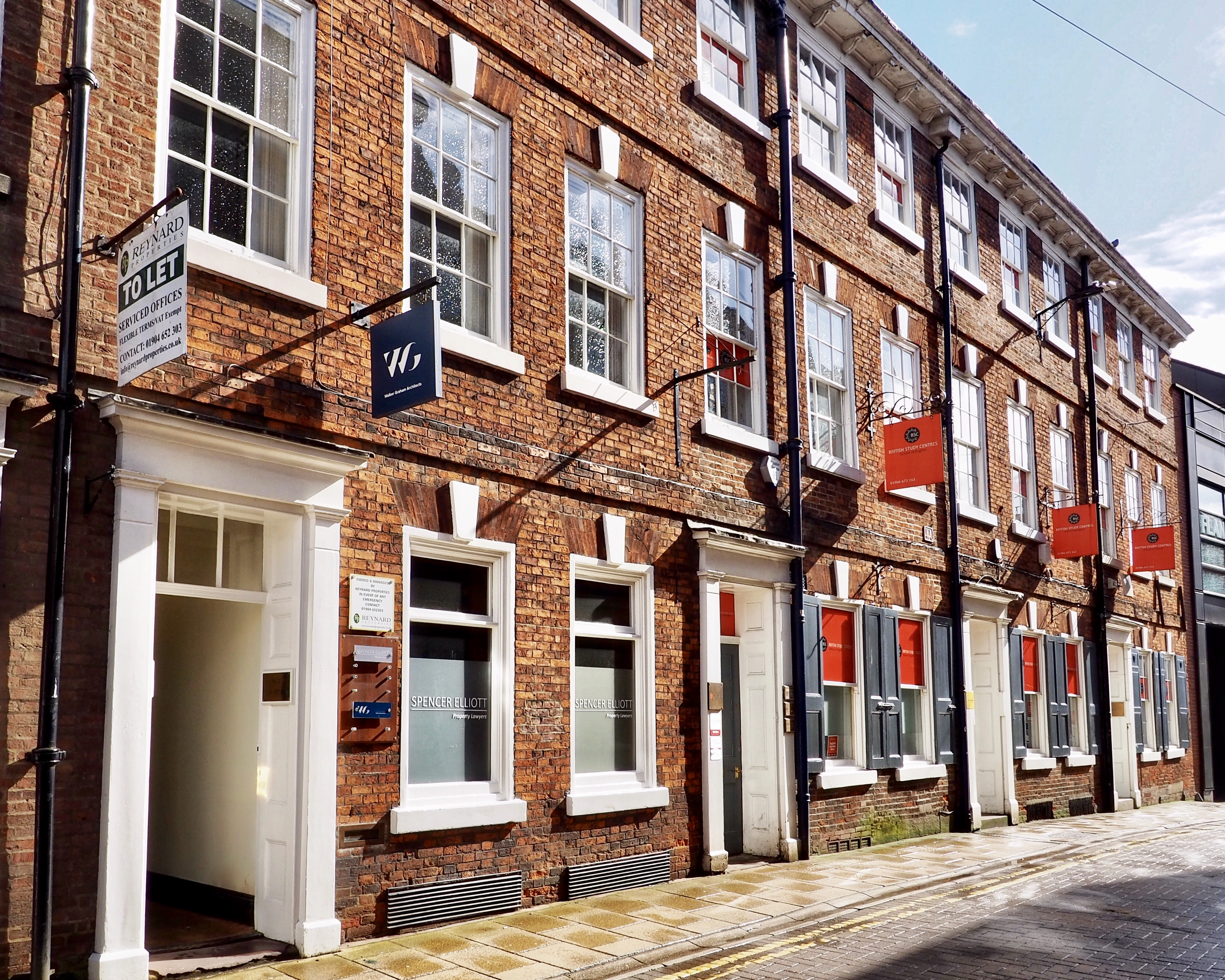
- The terrace in 2024
- Interactive map of the 3–9 New Street area
- Former names: Cumberland Row; 3–6 New Street

General information
- Status: Converted to offices (No. 3) and school (Nos. 5–9)
- Type: Houses (former)
- Location: New Street, York, England
- Coordinates: 53°57′35″N 1°05′00″W
- Year built: 1746; 280 years ago
- Renovated: Late 18th century (No. 9 extended); Early 19th and 20th centuries (altered)

Design and construction
- Designations

Listed Building – Grade II*
- Official name: 3–9, New Street
- Designated: 14 June 1954
- Reference no.: 1257093

3–9 New Street is a Grade II* listed terrace on New Street in the city of York, England. Built in 1746 on land formerly occupied by Davy Hall, it was originally known as Cumberland Row and comprised six houses, four of which survive. The terrace later became part of New Street and was at that time renumbered 3–6. No. 3 is now used as offices, while Nos. 5–9 have housed BSC York, an English language school, since 1996.

== History ==
The terrace stands on part of the former site of Davy Hall, which was demolished in 1745. A lease to build four houses, described as "all double, except against the churchyard which would not admit it", was granted to Charles Mitley, a carver, and John Theakston, a whitesmith. Theakston withdrew in January 1746, and Mitley, joined by his brother‑in‑law William Carr, a carpenter and joiner, went on to build six houses instead. The houses were being roofed in 1746 on the day the Duke of Cumberland passed through York after the Battle of Culloden, and the new terrace was named Cumberland Row in his honour.

Four of the original six houses survive. The terrace later became part of New Street, and the surviving section was numbered 3–6 at that time. No. 1 and what is now 16 Davygate were rebuilt in 1958–59 in a matching style.

On 14 June 1954, the terrace was designated a Grade II* listed building, and in 1968 the site was included within the newly established Central Historic Core conservation area. No. 3 is now occupied by offices, and since 1996 Nos. 5–9 have been the premises of BSC York, an English language school.

== Architecture ==
The front is built of orange‑red brick, with a timber cornice, and the right‑hand side wall is finished in red brick laid in a simple horizontal pattern. The roof has an M‑shaped form, covered in slate, with brick chimneys and four flat‑topped dormer windows; three of these have two‑part horizontal sliding windows with six panes in each part.

The building has three storeys plus a basement and attic level. The front has 12 windows in total, arranged as three per house. The basement openings are now filled in. Each house has either a four or six‑panel door with a divided window above it, set within a simple framed doorway with plain uprights, shaped imposts, an unadorned frieze and a moulded cornice.

Only No. 9 keeps its original 12‑pane ground‑floor windows; the others have single‑pane sashes or top‑hung replacements. All windows have painted stone sills, and all but No. 3 still have panelled shutters. On the first and second floors, the windows are 12‑pane sashes with painted stone sills. The ground and first‑floor windows have flat brick arches with painted stone keyblocks, and the doorways have broader versions of the same detail. Brick bands run across the front at first and second‑floor level. A moulded cornice sits at the eaves on shaped brackets, and an inverted bell‑shaped rainwater head dated "1784" stands to the left of No. 3.

The left‑hand side wall is three storeys, with four‑pane windows on each floor, all with stone sills and flat brick arches. The gable end is shaped and finished with a dentilled brick coping.

The right‑hand side wall has one round‑headed window with radial glazing between the first and second floors, and three attic windows above. A brick coping hides the valley between the roof slopes.

=== Interior ===
The interiors were not examined as part of the listing, but earlier records describe original staircases in each house. Those in Nos. 5 and 7 are lit from above and have two turned balusters on each step, shaped handrails and panelled wall linings. No. 3 includes a panelled front room on the ground floor with a decorative doorway and cornice. On the first floor it has a front room with panelling and a fireplace topped by a pedimented feature, and a rear room with one panelled wall, a similar fireplace, and doorways with pediments. The second floor contains original stone fireplaces.

No. 5 has a fully panelled ground‑floor room with a 19th‑century fireplace and an original cupboard with a rounded back and shaped shelving. Its first‑floor front room is also panelled, though now divided, and the fireplaces there are blocked.

No. 7 has a panelled front room on the ground floor with a fireplace and an overmantel with a bulging frieze, and a cupboard with a rounded top beside it. The first‑floor front room is fully panelled, with doorcases and a fireplace topped by an overmantel with a broken, swan‑neck pediment. The rear room has one panelled wall and a fireplace with an overmantel framed by a lugged architrave.

No. 9 was refitted in the early 19th century, with fireplaces of that date on the ground and first floors. The second floor retains original doorcases. The front room has a reused fireplace with a pedimented overmantel, and the back room keeps an original stone fireplace with trefoil decoration. A second‑floor stair window contains painted glass thought to be by William Peckitt, with a floral panel probably by Henry Gyles.

All houses retain original attic doors and fireplaces. The roof structure is formed with principal rafters and staggered butt purlins.

== See also ==
- Grade II* listed buildings in the City of York
- Listed buildings in York (within the city walls, northern part)
