= Quetivel Mill =

Watermill in Saint Peter, Jersey

Coordinates: 49°12′31″N 2°09′41″W

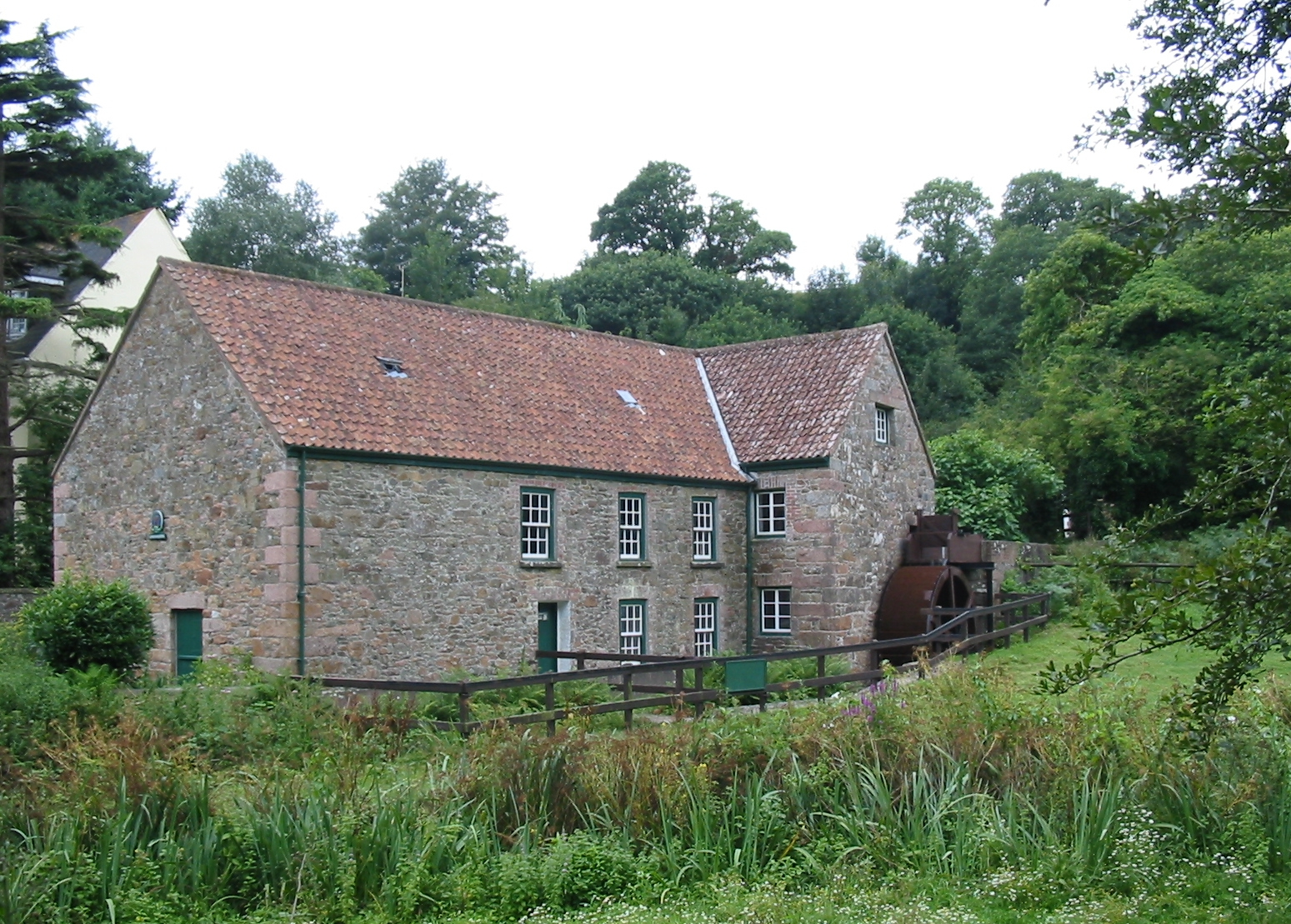
Mill and granary

Quetivel Mill is a working watermill in Saint Peter, Jersey. Its history can be traced to 1309 and the current building dates from the 18th century. It is situated near to the Jersey War Tunnels and upstream from Tesson Mill. Quetivel and Tesson are both in the care of the National Trust for Jersey.

The mill was derelict by 1934 but was brought back into use during the German occupation of the Channel Islands. It was restored again from 1971 to 1979 and the restoration received a commendation from the Civic Trust in 1978. A new water wheel was fitted in 2015.

The mill is open to the public and its operation is occasionally demonstrated, producing flour for sale, but it is not in continuous production.
