= 16 New Street =

Historic house in St Helier, Jersey

Coordinates: 49°11′07″N 2°06′24″W

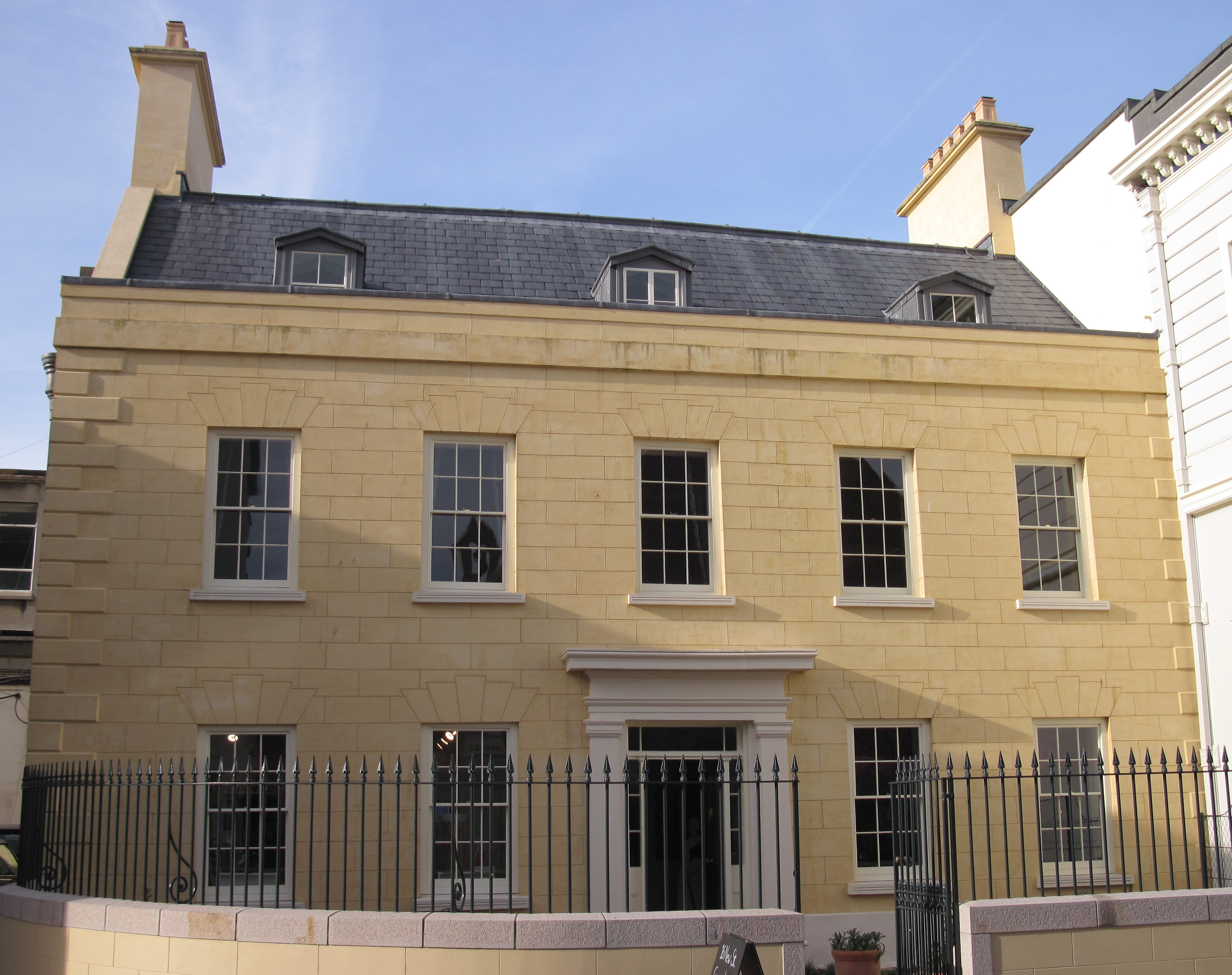
16 New Street

16 New Street is a detached Georgian house in St Helier, Jersey. It is in the care of the National Trust for Jersey. It is Grade 2 listed.

== History ==
The house was built in 1730, as part of a speculative development by the Durrell family.

From 1812 the house was a family home and office for lawyer and notary public Philippe Journeaux. He was declared bankrupt in 1850, and it was bought by local department store A. de Gruchy & Co. Subsequent use was as a letting house, and then as the Liberty Gentlemen's Club. In 1909 it was occupied by the Jersey Young Men's Christian Association; the YMCA left in 1964 and de Gruchy's used the ground and first floors for a curtain and blind manufacturing workshop and the second floor for storage. From the late 1970s it was used solely for storage. Over time it was neglected, and the gutters eventually collapsed. A number of floors had also given way.

It is 2 stories with an attic. The main façade is rendered and limewashed and scored in imitation of ashlar masonry; the roof is Welsh slate.

== Restoration ==
In 2003 the National Trust acquired the house for £1, with funds sufficient only to make it wind and watertight. The following year the Trust received a £1 million bequest from Mrs Mollie Houston, which was sufficient to finance the complete restoration. Work began in 2008, and it opened to the public in 2011.

Only one sash window survives from the original construction. As part of the restoration, a Georgian kitchen was recreated.
