= St Lawrence, Jersey =

Parish in central Jersey

Coordinates: 49.21580°N 2.14336°W

Saint Lawrence Saint Laurent (French) St Louothains (Jèrriais)
- Jersey parish
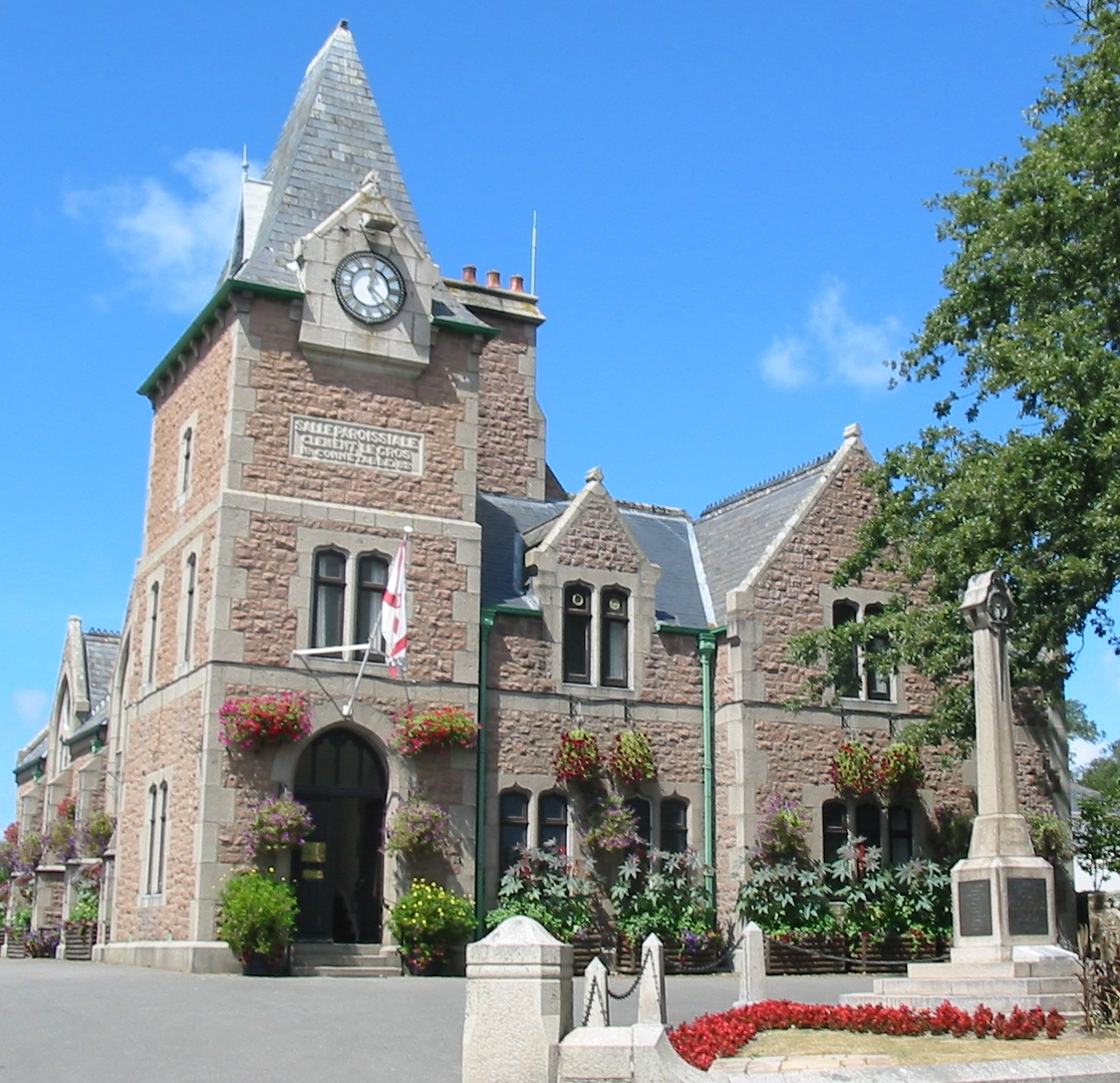
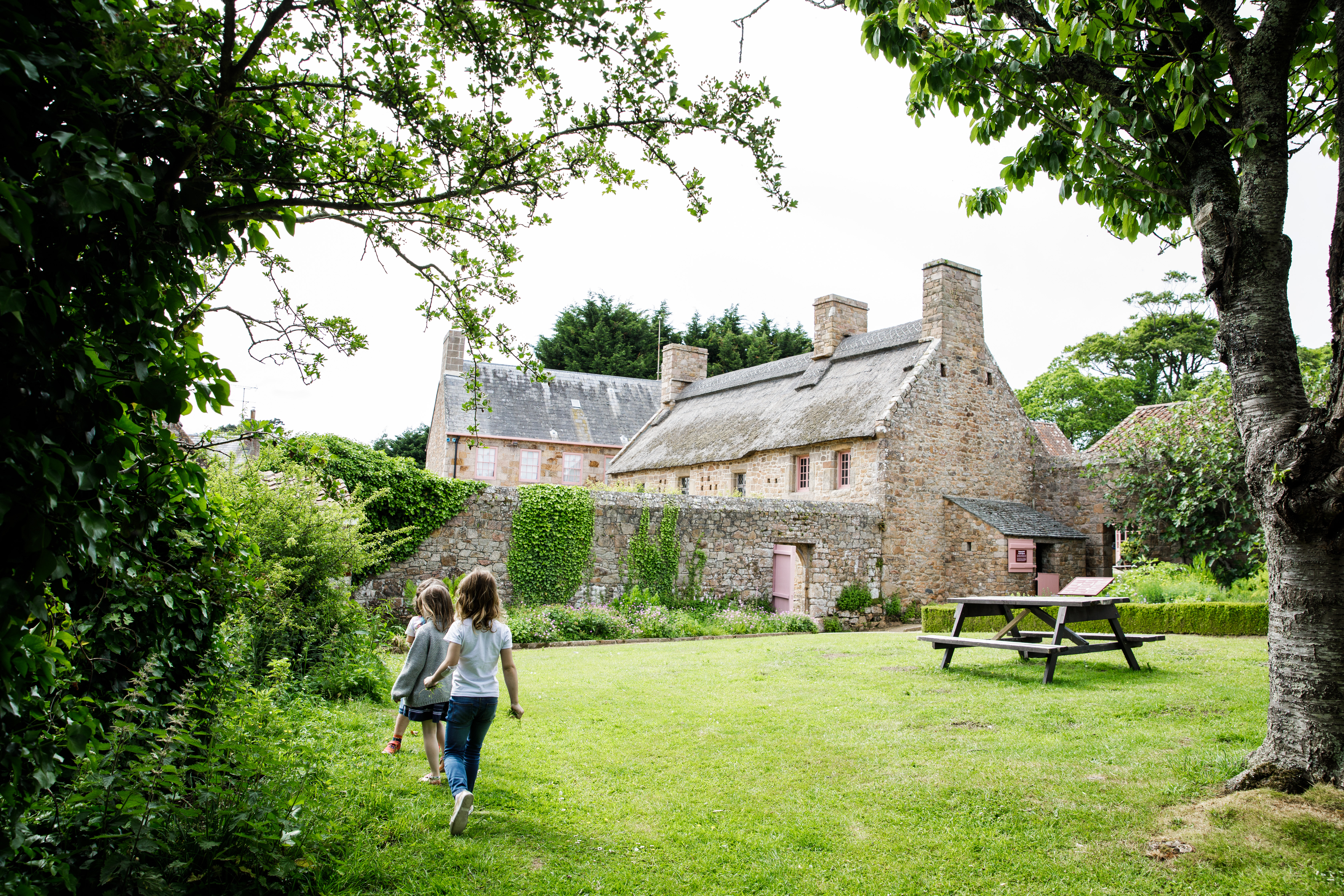
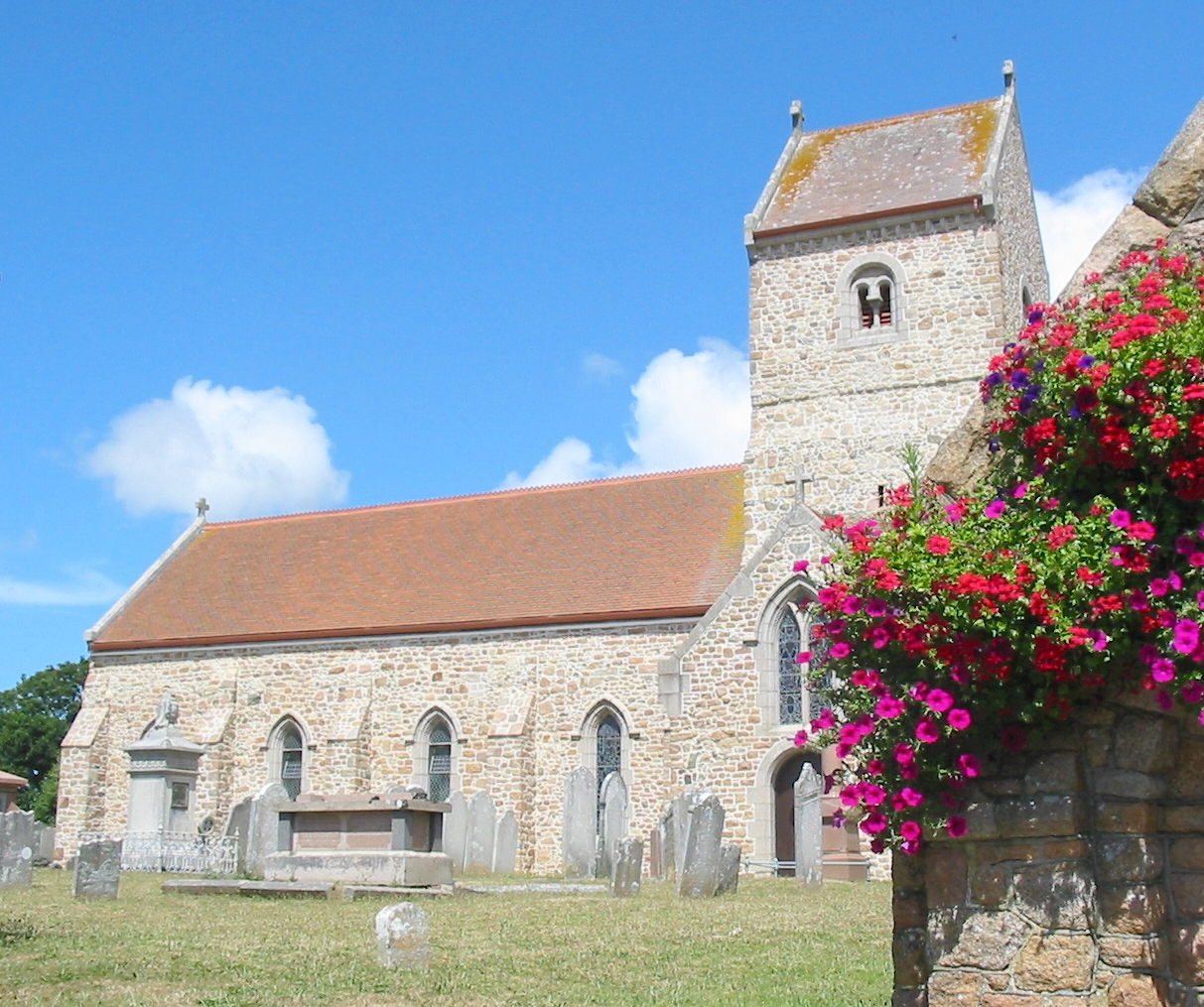
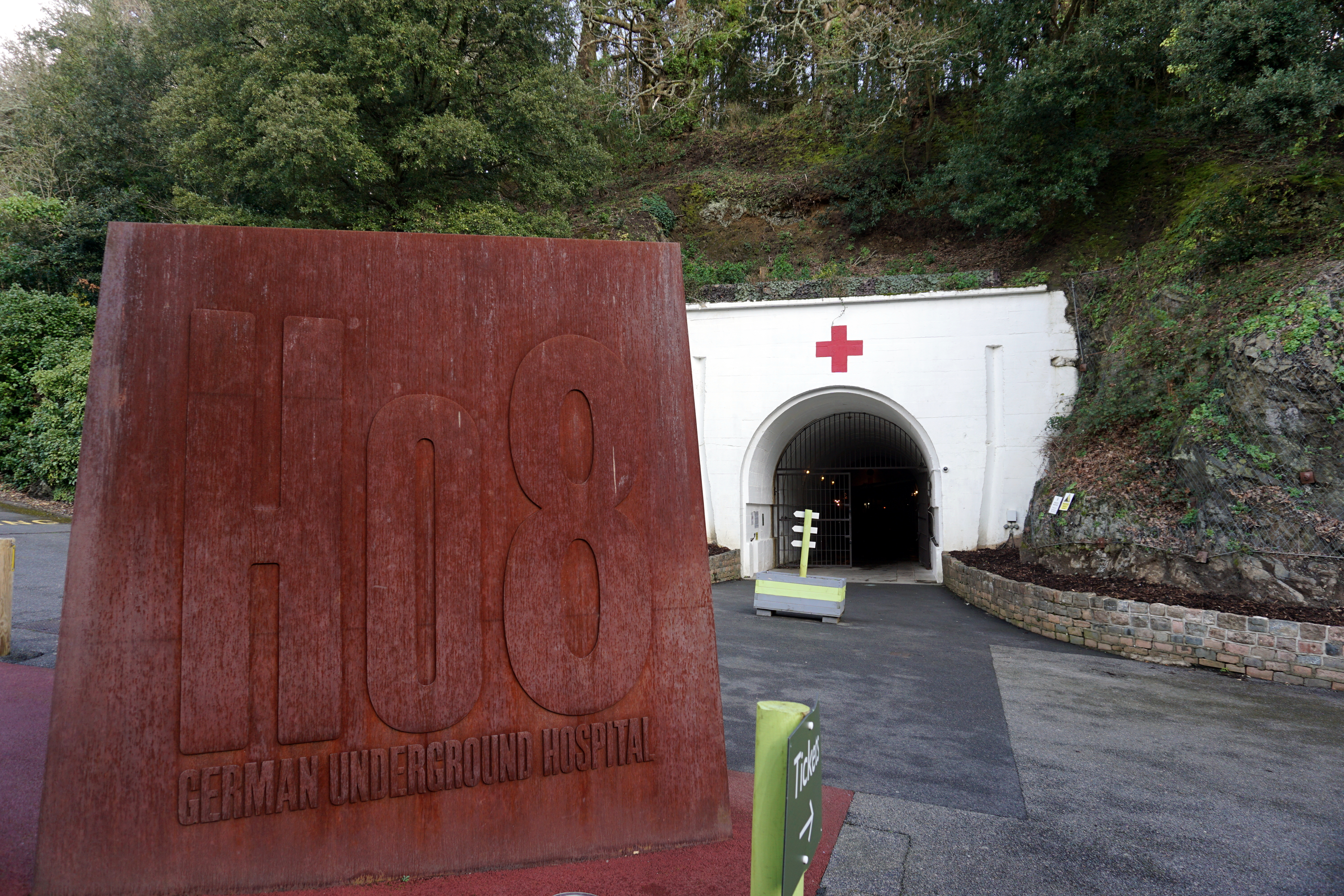
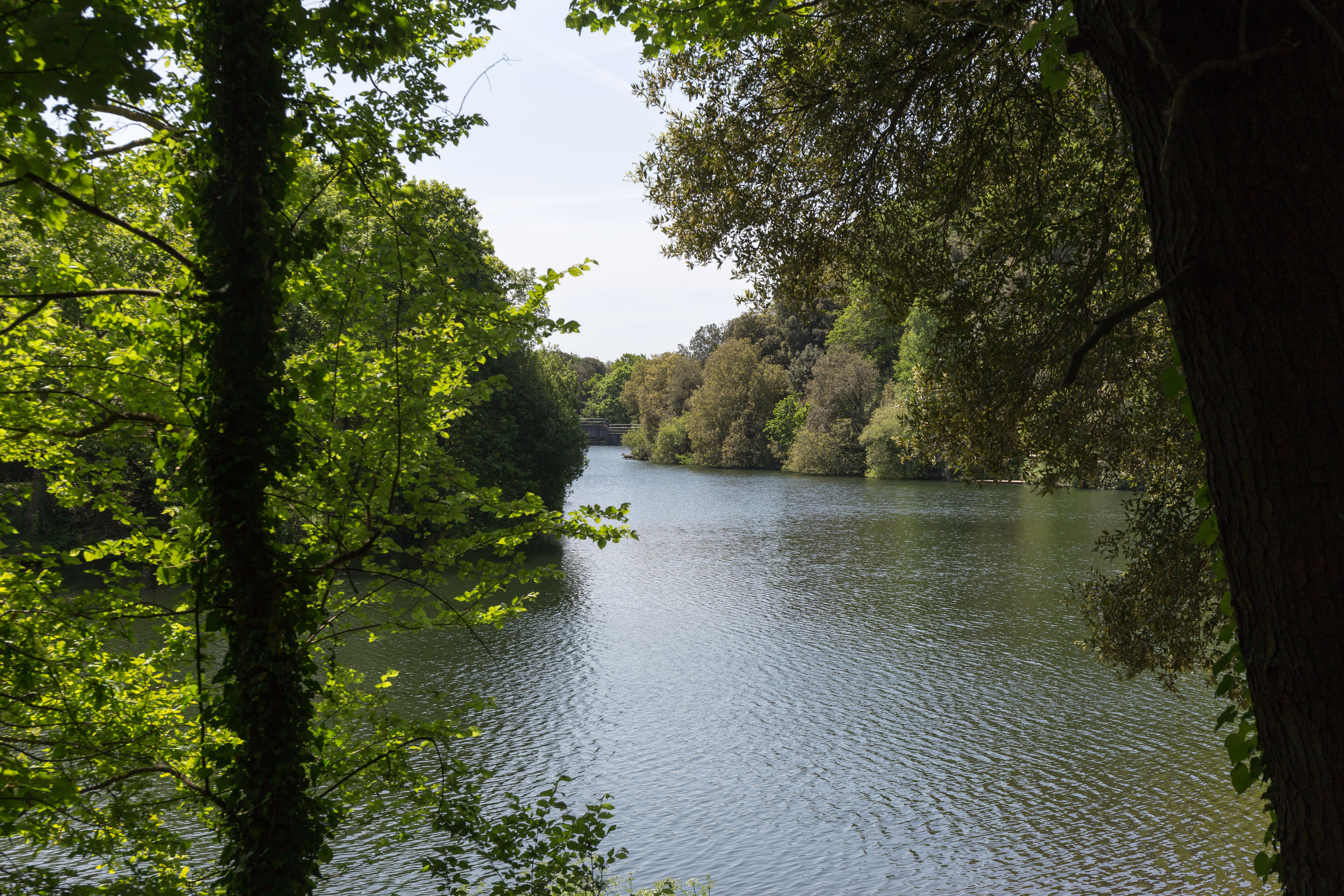
- Parish Hall Hamptonne Museum St Lawrence's Church Hohlgangsanlage 8 Dannemarche reservoir

- Flag Coat of arms

- Location of Saint Lawrence in Jersey
- Crown Dependency: Jersey, Channel Islands

Government
  - Connétable: Deidre Mezbourian

Area
  - Total: 9.5 km^{2} (3.7 sq mi)
  - Rank: Ranked 7th

Population (2011)
  - Total: 5,418
  - Density: 570/km^{2} (1,500/sq mi)
- Time zone: GMT
  - Summer (DST): UTC+01
- Postcode district: JE3
- Postcode sector: 1
- Website: www.parish.gov.je/st_lawrence/

St Lawrence (French: Saint-Laurent; Jèrriais: St Louothains) is one of the twelve parishes of Jersey in the Channel Islands. It is located 8.0 kilometres (5.0 mi) west of St Helier. (Note: Measured from the Parish Hall to the Royal Square) The parish covers 5,258 vergées (9.5 km^{2}) and occupies the centre of the Island. St Lawrence Village is also the name of a village in the parish.

Much of the parish is inland, though it has a short stretch of coastline in St Aubin's Bay. It borders St Peter and St Mary to the west, St John to the north and east, and St Helier to the east.

== History ==
As with every Jersey parish, its name derives from the name of its parish church. In this case, the church is dedicated to St Lawrence, who was martyred in Rome in 258 AD. The church was possibly situated on the site of a Celtic monastery from the Dark Age.

The Jersey parish system has been in place for centuries. By Norman times, the parish boundaries were firmly fixed and remain largely unchanged since.

In 1180 Jersey was divided by the Normans into three ministeria for administrative purposes. St Lawrence was part of de Groceio. De Groceio likely refers to the Jersey family name, de Gruchy.

== Governance ==
The parish is a first-level administrative division of the Bailiwick of Jersey, a British Crown dependency. The highest official in the parish is the Connétable of St Lawrence. The incumbent office holder is Deidre Mezbourian, who has held the office since 2008 (previously a Deputy for St Lawrence since 2005). The parish administration is headquartered at the Parish Hall next to the parish church.

At present, the parish forms one electoral district for States Assembly elections and elects two Deputies, as well as eight Senators in an islandwide constituency. The current Deputies for St Lawrence are Kristen Morel and Gregory Guida. The Chief Minister, Senator John Le Fondré, was previously a St Lawrence Deputy (2005-2018). Under the proposed electoral reform, it will form part of the Central electoral district consisting of St John, St Lawrence and Trinity, which will collectively elect four representatives alongside the parishes' Connétables.

The parish is divided into vingtaines for administrative purposes:

- La Vingtaine Haut de la Vallée
- La Vingtaine Bas de la Vallée
- La Vingtaine du Coin Hatain
- La Vingtaine du Coin Motier
- La Vingtaine du Coin Tourgis Nord
- La Vingtaine du Coin Tourgis Sud

All parishes of Jersey, including St Lawrence, have an Honorary Police force.

== Geography ==
The parish is mainly rural, but has some significant residential development. The village is in the centre of the parish, forming around the A10 main road, however it does not have a lot of residential development. Most of the development in the parish is in the south of the parish around Le Mont Felard and Bel Royal or in the north of the parish at Six Roads.

The parish has a section of Victoria Avenue, the island's main dual carriageway.

== Demography ==
The parish has 5,418 residents according to the 2011 census.

Historical population
| Year | Pop. | ±% |
|---|---|---|
| 1991 | 4,561 | — |
| 1996 | 4,773 | +4.6% |
| 2001 | 4,702 | −1.5% |
| 2011 | 5,418 | +15.2% |

== Landmarks ==
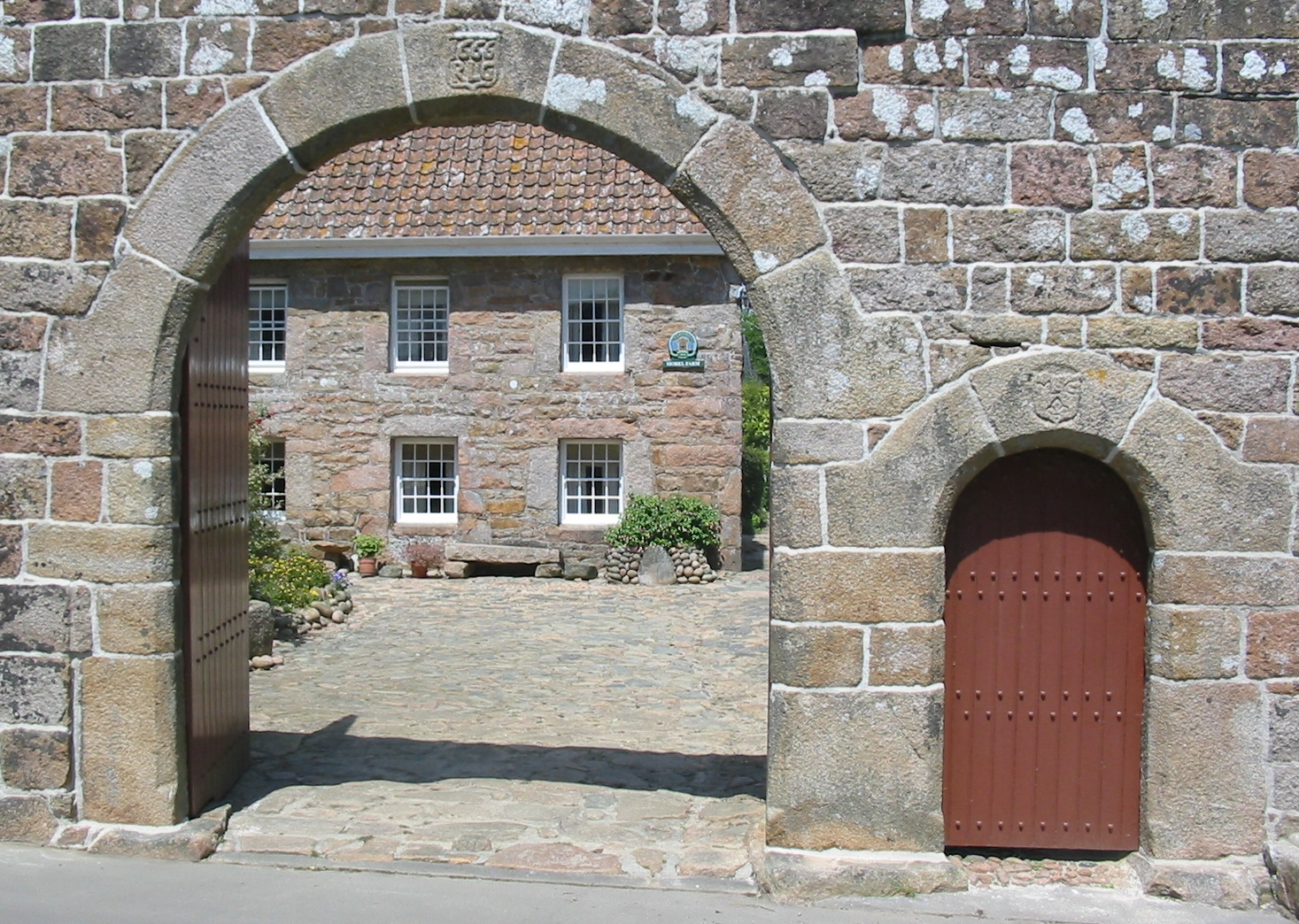
The arched entrance to Morel Farm, a National Trust for Jersey property in St. Lawrence, bears the date inscription 1666. Along with Hamptonne and Le Rât cottage, it is one of the notable examples of rural architecture in the parish

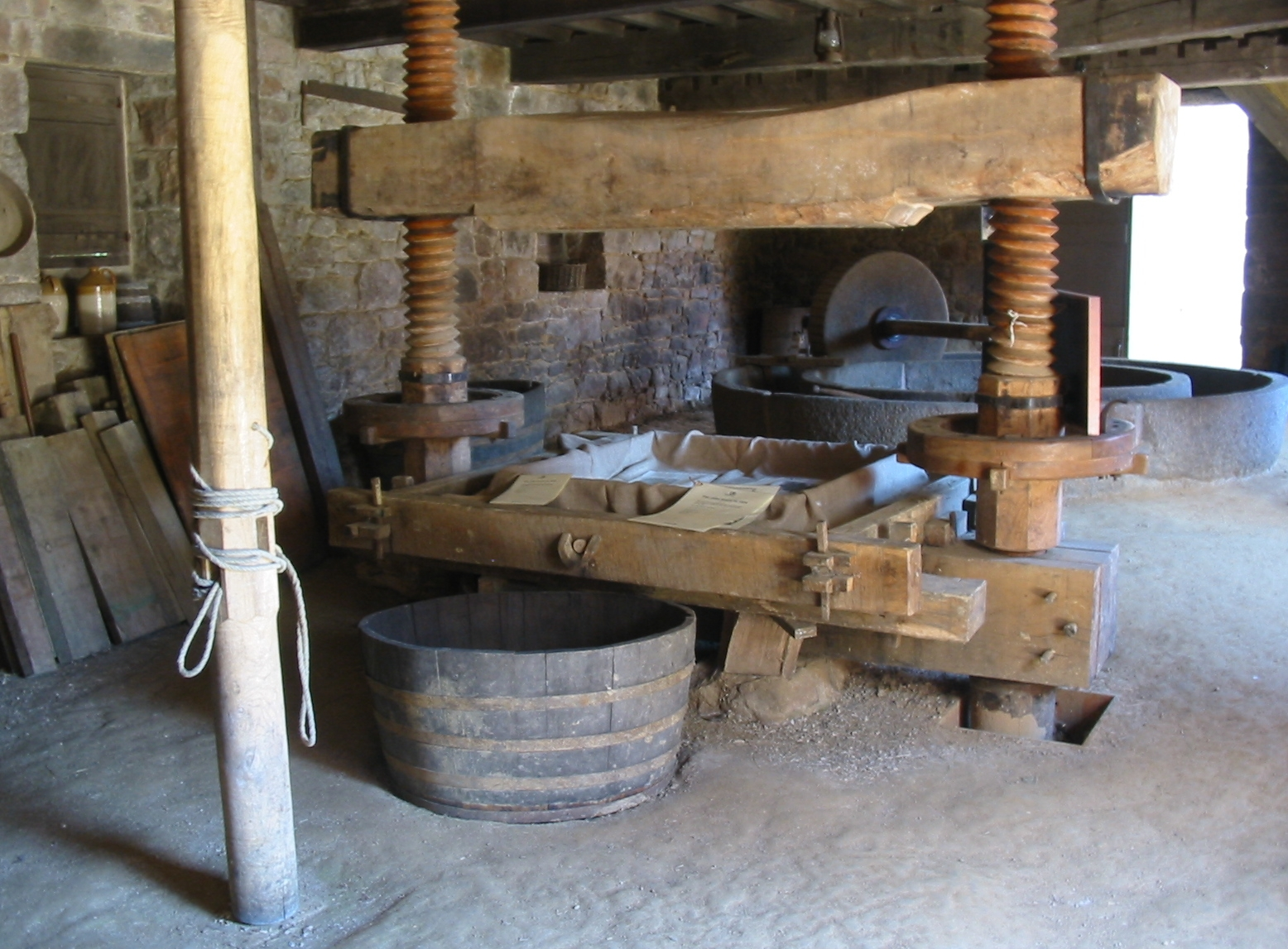
Cidermaking traditions are preserved at Hamptonne using a horse-drawn granite apple crusher and wooden two-screw press

Hamptonne, the Country Life Museum, occupies restored farm buildings in the parish. An apple orchard preserves native Jersey cider apple varieties and the preinseu (cider press house) is the focus of the annual Faîs'sie d'cidre cidermaking festival using traditional equipment and methods. The ITV drama Under the Greenwood Tree was mostly filmed here.

The Jersey War Tunnels (previously known as the German Underground Hospital) are a major relic of the engineering works undertaken by the occupying German forces 1940–1945. They also serve as a memorial to the many slave-workers pressed into labouring on such projects during the Second World War.

St Lawrence Parish Church https://stlawrencechurch.je opens most days and so worth a visit. Car park nearby

== Education ==
There are two primary schools in the parish. Bel Royal school is in the south and St Lawrence School is in the north.

== Twin towns ==
St Lawrence is twinned with:

- (France) Barneville-Carteret, Normandy
