= National Trust for Jersey =

Charitable organisation in Jersey

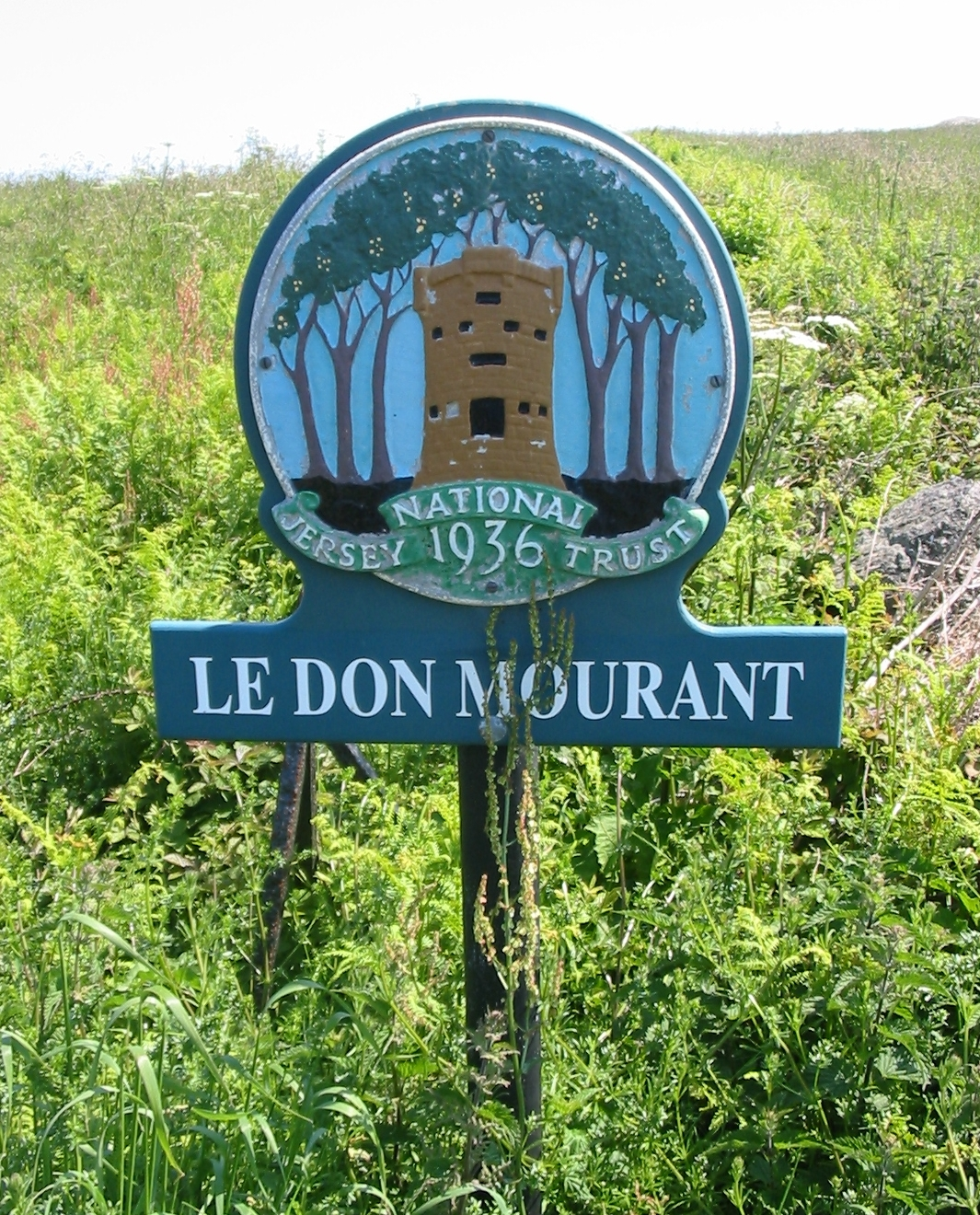
- Formation: 11 February 1937; 89 years ago
- Type: NGO
- Purpose: Preserving and safeguarding sites of historic, aesthetic and natural interest for the benefit of the island.
- Headquarters: The Elms, St. Mary
- Location: Jersey
- Official language: English
- Chief executive: Charles Alluto
- Key people: King Charles III (patron)
- Website: www.nationaltrust.je

The National Trust for Jersey is a charitable organisation which aims at preserving and safeguarding sites of historic, aesthetic and natural interest in Jersey.

The trust held its first formal meeting, headed by the Dean of Jersey, Samuel Falle, on 3 August 1936, and was incorporated in the following year by the States of Jersey. The trust is now the island's largest private land owner, caring for over 130 sites.

== Farms ==
The trust owns several farms which are of historic interest, some of these are described below.

=== The Elms ===
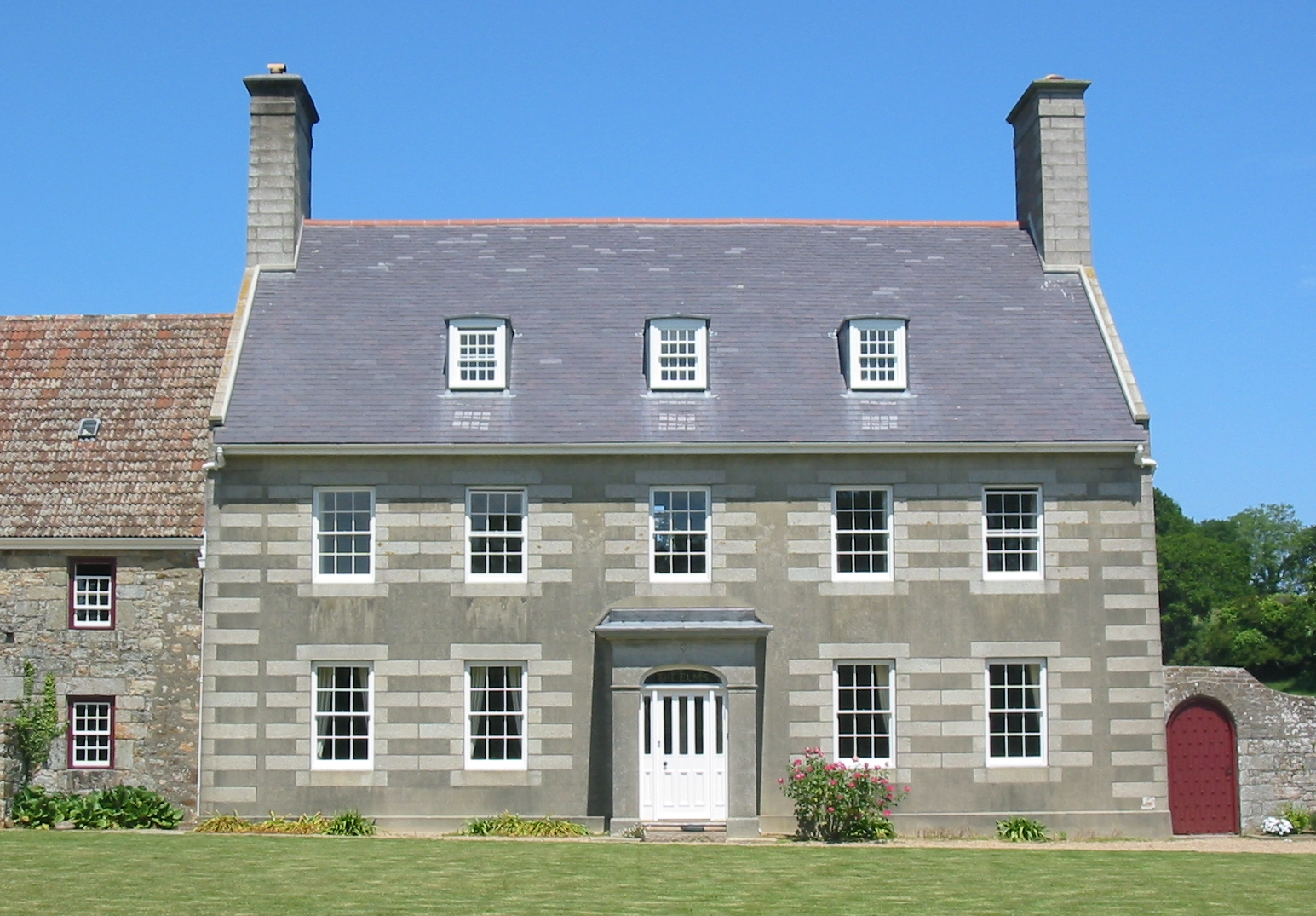
The Elms in 2005

The Elms is a former 18th-century farm, in St. Peter's Valley, which has been the trust's headquarters since 1978.

It is not operated as a museum, but some areas are normally open to visitors.

=== Hamptonne ===
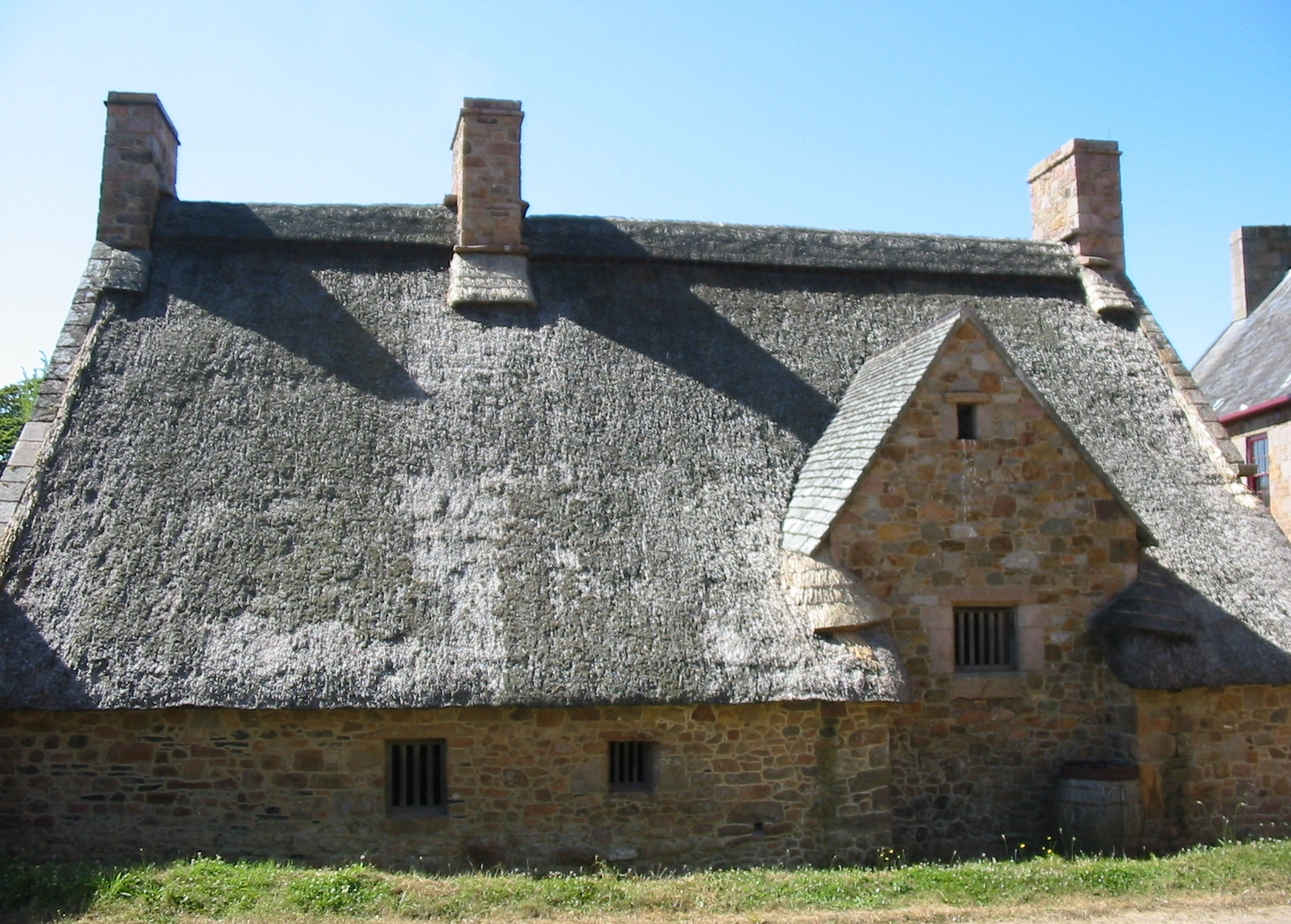
Hamptonne

Hamptonne is a country life museum in the parish of St. Lawrence, and was purchased by the trust in 1987. The museum is operated by Jersey Heritage.

The earliest records indicate that a building was located here in 1445.

In 2005, much of the Ecosse Films drama Under the Greenwood Tree was filmed here.

The museum is open to the public, from June to September. In October, it becomes the venue for La Faîs'sie d’Cidre (a cider making festival).

=== Morel Farm ===
This working farm is located in St. Lawrence. Some structures here were built in 1666.

== Mills ==
Le Moulin de Quétivel, a restored watermill which is open to the public and grinds flour for sale in its shop.

== Military buildings ==
The trust owns a number of former military buildings in Jersey. Some of these are listed here.

=== Câtel Fort ===
Câtel Fort is an 18th-century guardhouse, situated overlooking Grève de Lecq Bay.

=== Grève de Lecq Barracks ===
In 1810, construction of Grève de Lecq Barracks was started, and a garrison was stationed here until the 1920s. It was able to house up to 250 troops.

The barrack buildings, located in St Mary, have been restored and are open to the public from May to September.

=== La Caumine à Marie Best ===
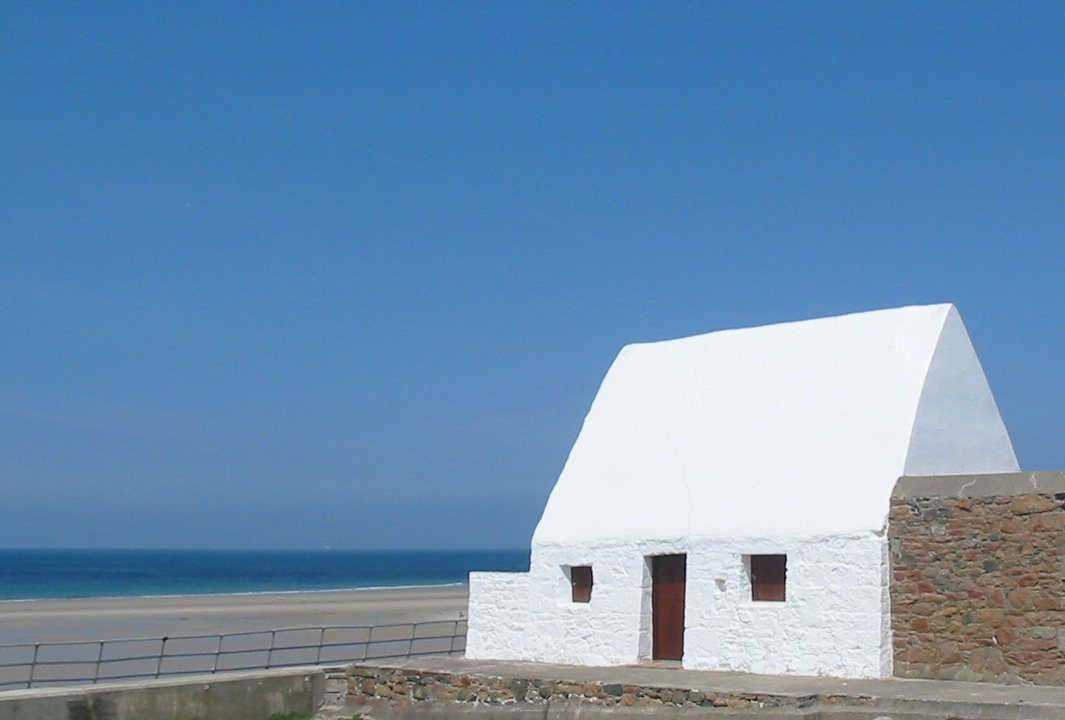
Le Don Hilton or La Cauminne à Mary Best in St. Peter

Le Don Hilton or La Caumine à Marie Best is a former guard house and gunpowder magazine in St. Ouen's Bay, St. Peter.

=== Victoria Tower ===
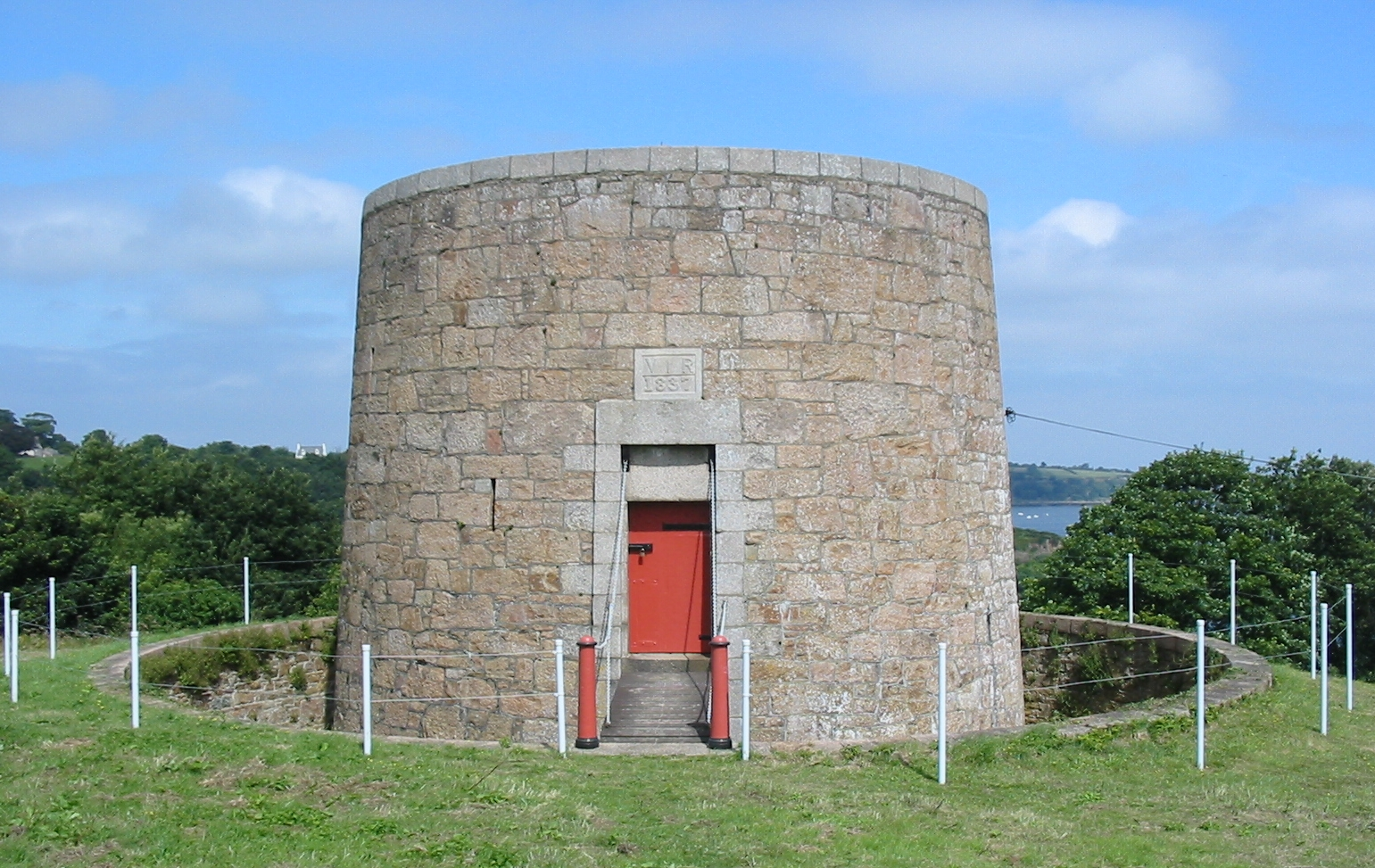
Victoria Tower

Victoria Tower is a Martello tower built in 1837, and located on Le Mont Nicholas opposite Mont Orgueil. It overlooks Anne Port on the north side and Gorey on the south.

== Historic Houses ==
=== 16 New Street ===
16 New Street is a Georgian house in the centre of St Helier.

== Cottages ==
=== La Ronce ===
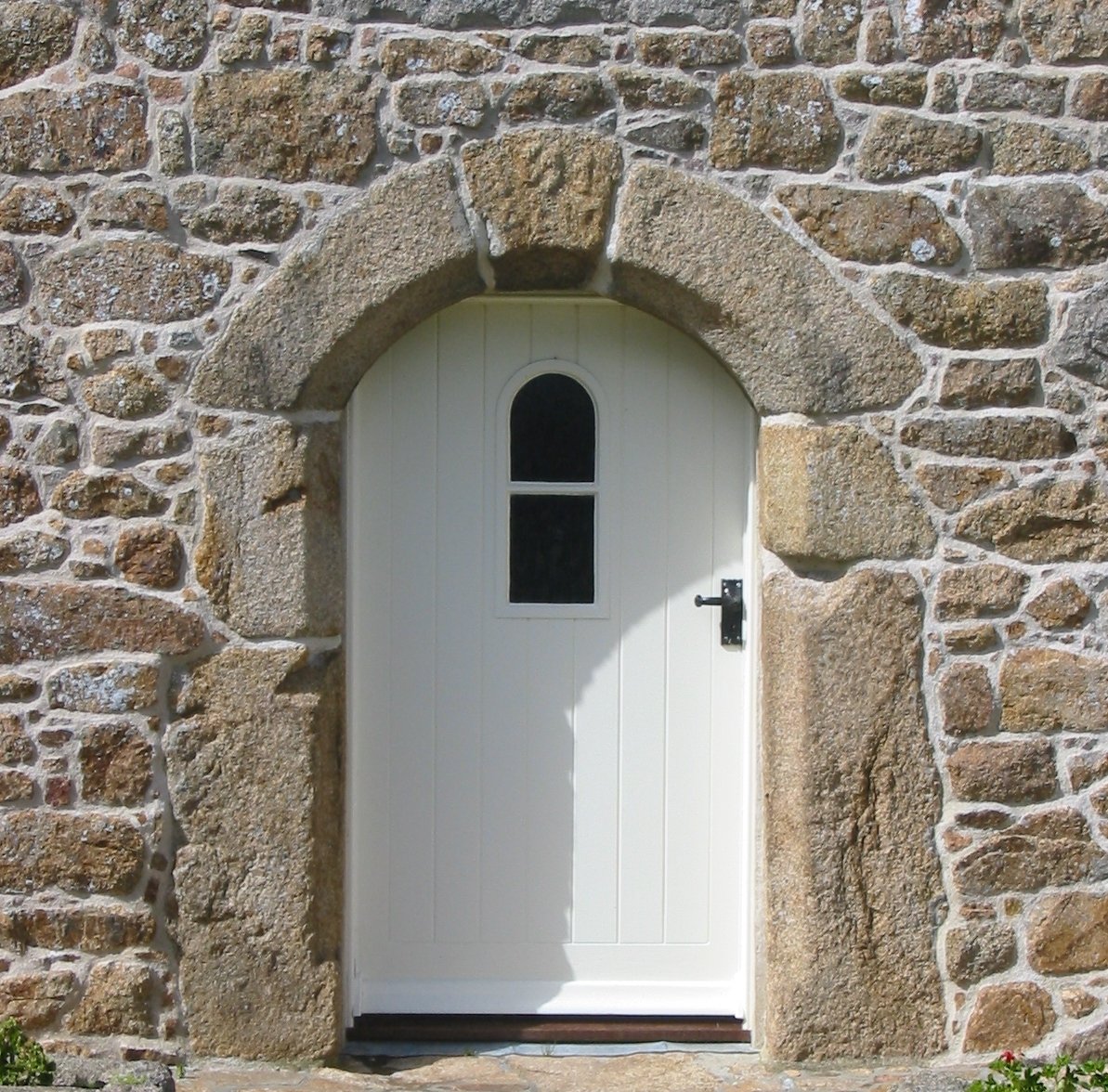
Doorway at La Ronce

La Ronce is a two-story 17th-century granite cottage which is listed as a Site of Special Interest (pSSI). The stone above the doorway has been incised with what appears to be the year 1621.

The building has had further additions made, probably during the 18th century.

In 2012, a 99-year lease on the property was made available to purchase from the trust.

== Natural environment ==
=== Jersey Wetland Centre ===
In 2012, plans were submitted to improve facilities at the wetland area known as St. Ouen's Pond, in St. Ouen. The plans include a substantial upgrade of the existing bird hide. The costs are estimated to be £102,000, and funded by the Tourism Development Fund (States of Jersey) and the RBC Blue Water Project (Royal Bank of Canada).

=== Le Noir Pré ===
Le Noir Pré comprises two adjacent wet meadows, also known as the orchid fields because the Orchis laxiflora can be found growing here. The Channel Islands are the only place in the British Isles where this orchid can be seen, normally during May and June.

=== Les Monts Grantez ===
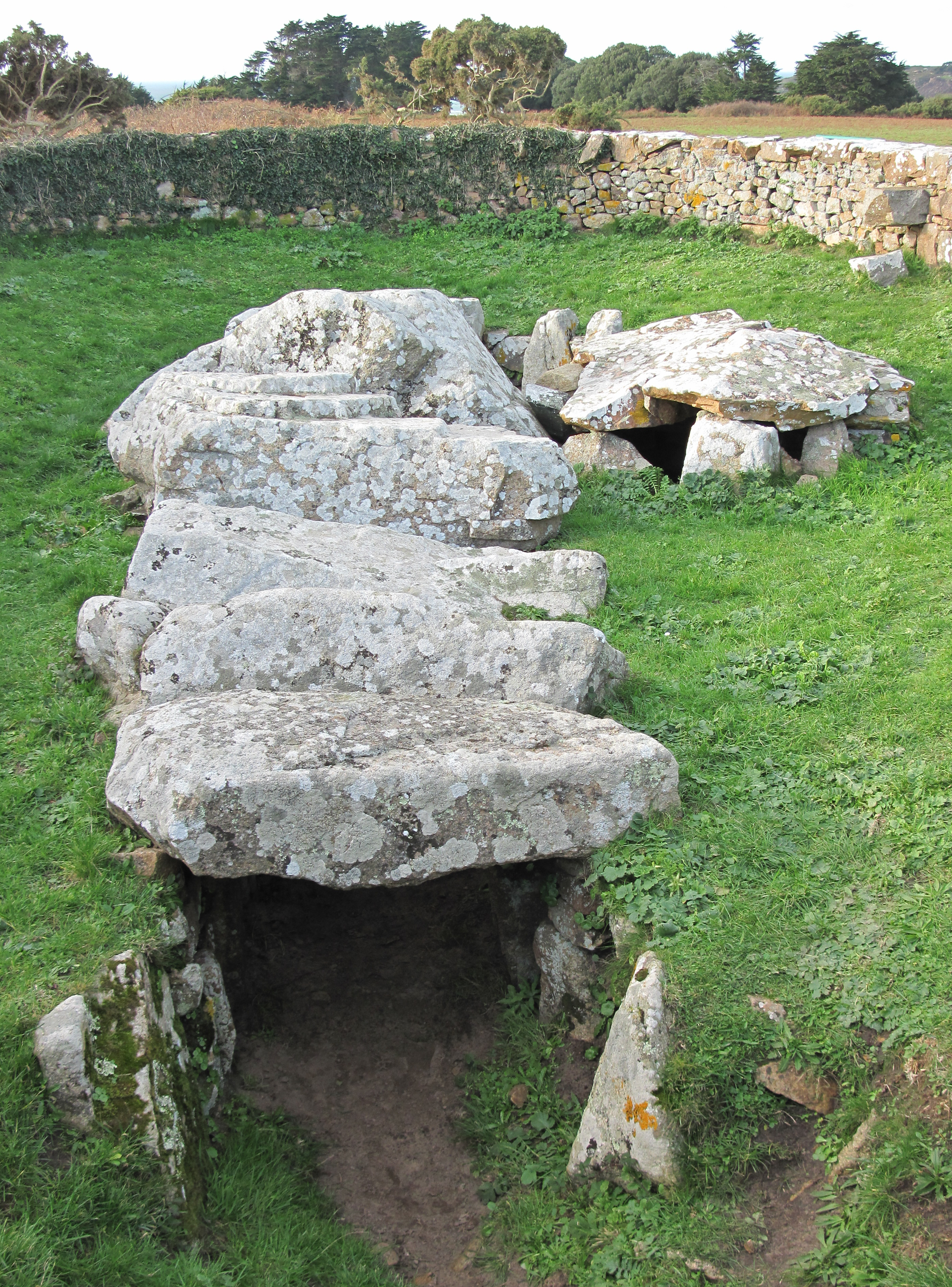
Dolmen des Monts Grantez

This is an elevated area which overlooks St Ouen's bay, it features the Neolithic dolmen des Monts Grantez, pedestrian footpaths, grazing areas for cattle, and car parking.

The site is used as a venue for the trust's annual Sunset Concert.

=== La Vallée des Vaux ===
La Vallée des Vaux is a woodland valley which lies in the north of St Helier, parts of which are owned by the trust.

=== Fern Valley ===
Fern Valley is a Y-shaped valley in the parish of St Lawrence. Wildlife found here includes red squirrels and Jersey tiger moths (Euplagia quadripunctaria).

== Gallery ==
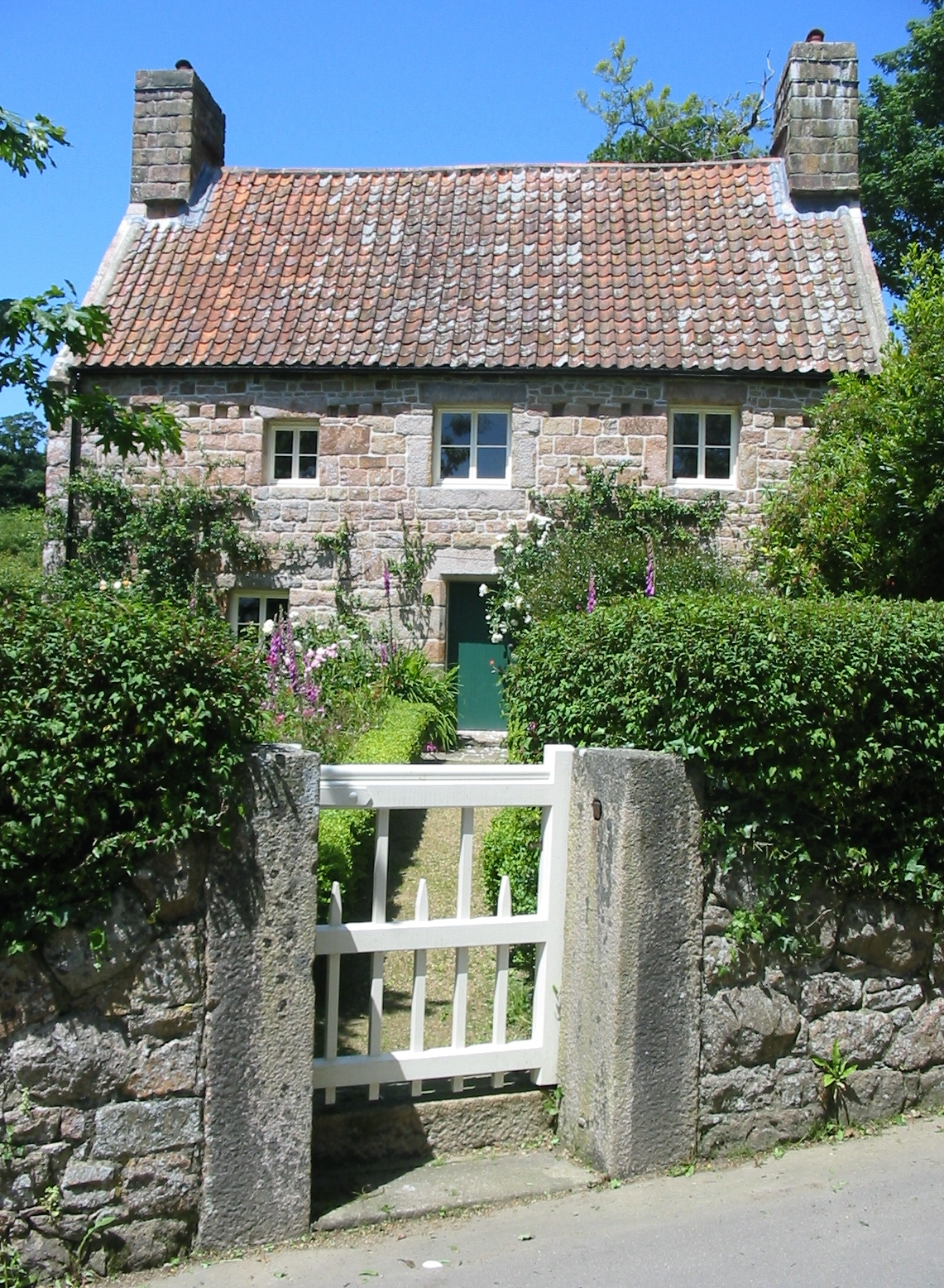
Le Rât

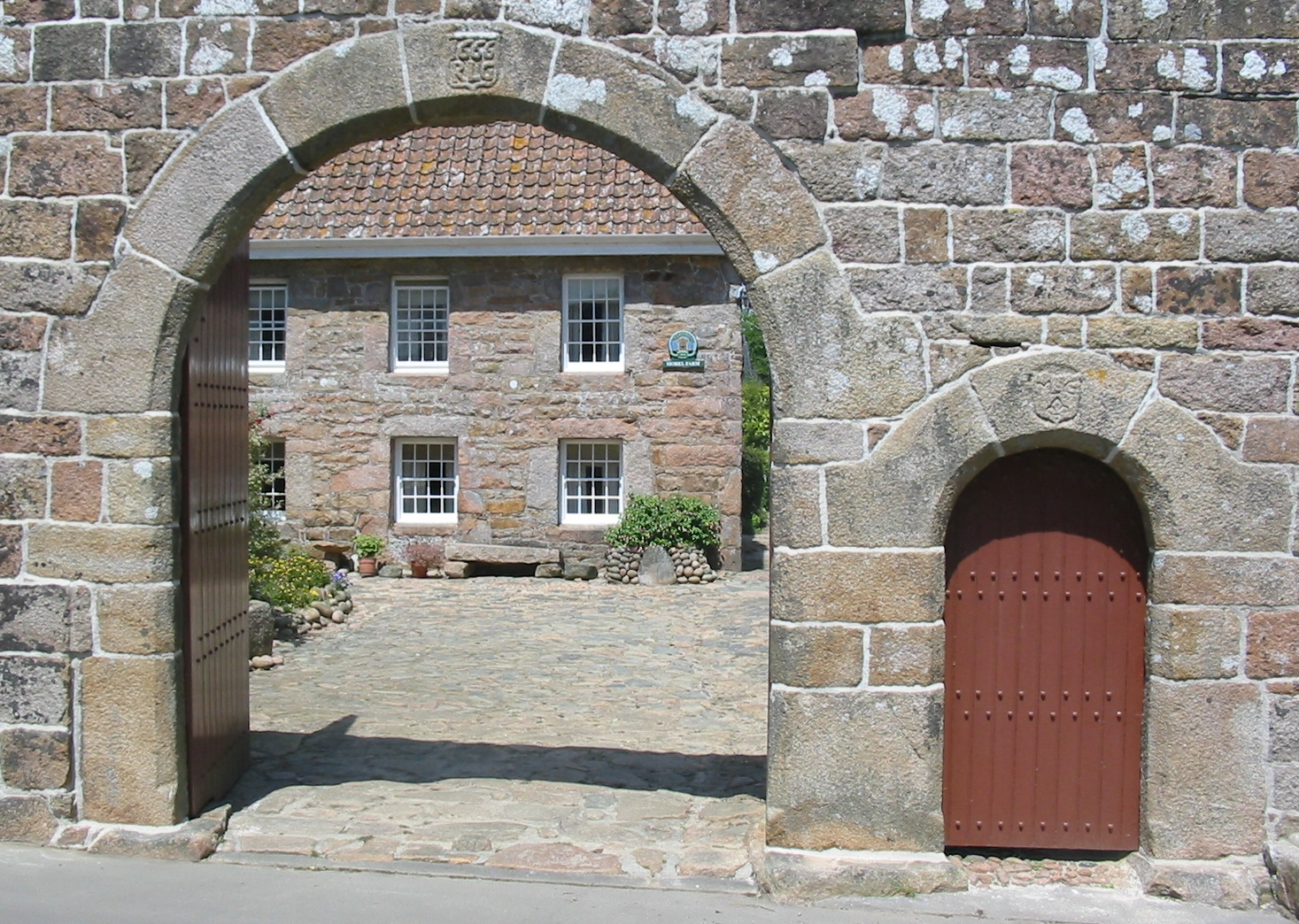
Morel Farm

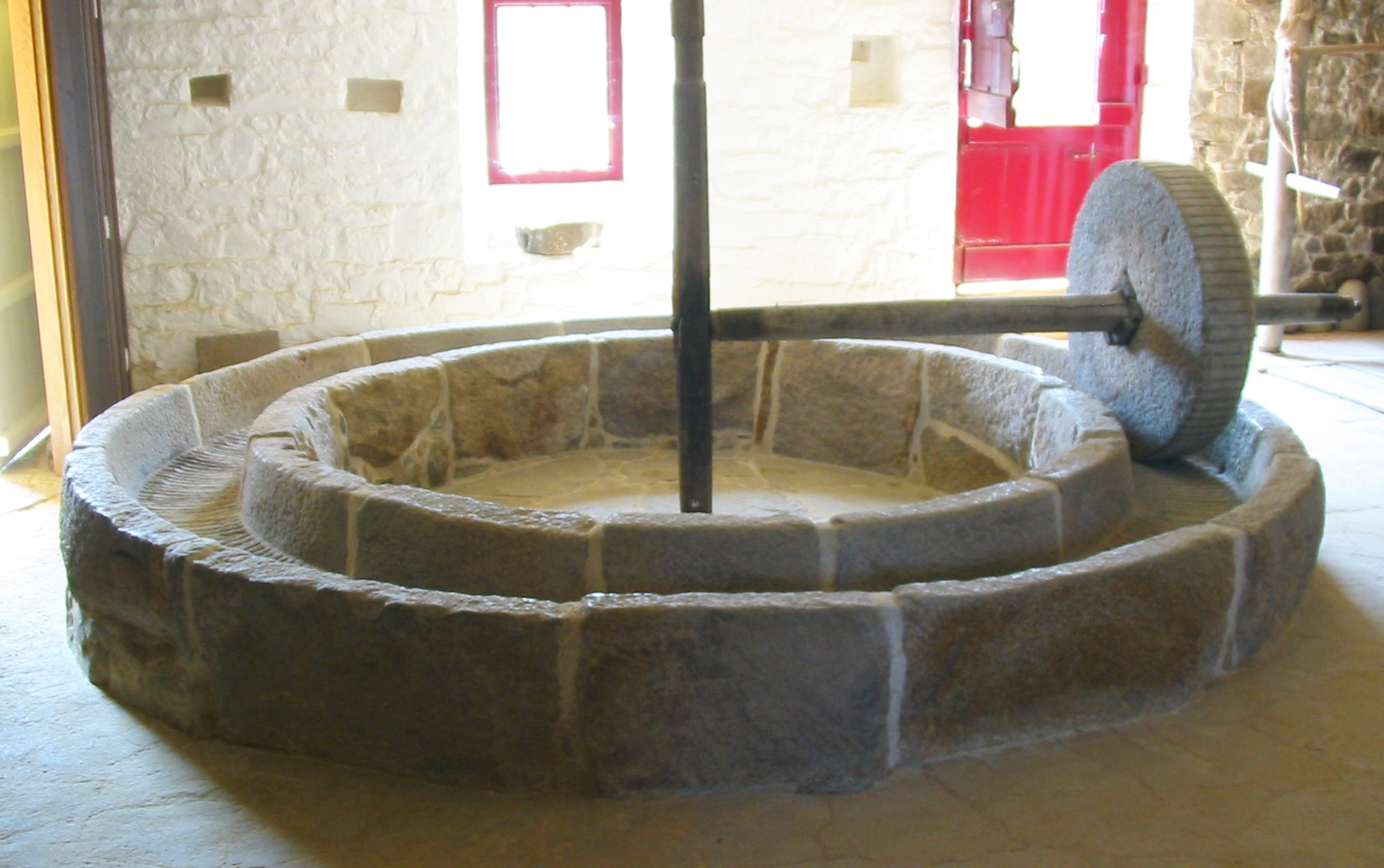
Apple crusher at Morel Farm

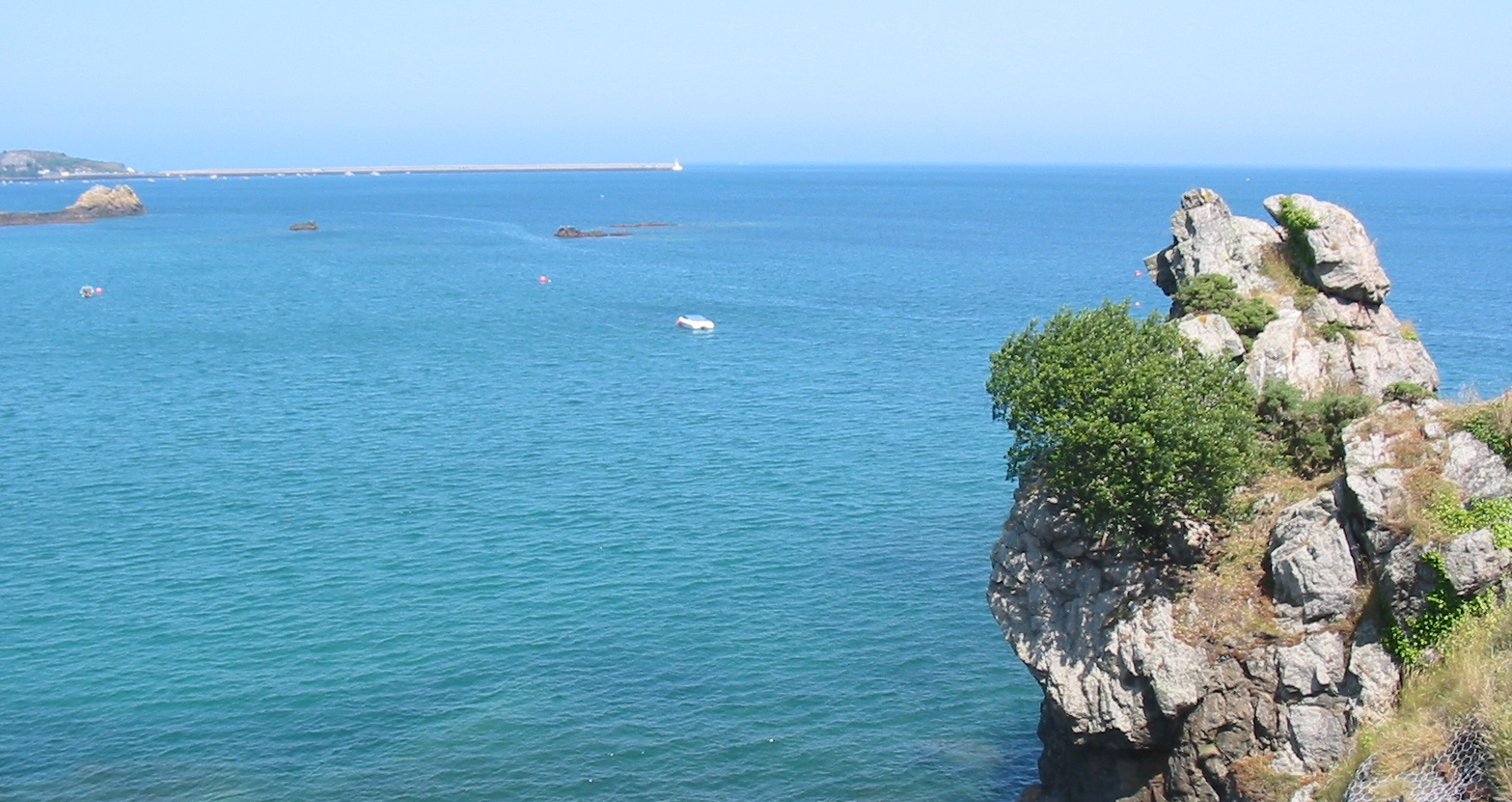
Le Saut Geffroy (Geffroy's Leap)

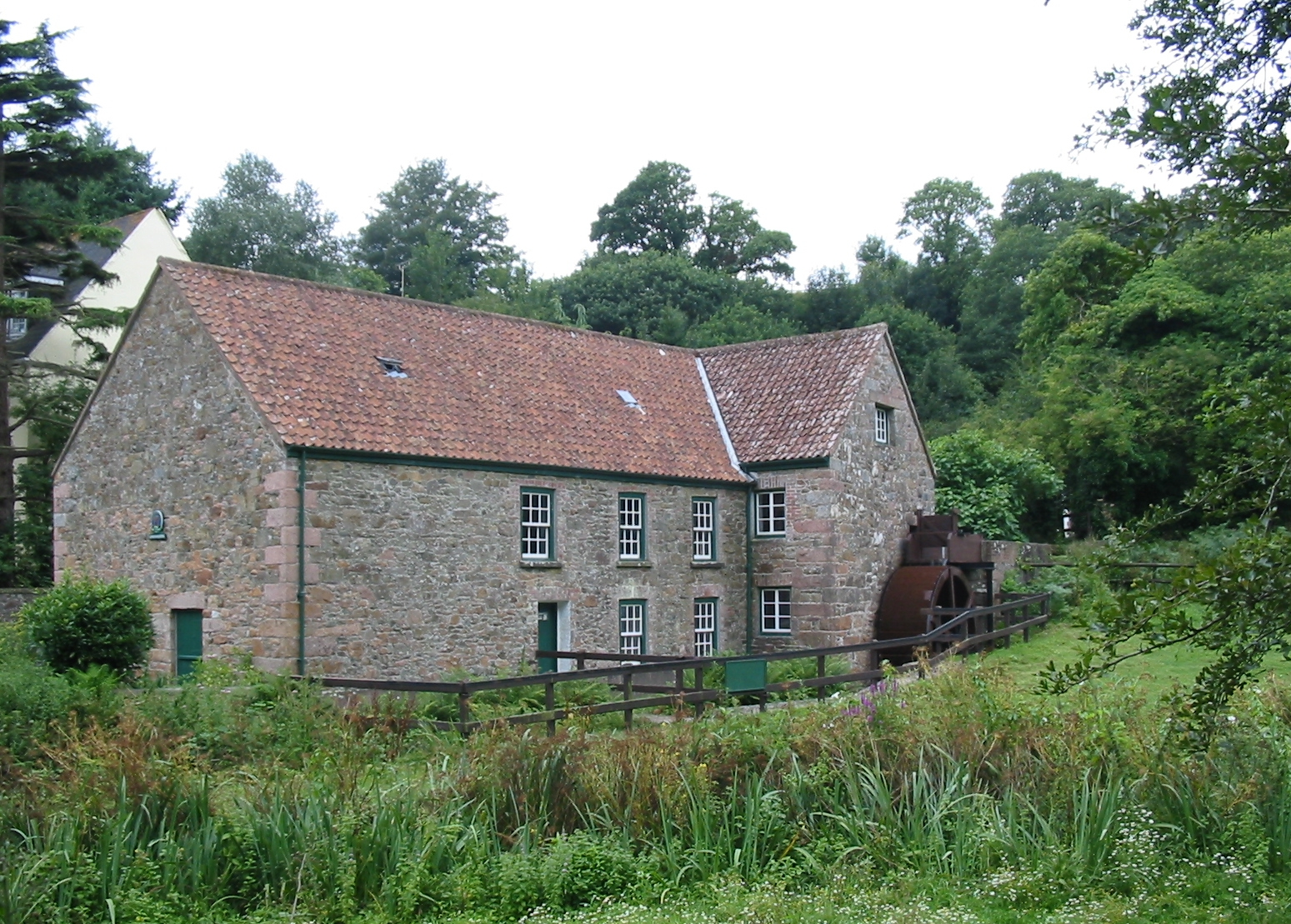
Le Moulin de Quétivel

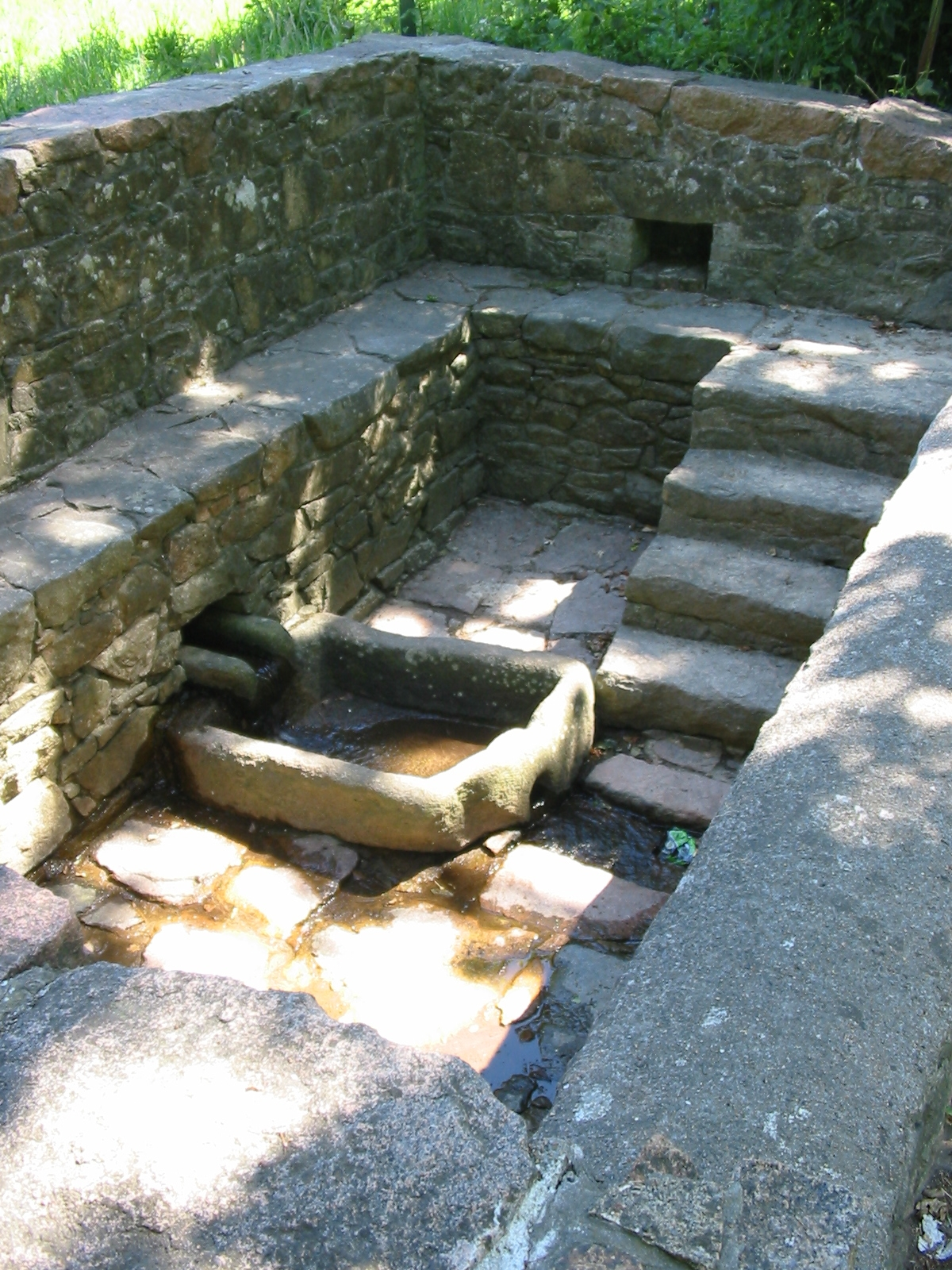
Le Lavoir de la Rue des Prés

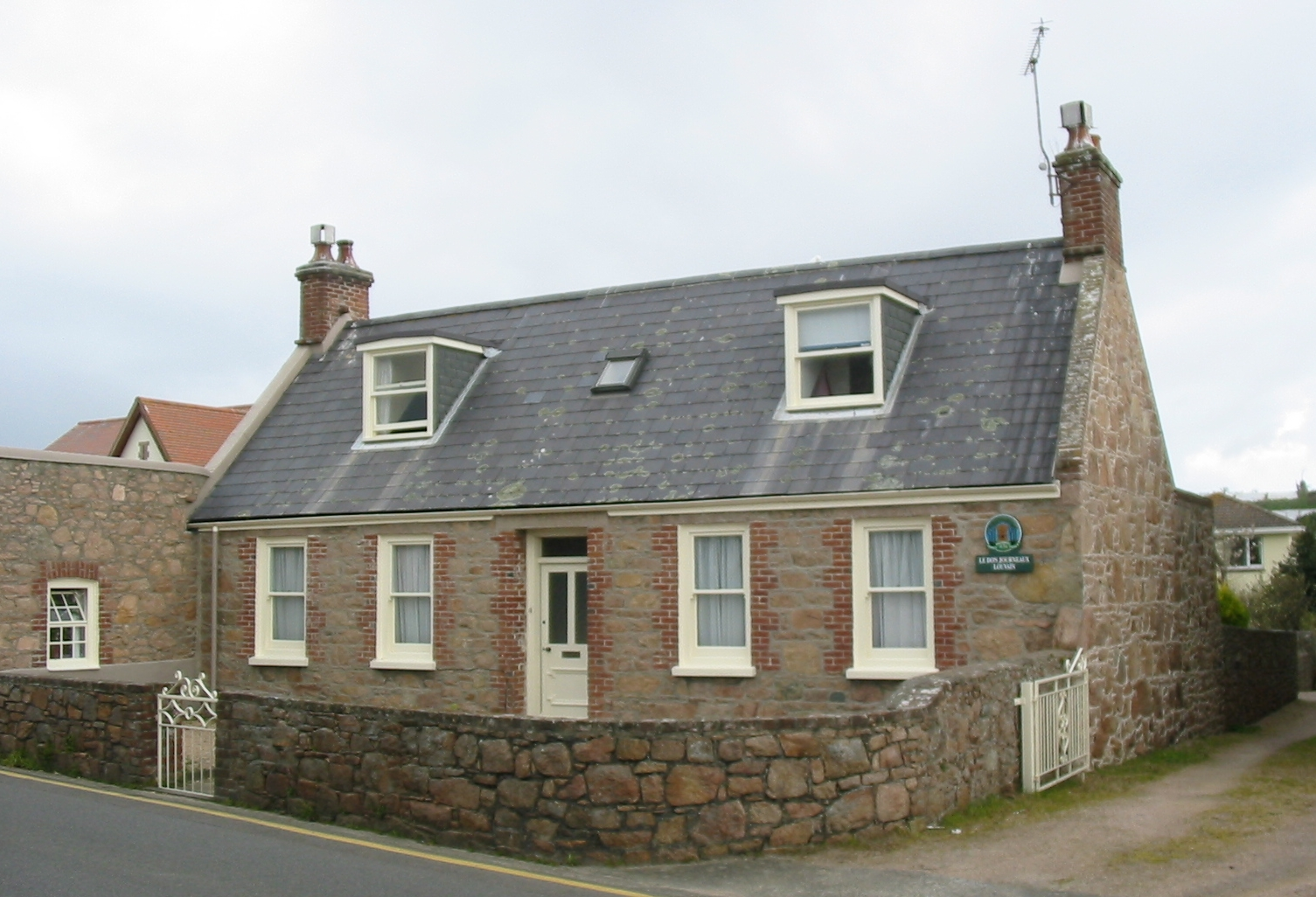
Le Don Journeaux, a house in St. Clement.
