= New Street (York) =

Street in York, England

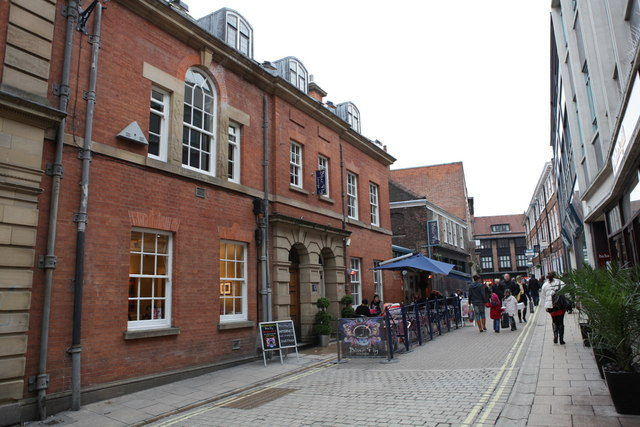
- Looking north-east on New Street
- Location within York
- Former name: Cumberland Row
- Location: York, England
- Postal code: YO1
- Coordinates: 53.9594°N 1.0842°W
- North east end: Davygate
- South west end: Coney Street

Construction
- Commissioned: 1745
- Completion: 1747

New Street is a historic street in the city centre of York, England.

== History ==
The street was planned in 1745. Two houses were demolished, a derelict one facing Coney Street, and Davy Hall, on Davygate. It was paved in 1747 and was originally named Cumberland Row. By the early 19th century, the street was generally known as "New Street". In 1891, the street was widened, and some buildings at the north-east end of the street were demolished.

In 1805, the Methodist New Street Chapel was opened on the street. It closed in 1908, becoming the Central Mission, and then from 1910 a variety theatre. In 1922, it became the Tower Cinema. It closed in 1966 and was replaced by the Davygate Arcade, which has since also been demolished.

The street is now home to a mixture of shops and bars, with the City of York Council noting that it is a secondary shopping street, with the sides of some buildings facing the street. The York Mix has noted ongoing issues with alcohol-related disorder on the street, which it describes as "teeming with bars".

== Layout and architecture ==
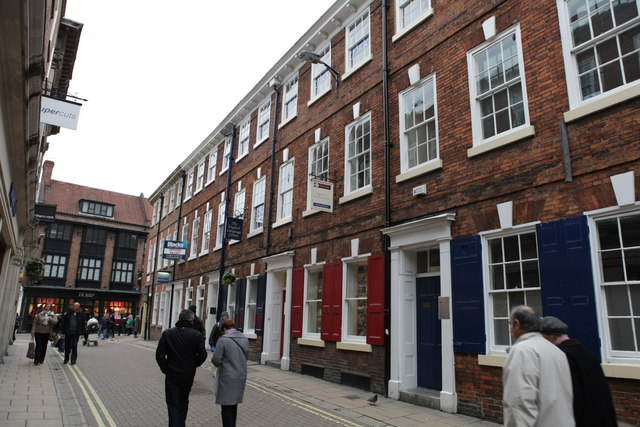
3–9 New Street

The street runs south-west from Davygate to Coney Street. Much of the south-east side is occupied by the Grade II*-listed Nos. 3–9; one of the first terraces of identical houses built in the city, it was completed in 1746 and originally consisted of six houses, of which four survive. No. 1 and what is now 16 Davygate were rebuilt in 1958–59 in a style matching the terrace. On the north-west side is No. 8, built as a coach house in about 1745, which later served as the engine house of the Yorkshire Insurance Company.
