= Hohlgangsanlage 8 =

Partially completed underground hospital complex in St. Lawrence, Jersey

- German Underground Hospital
- Part of Atlantic Wall
- Jersey
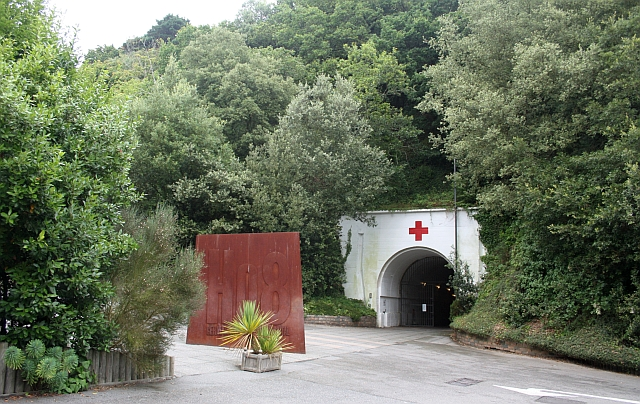
- Entrance to Ho8

Site information
- Open to the public: Yes
- Condition: Restored, museum and memorial to slave labourers

Location
- Coordinates: 49.2103°N 2.1542°W

Site history
- Built: 1941–1945
- Built by: Organisation Todt (Nazi Germany)
- In use: 1941–45
- Materials: Concrete, steel, and timber
- Events: Occupation of the Channel Islands

Hohlgangsanlage 8 (often abbreviated to Ho8, also known as the German Underground Hospital or the Jersey War Tunnels) was a partially completed underground hospital complex in St. Lawrence, Jersey, built by German occupying forces during the occupation of Jersey during World War II. Over 1 km (1,100 yd) of tunnels were completed. After the liberation of the Channel Islands, the complex was converted into a museum detailing the occupation, and remains a visitor attraction.

== History ==
After Hitler's October 1941 order to fortify the Channel Islands (as part of the Atlantic Wall), work began on a string of fortifications all around Jersey. Ho8 was intended to be a vast network of tunnels that would allow the German occupying infantry to withstand Allied air raids and bombardment (in preparation for an invasion). Forced labourers from the Organisation Todt (as well as paid labourers and skilled workers) were shipped in to Jersey and put to work building the complex. Many of the workers were Polish, French, Russian or Republican Spaniards. Conditions were terrible, although Russian and Ukrainian POWs were treated the worst, with cases of malnutrition, death by exhaustion and disease among them becoming common. On the other hand, the voluntary workers often had much better conditions, being offered over four times the wages that they would have earned working in similar jobs for the States of Jersey, and often receiving extra food rations.

In late 1943, with the threat of an Allied invasion of Europe (Operation Overlord) becoming clear, Ho8 was to be converted into a casualty clearing station and emergency hospital. The hospital had 500 beds for patients, with a full heating and air conditioning system (although the rest of the tunnel complex usually maintained a constant temperature of about 17 °C (63 °F), due to its being built deep into the hillside). A system of gas-proof doors was installed to maintain a clean airflow in the tunnels, and a fully equipped operating theatre was installed. Unfinished tunnels were sealed off.

Despite the huge preparations and fortifications made to the Channel Islands, none were ever utilised. The occupying forces in the Channel Islands surrendered on 9 May 1945 (one day after the rest of the German forces surrendered). Ho8 fell into disuse, with British soldiers and souvenir hunters stripping the tunnels of equipment.

== Post-liberation and present day ==
In July 1946, the States of Jersey opened the tunnels to the public. In 1961, the Royal Court ruled that the subterranean complex belonged to the private owners of the land above it, and Ho8 fell under private ownership. The complex was restored, with a collection of Occupation memorabilia and a museum and memorial to the occupation being set up. In 2001, a permanent exhibit called "Captive Island" was unveiled in the tunnel complex, detailing everyday life for civilians in Jersey before, during and after the occupation of Jersey. Today, Ho8 is generally referred to as the "Jersey War Tunnels" or just "The war tunnels". The Jersey War Tunnels has also housed military vehicles such as a Char B1 bis tank, which served in Jersey with the Panzer-Abteilung 213 during the occupation which was on loan from The Tank Museum. As of March 2012 there is also a replica Stug III assault gun owned by the war tunnels.

== See also ==
- Hohlgangsanlage tunnels, Jersey
- Occupation of the Channel Islands
- Atlantic Wall
