= Vergée =

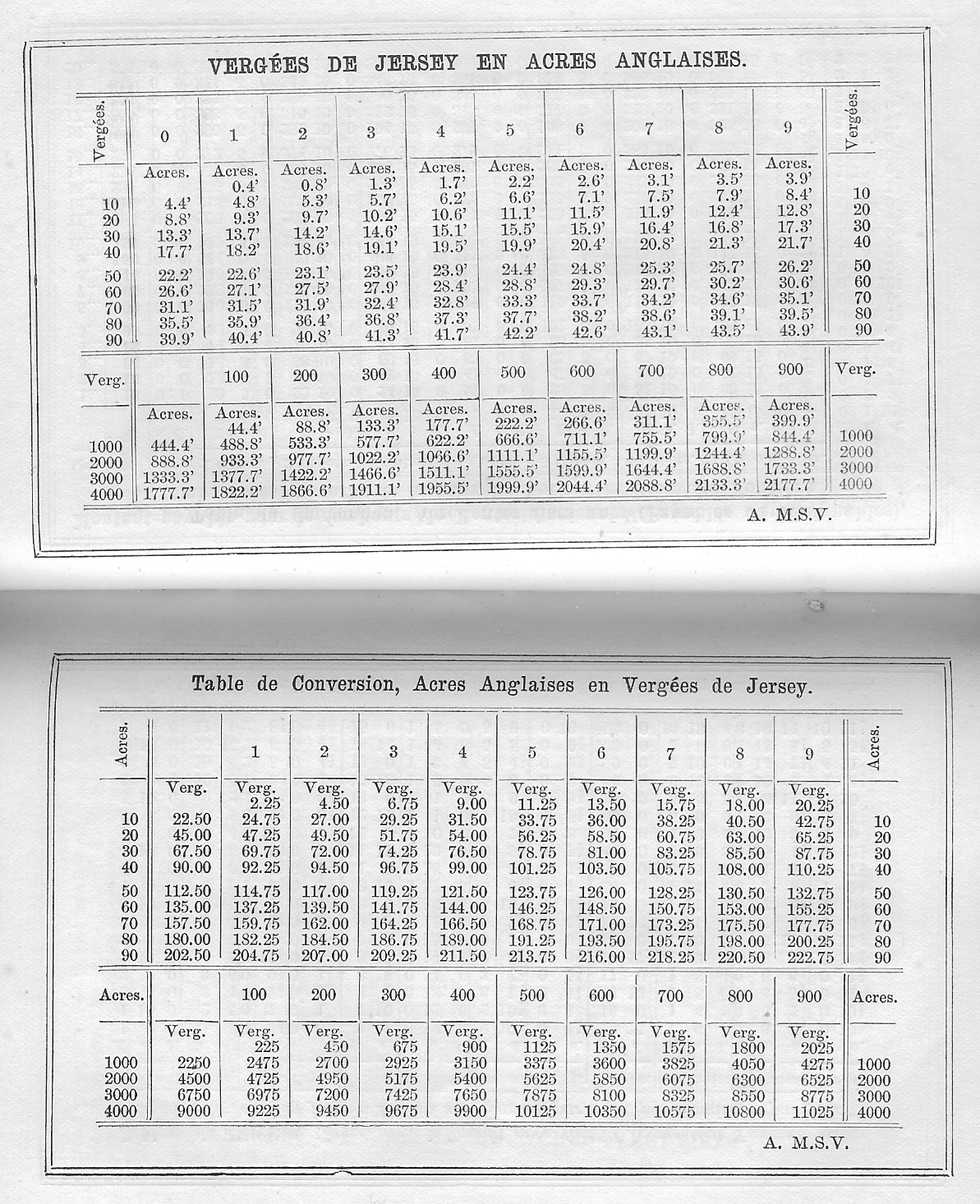
Tables of conversion between Jersey vergées and English acres from an 1891 almanac

A vergée (French pronunciation: [vɛʁʒe], alternative spellings vergie, vrégie) is a unit of land area, a quarter of the old French arpent. The term derives from Latin virga (rod). Compare French verge (yard).

In the Channel Islands, it is a standard measure of land, but the statutory definition differs between the bailiwicks.

- In France, a vergée was 12,100 square Paris feet (1,276.8 m^{2}), equal to 25 square perches. The surveying perch measured 22 French feet.
- In French North America, it was also equal to 25 square perches, but the royal perch of 18 feet was used, yielding a vergée of 8100 square feet (854.7 m^{2})
- In Guernsey, a vergée (Guernésiais: vergie) is 17,640 square feet (1,639 m^{2}). It is 40 (square) Guernsey perches. A Guernsey perch (also spelt perque) is 21 feet by 21 feet.
- In Jersey, a vergée (Jèrriais: vrégie) is 19,360 square feet (1,798.6 m^{2}). It is 40 (square) Jersey perches. A Jersey perch (also spelt pèrque) is a square 24 pied de perche on each side (i.e. a square 22 imperial feet on each side).

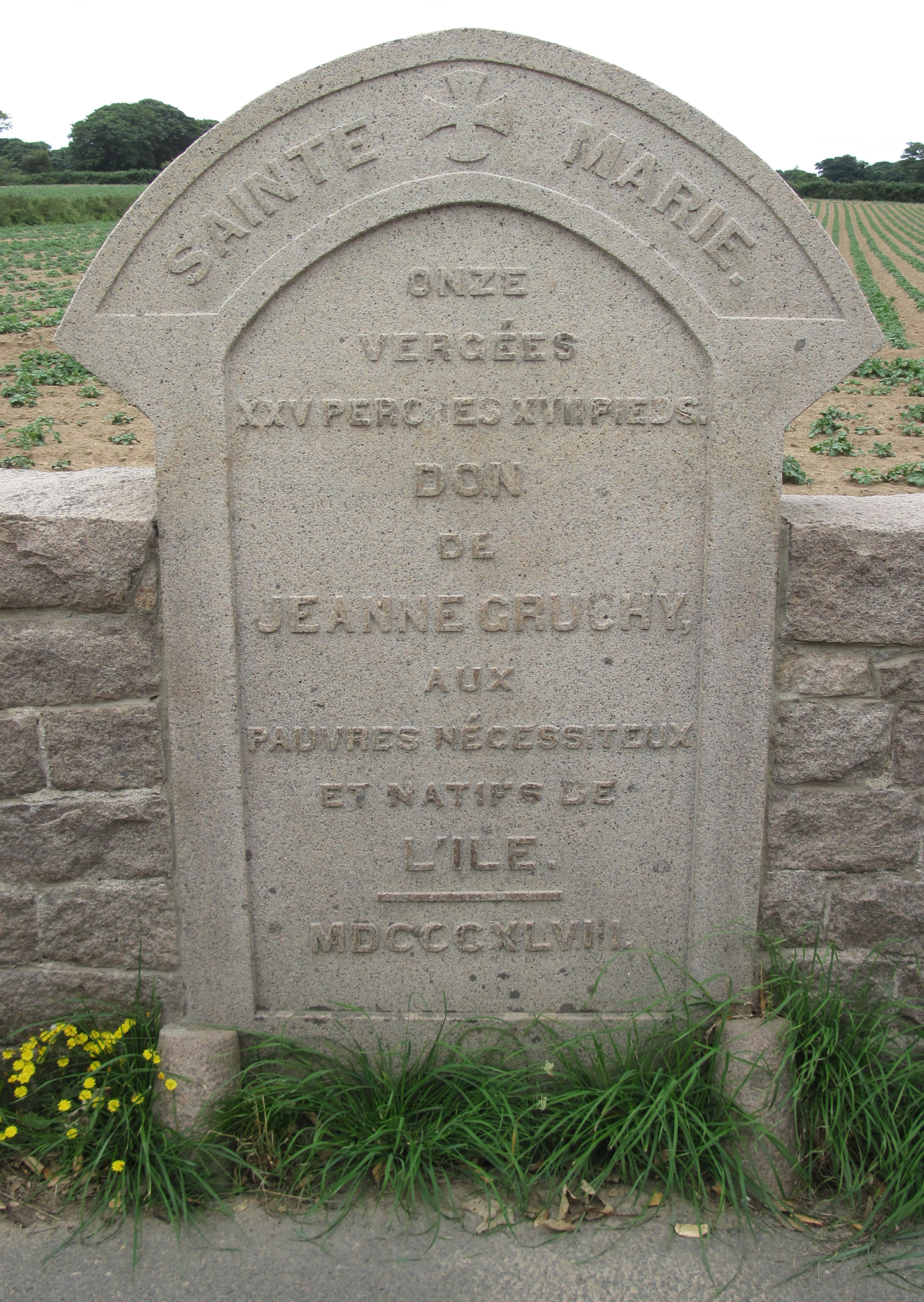
An inscribed stone describes this 11 vergée 25 perch clos des pauvres in Jersey

== Conversions ==
1 vergée (Guernsey) is equivalent to:

- 1 638.80963 m^{2}
- 0.404958678 acres

1 vergée (Jersey) is equivalent to:

- 1,798.60285 m^{2}
- 0.444444444 acres

== See also ==
- Units of measurement in France before the French Revolution
- Virgate
