= La Cotte de St Brelade =

Cave and archaeological site on Jersey, Channel Islands

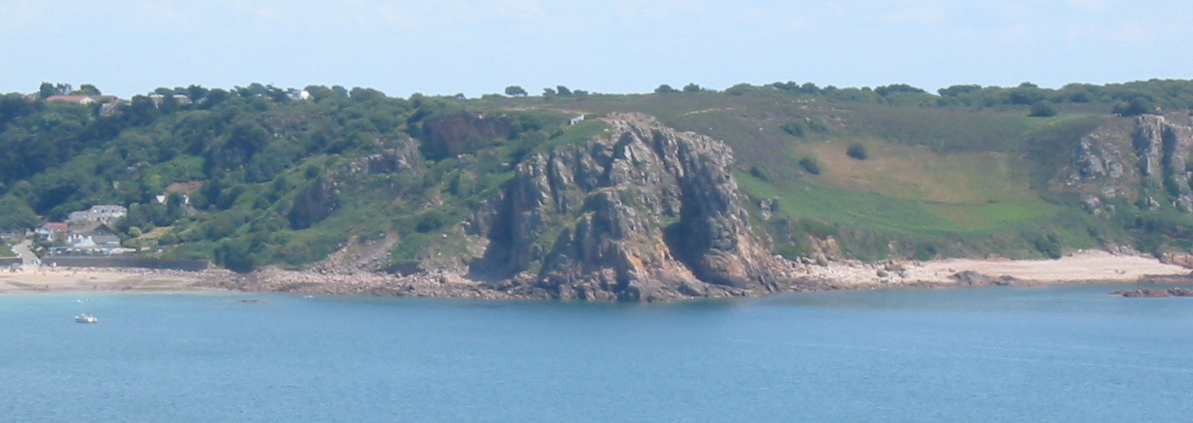
- La Cotte de St Brelade

- location in Jersey La Cotte de St Brelade (the United Kingdom)
- 49°10′32″N 2°11′18″W
- Periods: Paleolithic
- Associated with: Neanderthals
- Location: St Brelade
- Region: Jersey

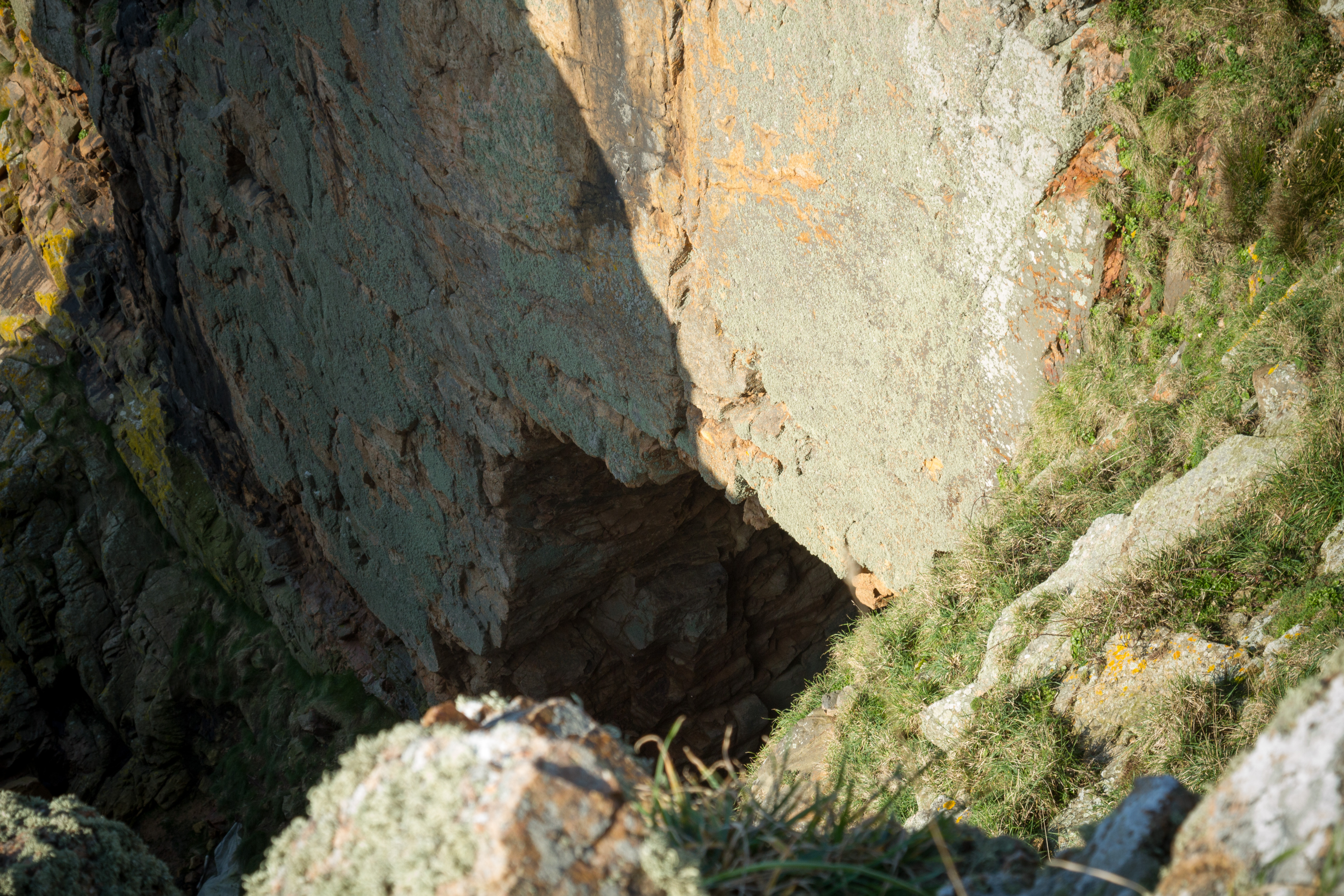
The cave

La Cotte de St Brelade is an archaeological site preserving a rich record of Middle Palaeolithic activity and Ice Age faunal remains. It is located in the parish of Saint Brélade, Jersey on the south west corner of the island. The place-name element Cotte means "cave" in Jèrriais, though the site may once have been known as La Grotte à la Fée (The Cave of the Fairies). The site was discovered in 1881 and has been investigated as part of several phases of excavation between 1910 and the present day. It is one of the richest Middle Palaeolithic sites in Europe and represents the most extensive sequence of Middle to Late Pleistocene Palaeolithic activity in north-west Europe. It is important for preserving a long history of repeated use of the site as a home base, two enigmatic Neanderthal bone structures and Pleistocene human fossils, which are extremely rare in this region.

It occupies a granite headland containing two deep ravines which are part of collapsed sea cave system. It originally preserved over 40m of deposits preserving as many as 13 separate episodes of occupation by Neanderthal groups. These deposits may extend as far back as 250,000 years ago and also preserve Middle Palaeolithic archaeology younger than 48,000 years ago.

This time span includes two previous global warm stages (inter-glacials) as well as two long cold stages; consequently the site provides a record for many different phases of environmental change from the fully temperate to extremely cold. For much of this time sea level was lower than it is now and the site would have sat within part of wider La Mancheland encompassing the other Channel Islands and with complete connection to present day France and La Cotte would have been a prominent landmark. During each warm stage, including the current Holocene one, sea level rise would have flooded the landscape, separating first Guernsey and the other Channel Islands, then Jersey and finally the Écréhous from the mainland.

The site is owned by the Société Jersiaise. It is managed by Jersey Heritage who, since 2014, have led a programme of engineering works and associated archaeological excavations aimed at preserving, stabilising and investigating the site. In 2022 the then Prince Charles, who had excavated at La Cotte de St Brelade as a student in 1968, became patron of the project to protect the site.

== Archaeological sequence ==
La Cotte de St Brelade's importance come from the length of its depositional sequence (over 200,000 years) and the richness of its archaeological layers. This means that, for the late Middle Pleistocene and Late Pleistocene, it is the most important archaeological sequence in northwestern Europe.

The sequence can be divided in two parts. There is an older set of deposits (Units H to A , 3 to 6.1) which possibly originate in Marine Isotope Stage 8 and extend through to the end of Marine Isotope Stage 6. There is then a younger set of deposits (Units 6.2 to 11) which cover Marine Isotope Stage 5e through to the Holocene. The two sets of deposits are separated by a fossil cliff relating to the truncation of the older deposits during the high sea level event of Marine Isotope Stage 5e.

Archaeological stone artefacts of Middle Palaeolithic character have been found in Units H, G, F, E, D, C, B, A, 3, 5 of the older deposits. This sequence, which might cover more than 50,000 years of time, shows a trend for decreasing us of flint and more use of other stone sources, especially quartz through time, more use of Levallois technique and specialised sharpening techniques to maximise the life of tool edges. The sheer volume of stone artefacts (74,397 artefacts from the McBurney excavations and possibly a similar amount from earlier investigations), associated with evidence for animal butchery and intense burning of bone in some levels suggest the site was a persistent place or home base. The later levels aren't precisely dated but appear to show multiple Middle Palaeolithic occupation episodes, with large quantities of mammalian bone being introduced to the site. The site has been characterised as a persistent place for successive Neanderthal populations, using the site at times as a seasonal residential base and sometimes for more specialised activities which might include the creation of structures and, potentially, funerary activity.

== Faunal remains ==
La Cotte de St Brelade is well known for a large accumulation of woolly mammoth and woolly rhinoceros bones, as well as other animals like wild horse, and lesser amounts of aurochs, red deer, reindeer, alpine chamois, Irish elk, Arctic fox and wolf. It was originally suggested that the mammoth remains were the result of a mass killing event as a result of Neanderthals driving herds of mammoths off the surrounding cliffs, but later analysis has questioned this assumption (though not questioning the Neanderthal accumulated nature of the mammoth bones), instead suggesting that these remains were gradually accumulated over a long period of time during its repeated intermittent occupation.

== Human remains ==
During the Société Jersiaise excavations of 1910 and 1911, eleven human teeth were found at La Cotte de St Brelade. They were recovered together in a mass of poorly preserved bone on a ledge in the cave wall underneath the arch of the North Ravine. The finds were associated with a Mousterian occupation level. In 1915, Ernest Daghorn found a human occipital to the south of the arch, within the West Ravine and around 5 metres above the level of the teeth, there is no association between the teeth and the skull fragment.

A 2021 study of the teeth concluded that they contained a mix of Homo neanderthalensis and Homo sapiens features. All 11 contain Neanderthal features such as distinctive root shapes (taurodontism) and large pulp chambers. However, 7 of the teeth also contain features associated with H. sapiens, such as the absence of transverse crests in premolars and the shape of the cervix in the pre-molars. The study also showed that, based on wear patterns, the teeth come from at least two adult individuals and both have combined H. neanderthalensis and H. sapiens characteristics. This could be suggestive of a population with a shared ancestry between the two species. A study of the remaining sediments in the West Ravine suggested the deposits from which the teeth were recovered could have dated to less than 47,000 years ago, this could put the teeth close in age to a period when Homo sapiens were moving into western Europe.

The occipital fragment was likely to have come from a juvenile individual and could be, on the basis of position, significantly younger than the teeth. There is nothing in the skull in terms of morphology which could suggest Neanderthal ancestry.

== Excavation timeline ==
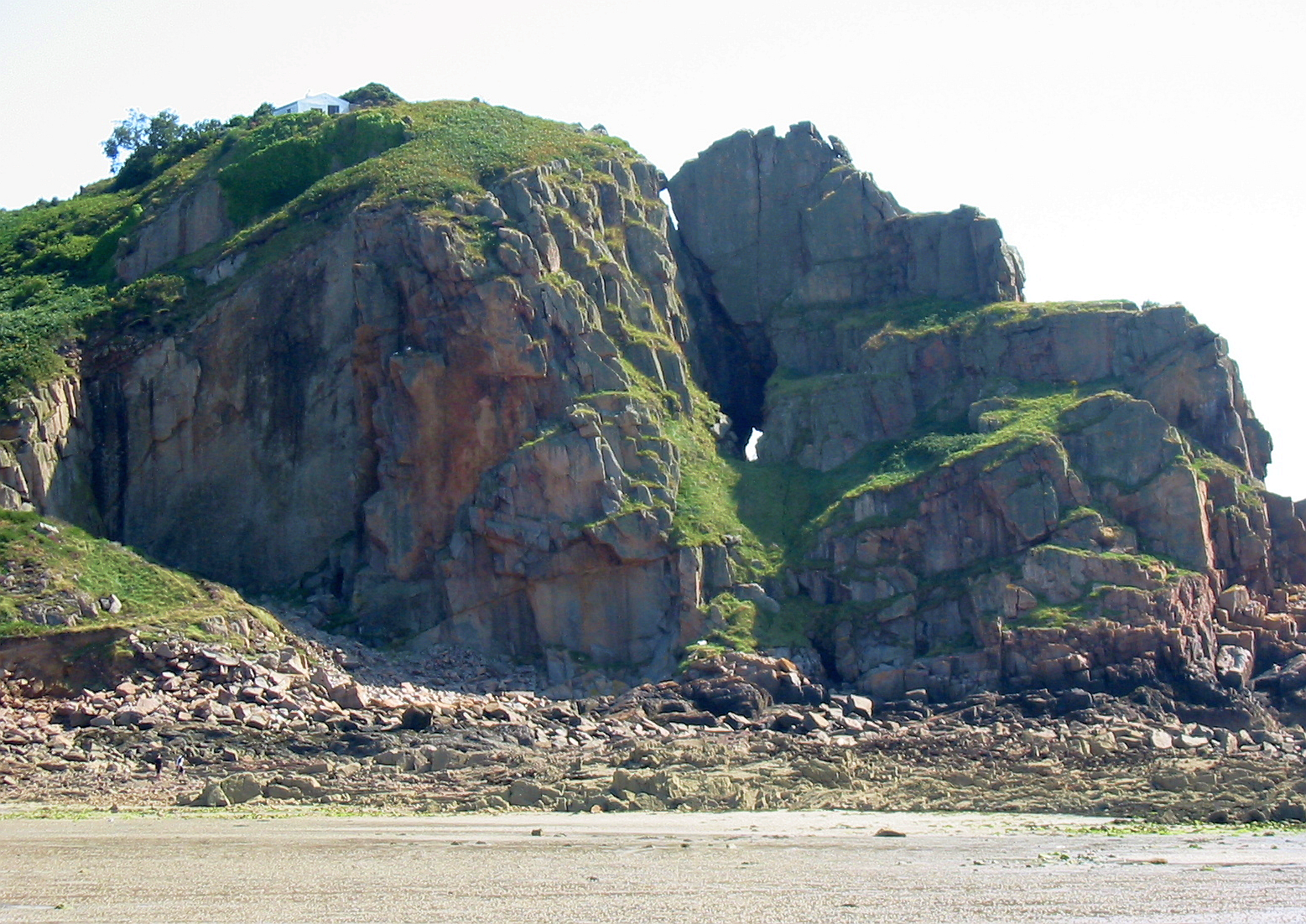
La Cotte dé Saint Brélade

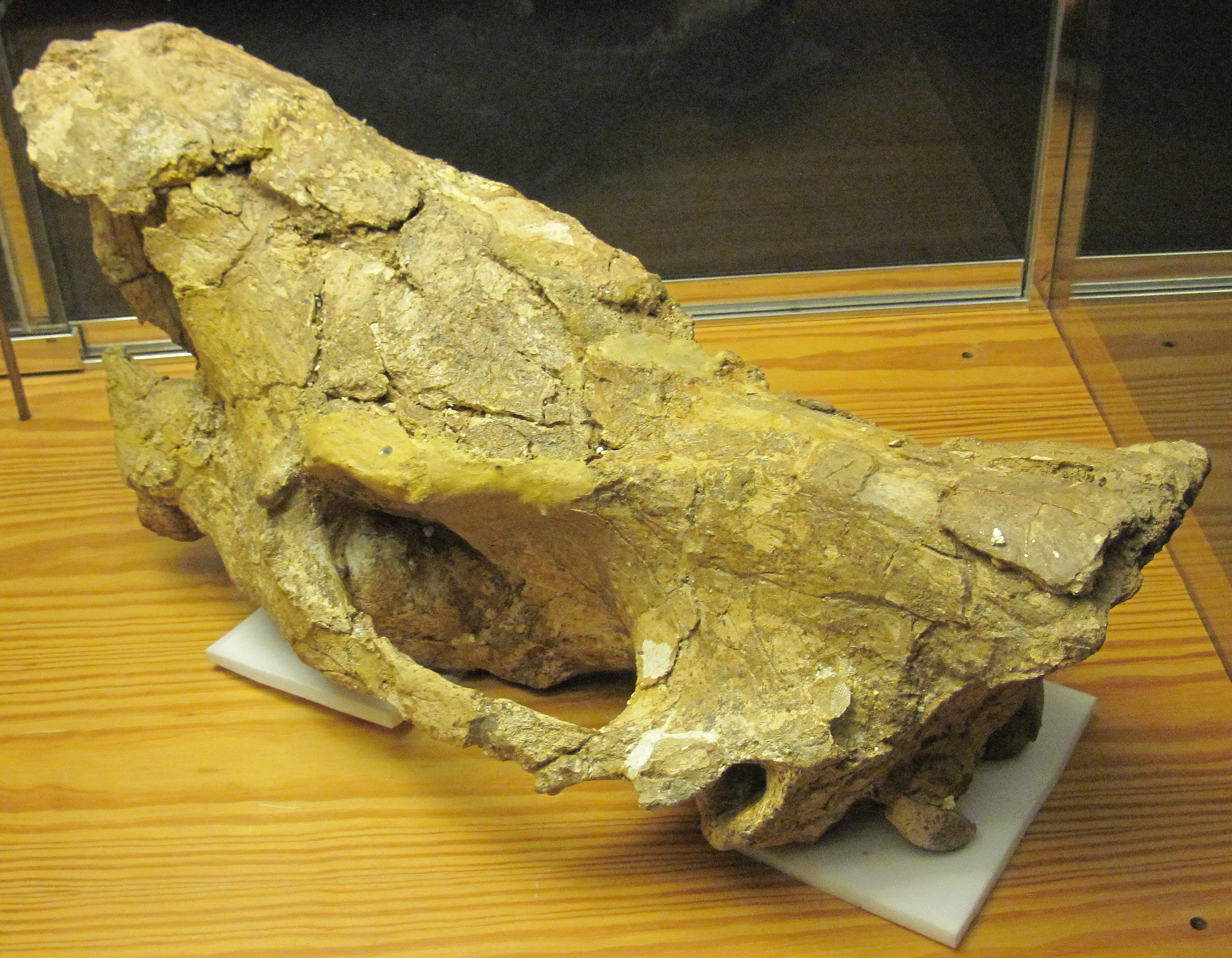
The rhinoceros skull

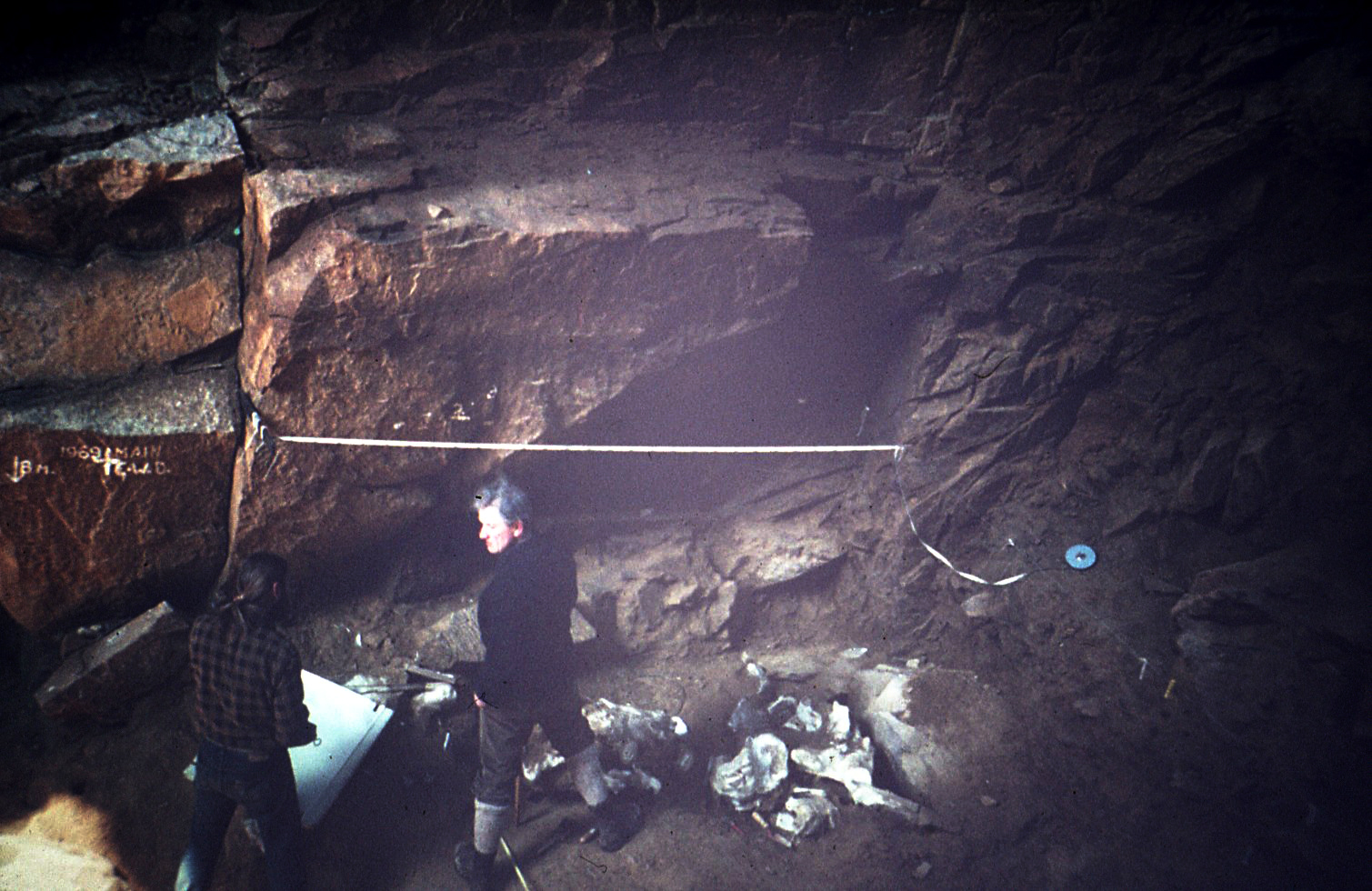
Charles McBurney mapping Layer 3 bone bed at La Cotte de St Brelade in 1976 with Cambridge student, Britt Bousman

Excavations have taken place from around 1910 onwards.

Robert R. Marett (1866–1943) worked on the palaeolithic site from 1910 to 1914, recovering some hominid teeth and other remains of habitation by Neanderthals. He published "The Site, Fauna, and Industry of La Cotte de St. Brelade, Jersey" (Archaeologia LXVII, 1916). The teeth were dated using new techniques in 2013, this analysis put them at between 100,000 and 47,000 years old.

In 1911, Arthur Smith Woodward (director of the geology department at the British Museum of Natural History) was asked by R.R. Marrett to inspected the findings at La Cotte. At the time, Woodward was engaged in the archaeological discovery of "Piltdown Man", which later became notorious as a hoax, and he used a comparison of findings at La Cotte to argue for an early dating of his Piltdown material.

The University of Cambridge excavations of the 1960s and 1970s found important examples of remains of Pleistocene mammals carried into La Cotte, including a pile of bones and teeth of woolly mammoth and woolly rhinoceros. King Charles III took part (as a student) in these excavations, directed by Professor Charles McBurney (archaeologist), which were later published.

Katharine Scott, in 1980, published an article on the hunting methods used by Neanderthals at La Cotte in which she argues that they stampeded and drove the mammoths off the nearby cliffs, but this theory has since been disputed.

In 2010 excavations were renewed at La Cotte by a multi-disciplinary team from British Institutions including UCL, The British Museum, the University of Southampton, University of Wales Trinity Saint David and the University of St Andrew's. These on-going excavations revealed new archaeological levels at the site and determined the presence of deposits younger than 47,000 years ago still present at the site.

== See also ==
- Archaeology of the Channel Islands
- La Hougue Bie
