= Jersey Society in London =

Membership society for the Bailiwick of Jersey

The Jersey Society in London is a membership society of people from all over the world interested in life, history and culture in the Bailiwick of Jersey. Nicholas Paines is the Chairman.

== Activities ==
Three times a year the Society holds a dinner meeting, followed by a quiz or talk, at Westminster Kingsway College, Vincent Square, London. There are sometimes speeches by the Chief Minister of the States of Jersey.

Boules and other events are held for the members.

== The Bulletin ==
The Bulletin is the journal of the Society, published twice a year, and sent to the members. There are articles on Jersey architectural history, a digest of Jersey news, and reports on the three Society meetings in London.

== See also ==
- Archaeology of the Channel Islands
- Guernsey Society
- Jersey Heritage
- Société Jersiaise
