= Frances Adams Le Sueur =

Botanist, ornithologist, and conservationist on the Channel Island of Jersey (1919–1995)

- Born: 6 August 1919
- Died: 17 May 1995 (aged 75)
- Scientific career
- Fields: Botany; Ornithology; Conservation biology

Frances Adams Le Sueur (née Ross; 6 August 1919 – 17 May 1995) was a botanist, ornithologist, and conservationist on the Channel Island of Jersey. She played a key role in the ornithology section of the Société Jersiaise, and documented various flora of the Jersey area in her book Flora of Jersey (1985). Along with her research work, Le Sueur worked for conservation of Jersey's flower population, campaigning before the island’s planning authorities to protect local flora of the Jersey area. She was an honorary member of the Société Jersiaise, and a study centre in Saint Ouen's Bay is named in her honour.

== Life ==
Le Sueur was born on 6 August 1919 in Carlisle, Cumbria. She won a scholarship to attend the Carlisle and County High School for Girls and later studied mathematics at Manchester University.

In 1948, Le Sueur began teaching mathematics at the Jersey College for Girls at La Pouquelaye. She spent the rest of her life on Jersey, where she became a respected botanist, ornithologist, and conservationist. She eventually became head of the school’s mathematics department. While she was an avid ornithologist, she also developed a deep interest in Jersey’s plant life.

Le Sueur met T.W. Attenborough, a senior pharmacist who provided invaluable knowledge of Jersey's flora and significantly influenced her botanical work. Most of her scientific efforts were conducted through her local natural science society, Société Jersiaise, where she contributed significantly to the ornithology section. In addition her book Flora of Jersey (1985), she published a paper on Cetti’s warblers, contributed to the Atlas of British Flora, and authored A Natural History of Jersey in 1976.

She also conducted research on the specimens collected in Jersey in the herbarium of the Canadian-French priest Frère Louis-Arsène. The collection had been donated to the Society J when Frere Louis-Arsène retired, and comprised plants collected on Jersey between 1922 and 1952. Le Sueur published her results in Watsonia in 1982, documenting some species which had been collected to extinction by Louis-Arsène. In 1982 she became the BSBI’s recorder for Jersey.

In 1975, she was elected an honorary member of the National Trust for Jersey. Le Sueur was made an honorary member of the Société Jersiaise in 1985.

She died on 17 May 1995. A study centre in Saint Ouen's Bay is named in her honour, and was opened by her husband Dick in 1996.
