= Société Jersiaise =

Charitable society promoting citizen science & culture

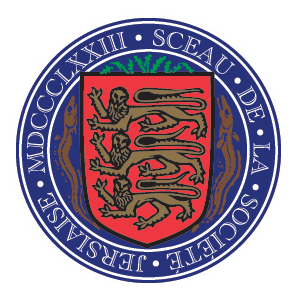
- The Seal of Société Jersiaise
- Formation: 1873
- Type: Charitable Society
- Registration no.: Registered Charity 114
- Purpose: Citizen science and culture - the study of and research into the archaeology, history, language, geology, natural history and science, art and culture, and natural and built environment, of Jersey
- Headquarters: 7 Pier Road, St Helier, Jersey
- Members: 1300 (approx.)
- Patrons: His Excellency, the Lieutenant Governor of Jersey; The Bailiff of Jersey; The Rt Hon. the Earl of Jersey
- President: Stuart Fell
- Chief Executive Officer: Rebecca J Bailhache BA (Hons)
- Publication: Annual Bulletin of the Société Jersiaise
- Website: www.societe.je

The Société Jersiaise (French pronunciation: [sɔsjete ʒɛʁsjɛz]) is a charitable society in Jersey which was founded in 1873.

== Aims ==
The aims of the Société Jersiaise are:

- the study of and research into the archaeology, history, language, geology, natural history and science, art and culture, and natural and built environment, of Jersey
- the dissemination of knowledge about them and encouragement to study and research them through education, publication, exhibition and by other means
- the preservation and conservation of them and of records pertaining to them
- the advancement of interest in all these aims.

== Membership ==
Membership is open to all with no requirement of any qualification or experience. The Société encourages the public through Société membership to become citizen participants in the field of research and study of science and culture and to support the wider aims of the Société.

The Société has the following categories of member who pay a subscription:

- Ordinary Members are members of the Société ordinarily resident in Jersey
- Overseas Members are members of the Société resident outside of Jersey.
- Student Members are Ordinary or Overseas Members aged sixteen (16) years or more and in full-time education.
- Junior Members are Ordinary Members under the age of sixteen (16) years.

The Société also has the following categories of member who do not pay a subscription:

- Patrons are distinguished persons, who may be invited at any time by the Board to accept the position of Patron.
- Membres d'Honneur are persons who have rendered special services to the Société, or those who have achieved special distinction in matters that are among the Aims and who are elected by members
- Bienfaiteurs are persons approved by the Board from among those who have made substantial contributions to the affairs of the Société, in money or in kind.
- Honorary Life Members are approved by the Board from among those Members or other persons who have rendered long and distinguished service to the Société.
- Corresponding Members are eminent persons, resident outside Jersey, approved by the Board for their ability to provide valuable links with research overseas.

The Société also offers Corporate Membership to bodies or organisations wishing to support the Société and which shall be entitled to such privileges of membership determined for each Corporate Member by the Board.

=== Membership benefits ===
1. Participation in charitable activities of the Société of research and study through its Sections (Citizen Science and Culture)
2. Knowing that as a member, membership supports all the charitable activities of the Société (Note 1)
3. Regular newsletters on the Société's activities
4. Invitations to attend Members Only Société events
5. Advance notice of Société events / conferences open to the public
6. Access without charge to subscription-based online resources
7. Access and use free of charge of the Lord Coutanche Library and Research Centre
8. Discounted image licensing fees of the Photographic Archive
9. A free copy of the Annual Bulletin
10. A discount (10%) on most books in its bookshop
11. Free admission to all Jersey Heritage museum and castle sites

Note 1: These include the, the Lord Coutanche Library and Research Centre, and the activities of the Archaeology and Photographic Archive departments, the Publications Committee and the Sections, as well as the maintenance of the Sites of Special Interest around the Island owned or managed by the Société.

== Citizen Science and Culture through the Sections ==
The Société uses the term "citizen science and culture" to mean research and study conducted with participation by members of the public who are amateur/nonprofessional researchers or participants of science, social science and many other disciplines. It can also be used to mean working as part of a collaborative effort or project with professional scientists and academics working in a wider field, particularly in relation to the collection of data or information.

Being a member of one of the Société Jersiaise's many Sections, enables ordinary members of the public to participate in such research and study. It connects the Société and its members to international professional researchers and academics, allowing them to participate in wider teams working in the relevant fields.

It is not necessary to have professional qualifications or experience in the relevant field, just a keen interest and enthusiasm and a willingness to learn through participation.

The Société is a unique charitable organisation within Jersey which allows ordinary "citizens" to participate in this way.

=== The Sections ===
The Société has the following Sections in the fields of science and culture: Archaeology, Architecture, Bibliography, Botany, Entomology, Environment, Geology, History, La Langue Jèrriaise, Marine Biology, Meteorology, Mycology, Numismatics, Ornithology, and Zoology.

Links to Section website pages:

- Archaeology
- Architecture
- Bibliography
- Botany
- Entomology
- Environment
- Geology
- History
- La Langue Jèrriaise
- Marine Biology
- Meteorology
- Mycology
- Numismatics
- Ornithology
- Zoology.

Each of the Sections have existing projects and programmes, as well as developing new ones, to further the aims of the Société. In doing so, they record, expand and disseminate knowledge to enable new discoveries and theories to be made and developed.

== Departments and other resources ==
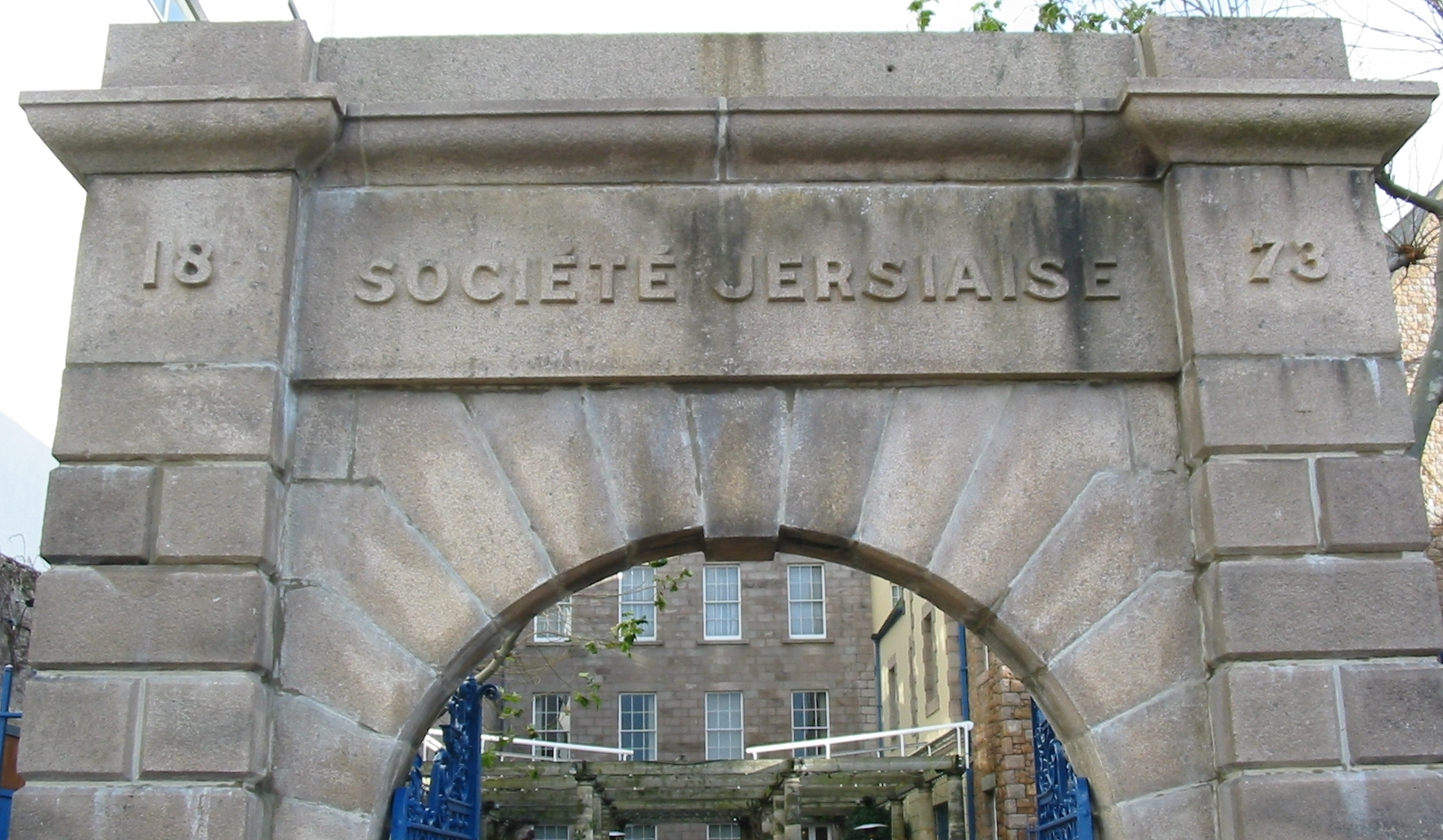
Société Jersiaise arch 1873

=== Publications Committee ===
Much of the work of the Société is published in its Annual Bulletin which was first published in 1875. In addition, the Société has sought to publish or support the publishing of works of its members and others in furtherance of its aims. In its early years the Société published many primary sources, such as the Cartulaire des Îles and Actes des États de Jersey, and still does so, to enable its members and others to carry out primary research.

Copies of the Annual Bulletin have been digitised and are available to view on the Société's website.

=== Lord Coutanche Library ===
The Société's library contains much unique and important material about Jersey and comparative academic literature in the form of published works and manuscript documents including maps. In recent years, a project was started to digitise the many periodicals and other documents in its possession. The Société employs a professional librarian and assistant. The Lord Coutanche Library is available to members without charge, and to other researchers upon payment of a small fee.

=== Photographic Archive ===
The Société Jersiaise Photographic Archive contains, as a result of the foresight of early members, by far the most important collection of historic photographic images of the island. A professional photographic archivist and assistant are employed by the Société to manage the collection of approximately 100,000 images dating from the mid-1840s to the present day.

=== Field Archaeology Department ===
The Société employs a professional field archaeologist in their Field Archaeology Department. The department carries out archaeological research projects, scientific collaborations with independent, official and academic entities and organises talks and events. Each year, the department also provides experience opportunities and help with research and other projects to archaeology and other students. Archaeology and Numismatics Sections are assisted by the department in their activities and also assist the department.

=== Museum collections ===
Since its formation, the Société built up extensive museum collections containing items on all aspects of Jersey life, in particular Jersey's archaeological heritage. The collections are now curated by Jersey Heritage under the agreement with them. These collections remain the only substantial collection of Jersey material and is continually expanded by purchase and donation of new pieces where the opportunity arises, and it is appropriate to preserve and/or retain them in Jersey.

== Archaeological and other sites owned / managed by the Société ==
One of the aims of the Société is the preservation and conservation of archaeology within Jersey. Through generous gifts and purchases made with foresight, a number of important archaeological and other sites are owned, leased or managed by the Société. Most of these sites are accessible by members of the public, but access may be limited or not possible as indicated.

Most of these sites are listed as Sites of Special Interest (SSI) and are protected by law from activities causing or which may cause any damage to them, which includes digging, picking and removal of protected flora, disturbing fauna and birds, and metal detecting.

- La Motte (Green Island), St Clement: tidal access
- Mont Ubé dolmen, St Clement: public footpath
- La Hougue Bie, Grouville: Jersey Heritage managed site - subject to admission fee
- La Pouquelaye de Faldouet, St Martin: path from public road
- Le Couperon, St Martin: path, right of way
- Les Houguillons cist in circle, Trinity: path, right of way
- Land at Egypte woods, Trinity: next to public footpaths - no paths across it
- Lavoir de St Cyr and Lime Kiln, St John: Lavoir at roadside; Lime kiln on private property - access by arrangement
- Hamptonne, St Lawrence: owned by National Trust for Jersey and managed by Jersey Heritage - subject to admission fee
- La Bergerie, St Ouen: by roadside
- La Hougue des Geonnais, St Ouen: path from public road
- Mont Grantez dolmen, St Ouen: right of way over field
- Les Blanches Pierres, St Brelade: on public land
- La Sergenté corbelled tomb, St Brelade: path, right of way
- La Cotte de St Brelade, St Brelade: no access for safety reasons
- Ville ès Nouaux dolmen and cist in a circle, St Helier: on public land

== Governance ==
The Société is a Jersey registered charity under the Charities (Jersey) Law 2014, registered number 114.

The Société is managed by a Board composed of the President, two vice-presidents, the Honorary Treasurer and six other members all elected by the Members. There are several committees of the Board to manage the Société departments: Publications, Library, Photographic Archive and Field Archaeology.

The Société employs a Chief Executive Officer who is responsible for implementing the decisions of the Board and the day-to-day administration. The Chief Executive Officer is supported by a small number of staff.

Each of the Sections have a Chair, and most have a Secretary, who report to the Board via the chief executive officer.

== Funding ==
The Société receives no Government of Jersey funding.

The Société's funding derives from legacies, gifts, donations, grants from charitable trusts and funds, members' subscription income, rental income, investment income and income from charitable activities.

== Relationship with Jersey Heritage ==
By an agreement with the Government of Jersey in 1987, the Jersey Museum and La Hougue Bie Museum, which had been established and run by the Société, became part of the Jersey Museums Service run by Jersey Heritage Trust. The collections of the Société became curated by Jersey Heritage and are displayed or stored under this agreement. In return, the Société received a rental payment for the buildings and property, consisting of the Jersey Museum and La Hougue Bie Museum, and Société members retained the right of free admission to those sites together with the two castles (Mont Orgueil and Elizabeth) belonging to the Government of Jersey which were added to the Jersey Museums Service.

The following sites which are open to the public are presently administered and cared for by Jersey Heritage:

- The Jersey Museum, St Helier (owned by the Société)
- La Hougue Bie, Grouville (owned by the Société)
- Hamptonne (owned by the National Trust for Jersey, of which the Société has a usufruit)
- Mont Orgueil Castle, St Martin (owned by the Jersey Government)
- Elizabeth Castle, St Aubin's Bay (owned by the Jersey Government)
- Maritime Museum and Occupation Tapestry Gallery, St Helier
- Sir Francis Cook Gallery, Trinity (may be visited by arrangement)
- Jersey Archive, St Helier (user's card required)

Other than as indicated, Société members are admitted free of charge on production of a current membership card.

== Awards and scholarships ==
The Société makes awards and grants scholarships in various fields as follows:

- Millennium Research Fund - to promote high-quality academic or scholarly study of Jersey's history and cultural heritage
- Barreau Art Scholarship - to assist in the study of art
- Roderick Dobson Award - to support those who are producing work in the field of natural history
- Nigel Querée Award - to recognise environmental research, field work and other projects
- Averil Picot Art Scholarship - to assist in the study of art at higher education at degree or foundation degree level

== History ==
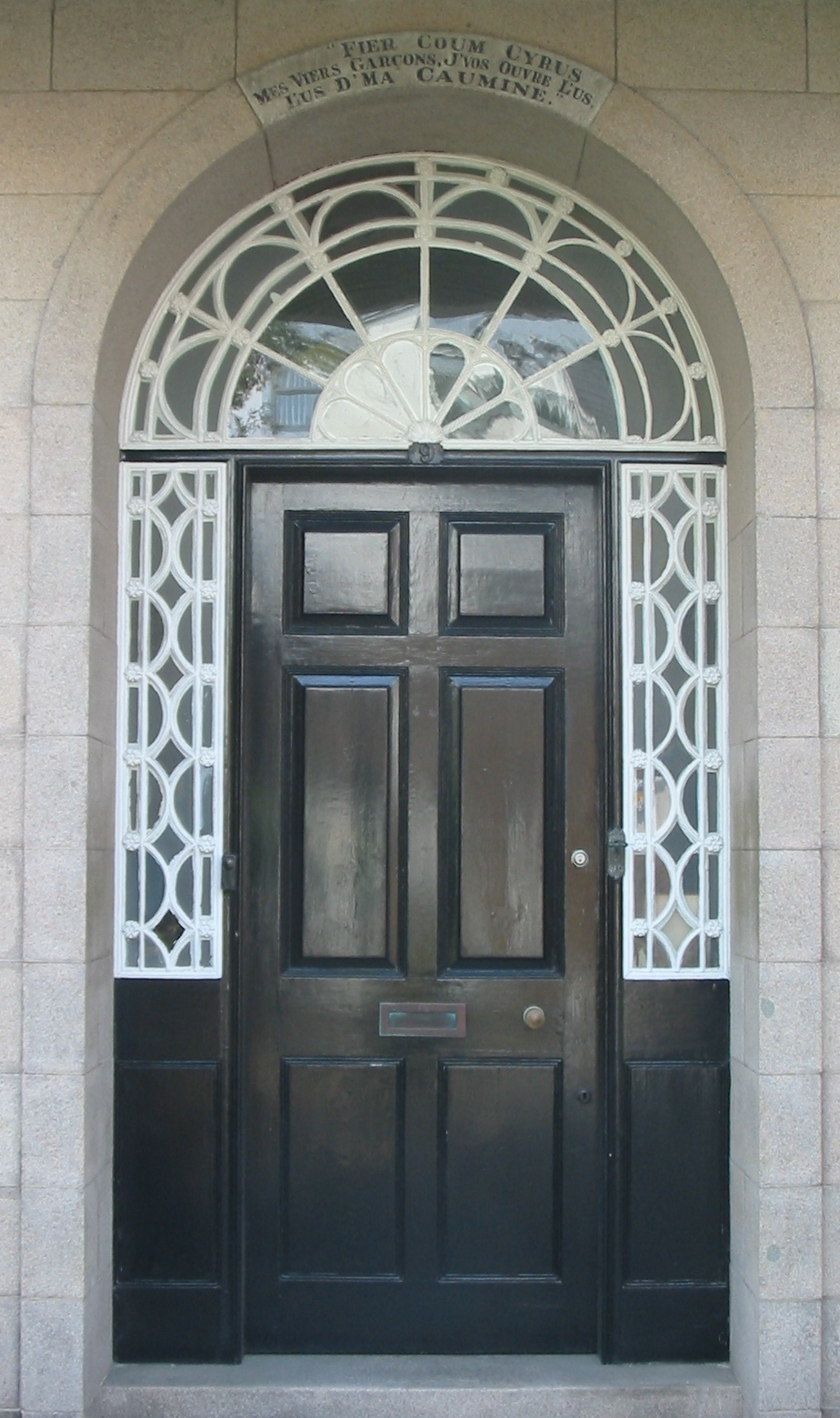
Door of 9 Pier Road, Saint Helier, Jersey – house given to La Société Jersiaise for use as museum (now part of the Jersey Museum). Motto over door reads: Fier coum Cyrus, mes viers garçons, j'vos ouvre l'us, l'us d'ma caumine (Proud as Cyrus, my old boys, I open to you the door, the door of my cottage)

On 28 January 1873 a meeting of notables of the island took place to discuss the formation of a learned society for the preservation of the island's archaeological, historical and linguistic heritage, perceived to be threatened by the expansion of St Helier and coastal development. Those present were aware of the foundation of similar societies in mainland Normandy, such as Société des Antiquaires de Normandie (founded 1824) and similar county societies in the United Kingdom.

In 1879, the Société was incorporated by Act of the States of Jersey, the first such entity to be incorporated in that way.

In 1893 the Société was given a large townhouse in Pier Road, Saint Helier which became the base for its operations including its library and museum.

In 1913 the various branches of activity were formalised into 'sections', amongst the first being Archaeology and History. The Section structure still exists and now consists of some 15 sections.

From its inception the Société engaged in archaeological work at numerous sites around the island; most importantly beginning work at La Cotte de St Brelade in 1905, a Neanderthal site of international importance.

In 1919 the Société purchased the important Neolithic site of La Hougue Bie, excavating it in 1924 revealing a Neolithic chambered passage grave c.4000BC. The site was then restored and opened as a museum. Other archaeological sites were also acquired by gift or purchase in order to protect and preserve them.

The Société flourished throughout the 20th century, notwithstanding the difficult years of the German military occupation of the Channel Islands between 1940 and 1945. Despite the severe hardships and lack of resources suffered by the island, the museum at Pier Road remained open throughout the Occupation, but despite protestations La Hougue Bie museum was requisitioned for military purposes by the Nazi occupiers.

Post-war the Société continued to grow and add to its collections to the extent that during the 1970s a new headquarters was built adjoining the Pier Road Museum. In 1973, it celebrated its one-hundredth anniversary.

In 1987 the Société entered into an agreement with the States of Jersey for its museums to be run by the Jersey Heritage Trust, whilst retaining ownership of its collections. This enabled the Société to concentrate on its core activities of research and publication.

In 1990 the Société also entered into a working partnership with the National Trust for Jersey which its members had helped to found in 1937, to develop a country life museum at Hamptonne, St Lawrence, a late medieval farm with manorial pretensions, the National Trust purchasing the property, the Société financing the restoration.

On 14 May 2019, the Société was registered as a charity under the Charities (Jersey) Law 2014, with registered number 114.

In 2023, the Société celebrated its one hundred and fiftieth anniversary with a series of special events, a conference and publications.

== The Seal of the Société ==
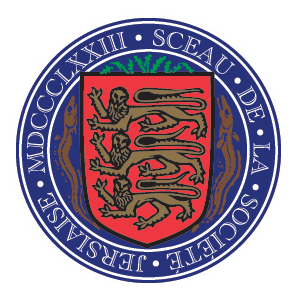
The Seal of the Société Jersiaise

The seal of the Société has the following elements:

1. The shield and arms as used by Edward I (the Plantagenet three leopards rampant).
2. Conger eels either side of the shield to represent the former significant conger eel fishing industry within Jersey
3. Fonds of seaweed ("varech" or "vraic") at the top of the shield which refer to the widespread use of seaweed as an agricultural fertiliser.

The first element is the royal seal bearing Edward I's arms which in or prior to 1296, he gave to the Bailiffs of Jersey and Guernsey

The second and third elements are marine products which are recognised to have contributed to the welfare of the Island from the earliest historical times.

== Membres d'Honneur, Benefactors and Honorary Life Members ==
The Société recognises Membres d'Honneur, Benefactors (Bienfaiteurs) and Honorary Life Members.

Membres d'Honneur are persons who have rendered special services to the Société, or those who have achieved special distinction in matters that are among the Aims and who are elected by members.

Benefactors (Bienfaiteurs) are persons approved by the Board from among those who have made substantial contributions to the affairs of the Société, in money or in kind.

Honorary Life Members are approved by the Board from among those Members or other persons who have rendered long and distinguished service to the Société.

== Notable Past Jersey Members ==
Notable past members from Jersey who have excelled in the fields of science, history, art and culture include:

- Dr Robert Ranulph Marett, the leading early evolutionary anthropologist, whose father Robert Pipon Marett was a founder member
- Dr Arthur Mourant FRS, a noted haematologist
- George Reginald Balleine, prominent writer, historian and clergyman
- Frances Adams Le Sueur, botanist, ornithologist, and conservationist
- Frank Le Maistre, author, linguist and journalist
- John St Helier Lander, portrait painter
- Edmund Blampied, painter

== See also ==
- Archaeology of the Channel Islands
- Jersey Heritage
- Jersey Society in London
