= Archaeology of the Channel Islands =

Archaeology is promoted in Jersey by the Société Jersiaise and by Jersey Heritage. Promotion in the Bailiwick of Guernsey being undertaken by La Société Guernesiaise, Guernsey Museums, the Alderney Society with World War II work also undertaken by Festung Guernsey.

Archaeologists in each island give regular talks on their work and summer digs in the islands usually require helpers and volunteers.

Interest in the archaeology of the islands is first recorded in the 16th century. By the 18th century articles were being published in magazines with engravings explaining interesting historic sites.

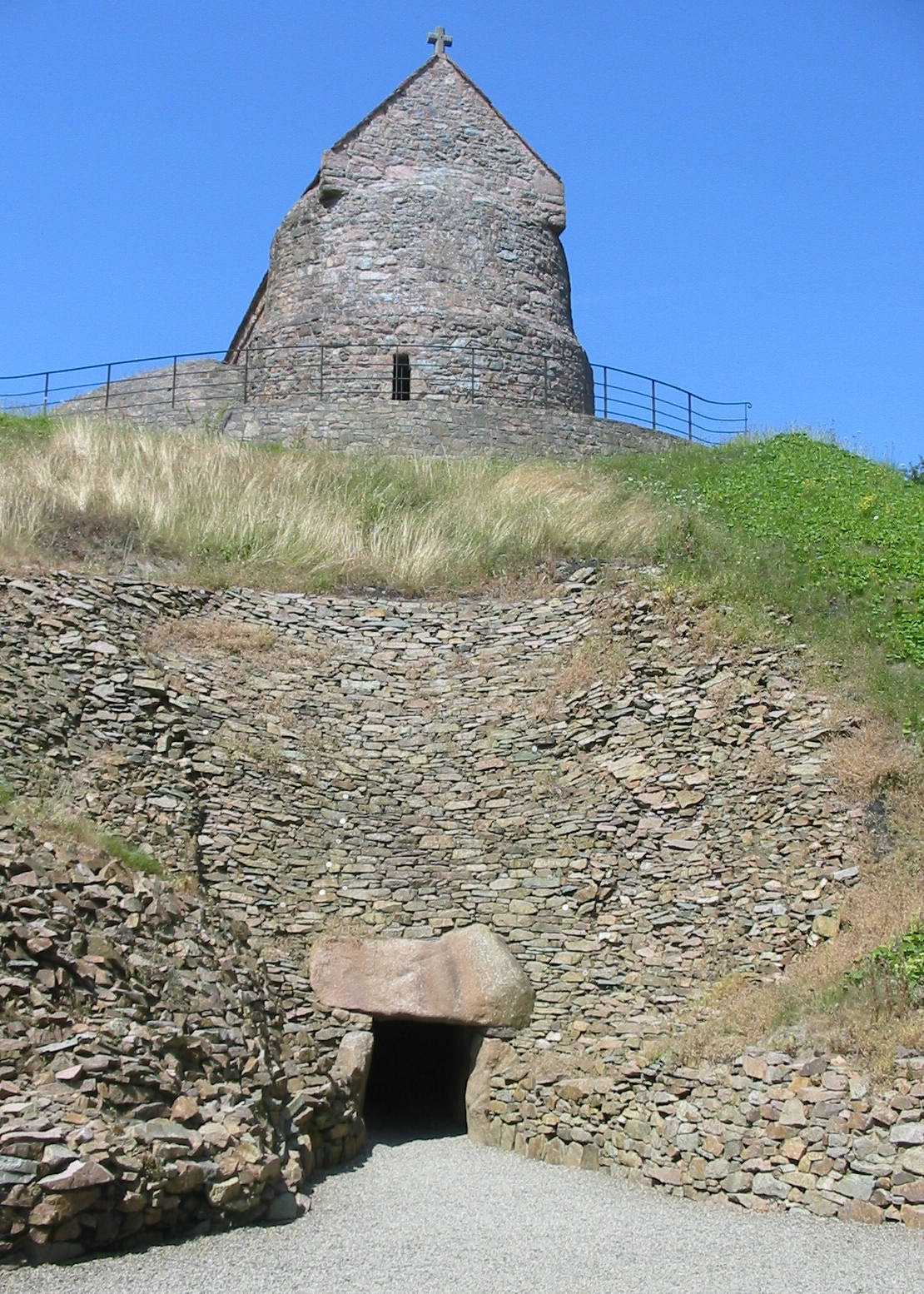
La Hougue Bie entrance and chapel, Jersey

== Bailiwick of Jersey ==
The Société Jersiaise was founded in 1873. Over the years the Société Jersiaise has purchased archaeological sites for preservation and presentation, the two most important sites are La Hougue Bie, purchased in 1919, and La Cotte de Saint-Brélade, purchased in 1955.

The Museum, founded in 1893 by the Société Jersiaise and its extensive Museum collections are now looked after by Jersey Heritage. Jersey Heritage, founded in 1981, is a local charity that protects and promotes the Island’s rich heritage and cultural environment.

Planning permissions may include a requirement for archaeological monitoring and/or works. In 2014, 24 planning permissions included this requirement. Jersey Heritage reach out to engage the public, for example in 2014, the Société Jersiaise held a programme of archaeological events as part of the nationwide Council for British Archaeology Festival.

== Bailiwick of Guernsey ==
Guernsey Museums holds a wide range of archaeological collections. The Museums also holds important collections of antiquarian finds, dominated by 250 prehistoric stone tools, mostly gathered together by the Lukis family mainly in the 1830s and 1840s.

Guernsey employs a States Archaeologist who undertakes excavations or who approves visiting archaeologists.

Long-term projects have included:

- Herm. Island of the dead? The buried Neolithic landscape of Herm being undertaken by Durham University
- Stepping stones to the Neolithic? Islands, maritime connectivity and the 'western seaways' of Britain, 5,000-3,500 BC by the Universities of Reading, Southampton and Liverpool.
- Alderney Nunnery, undertaken by Guernsey Museums

Maritime archaeology is similarly regulated and protected by laws, with displays at the Shipwreck Museum at Fort Grey and the Maritime Museum at Castle Cornet

The “Guernsey Sites and Monument Record” is compiled and maintained by the Archaeology Officer. It is a register of known archaeological sites and find spots within the Bailiwick of Guernsey, including Ancient Monuments.

Sections of early archaeological evidence on Alderney has sadly been destroyed, firstly during the Victorian era of quarrying and building fortifications and later by the German occupiers repeating the process. However the Alderney Society is thriving and has an excellent museum.

== Sea level changes in the Channel Islands ==
Understanding the changes to the sea level is vital when considering the early archaeology of the islands. The islands were never covered in ice, but suffered early erosion from rivers such as the Seine and Ay.

Over the last million years sea levels have changed significantly. 800,000 years ago sea levels were likely to have been 35 m higher than now. This fell gradually, with the formation of ice elsewhere and the land rising, to 30 m higher than now around 400,000 years ago to 21 m 300,000 years ago, to 13 m 200,000 years ago to 2 m 120,000 years ago, when it was thought a catastrophic outburst flood permanently diverted the Rhine into the English Channel. Sea levels continued to fall, but more rapidly over the next 100,000 years.

Looking at the last 20,000 years, which started with a glacial period, the sea level was around 100 m lower than now, making the sea coast some 120 km west of the islands. There followed a dramatic rise: by 9,400 BC the sea had risen to come close to where it now lies, but with the islands still connected to mainland France. The separation of Alderney probably occurred first, the Guernsey/Sark landmass occurred around 9,200 BC with the Bailiwick of Guernsey becoming separate islands of Guernsey, Sark and Herm around 5,000 BC. Jersey being finally separated from the French coast about 1,000 years later, although there are traditions that a land bridge between Jersey and France lasted until finally broken in a storm or series of storms in 709 AD, the same storm separating Herm from Jethou.

The islands contain raised beaches, including one 8–9 m above current heights from about 130,000 years ago and evidence of a forest (in Vazon Bay, Guernsey) below the current sea levels. There are very high tides and swift currents in the Mont Saint-Michel Bay which caused additional erosion between Jersey and the French coast.

== Buildings, key archaeology sites and evidence from various periods ==
=== Palaeolithic period ===
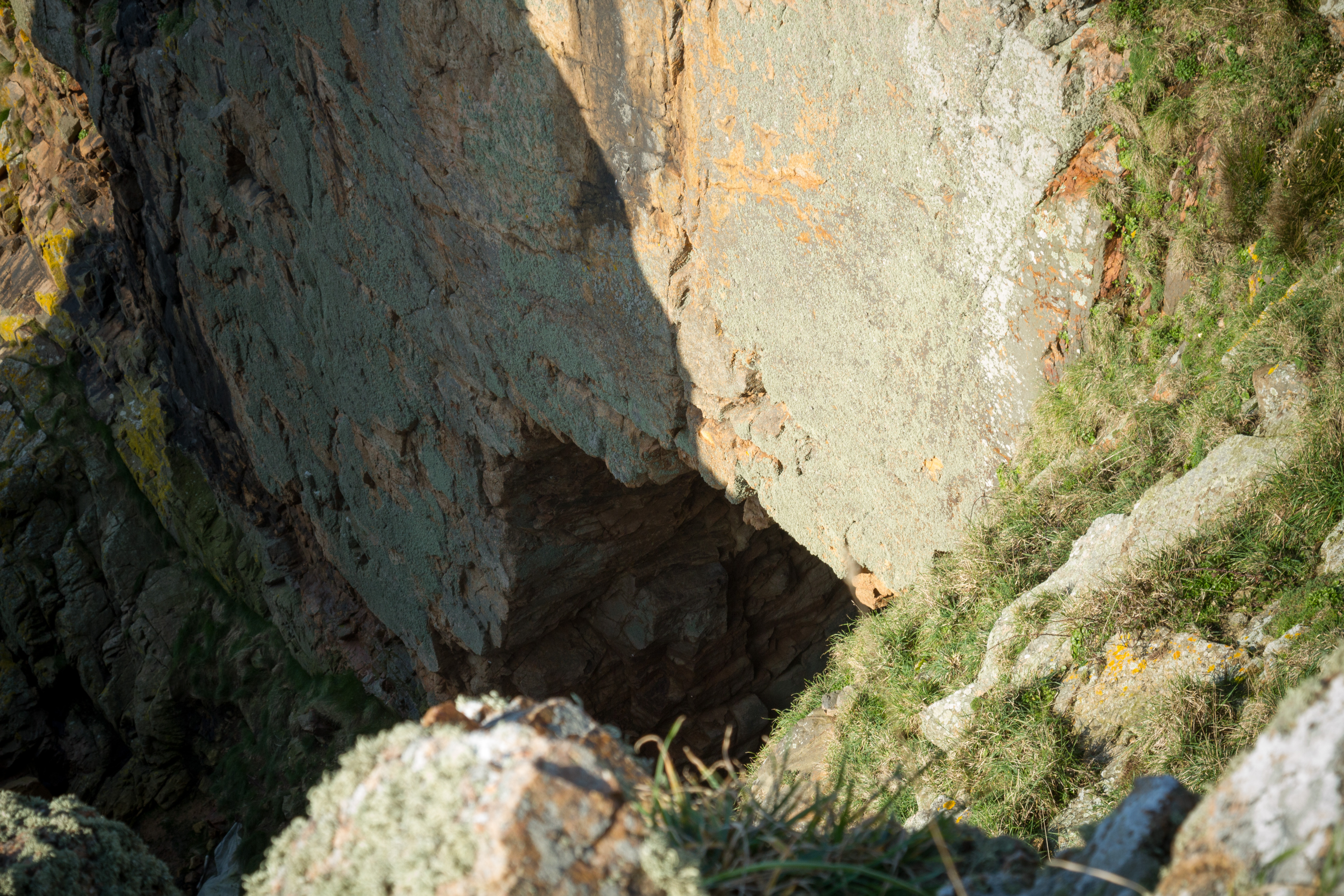
Cave at La Cotte de St Brelade

Whilst connected to mainland Europe.

- La Cotte de St Brelade, Jersey. First investigated in 1904. The Site was first occupied by humans in the Middle Paleolithic, 240,000 years ago based on thermoluminescence dating, during a cold glacial period when most of the present seabed would have been uncovered. Dated at approximately 180,000 BP, two impressive piles of animal bones, of mammoths and woolly rhinoceros, are located beneath an overhang having been butchered.
- La Cotte à la Chèvre is a small cave in Jersey. Flints and a hand axe have been found here, also indicating Neanderthal occupation.

=== Ice Age period ===
14,000 BC – 12,000 BC whilst connected to mainland Europe following extinction of Neanderthals.

- Over 3,000 stone tools and Ice Age engravings dating from at least 12,000 BC have been found at Les Varines site in south east Jersey, showing occupation by Homo sapiens.

=== Mesolithic period ===
12,000 BC to 4,500 BC when rising sea levels created the islands.

- La Cotte de St Brelade was also found to have had more recent human occupants, flint and stone tools, animal bones and hearths have been found in the cave.
- On Jethou evidence of flint manufacturing in an area exposed only at low water between the island and Crevichon shows occupation around 10,000 BC.
- There is evidence on Little Sark of human farming dating from around 5,000 BC.
- A number of sites show evidence of Mesolithic communities including Lihou and the Royal Hotel site in Guernsey and Les Landes, Jersey.

=== Neolithic period ===
4,500 BC –1,800 BC

The archaeological community debate whether the Neolithic Revolution was brought to the British Isles through adoption by natives, or by migrating groups of continental Europeans who settled there, however evidence of a farming lifestyle exists in Guernsey from the start of the Neolithic period, a thousand years earlier than on mainland Britain. Sites excavated include:

==== Jersey ====
- La Hougue Bie, Jersey. Excavated in 1924. Neolithic ritual site which was in use around 3,500 BC comprising an 18.6-metre-long (61 ft) passage chamber covered by a 12.2-metre-high (40 ft) earth mound. Grave goods comprising mainly pottery were found. The tomb is aligned to allow sunlight to enter on the equinoctial sunrise.

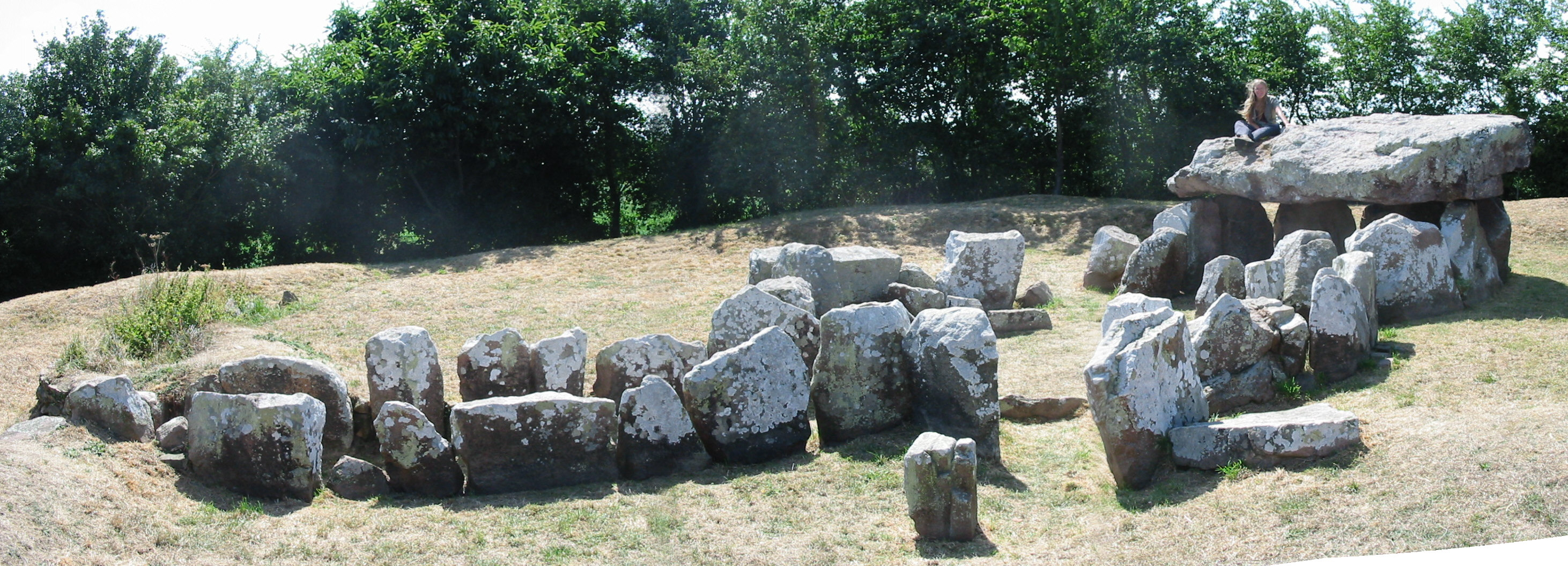
Dolmen La Pouquelaye de Faldouet Jersey

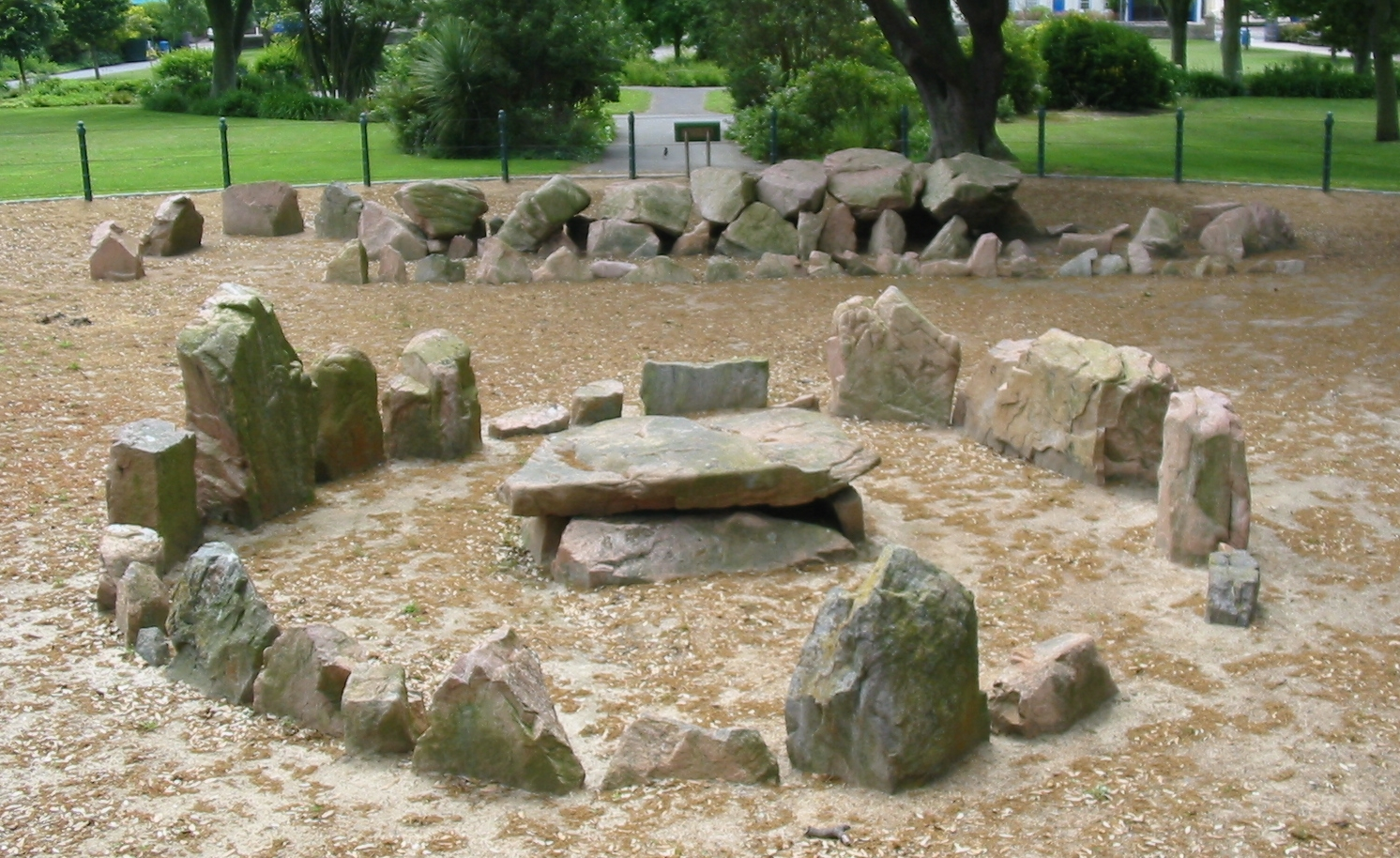
Dolmen La Ville ès Nouaux, Jersey

- Dolmens exist in a number of places in Jersey including:
  - La Pouquelaye de Faldouet
  - Les Monts de Grantez, contained 6 adults and a child and tools including a spindle whorl.
  - La Sergenté, early and unusual in that it was covered with a round mound.
  - Mont Ubé

Are passage graves and finds include human bones, urns, pottery, axes, flints and a polished stone pendant.

- La Hougue des Géonnais is a passage chamber. Pottery, flint scrapers, arrowheads and broken querns were found.
- Le Couperon is a gallery grave surrounded by a ring of eighteen outer stones, flint and pottery were found.
- La Table des Marthes is possibly a huge capstone. Pottery, burnt stones and broken stone axes were found.
- La Hougue Boëte, a closed megalithic cist with round mound 9 m high containing a man, horse and axe.
- Ville-ès-Nouaux, a long chamber and cist in circle Inside were found nine beaker type pots protected by stone slabs and six were Jersey bowls. An archers wrist guard was also found.
- At least 10 menhirs are located around the island.

==== Guernsey ====
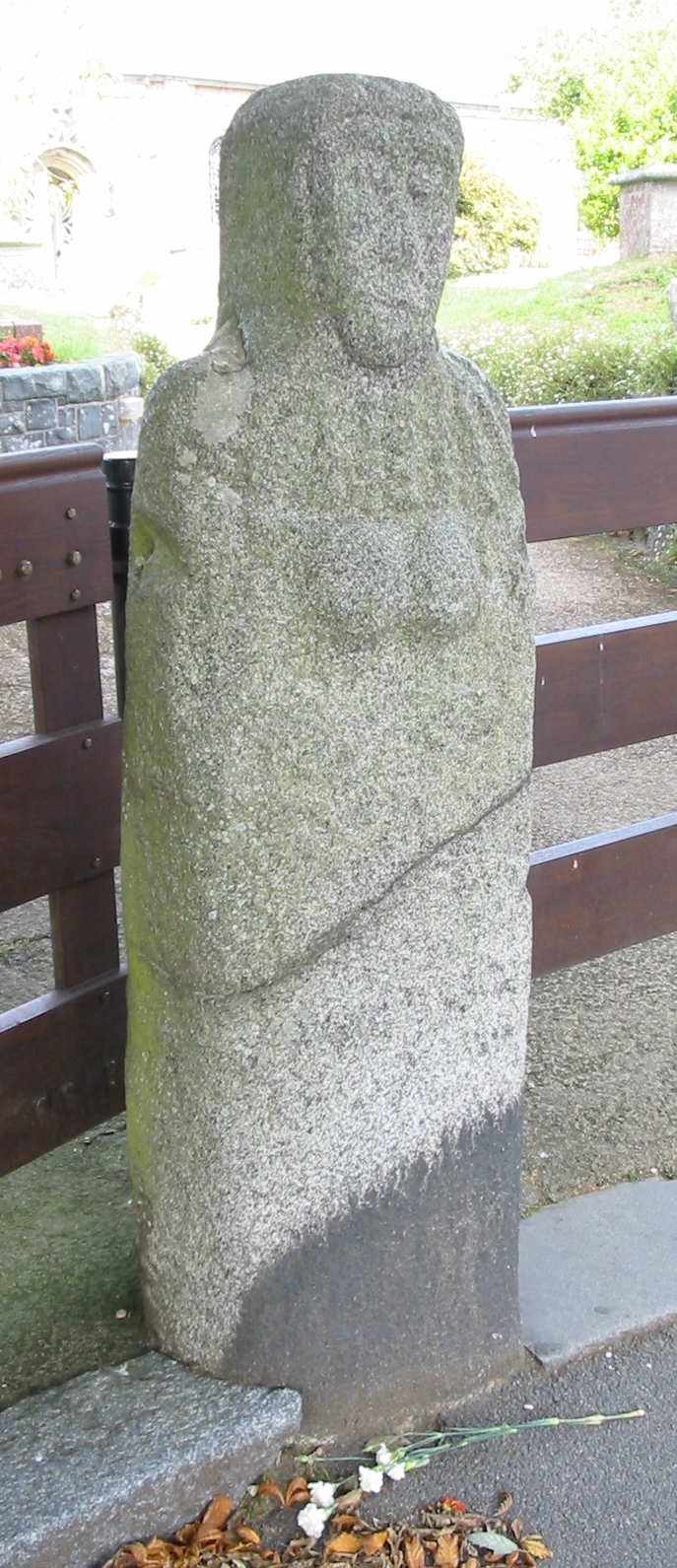
La Gran'mère du Chimquière, Guernsey

- Castel Menhir standing stone 2 m high depicting a female figure, discovered under the steps of the Castel church in 1878.
- Déhus Dolmen, prehistoric passage grave first excavated in 1837, which yielded quantities of finds. There is also a human figure carved under a capstone.
- Le Trepied Dolmen, Le Catioroc, a passage grave that yielded iron swords and scabbards, shield boss, knife, urn and spearheads.
- La Gran'mère du Chimquière, standing stone menhir shaped into a female figure, the head being recarved, possibly in Roman times, located at St Martin’s church.
- La Platte Mare a cist in circle, located on L'Ancresse common. Axes and arrow heads discovered.

==== Alderney, Sark, Herm and Jethou ====
Alderney has a cist, or burial chamber named Roc à l’Epine dating from 4,000 BC. On Sark, there is a terraced area that dates from the late Stone Age (c.2,400 BC). Herm contains at least eight known visible tombs with another seven suspected. Jethou has a menhir.

=== Bronze Age ===
1,800 BC –1,100 BC

- Le Pinacle, a natural rock formation in Jersey has two earth and rubble ramparts. In Roman times the site held a rectangular Gallo-Roman temple. Amongst the large number of finds from various excavations are flints, hammers, rubbers, polishing stones, a copper arrow head, bronze spear head, wheel turned pottery and a Roman coin.
- Trinity Hoard, Jersey. 23 bronze axeheads, found inside a pottery container in 2012.
- Sark Mill digs run by Sir Barry Cunliffe revealed spindle whorls and amber beads indicating sheep were reared on the island in this period.

=== Iron Age ===
1,100 BC-500 AD

Celtic tribes of South England

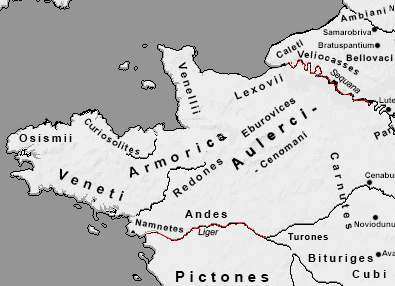
Map of the Gallic people in Western Gaul. Baiocasses between Lexovii and Unelli are not mentioned

- Longy Hoard, Alderney, discovered in 1832. 200 bronze items (dating from around 800 BC), including axes, spear heads, sickles, chisels and bronze scraps
- La Motte, Jersey is a small island. A cairn and a number of middens, dating from 1,500 BC to 300 BC have been uncovered.
- Le Câtel de Rozel with its 6 m high bank extending 200 m is the largest Iron Age fort in Jersey.
- Hoards dating from 1st century B.C. found in Jersey:
  - La Marquanderie Hoard, Jersey. 10,547 Armorican coins, almost all issued by the Curiosolitae.
  - Le Câtillon Hoard found in 1957 of over 2,500 Celtic coins representing tribes in Armorica and Gaul as well as in Southern Britain. Tribes include Coriosolites, Osismii, Aulerci, Baiocasses, Durotriges, Redones, Unelli (or Venelli), Veneti, Ambiani, Bituriges Cubi and Volcae Arecomici.
  - Rozel Hoard (1820)
  - Rozel Hoard (1875)
- Sark Hoard, found in 1719, of horse silver and coins from the 1st century BC.
- Jersey finds include an Iron Age house in St Clement, elsewhere quern stones, glass beads, briquetage used in salt making and pottery have been found.
- Midden analysis of soil, food remains and pottery on Jethou excavations indicate activity between 380 and 160 BC. There is also evidence of salt manufacture on the island.
- Pottery from about 500 BC was discovered in 1968 in Alderney.

==== Gallo-Roman period ====
50 BC – 450 AD

The Roman name for the Channel Islands was I. Lenuri (Lenur Islands) and is included in the Peutinger Table

- Grouville Hoard, Jersey. 70,000 late Iron Age and Roman coins. The hoard is thought to have belonged to a member of the Curiosolitae tribe fleeing Julius Caesar's armies around 50 to 60 BC.
- ‘’Asterix’’ shipwreck, Saint Peter Port Harbour, Guernsey. It is thought to be a Roman cargo vessel and was probably at anchor or grounded when the fire broke out around 280 AD. The wreck, discovered in 1982 has been raised, coins, pots, cordage, barrels and a bronze bilge pump was found, the preserved timbers are on display next to the Fort Grey Shipwreck Museum.
- Alderney Nunnery – 4th century fort, 30 m x 30 m square with rounded corners where towers were built. Built of stone and Roman concrete. Possibly a signal station linked to protection of trade.
- La Plaiderie, St Peter Port, Guernsey where excavations uncovered remains of a trading place with stone warehouse type structures from the Roman period. Amongst the finds were moulds for counterfeiting coins.
- Little evidence has emerged of Roman period houses. Roof tiles have been found in Grouville church cellar and in the Castel church walls in Guernsey. In King’s Road, Guernsey, excavations of burials uncovered various items of jewelry and a complete Samian bowl.
- Roman pottery and evidence of glass and metal working have emerged from excavations in Guernsey at the Bonded Stores dig and at La Plaiderie, giving evidence of a thriving maritime economy. Finds of trade goods have been uncovered on most of the Channel Islands, including amphora on the Écréhous.

=== Early Middle Ages ===
450 AD to 1000 AD

- The first churches and chapels constructed were probably of timber or loose stone construction. On Jethou a small trapezoidal building with internal dimensions of 4.8 m by 2 m has been excavated which was possibly an ecclesiastical structure dating from 675 AD ± 190 years.
- On Herm a building, thought to be linked to St Tugual who died in 564 AD or his followers, is incorporated into the later 12th-century building.
- In the Fishermen's Chapel, Jersey, a more solid structure was created, the builders used limpet shells crushed and dissolved with boiling sea-water to make liquid lime-mortar which was poured into the wall-work.
- A chapel built around 911, now forms part of the nave of the Parish Church of St Clement, Jersey.
- On the Île Agois a 76 m high rock stack north of Jersey remains of 25 hut structures were found containing 7th or 8th century objects including a socketed axe and glass beads.

=== High Middle Ages ===
1000 AD - 1300 AD

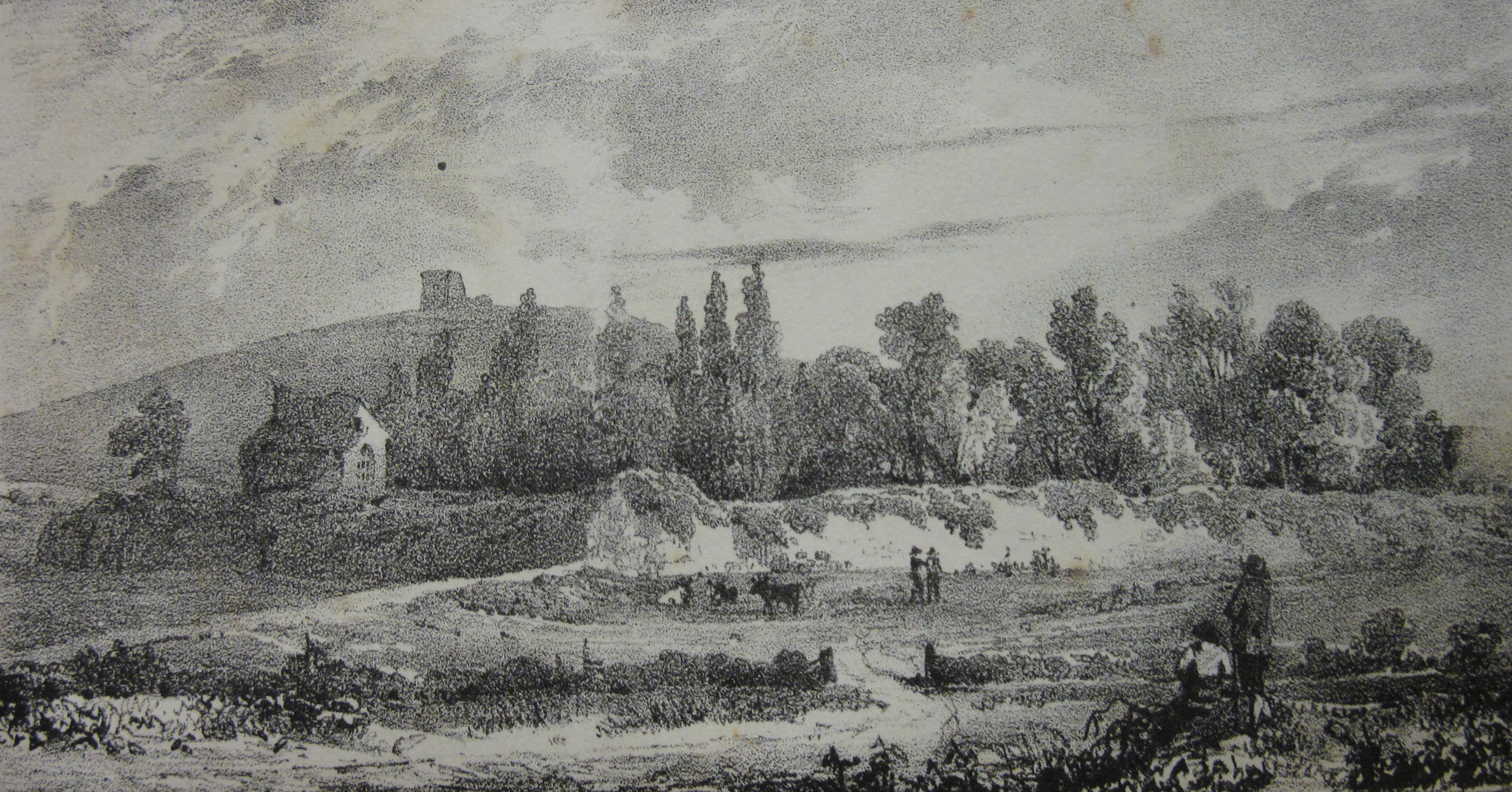
Ivy Castle (1826), Guernsey

The wealth of the Dukes of Normandy and the Norman church is demonstrated in the number of building works. There are also a number of surviving written documents dating from this period.

- Construction of fortifications
  - Mont Orgueil, Jersey
  - Castle Cornet, Guernsey
  - Chateau des Marais, Guernsey (Ivy Castle)
- Construction of many religious buildings, often to replace older smaller chapels, including:
  - St Brelade's Church, Jersey. Chapel was pre 1035
  - Parish Church of St Clement, Jersey.
  - Parish Church of St Helier, Jersey, extended in 12th Century
  - The Vale Church, Guernsey
  - Priory of Notre Dame de Lihou
- Old Street, Jersey, excavation in 1979 revealed remains of a 13th-century house, 6 m x 10 m.

=== Late Middle Ages ===
1300 AD to 1500 AD

- Written archaeological evidence increases in this period, with for instance Assize Rolls from 1303, 1306 and 1338. An eyewitness account to a battle in Jersey in 1406 exists.
- Grosnez Castle, Jersey. Built around 1330, dismantled 150 years later.
- Albecq Medieval Settlement, Guernsey, comprising stone buildings, where pottery and 18 silver coins dating from pre 1375 were discovered.
- Chapel of St Apolline, Guernsey with 14th-century frescoes.

=== Early modern period ===
1500 AD – 1750 AD

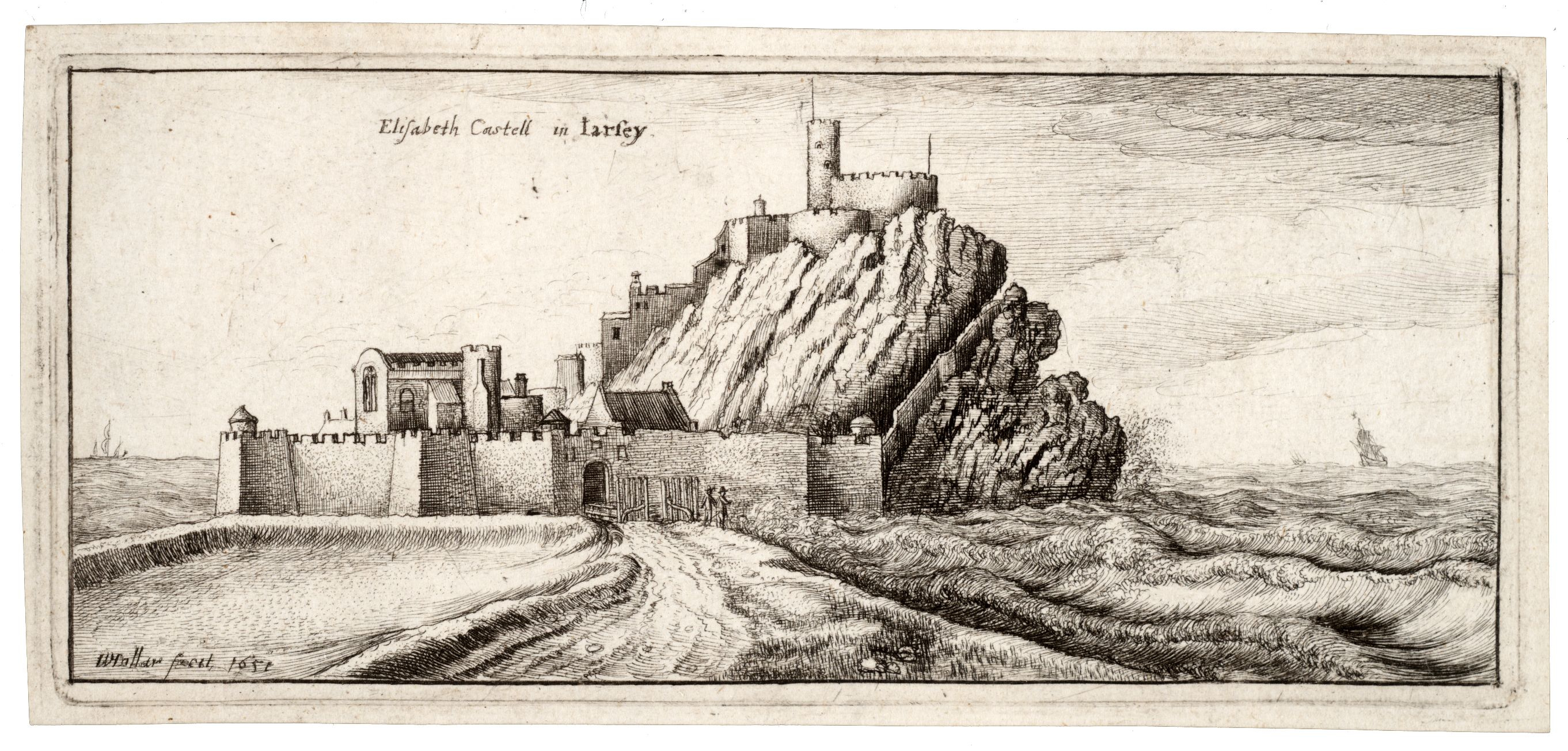
A 1651 depiction of Elizabeth Castle

- Surviving church records of birth marriage and deaths in the islands start in the 16th century.
- Essex Castle built in Alderney. Work started 1546.
- The 1588 Alderney Elizabethan Wreck.
- Elizabeth Castle, Jersey started in 1594.
- There are many houses in the islands dating from this period.

=== Late modern period ===
1750 AD to 2000 AD

- The William Gardner's Map of Guernsey (1787) and the James Cochrane's Map of Guernsey produced in 1832 shows every house on the island. Previous maps tended to only show main roads and navigation marks such as fortifications, windmills and churches.
- Many defensive works were created in the 1750-1815 era because of the threat of invasion from France. Conway's towers in Jersey and Guernsey loophole towers were followed with signal stations, gun batteries, magazines and Martello towers. Most of these structures still exist and are protected.
- Victorian fortifications and a breakwater in Alderney were built between 1850 and 1870.
- Lager Sylt labour camp and Lager Norderney in Alderney dating from 1942 have been searched with ground radar and to recover any deteriorating archaeological evidence.
- The excavating and preserving of material and the restoration of a number of World War II military structures in Jersey and Guernsey have been undertaken by the Channel Islands Occupation Society and Festung Guernsey which include:
  - Battery Lothringen, Jersey
  - Battery Moltke, Jersey
  - Sechsschartenturm Heavy MG bunker, Jersey
  - Fort Hommet Casement, Guernsey
- Archives of documents are now maintained in all the islands by their governments.
- Both Jersey and Guernsey are producing 3D digital maps of their islands.

== Museums ==
=== Jersey ===
- Jersey Museum and Art Gallery
- Jersey Archive
- La Hougue Bie
- Maritime Museum
- Mont Orgueil

=== Guernsey ===
- Guernsey Museum at Candie
- Fort Grey
- Castle Cornet
- Guernsey Occupation Museum
- Island Archives

=== Alderney ===
- Alderney Society Museum

=== Sark ===
- Occupation Museum
