= La Hougue Bie =

UK historical site

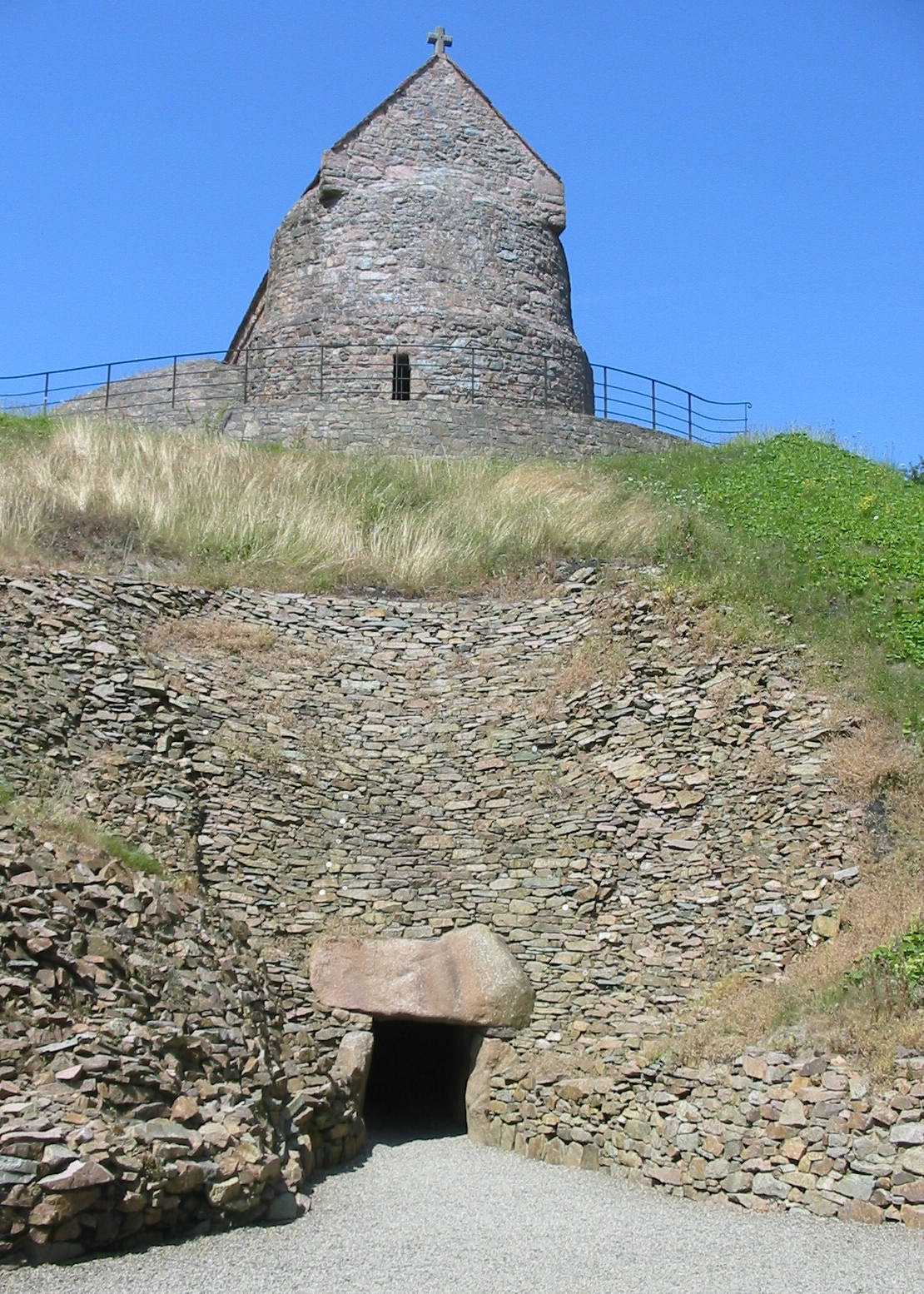
- Coordinates: 49.2006°N 2.0638°W
- Public transit access: Bus route 13
- Parking: On site (no charge)
- Website: www.jerseyheritage.org/places-to-visit/la-hougue-bie-museum

La Hougue Bie is a historic site, with museum, in the Jersey parish of Grouville. La Hougue Bie is depicted on the 2010 issue Jersey 1 pound note.

== Toponymy ==
Hougue is a Jèrriais/Cotentin variant form of the more common Norman form Hogue. It means "heap", "how", "mound" and comes from the Old Norse word haugr meaning about the same thing. Bie is of uncertain origin. The legend of La Hougue Bie connects it with the Seigneur of Hambye in the Cotentin; an Old Norse origin may connect it to -by toponyms in Great Britain; or it may be connected to the Jèrriais word bié (variant spelling for biz "leat"). There are several hamlets called La Bie in Normandy (Ex La Bie, or La By(e), Grumesnil), that is never confused with Le Bié (Ex: Le Vieux-Bié, Les planters du Viez Bié, 1263, Gournay-en-Bray). La Hougue Bie refers probably to "a building on the earth mound".

== Passage grave ==
The site consists of an 20.4 metre long passage chamber covered by a 12.2 metre high earth mound. The site was first excavated in 1925 by the Société Jersiaise. Fragments of twenty vase supports were found along with the scattered remains of at least eight individuals. Gravegoods, mostly pottery, were also present. At some time in the past, the site had evidently been entered and ransacked. On top of the mound were built two Medieval chapels. The Channel Islands have five passage graves with side chambers (La Hougue Bie, La Pouquelaye de Faldouet and Grantez in Jersey, La Varde and Le Déhus in Guernsey).

La Hougue Bie is a Neolithic ritual site which was in use around 4000-3500 BC. In Western Europe, it is one of the largest and best preserved passage graves and the most impressive and best preserved monument of Armorican Passage Grave group. Although they are termed "passage graves", they were ceremonial sites, whose function was more similar to churches or cathedrals, where burials were incidental. Since the excavations and restoration of the original entrance of the passage observations from inside the tomb at sunrise on the March equinox (spring equinox) and the September equinox (autumn equinox) have revealed that the orientation of the passage, probably fortuitously, allows the sun's rays to shine through to the chamber entering the back recess of the terminal cell. Although many passage graves showed evidence of continued activity into the Late Neolithic period, La Hougue Bie was abandoned before that time.

== Chapels and Prince's Tower ==
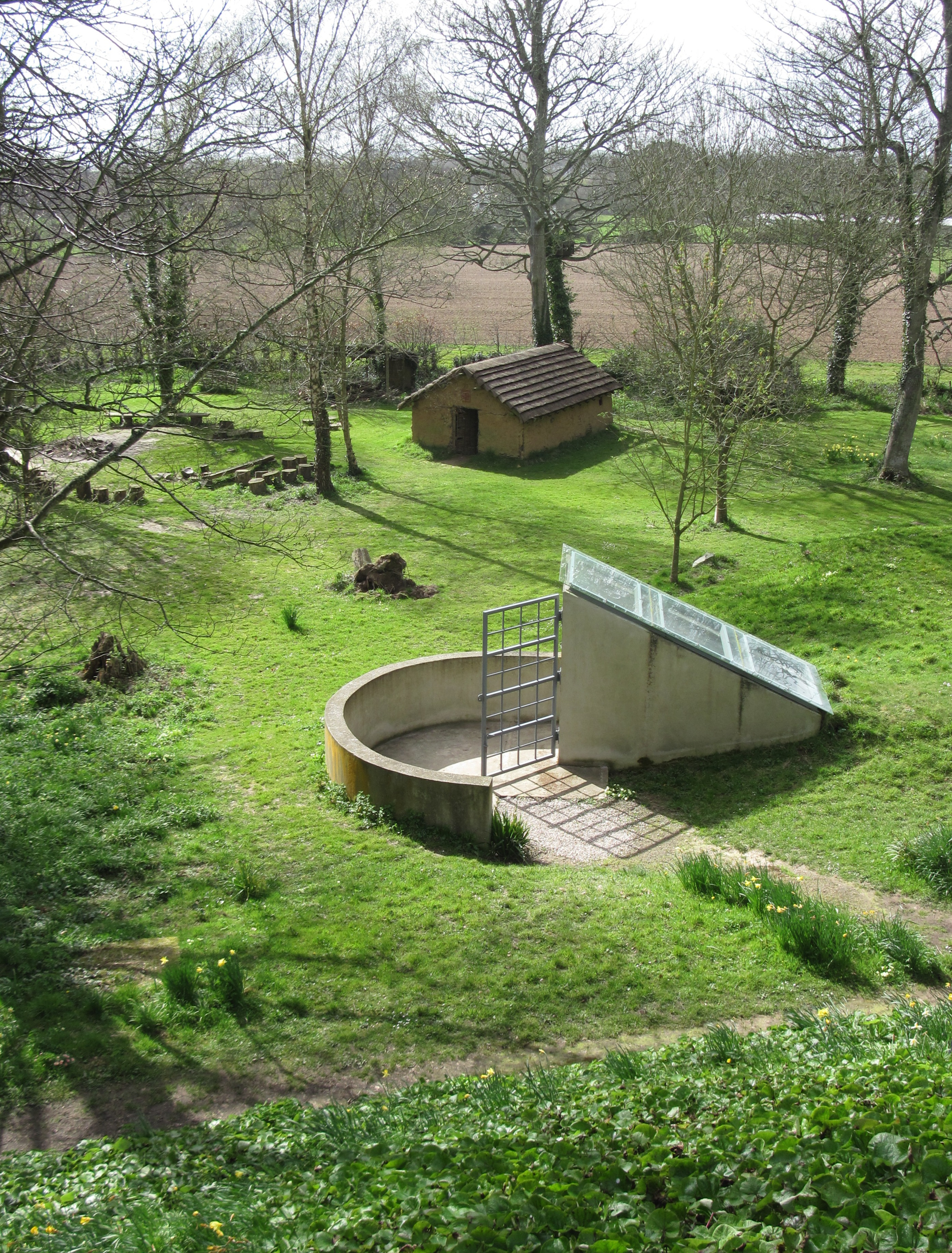
The entrance to the bunker can be seen in the foreground

Atop the mound are two medieval chapels, one from the 12th Century and the other from the 16th Century. This building complex has been altered a great deal through its history – including being engulfed for a period by the Prince’s Tower. Construction of this tower was started in 1792 by Philippe d'Auvergne, who justified the work by erecting a signal station on the tower as the hub of an island-wide communication system. The building was demolished in 1924.

== Second World War ==
During the Second World War, it was used as a key lookout point, and an underground command bunker was built in the mound and the adjacent area. This structure is open to the public, and houses an exhibition commemorating the workers from across Europe forced to build defences in Jersey during the German occupation.

== Museum ==
The site, which is managed by Jersey Heritage, also houses the island's brand new archeology exhibit about the Grouville Hoard – Unearthing Le Câtillon II – the world's largest Celtic coin hoard. Visitors can explore what might have led people to bury a hoard of 70,000 coins and jewellery in Jersey 2,000 years ago.

== Notable people ==
- Arthur Mourant (1904–1994), haematologist, born in La Hougue Bie

== See also ==
- Archaeology of the Channel Islands
- Jersey Dolmens
- Tumulus
