= Jersey Heritage =

Jersey independent trust

Coordinates: 49.1824°N 2.1072°W

- Founded: 1983
- Purpose: Heritage
- Location: St Helier, Jersey
- Key people: Jonathan Carter (Director); Philip Thomas (Finance Director)
- Website: www.jerseyheritage.org

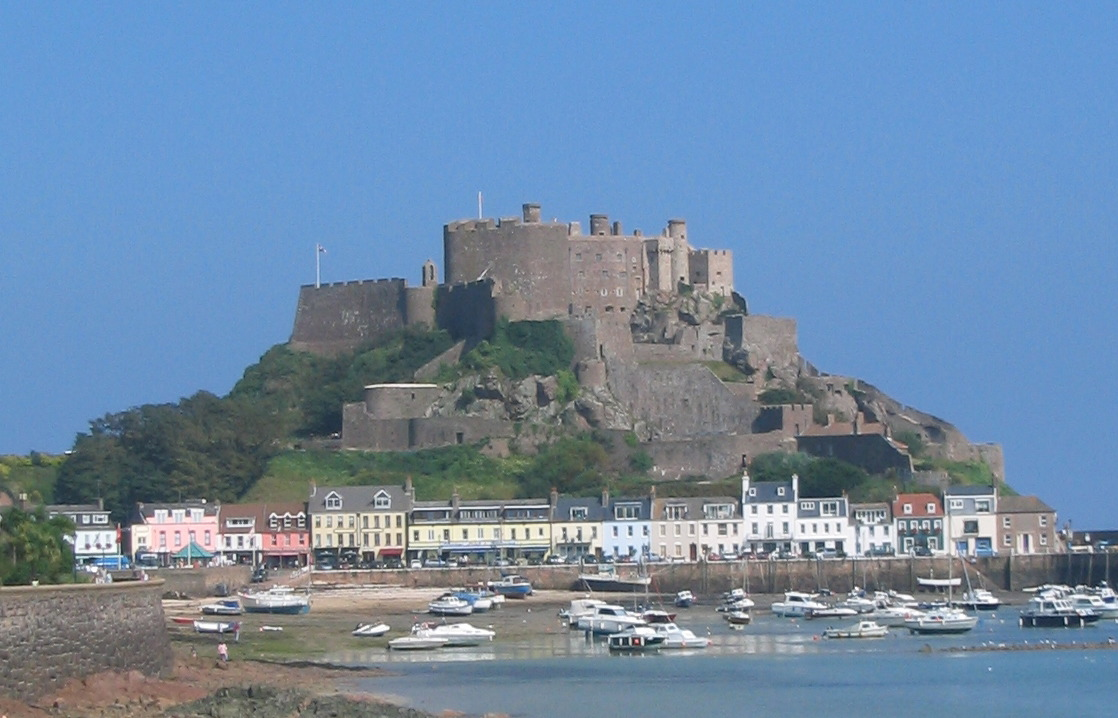
Mont Orgueil Castle

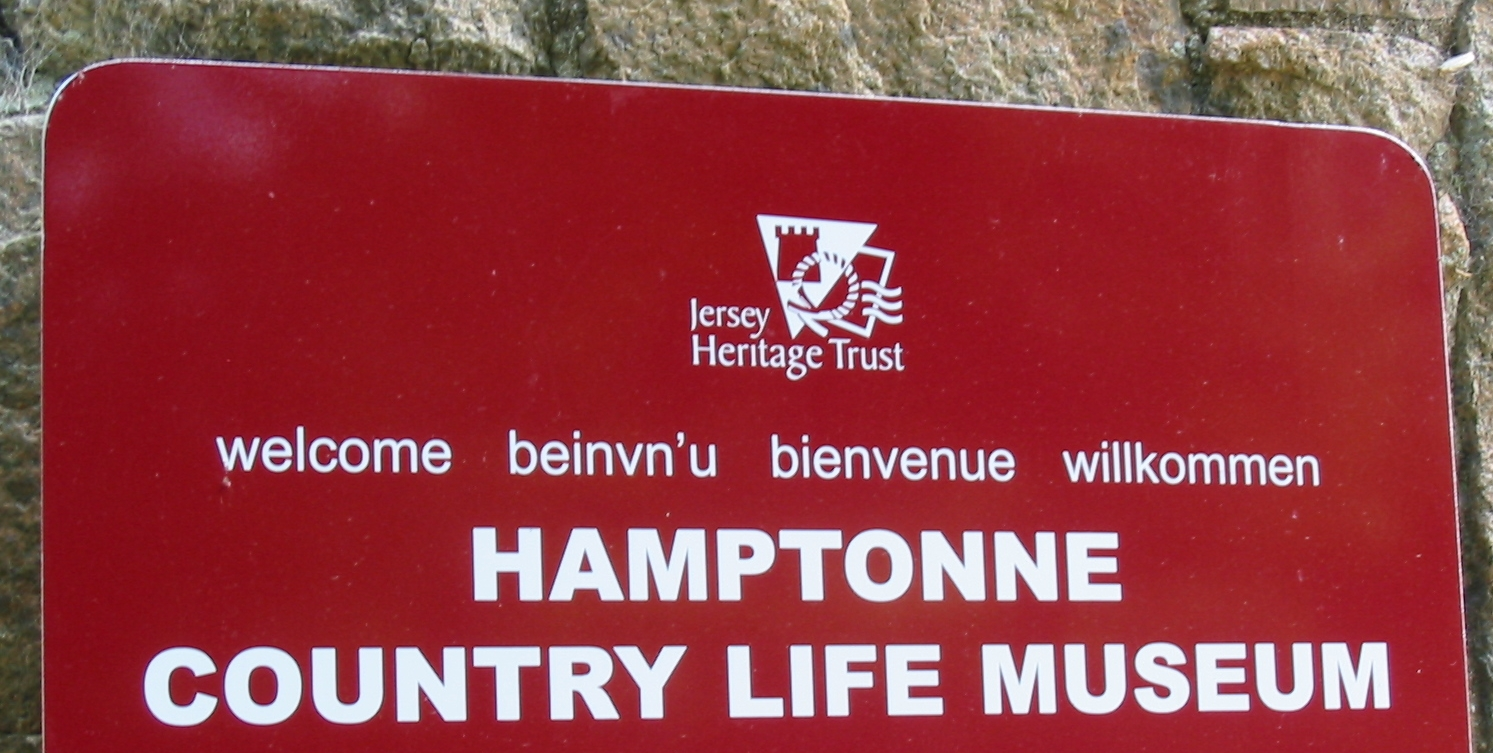
Jersey Heritage Trust welcome sign at Hamptonne

Jersey Heritage is an independent trust in Jersey which is responsible for the island's major historic sites, museums, and public archives. It holds collections of artefacts, works of art, documents, specimens, and information relating to Jersey's history, culture, and environment.

The trust was formally registered in Jersey on 3 June 1983.

The trust is financed by an annual grant from the States of Jersey, and self-generated income.

== Properties managed ==
=== Jersey Museum and Art Gallery ===
The Jersey Museum and Art Gallery is located at Weighbridge Place, in St Helier.

=== Jersey Archive ===
The Jersey Archive, established in 1993, is located in a building on Clarence Road, in St Helier.

It has the responsibility of cataloging and storing historical documents and works of art, and to make archived items available to the public. This includes the initial examination of the Grouville Hoard, found in 2012.

The research staff at the facility will assist anyone with local research on subjects such as family history, the history of buildings, and the occupation of the Channel Islands.

=== Other properties managed ===
- Jersey Maritime Museum, New North Quay, St Helier
- Occupation Tapestry Gallery at the Maritime Museum
- Mont Orgueil Castle, Gorey
- Elizabeth Castle, St Helier
- Hamptonne Country Life Museum
- La Hougue Bie
- Seymour Tower
- La Rocco tower
- Fisherman's Cottage, St Helier
- Marine Peilstand 2, also known as Radio Tower
- La Crête Fort
- La Tour Cârrée
- L’Etacquerel Fort
- Fort Leicester, 19th century fort
- Lewis Tower
- Kempt Tower
- Archirondel Tower
- Barge Aground, seaside folly built in the 1930s

== See also ==
- Guernsey Society
- Jersey Society in London
- Société Jersiaise
