= List of current members of the States Assembly =

This article lists the members of the 2022–2026 States Assembly until the members elected at the 2026 Jersey general election are sworn in.

States Assembly composition by affiliation Voting members Reform Jersey Better Way Advance Jersey Independent Non-voting members Bailiff Lieutenant Governor Dean Attorney General Solicitor General

The States Assembly consists of 54 members;

- 12 connétables, 1 from each of the islands' parishes
- 37 deputies, elected from 9 variously sized multi-member constituencies
- 5 non-voting members chosen by appointment

== Party affiliation ==
Of the 49 voting members;

Affiliation	Connétables	Deputies	Total
Reform Jersey	0	10	10
Better Way	0	4	4
Advance Jersey	0	2	2
Independent	12	21	33
Total	12	37	49

== List of connétables ==
As of June 2026, before the swearing-in of members elected at the 2026 general election:

Parish	Portrait	Member	Party	Assumed office	Majority at last election	Previous office(s)
Grouville		Mark Labey	Independent	2022	72	—
St Brelade		Mike Jackson	Independent	2018	1,451	Connétable of St Brelade (2005–2011)
St Clement		Marcus Troy	Independent	2021	1,748	—
St Helier		Simon Crowcroft	Independent	2001	944	Deputy of St Helier No. 2 (1996–2001)
St John		Andy Jehan	Independent	2021	1,036	—
St Lawrence		Deidre Mezbourian	Independent	2008	301	Deputy of St Lawrence (2005–2008)
St Martin		Karen Shenton-Stone	Independent	2018	1,057	
St Mary		David Johnson	Independent	2018	83	—
St Ouen		Richard Honeycombe	Independent	2022	512	—
St Peter		Richard Vibert	Independent	2018	872	—
St Saviour		Kevin Lewis	Independent	2022	396	Deputy of St Saviour No. 2 (2005–2022)
Trinity		Philip Le Suer	Independent (Note: Elected as a member of Jersey Alliance in the 2022 general election, but resigned from the party a month later.)	2014	441	—

== List of deputies ==
As of June 2026, before the swearing-in of members elected at the 2026 general election:

Constituency	Portrait	Member	Party	Assumed office	Majority at last election	Previous office(s)
St Helier South		Sam Mézec	Reform Jersey	2022	364	Deputy of St Helier No. 2 (2014–2018); Senator (2018–2022)
St Helier South		Tom Coles	Reform Jersey	2022	122	—
St Helier South		Beatriz Porée	Reform Jersey	2022	88	—
St Helier South		David Warr	Better Way (Note: Better Way is a group of independent politicians who pledge to work together, and is not registered as a political party.)	2022	25	—
St Helier Central		Carina Alves	Reform Jersey	2022	437	Deputy of St Helier No. 2 (2018–2022)
St Helier Central		Robert Ward	Reform Jersey	2022	413	Deputy of St Helier No. 2 (2018–2022)
St Helier Central		Lyndsay Feltham	Reform Jersey	2022	343	—
St Helier Central		Catherine Curtis	Reform Jersey	2022	323	—
St Helier Central		Geoff Southern	Reform Jersey	2022	210	Deputy of St Helier No. 2 (2002–2022)
St Helier North		Inna Gardiner	Independent	2022	928	Deputy of St Helier No. 3&4 (2019–2022)
St Helier North		Mary Le Hegarat	Independent	2022	531	Deputy of St Helier No. 3&4 (2018–2022)
St Helier North		Max Andrews	Independent	2022	399	—
St Helier North		Steve Ahier	Independent	2022	262	Deputy of St Helier No. 3&4 (2018–2022)
St Saviour		Tom Binet	Independent	2022	595	—
St Saviour		Malcolm Ferey	Advance Jersey	2022	374	—
St Saviour		Louise Doublet	Independent	2022	326	Deputy of St Saviour No. 2 (2014–2022)
St Saviour		Raluca Kovacs	Reform Jersey	2022	86	—
St Saviour		Philip Ozouf	Independent	2022	54	Deputy of St Helier No. 3 (1996–2002); Senator (2002–2022)
St Clement		Alex Curtis	Better Way	2022	556	—
St Clement		Barbara Ward	Independent	2022	486	—
St Clement		Philip Bailhache	Advance Jersey	2022	322	Deputy of Grouville (1972–1975); Solicitor General (1975–1986); Attorney General (1986–1994); Deputy Bailiff (1994–1995); Bailiff (1995–2009); Senator (2011–2018)
St Clement		Karen Wilson	Independent	2022	50	—
St Brelade		Helen Miles	Independent	2022	1,042	—
St Brelade		Moz Scott	Independent	2022	455	—
St Brelade		Jonathan Renouf	Independent	2022	454	—
St Brelade		Montfort Tadier	Reform Jersey	2022	175	Deputy of St Brelade No. 2 (2008–2022)
St Mary, St Ouen, and St Peter		Kristina Moore	Better Way	2022	1,677	Deputy of St Peter (2011–2018); Senator (2018–2022)
St Mary, St Ouen, and St Peter		Lucy Stephenson	Better Way	2022	1,186	—
St Mary, St Ouen, and St Peter		Ian Gorst	Independent	2022	1,155	Deputy of St Clement (2005–2011); Senator (2011–2022)
St Mary, St Ouen, and St Peter		Lyndon Farnham	Independent	2022	48	Deputy of St Saviour No. 2 (1999–2005); Senator (2011–2022)
St John, St Lawrence, and Trinity		Kirsten Morel	Independent	2022	1,522	Deputy of St Lawrence (2018–2022)
St John, St Lawrence, and Trinity		Hilary Jeune	Independent	2022	1,435	—
St John, St Lawrence, and Trinity		Elaine Millar	Independent	2022	1,075	—
St John, St Lawrence, and Trinity		Andy Howell	Independent	2022	556	—
Grouville and St Martin		Carolyn Labey	Independent	2022	674	Deputy of Grouville (2002–2022)
Grouville and St Martin		Steve Luce	Independent (Note: Elected as a member of the Progress Party, became an independent when the party disbanded in July 2023.)	2022	309	Deputy of St Martin (2011–2022)
Grouville and St Martin		Rose Binet	Independent	2022	174	—

== List of non-voting members ==
As of June 2026:

Office	Portrait	Member	Assumed office	Previous office(s)
Bailiff		Robert MacRae	2025	Attorney General (2015–2020); Deputy Bailiff (2020–2025)
Lieutenant Governor		Jerry Kyd	2022	Commander United Kingdom Carrier Strike Group (2015–2016); Captain of HMS Queen Elizabeth (2016–2018); Commander United Kingdom Maritime Forces and Rear Admiral Surface Ships (2018–2019); Fleet commander of the Royal Navy (2019–2022)
Dean		Mike Keirle	2017	Vice-Dean of Guernsey (2013–2017)
Attorney General		Matthew Jowitt	2026	Solicitor General (2020–2026)
Solicitor General		Vacant		—
