= People First Party (Jersey) =

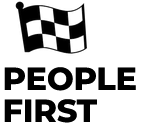
- Chairperson: Nick Le Cornu
- Founded: April 2026
- Colours: Black
- States Assembly: 0 / 49

Website
- peoplefirstparty.je

The People First Party is a political party in the Crown Dependency of Jersey founded by Nick Le Cornu in 2026.

== History ==
Nick Le Cornu was one of the founding members of the largest political party on the island, Reform Jersey, and along with deputy Sam Mezec transformed it from a pressure group into a political party.

In the 2014 Jersey by-elections, Le Cornu won the St Helier No. 1 seat.

Later in the year, Le Cornu was forced to resign from the party over sexist comments made about a female candidate for the upcoming general elections on his Twitter account. Le Cornu was not re-elected in 2014.

Le Cornu ran as a candidate in the subsequent 2018 and 2022 elections.

In April 2026, Le Cornu launched the People First Party. Its manifesto included committing to a £15 minimum wage, reforming the bureaucracy and combatting discrimination. The party will present two candidates in the 2026 Jersey general election, Nick Le Cornu and trade unionist Andy Sinclair. The pair are standing in the St Helier South constituency.

== Election results ==
States Assembly
Election	Leader	Votes		Seats			Position	Government
Election	Leader	No.	Share	No.	±	Share	Position	Government
2026	Nick Le Cornu	TBD	TBD	0 / 49	Steady		Steady	TBD

== See also ==
- Political parties in Jersey
- Politics of Jersey
- Constitution of Jersey
