= 2018 Jersey general election =

Election in British Crown Dependency

- 16 May 2018

All 49 seats in the States Assembly 25 seats needed for a majority
- Registered: 62,123
- Turnout: 43.4% (▲3.5 pp) (Note: Based on results for senators.)
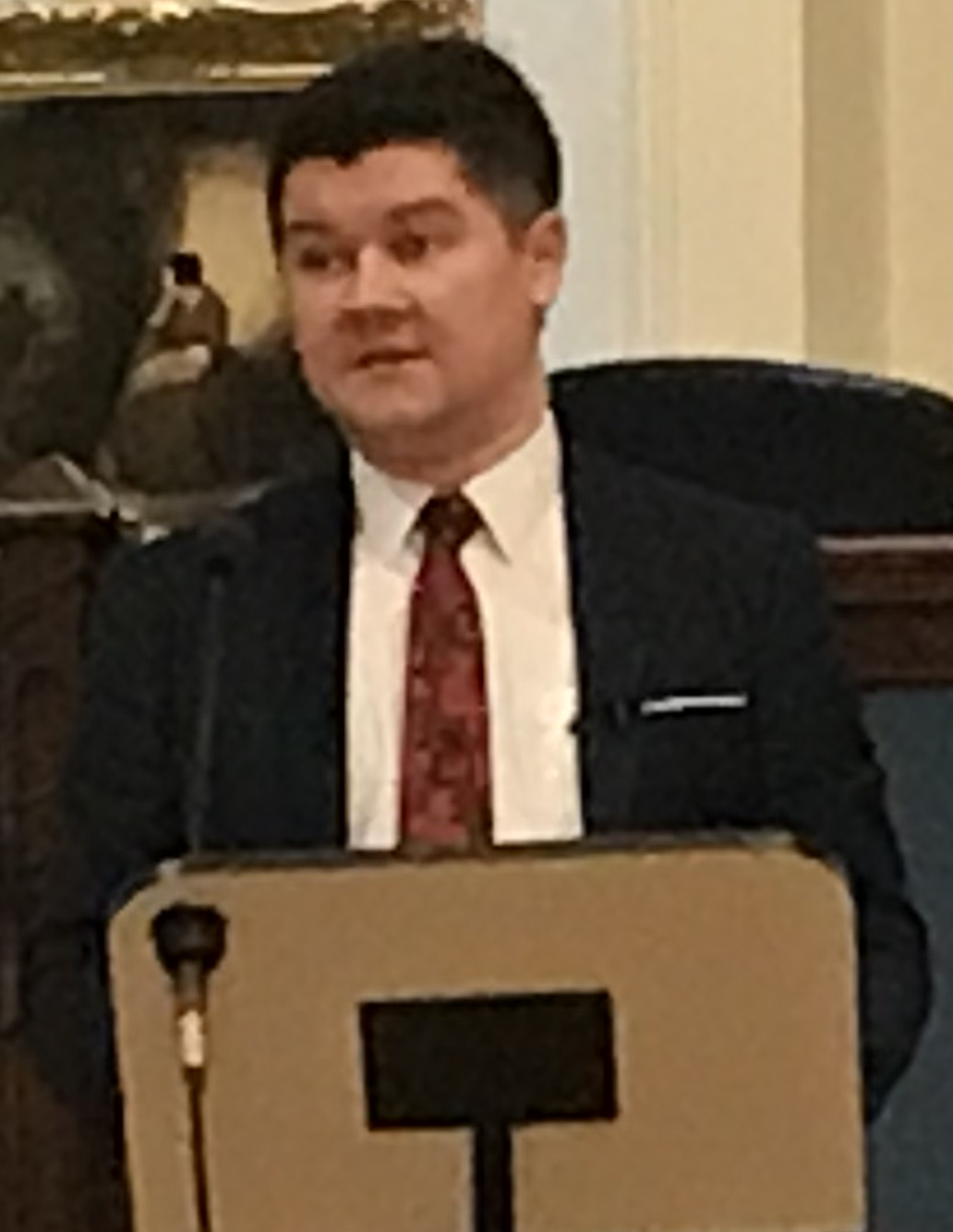
	First party	Second party
		IND
Leader	Sam Mézec	—
Party	Reform Jersey	Independents
Leader's seat	Senator	—
Last election	3	46
Seats won	5 / 49	44 / 49
Seat change	▲2	▼2
Popular vote	19,984	173,751
Percentage	10.3%	89.6%
Chief Minister before election
Ian Gorst
Independent
Chief Minister after election
John Le Fondré
Independent

General elections were held in Jersey on 16 May 2018 to elect the 49 members of the States Assembly.

== Electoral system ==
At the time of the election, the 49 members of the States consisted of three different types of members. The 29 Deputies were elected from 18 districts; nine districts elected one deputy, five districts elected two deputies, two districts elected three deputies, and two districts elected four deputies, with voters able to cast as many votes as there were seats in their district. The 12 Constables were elected from each of the 12 parishes, although only one didn't get elected unopposed, whilst the eight Senators are elected on an island-wide basis, with each voter casting up to eight votes.

== Results ==
=== Results for Senators ===
The results for the election of Senators were as follows:

Candidate name (8 candidates with highest votes elected)	Votes	Percentage	Notes
Tracey Vallois	15518	57.6%	Highest vote share
Kristina Moore	15292	56.7%	
John Le Fondré	14214	52.7%	Became Chief Minister of Jersey after election in the States Assembly
Lyndon Farnham	12417	46%	
Steve Pallett	12114	44.9%	
Ian Gorst	12068	44.8%	
Sarah Ferguson	11297	41.9%	
Sam Mézec	11007	40.8%	Only senatorial candidate from Reform Jersey
Moz Scott	10884	40.4%	
Anthony Lewis	10709	39.7%	
Simon Brée	10529	39.1%	
Gerard Baudins	6341	23.5%	
Gordon George Troy	4695	17.4%	
Frank Luce	2279	8.4%	
Gino Risoli	1401	5.2%	
Phil Maguire	976	3.6%	
Stevie Ocean	953	3.5%	
Total	26947	100%	

=== Results for Connétables ===
The results for the election of connétables were as follows:

==== St Brelade ====
Mike Jackson was elected unopposed.

==== St Clement ====
Len Norman was elected unopposed.

==== Grouville ====
John Le Maistre was elected unopposed.

==== St Helier ====
Simon Crowcroft was elected unopposed.

==== St John ====
Christopher Taylor was elected unopposed.

==== St Lawrence ====
Deidre Mezbourian was elected unopposed.

==== St Martin ====
Karen Shenton-Stone was elected unopposed.

==== St Mary ====
Party	Candidate	Votes	%	±%
Independent	John Le Bailly	423	51.5	
Independent	Juliette Gallichan	398	48.5	
Turnout		821	60.8	

==== St Ouen ====
Richard Buchanan was elected unopposed.

==== St Peter ====
Richard Vibert was elected unopposed.

==== St Saviour ====
Sadie Rennard was elected unopposed.

==== Trinity ====
Philip Le Sueur was elected unopposed.

=== Results for deputies ===
The results for the election of deputies were as follows:

==== Grouville ====
Carolyn Labey was elected unopposed.

==== St Brelade No. 1 ====
John Young was elected unopposed.

==== St Brelade No. 2 ====
Party	Candidate	Votes	%	±%
Independent	Graham Truscott	1,506	34.9	
Reform Jersey	Montfort Tadier	1,193	27.7	
Independent	Tony Pike	1,146	26.6	
Reform Jersey	Garel Tucker	454	10.5	
Rejected ballots		12	0.3	
Total votes		4,311	100	—
Turnout		2,437	46.4	

==== St Clement ====
Party	Candidate	Votes	%	±%
Independent	Susie Pinel	1,499	31.4	
Independent	Lindsay Ash	1,286	26.9	
Reform Jersey	Cloe Freeman	798	16.7	
Reform Jersey	Samantha Morrison	596	12.5	
Independent	Philip Renouf	578	12.1	
Rejected ballots		24	0.5	
Total votes		4,781	100	—
Turnout		2,677	44.4	

==== St Helier No. 1 ====
Party	Candidate	Votes	%	±%
Independent	Judy Martin	871	20.5	
Independent	Russell Labey	833	19.6	
Independent	Scott Wickenden	682	16.1	
Reform Jersey	Kelly Langdon	441	10.4	
Reform Jersey	John McNichol	435	10.3	
Independent	Nick Le Cornu	364	8.6	
Reform Jersey	Yann Mash	314	7.4	
Independent	Jason Lagadu	274	6.5	
Rejected ballots		27	0.6	
Total votes		4,241	100	—
Turnout		1,683	33.5	

==== St Helier No. 2 ====
Party	Candidate	Votes	%	±%
Reform Jersey	Geoff Southern	629	17.3	
Reform Jersey	Robert Ward	612	16.9	
Reform Jersey	Carina Alves	605	16.7	
Independent	Linda Dodds	466	12.9	
Independent	Bernie Manning	456	12.6	
Independent	Geraint Jennings	428	11.8	
Independent	Barry Shelton	404	11.1	
Rejected ballots		26	0.7	
Total votes		3,626	100	—
Turnout		1,428	34.3	

==== St Helier No. 3&4 ====
Party	Candidate	Votes	%	±%
Independent	Richard Rondel	1,404	15.3	
Independent	Mike Higgins	1,190	13.0	
Independent	Mary Le Hegarat	1,173	12.8	
Independent	Steve Ahier	1,020	11.1	
Independent	Inna Gardiner	903	9.8	
Independent	Jaqui Carrrel	861	9.4	
Reform Jersey	Anne Southern	790	8.6	
Reform Jersey	Mary Ayling-Philip	706	7.7	
Reform Jersey	Julian Rogers	631	6.9	
Independent	Guy de Faye	477	5.2	
Rejected ballots		23	0.3	
Total votes		9,178	100	—
Turnout		2,856	35.2	

==== St John ====
Party	Candidate	Votes	%	±%
Independent	Trevor Pointon	609	52.6	
Independent	Nigel Philpott	537	46.4	
Rejected ballots		11	1.0	
Total votes		1,157	100	—
Turnout		1,157	50.3	

==== St Lawrence ====
Party	Candidate	Votes	%	±%
Independent	Kirsten Morel	1,499	50.0	
Independent	Gregory Guida	1,194	39.9	
Independent	Sarah Westwater	299	10.0	
Rejected ballots		4	0.1	
Total votes		2,996	100	—
Turnout		1,482	37.8	

==== St Martin ====
Steve Luce was elected unopposed.

==== St Mary ====
Party	Candidate	Votes	%	±%
Independent	David Johnson	495	60.7	
Independent	Mark Baker	309	37.9	
Rejected ballots		12	1.5	
Total votes		816	100	—
Turnout		816	60.4	

==== St Ouen ====
Party	Candidate	Votes	%	±%
Independent	Richard Renouf	1,338	85.2	
Independent	Cliff Le Clercq	218	13.9	
Rejected ballots		14	0.9	
Total votes		1,570	100	—
Turnout		1,570	53.3	

==== St Peter ====
Party	Candidate	Votes	%	±%
Independent	Rowland Huelin	991	63.5	
Independent	Sean Creavy	553	35.4	
Rejected ballots		17	1.1	
Total votes		1,561	100	—
Turnout		1,561	44.5	

==== St Saviour No. 1 ====
Party	Candidate	Votes	%	±%
Independent	Jeremy Maçon	793	38.9	
Independent	Kevin Pamplin	509	24.9	
Independent	Isabella Lewis	395	19.4	
Reform Jersey	Fiona O'Sullivan	339	16.6	
Rejected ballots		5	0.2	
Total votes		2,041	100	—
Turnout		1,153	39.1	

==== St Saviour No. 2 ====
Party	Candidate	Votes	%	±%
Independent	Louise Doublet	874	42.2	
Independent	Kevin Lewis	858	41.4	
Reform Jersey	Jaime Boylan	334	16.1	
Rejected ballots		4	0.2	
Total votes		2,070	100	—
Turnout		1,216	39.4	

==== St Saviour No. 3 ====
Party	Candidate	Votes	%	±%
Independent	Jess Perchard	528	49.3	
Independent	Mary O'Keefe	266	24.8	
Independent	Andrew Le Quesne	161	15.0	
Reform Jersey	Tom Coles	100	9.3	
Rejected ballots		17	1.6	
Total votes		1,072	100	—
Turnout		1,072	43.8	

==== Trinity ====
Party	Candidate	Votes	%	±%
Independent	Hugh Raymond	966	81.0	
Independent	David R.T. Richardson	210	17.6	
Rejected ballots		17	1.4	
Total votes		1,193	100	—
Turnout		1,193	54.8	

== See also ==
- Elections in Jersey
- Political parties in Jersey
- Politics of Jersey
- Constitution of Jersey
