= 2022 Jersey general election =

- 22 June 2022

All 49 seats in the States Assembly 25 seats needed for a majority
- Registered: 60,678
- Turnout: 41.6% (▼1.8 pp) (Note: Based on results for deputies.)
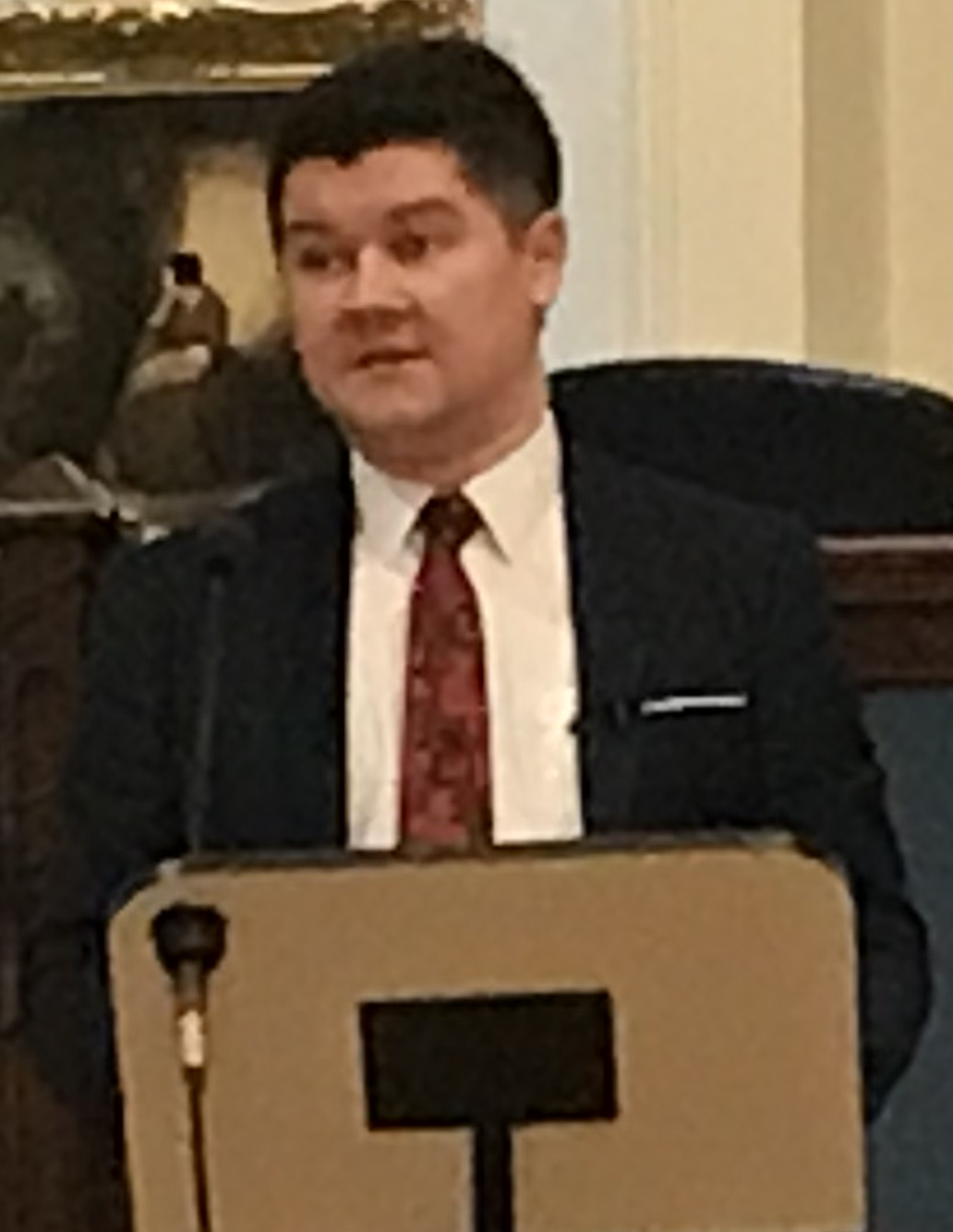

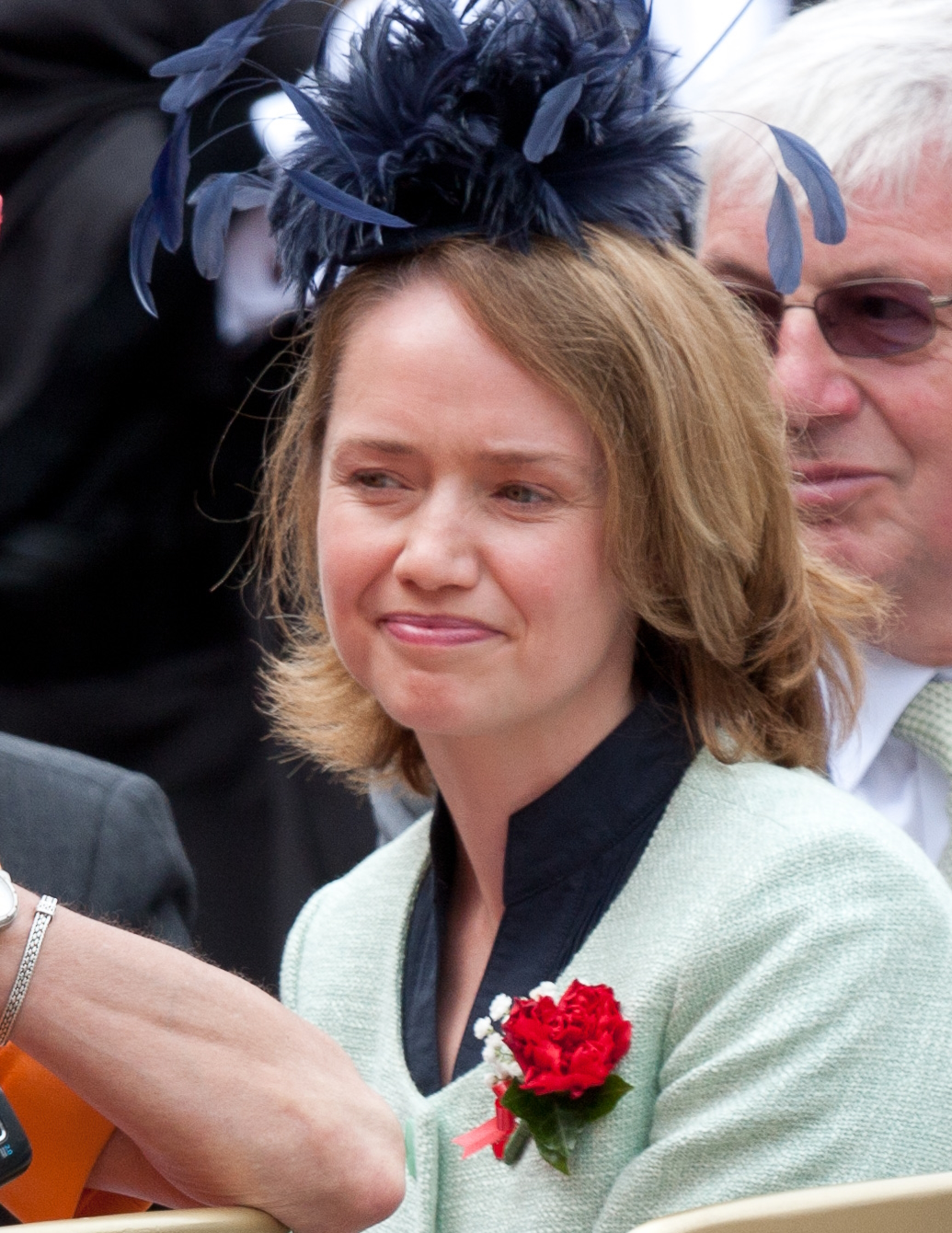

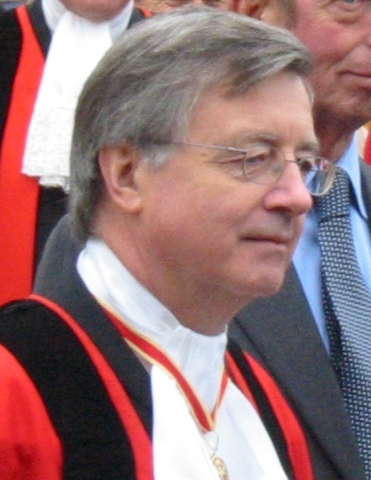
	First party	Second party	Third party
Leader	Sam Mézec	Kristina Moore	Philip Bailhache
Party	Reform Jersey	Better Way (Note: Better Way is a group of independent politicians who pledge to work together, and is not registered as a political party.)	JLC
Alliance	—	—	JLC–Progress
Leader's seat	St Helier South	St Mary, St Ouen, and St Peter	St Clement (D)
Last election	5	New	New
Seats won	10 / 49	4 / 49	2 / 49
Seat change	▲5	▲3	▲2
Popular vote	12,751	8,016	4,259
	Fourth party	Fifth party	Sixth party
Leader	Mark Boleat	Steve Pallett	—
Party	Jersey Alliance	Progress Party	Independents (Note: Not including Better Way.)
Alliance	—	JLC–Progress	—
Leader's seat	St Clement (D) (defeated)	St Brelade (D) (defeated)	—
Last election	New	New	44
Seats won	1 / 49	1 / 49	31 / 49
Seat change	▼8	▼1	▼13
Popular vote	9,479	4,376	61,051
- A map presenting the results of the election, with each dot representing one seat in the States Assembly. The top map shows the results for connétables, whilst the bottom shows results for deputies.
Chief Minister before election
John Le Fondré
Jersey Alliance
Chief Minister after election
Kristina Moore
Better Way

The 2022 Jersey general election was held on 22 June 2022 to elect connétables and deputies to the States Assembly. As in previous elections, the majority of seats were won by independents. The governing Jersey Alliance party suffered a heavy defeat, losing all but one of its seats. Following the election, a coalition government led by Better Way Deputy Kristina Moore was formed.

Independent politicians won 32 of the 49 seats in the Assembly. Reform Jersey won 10 seats, primarily in the new St Helier constituencies, the largest win in the party's history. Whilst Jersey Alliance won a sizable share of the popular vote, it only won a single seat; almost all of its members in the Assembly were voted out, most notably the incumbent Chief Minister John Le Fondré. The newly founded Jersey Liberal Conservatives and Progress Party, comprising the JLC–Progress coalition, received 2 and 1 seats respectively.

Despite widespread electoral reforms made in 2021 intended to improve civic engagement, turnout decreased from the previous election to 41.6%. Following the election, Jersey Alliance's single member in the Assembly resigned from the party after only a month, leaving it with no representation in the States Assembly. The Progress Party disbanded a year later in July 2023.

== Timeline ==
Key dates
Date	Event(s)	
Thursday 22 April 2021	The States Assembly approves a proposition setting 22 June 2022 as the date for the next general election. The proposition also included widespread electoral reforms for the 2022 election, including abolishing the position of senator and creating new electoral constituencies for deputies.	
Friday 29 April 2022	Final business meeting of the 2018–2022 Assembly.	
Monday 9 May 2022	Final meeting of the 2018–2022 Assembly to ceremonially mark Liberation Day.	
Tuesday 10 May 2022	Deadline for registration on the main voter register and registration for a postal vote at 12pm.	
Wednesday 11 May 2022	Opening of nominations of candidates. Beginning of election period (purdah).	
Friday 13 May 2022	Closing of nominations of candidates.	
Wednesday 18 May 2022	Announcement of candidates.	
Monday 13 June 2022	Pre-poll voting open for voters on the main voter register.	
Tuesday 14 June 2022	Pre-poll voting open for voters on the main voter register.	
Wednesday 15 June 2022	Pre-poll voting open for voters on the main voter register.	Deadline for registration on the supplementary voter register at 12pm.
Thursday 16 June 2022	Pre-poll voting open for voters on the main voter register.	
Friday 17 June 2022	Pre-poll voting open for voters on the main voter register.	
Wednesday 22 June 2022	Polling day – polls open from 8am to 8pm.	
Thursday 23 June 2022	Results announced for all 21 parishes and constituencies.	
Monday 27 June 2022	Elected members officially sworn in to the States Assembly. Deadline for nominations for Chief Minister – candidates had until 5pm to receive at least six nominations to be included on the ballot.	
Thursday 30 June 2022	First meeting of the new States Assembly to ceremonially mark the retirement of the Lieutenant Governor.	
Tuesday 5 July 2022	The new States Assembly met for the election of the new chief minister.	
Monday 11 July 2022	Chief minister-designate's nominations for other ministerial positions confirmed by the Assembly. Chief minister formally appointed to office.	
Tuesday 12 July 2022	End of election period (purdah). States members appointed to scrutiny panels and committees.	
Tuesday 19 July 2022	States members appointed to remaining scrutiny panels and committees.	

== Electoral system ==
The 2022 elections were the first to have been held under a new electoral system. Under the system, the role of Senators was abolished and replaced with 37 Deputies elected across nine districts via plurality block voting. The election of one Connétable from each of the twelve parishes was maintained.

This election saw the debut of many new political parties to a political landscape that has been traditionally dominated by independent candidates. Before the election, the newly formed centre-right Jersey Alliance, which included the previous Chief Minister John Le Fondré, who had led the previous Government of Jersey. The centre-right Liberal Conservatives and the centrist Progress Party entered into a political pact with one other for the election. The existing social-democratic Reform Jersey party also contested the election, and a group of independent candidates stood with a shared platform and agreed principles under the name of 'Better Way', including Chief Scrutineer and Senator Kristina Moore.

For the 2022 elections, the Constable of St. Martin brought forward an amendment to include "the choice of 'None of the Above' to be automatically included as a ballot option in any States Assembly election where the number of candidates in a District or Parish does not exceed the number of seats available, with an appropriate formal consequence being provided should this ballot option achieve a plurality of the votes cast." The change was subsequently approved by the States Assembly.

== Political parties and groups ==
The table below lists the parties or groups that nominated at least one candidate for the election:

Name		Ideology	Leader	2018 result	Pre-election seats
Name		Ideology	Leader	Seats	Pre-election seats
RJ	Reform Jersey	Social democracy	Sam Mézec	5 / 49	5 / 49 (Note: Trevor Pointon announced that he would stand for election as a Reform Jersey candidate, though continued to stand in the States Assembly as an independent until the election.)
JA	Jersey Alliance	Conservative liberalism	Mark Boleat	—N/a	9 / 49
PP	Progress Party (Note: In an electoral pact with the Liberal Conservatives)	Centrism	Steve Pallett	—N/a	2 / 49
JLC	Jersey Liberal Conservatives (Note: In an electoral pact with the Progress Party)	Liberal conservatism	Philip Bailhache	—N/a	0 / 49
BW	Better Way	Consensus government	Kristina Moore	—N/a	1 / 49
Ind	Independents	—N/a	—N/a	44 / 49	33 / 49

=== Notes ===
As the electorate can vote for more than one candidate, including voting for multiple candidates of differing political parties, the vote total is not indicative of the popular vote share of each party but rather the total number of votes each candidate received.

The 'Better Way' group ran as independents and are not a registered political party nor stood as a political party. Their candidates received 8,016 votes and 4 out of 5 of their candidates were elected.

== Results ==
=== By party ===
Party	Leader	Seats			Total votes	
Party	Leader		Of total			Of total
Reform Jersey	Sam Mézec	10	20.4%	10 / 49	12,751	12.3%
Better Way	Kristina Moore	4	8.2%	4 / 49	8,016	7.7%
Jersey Liberal Conservatives	Philip Bailhache	2	4.1%	2 / 49	4,259	4.1%
Jersey Alliance	Mark Boleat	1	2.0%	1 / 49	9,479	9.1%
Progress Party	Steve Pallett	1	2.0%	1 / 49	4,376	4.2%
Independents	—	31	65.3%	32 / 49	61,051	58.9%

=== List of elected members ===
==== Connétables ====
Parish	Name	Party	Majority
Grouville	Mark Labey	Independent	72
St Brelade	Mike Jackson	Independent	1,451
St Clement	Marcus Troy	Independent	1,748
St Helier	Simon Crowcroft	Independent	944
St John	Andy Jehan	Independent	1,036
St Lawrence	Deidre Mezbourian	Independent	301
St Martin	Karen Shenton-Stone	Independent	1,057
St Mary	David Johnson	Independent	83
St Ouen	Richard Honeycombe	Independent	512
St Peter	Richard Vibert	Independent	872
St Saviour	Kevin Lewis	Independent	396
Trinity	Philip Le Sueur	Jersey Alliance	441

==== Deputies ====
Constituency	Name	Party	Majority
St Helier South	Sam Mézec	Reform Jersey	364
St Helier South	Tom Coles	Reform Jersey	122
St Helier South	Beatriz Porée	Reform Jersey	88
St Helier South	David Warr	Better Way	25
St Helier Central	Carina Alves	Reform Jersey	437
St Helier Central	Robert Ward	Reform Jersey	413
St Helier Central	Lyndsay Feltham	Reform Jersey	343
St Helier Central	Catherine Curtis	Reform Jersey	323
St Helier Central	Geoff Southern	Reform Jersey	210
St Helier North	Inna Gardiner	Independent	928
St Helier North	Mary Le Hegarat	Independent	531
St Helier North	Max Andrews	Independent	399
St Helier North	Steve Ahier	Independent	262
St Saviour	Tom Binet	Independent	595
St Saviour	Malcom Ferey	Jersey Liberal Conservatives	374
St Saviour	Louise Doublet	Independent	326
St Saviour	Raluca Kovacs	Reform Jersey	86
St Saviour	Philip Ozouf	Independent	54
St Clement	Alex Curtis	Better Way	556
St Clement	Barbara Ward	Independent	486
St Clement	Philip Bailhache	Jersey Liberal Conservatives	322
St Clement	Karen Wilson	Independent	50
St Brelade	Helen Miles	Independent	1,042
St Brelade	Moz Scott	Independent	455
St Brelade	Johnathan Renouf	Independent	454
St Brelade	Montfort Tadier	Reform Jersey	175
St Mary, St Ouen, and St Peter	Kristina Moore	Better Way	1,677
St Mary, St Ouen, and St Peter	Lucy Stephenson	Better Way	1,186
St Mary, St Ouen, and St Peter	Ian Gorst	Independent	1,155
St Mary, St Ouen, and St Peter	Lyndon Farnham	Independent	48
St John, St Lawrence, and Trinity	Kirsten Morel	Independent	1,522
St John, St Lawrence, and Trinity	Hilary Jeune	Independent	1,435
St John, St Lawrence, and Trinity	Elaine Millar	Independent	1,075
St John, St Lawrence, and Trinity	Andy Howell	Independent	556
Grouville and St Martin	Carolyn Labey	Independent	674
Grouville and St Martin	Steve Luce	Progress Party	309
Grouville and St Martin	Rose Binet	Independent	174

== Aftermath ==
=== Government formation ===
2022 Chief Minister of Jersey election
- 5 July 2022
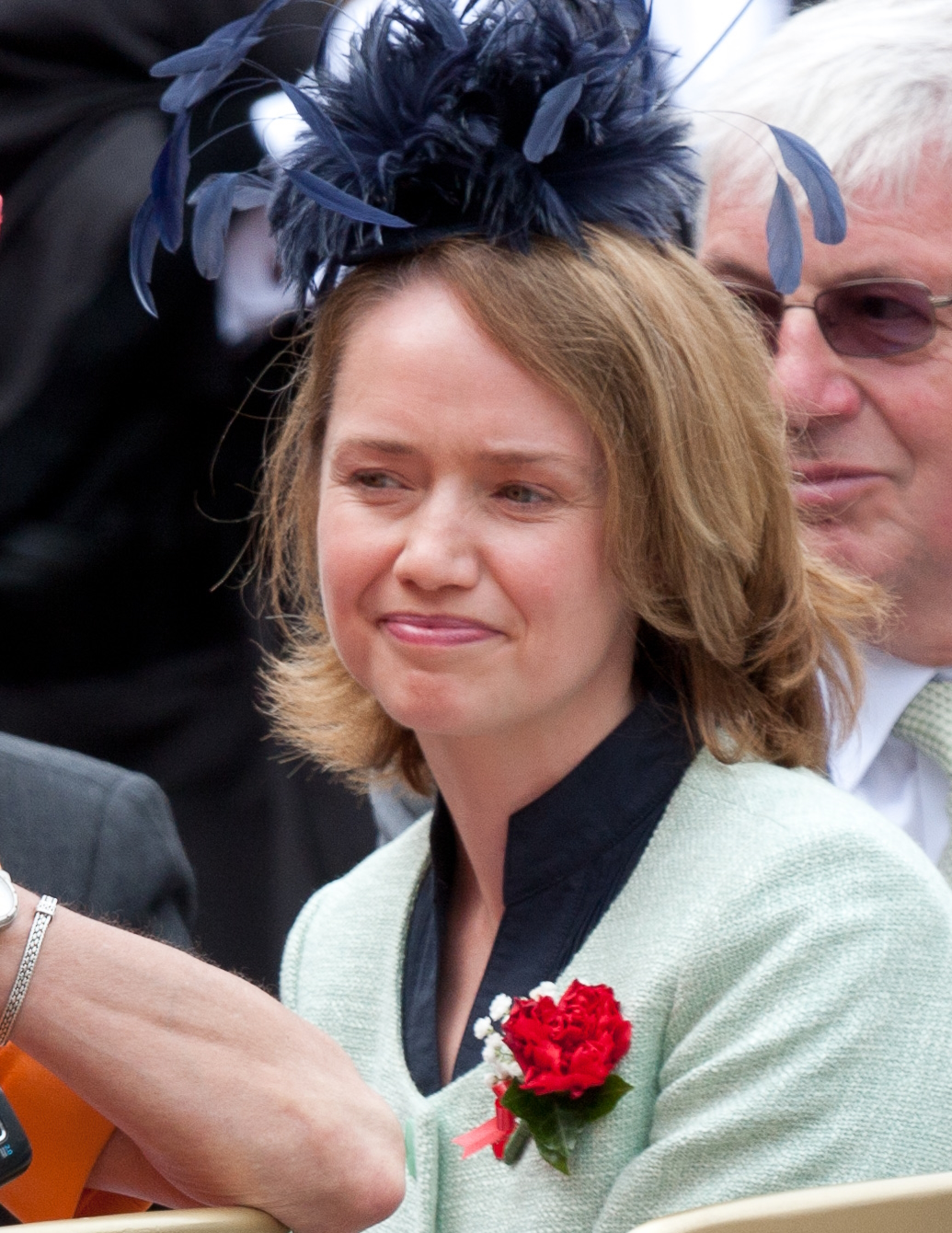

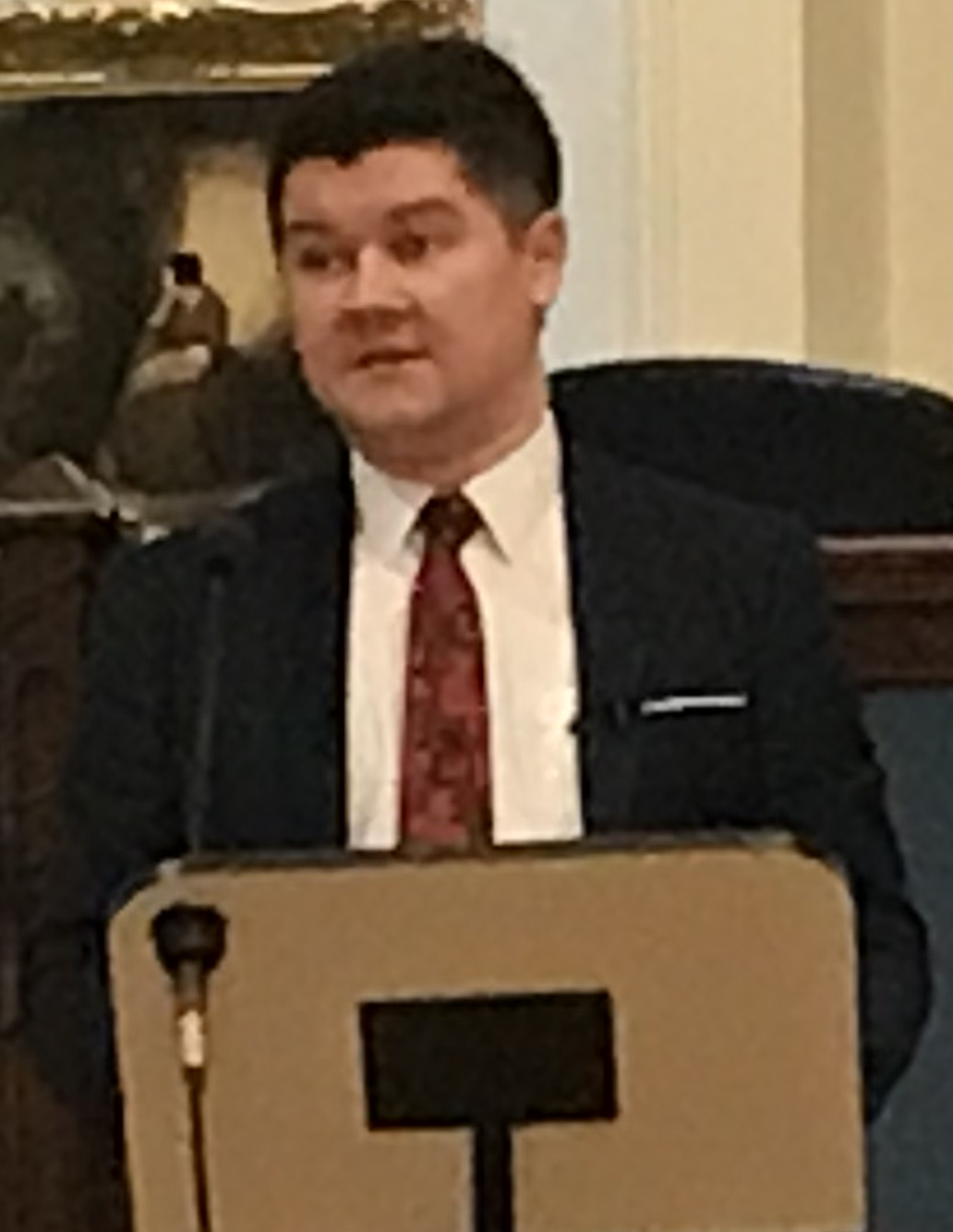
	Majority party	Minority party
Candidate	Kristina Moore	Sam Mézec
Party	Better Way	Reform Jersey
Leader's seat	St Mary, St Ouen, and St Peter	St Helier South
Members' vote	39	10
Percentage	79.6%	20.4%
Chief Minister before election
John Le Fondré
Jersey Alliance
Chief Minister after election
Kristina Moore
Better Way

The elected States members were officially sworn into office on 27 June. In order to be included in the vote for Chief Minister, candidates needed to receive nominations from six other States members by 5pm that day. Only three candidates put their names forward; Kristina Moore, (leader of Better Way), Sam Mézec (leader of Reform Jersey), and Philip Bailhache (leader of the Jersey Liberal Conservatives). Mark Boleat, leader of Jersey Alliance, had announced his intention to run for Chief Minister prior to the election, but lost his seat. Moore received 30 nominations, greater than the 25 votes needed to win the vote, immediately making her the clear frontrunner. Mézec received 9 nominations, clearing the threshold to be included on the ballot. Bailhache failed to receive enough nominations to be included, and withdrew from the race.

The new States Assembly held its first meeting on 5 July to choose the new Chief Minister. Moore won the vote 39–10, becoming the first woman to hold the office. Moore selected a mix of independent, Better Way, and JLC States members as her nominations for her Council of Ministers. The States Assembly confirmed her nominations on 11 July, creating the Moore ministry.

=== Collapse of parties ===
In July 2022, Jersey Alliance's sole elected States member, Philip Le Sueur, resigned from the party due to its poor electoral performance.

A year later in July 2023, the Progress Party disbanded, also citing disappointing performance in the 2022 election.

== See also ==
- Elections in Jersey
- Political parties in Jersey
- Politics of Jersey
- Constitution of Jersey
