= 2014 Jersey general election =

- 15 October 2014

All 49 seats in the States Assembly 25 seats needed for a majority
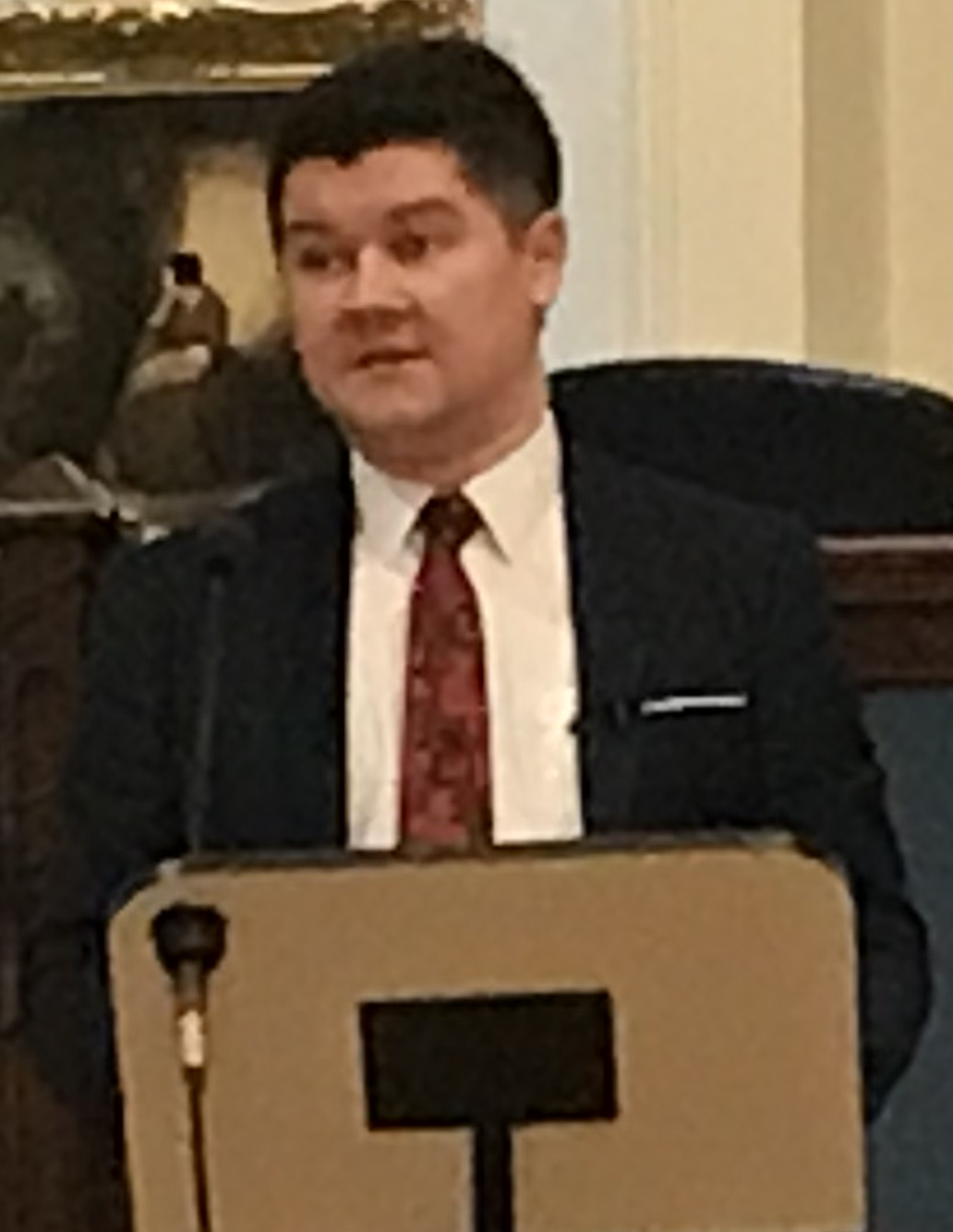
	First party	Second party
		IND
Leader	Sam Mézec	—
Party	Reform Jersey	Independents
Leader's seat	St Helier No. 2	—
Last election	New	45
Seats won	3 / 49	46 / 49
Seat change	(Note: Reform gained 3 seats between the 2011 and 2014 elections from by-election wins and independents joining the party.)	▲1 (Note: Electoral reforms meant the number of seats up for election increased from 45 in 2011 to 49.)
Popular vote	7,910	172,105
Percentage	4.4%	95.4%
Chief Minister before election
Ian Gorst
Independent
Chief Minister after election
Ian Gorst
Independent

General elections were held in Jersey on 15 October 2014 to elect the 49 members of the States Assembly which also coincided with a referendum on electoral reform.

== Electoral system ==
At the time of the election, the 49 members of the States consisted of three different types of members. The 29 deputies were elected from 18 districts; nine districts elected one deputy, five districts elected two deputies, two districts elected three deputies, and two districts elected four deputies, with voters able to cast as many votes as there were seats in their district. The 12 constables were elected, one from each of the 12 parishes, whilst the eight senators are elected on an island-wide basis, with each voter casting up to eight votes.

== Results ==
=== Results for senators ===
The results for the election of senators were as follows:

Party	Candidate	Votes	%	±%
Independent	Ian Gorst	14,035	9.6	
Independent	Philip Bailhache	13,759	9.4	
Independent	Andrew Green	13,252	9.1	
Independent	Alan Maclean	11,694	8.0	
Independent	Paul Routier	10,962	7.5	
Independent	Zoe Cameron	10,413	7.1	
Independent	Lyndon Farnham	10,413	7.1	
Independent	Philip Ozouf	10,080	6.9	
Independent	Sarah Ferguson	9,809	6.7	
Independent	Sean Dooley-Power	8,249	5.6	
Independent	John Young	7,074	4.8	
Independent	Malcolm Ferey	6,475	4.4	
Independent	Geoff Habin	5,328	3.6	
Reform Jersey	Anne Southern	4,281	2.9	
Independent	Guy de Faye	3,384	2.3	
Independent	Chris Magee	3,158	2.2	
Independent	Konrad Kruszynski	2,058	1.4	
Independent	David Richardson	1,801	1.2	
Rejected ballots		180	0.1	
Total votes		146,405	100	—
Turnout		25,110	40.1	

=== Results for connétables ===
The results for the election of connétables were as follows:

==== Grouville ====
John Le Maistre was elected unopposed.

==== St Brelade ====
Steve Pallett was elected unopposed.

==== St Clement ====
Leonard Norman was elected unopposed.

==== St Helier ====
Simon Crowcroft was elected unopposed.

==== St John ====
Christopher Taylor was elected unopposed.

==== St Lawrence ====
Deidre Mezbourian was elected unopposed.

==== St Martin ====
Michel le Troquer was elected unopposed.

==== St Mary ====
Party	Candidate	Votes	%	±%
Independent	Juliette Gallichan	376	50.4	
Independent	John Le Bailly	370	49.6	
Rejected ballots		0	0.0	
Total votes		746	100	—
Turnout		746	54.3	

==== St Ouen ====
Michael Paddock was elected unopposed.

==== St Peter ====
John Refault was elected unopposed.

==== St Saviour ====
Sadie Rennard was elected unopposed.

==== Trinity ====
Philip Le Sueur was elected unopposed.

=== Results for deputies ===
The results for the election of deputies were as follows:

==== Grouville ====
Carolyn Labey was elected unopposed.

==== St Brelade No. 1 ====
Party	Candidate	Votes	%	±%
Independent	Murray Norton	545	46.3	
Independent	Mike Jackson	452	38.4	
Independent	Angela Jeune	173	14.7	
Rejected ballots		8	0.7	
Total votes		1,178	100	—
Turnout		1,170	48.6	

==== St Brelade No. 2 ====
Party	Candidate	Votes	%	±%
Independent	Graham Truscott	1,073	24.0	
Reform Jersey	Montfort Tadier	890	19.9	
Independent	Natalie Duffy	760	17.0	
Independent	Jeff Hathaway	594	13.3	
Independent	Peter Troy	425	9.5	
Reform Jersey	Beatriz Porée	391	8.8	
Independent	Jane Blakeley	302	6.8	
Rejected ballots		30	0.7	
Total votes		4,465	100	—
Turnout		2,432	47.1	

==== St Clement ====
Party	Candidate	Votes	%	±%
Independent	Susan Pinel	1,541	35.5	
Independent	Simon Brée	1,364	31.4	
Independent	Gerard Baudains	1,006	23.2	
Independent	Darius Pearce	403	9.3	
Rejected ballots		25	0.6	
Total votes		4,339	100	—
Turnout		2,441	39.1	

==== St Helier No. 1 ====
Party	Candidate	Votes	%	±%
Independent	Judy Martin	964	30.7	
Independent	Russell Labey	811	25.9	
Independent	Scott Wickenden	476	15.2	
Reform Jersey	Shannen Kerrigan	355	11.3	
Independent	Nick Le Cornu	311	9.9	
Independent	Gino Risoli	192	6.1	
Rejected ballots		26	0.8	
Total votes		3,135	100	—
Turnout		1,437	26.9	

==== St Helier No. 2 ====
Party	Candidate	Votes	%	±%
Independent	Rod Bryans	685	26.2	
Reform Jersey	Sam Mézec	605	23.2	
Reform Jersey	Geoff Southern	566	21.7	
Independent	Bernard Manning	468	17.9	
Independent	John Greene	279	10.7	
Rejected ballots		9	0.3	
Total votes		2,612	100	—
Turnout		1,201	27.7	

==== St Helier No. 3&4 ====
Party	Candidate	Votes	%	±%
Independent	Jackie Hilton	1,712	19.6	
Independent	Richard Rondel	1,618	18.5	
Independent	Mike Higgins	1,245	14.2	
Independent	Andrew Lewis	1,126	12.9	
Independent	Christian May	769	8.8	
Reform Jersey	Laura Millen	622	7.1	
Independent	Ted Vibert	598	6.8	
Independent	Mary Ayling-Phillips	478	5.5	
Independent	Mary Jean-Osmond	460	5.3	
Independent	John Ttokkallos	104	1.2	
Rejected ballots		19	0.2	
Total votes		8,751	100	—
Turnout		2,732	32.6	

==== St John ====
Tracey Vallois was elected unopposed.

==== St Lawrence ====
John Le Fondre and Eddie Noel were elected unopposed.

==== St Martin ====
Steve Luce was elected unopposed.

==== St Mary ====
Party	Candidate	Votes	%	±%
Independent	David Johnson	408	54.5	
Independent	Mark Evans	333	44.5	
Rejected ballots		8	1.1	
Total votes		749	100	—
Turnout		749	54.1	

==== St Ouen ====
Party	Candidate	Votes	%	±%
Independent	Richard Renouf	1,215	81.2	
Independent	Chris Lamy	248	16.6	
Rejected ballots		34	2.3	
Total votes		1,497	100	—
Turnout		1,497	48.3	

==== St Peter ====
Party	Candidate	Votes	%	±%
Independent	Kristina Moore	1,335	87.0	
Reform Jersey	Debbie Hardisty	200	13.0	
Rejected ballots		0	0.0	
Total votes		1535	100	—
Turnout		1,562	43.3	

==== St Saviour No. 1 ====
Party	Candidate	Votes	%	±%
Independent	Jeremy Maçon	780	37.5	
Independent	Peter McLinton	656	31.5	
Independent	Rob Duhamel	630	30.3	
Rejected ballots		16	0.8	
Total votes		2,082	100	—
Turnout		1,246	40.7	

==== St Saviour No. 2 ====
Party	Candidate	Votes	%	±%
Independent	Kevin Lewis	727	43.9	
Independent	Louise Doublet	632	38.1	
Independent	Maureen Morgan	285	17.2	
Rejected ballots		13	0.8	
Total votes		1,657	100	—
Turnout		993	33.4	

==== St Saviour No. 3 ====
Terry MacDonald was elected unopposed.

==== Trinity ====
Party	Candidate	Votes	%	±%
Independent	Anne Pryke	624	50.2	
Independent	Hugh Raymond	608	48.9	
Rejected ballots		12	1.0	
Total votes		1,244	100	—
Turnout		1,244	58.5	

== See also ==
- Elections in Jersey
- Political parties in Jersey
- Politics of Jersey
- Constitution of Jersey
