= Carina Alves =

Jersey politician

Deputy Carina Alves

Deputy of St Helier Central
- Incumbent
- Assumed office 27 June 2022 Serving with Robert Ward, Catherine Curtis, Lyndsay Feltham, Geoff Southern
- Chief Minister: Kristina Moore (2022-2024) Lyndon Farnham (2024-)

Deputy of St Helier No. 2
- In office 2018–2022 Serving with Geoff Southern, Robert Ward
- Chief Minister: John Le Fondre

Personal details
- Born: 1986 (age 39–40)
- Party: Reform Jersey
- Occupation: Politician

Carina Alves (born 1986) is a Jersey politician who has served as Assistant Chief Minister, Assistant Minister for Housing, and Assistant Minister for Education and Lifelong Learning since February 2024. A member of Reform Jersey, Alves served as Deputy for St Helier No. 2 from 2018 to 2022, and has served as Deputy for St Helier Central since 2022.

Since 2022, Alves has been the chair of the Political Awareness and Education Sub-Committee, vice chair of the Privileges and Procedures Committee, and an executive committee member of the Commonwealth Parliamentary Association.

Prior to entering politics, Alves worked as a mathematics teacher.

== Early life ==
Alves is of Madeiran descent and was born in Jersey, in 1986. She was the first Head Girl in the history of Les Quennevais School, and attended Hautlieu School for Sixth Form. She attended the University of South Wales where she achieved a Bachelor of Science degree in Mathematics and Computer Science and secondary school qualified teacher status.

== Teaching career ==
Prior to attending university, Alves worked as a Teaching Assistant at Le Rocquier School from May 2005 to August 2008.

After qualifying, Alves returned to Le Rocquier School and taught as a Mathematics teacher from September 2011 to August 2017. She took up a new position as Second in Charge of Mathematics at Les Quennevais School in September 2017 and remained until May 2018.

Alves has stayed involved in teaching as a private Mathematics tutor and GCSE Mathematics examiner for Pearson.

== Political career ==
Alves stood for election to St Helier No. 2 in 2018 with Reform Jersey, winning with 605 votes. She was the first person of Madeiran descent to be elected to the States Assembly in Jersey.

In November 2018, Alves brought a proposition to allow Asbestos victims in Jersey to be entitled to compensation, following a petition launched after the death of islander Brian Coutanche, who had been diagnosed with mesothelioma. Alves' proposition won unanimous support and compensation was introduced in October 2019.

In 2021, commenting on the principle of assisted dying, Alves said she would "never want anyone to restrict my choices on something that impacts me and my body."

Alves contributed an article to The Parliamentarian in June 2021 on the subject of electoral reform in Jersey.

In November 2021, a report from the Chairman of the Complaints Panel, Geoffrey Crill, stated that the Government was not taking official complaints seriously. Deputy Alves, in her then role as Chair of the Privileges and Procedures Committee, echoed Crill's comments, noting that it had "disappointing" to see several Departments "disrespect" the complaints process.

Alves successfully stood for re-election in 2022, this time standing in the newly created constituency of St Helier Central. Alves secured 961 votes, with fellow Reform Jersey members, Rob Ward (937), Catherine Curtis (847), Lyndsay Feltham (836) and Geoff Southern (734) sweeping the other four seats. They joined Sam Mézec, Raluca Kovacs, Beatriz Porée, Tom Coles and Montford Tadier who were also successful at the 2022 election and increased Reform Jersey's seat tally to 10.

In December 2022, she brought amendments to that year's Government Plan to extend the £20 bus card scheme to all islanders in full-time education and to provide free GP care for all under 18s.

A proposition brought in 2025 to allow non-British citizens with permanent entitled status to stand for election in the next General Election was unsuccessful, securing 18 votes in favour and 24 votes against. However, an amendment to reduce the time period to achieve permanent entitled status in the island from 30 years to 25 years was adopted by the Assembly.

Additionally, Alves, in her role as Assistant Chief Minister with responsibility for Diversity, Equality and Inclusion, is the current Chair of the Jersey International Cultural Centre and gave an update on its future direction in January 2025.

Alves has also called for paid menstrual leave to be introduced for people with endometriosis, pointing to new legislation introduced in Portugal where endometriosis and adenomyosis sufferers can receive up to three paid days of leave per month.

In November 2025, the Government of Jersey relaxed rules for businesses applying to employ registered and licensed employees. As Assistant Chief Minister, Alves said she was "pleased to be able to expand licensed roles to include educational support staff and nursery workers." The changes were welcomed by the Chamber of Commerce with president Lee Madden commenting that the new rules 'offer a more realistic framework for managing the Island's workforce needs'.
