= 2026 Jersey general election =

- 7 June 2026

All 49 seats in the States Assembly 25 seats needed for a majority
- Turnout: 32.4%
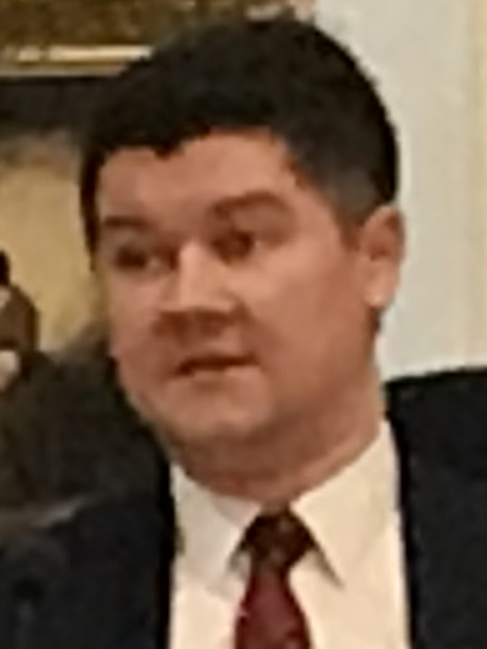
	First party	Second party	Third party
		IND	PF
Leader	Sam Mézec	—	Nick Le Cornu
Party	Reform Jersey	Independents (Note: Six elected independent candidates were publicly associated with Value Jersey, a political movement which is not registered as a political party.)	People First
Leader's seat	Senator (defeated)	—	St Helier South (defeated)
Last election	10	31	New
Seats won	7 / 49	42 / 49	0 / 49
Seat change	▼3	▲11	Steady
- A map presenting the results of the election, with each dot representing one seat in the States Assembly. Colours indicate formal party status.
Chief Minister before election
Lyndon Farnham
Independent
Chief Minister after election
Lyndon Farnham (designate)
Independent

The 2026 Jersey general election was held on 7 June 2026 to elect nine senators, 28 deputies and 12 connétables to the States Assembly.

A total of 92 candidates stood for election, including 17 candidates for the nine senatorial seats. Six of the 12 connétable seats were uncontested.

Following the election, incumbent Chief Minister Lyndon Farnham was the only States member-elect nominated for the office, meaning that he was selected as Chief Minister-designate when the new States Assembly met on 19 June 2026.

== Timeline ==
Key dates
Date	Event(s)
Tuesday 1 April 2025	The States Assembly approved a proposition from the Privileges and Procedures Committee setting Sunday 7 June 2026 as the date for the next election.
Monday 20 April 2026	Opening of nominations of candidates. Beginning of election period (purdah).
Wednesday 22 April 2026	Closure of nomination period for candidates.
Monday 27 April 2026	Full list of candidates published.
Saturday 9 May 2026	Final meeting of the 2022–2026 Assembly to ceremonially mark Liberation Day.
Sunday 7 June 2026	Polling day — polls opened from 8am to 8pm.
Wednesday 10 June 2026	A recount is held in the St Helier Central Deputy contest after 21 votes separated Reform Jersey candidate Lee Carpenter and independent candidate Robin Ward. The result was confirmed
Thursday 11 June 2026	Incumbent Chief Minister Lyndon Farnham announced as the only States Member nominated to stand for Chief Minister for the new term.
Friday 19 June 2026	The new States Assembly meets to formally elect Farnham as Chief Minister.

== Electoral system ==
The 2026 election was held after the reintroduction of nine island-wide senators, a role that had been abolished before the 2022 general election. The number of deputies was reduced from 37 to 28, with one seat removed from each of the nine deputy constituencies. The election of one connétable from each of the twelve parishes was maintained.

The election was also the first Jersey general election in modern times to be held on a Sunday rather than a Wednesday, following a decision by the States Assembly.

Prior to polling day, automatic voter registration was introduced to Jersey's system of voting for the first time. Eligible islanders would now be included on the electoral register without needing to manually sign up.

== Campaign conduct ==
The Jersey Electoral Authority intervened several times during the campaign. In May 2026, after a complaint that an incumbent Connétable had used an official mailing list and website to promote his candidacy, the Authority reminded elected members that parish resources should not be used for electoral purposes. It also issued a statement correcting suggestions that it had approved material published by Value Jersey. In June 2026, the Authority criticised election-related misinformation on social media, describing it as a 'poison' that harmed the democratic process. One States Member criticised the Authority, saying that the required compliance forms had not been ready in time.

The Commonwealth Parliamentary Association sent a delegation of Commonwealth parliamentarians to observe the election process. After the election the International Election Observation Mission and the Jersey Electoral Authority both raised concerns about whether election law provided a level playing field between registered political parties and non-party campaign groups.

== Turnout ==
Turnout in 2026 was reported at 32.4%, down from 41.6% at the previous election in 2022. However, the number of people who cast a vote increased from 25,264 in 2022 to 27,691 in 2026. The lower turnout percentage was attributed largely to the introduction of automatic voter registration, which increased the number of people on the electoral roll from 60,701 to 85,470.

Voter turnout in Jersey has historically been low by international standards. Statistics Jersey’s 2025 Better Life Index ranked Jersey last for civic engagement among all OECD member and partner countries following the 2022 election

== Political parties and groups ==
Two registered political parties participated in the election: Reform Jersey and People First. In addition, Value Jersey, a political movement rather than a registered party, promoted a policy platform that was endorsed by some independent candidates.

=== Reform Jersey ===
Reform Jersey fielded 16 candidates in the 2026 election, including nine sitting members seeking re-election. Seven Reform Jersey candidates were elected. Party leader Sam Mézec, who stood for one of the nine Senatorial seats, was not elected.

Their manifesto was entitled Turning the Tide. It included costed key pledges on housing support for young Jersey people returning from university in the UK, developing new family-sized homes and affordable housing, reducing the use of overseas consultants, improving bus and cycle infrastructure, renovating Fort Regent, introducing tax allowances for pensioners, reducing Jersey's Marginal Rate on tax and removing the upper earnings cap on Social Security contributions.

=== People First Party ===
A new left-wing political party called People First Party fielded two candidates, neither of whom were elected.

=== Value Jersey ===
Nine independent candidates publicly associated themselves with the political movement Value Jersey, six of whom were elected. Its 'blueprint' argued that Jersey’s affordability and prosperity problems stem from a stalled economy, weakened productivity and rising costs for households, businesses and government. It called for disciplined government, stronger growth and greater competition as practical steps to reduce costs, restore confidence and avoid creating larger problems for the future.

Ahead of the 2026 vote, the States Assembly introduced a voluntary code of practice, requiring candidates to declare if they are a member of a non-party political group. Due to its status as a self-declared political movement, Value Jersey asserted these regulations would not apply, including requirements to declare where funding comes from. Some politicians in Jersey have called for Value Jersey to be more transparent with its funding and exactly which candidates are aligned with its movement. In response to scrutiny, Value Jersey clarified that the movement had received 58 donations from anonymous supporters, including a donation of £10,000 and a donation from an anonymous UK-based individual with business interests in Jersey.

== Results ==
=== Overview ===
Independent candidates won 42 of the 49 seats. Six of those independents were publicly associated with support of Value Jersey, while Reform Jersey won seven seats, down from ten at the 2022 Jersey general election.

ITV News described the 2026 election as a vote for stability, contrasting it with the 2022 election, which it characterised as being defined by a desire for change. It noted that five of the nine elected Senators were serving members of the Council of Ministers, including Ian Gorst, Lyndon Farnham and Elaine Millar, who finished second, third and fourth respectively in the Senatorial contest. But eight sitting States Members failed to be re-elected, including three ministers. Reform Jersey leader Sam Mézec was among those defeated, finishing tenth in the island-wide election for Senator, in which the top nine candidates were elected.

Local media noted the increased representation of women in the States Assembly. Bailiwick Express reported that women had won 22 of the 49 seats, representing approximately 45% of elected members, while the Jersey Evening Post headlined its front page coverage: ‘It shows how far Jersey has come’.

BBC News highlighted that Gabriel Raimondo, elected ten days after his 18th birthday, was the youngest ever States Member.

=== By formal party status and political affiliation ===
Political affiliations among the 49 elected members. The six purple dots identify members associated with Value Jersey, but those members were formally elected as independents and form part of the total of 42 independents.

Formal party status	Seats		
Formal party status		Of total	
Reform Jersey	7	14.3%	7 / 49
Independents (Note: Six independent members were associated with or endorsed by Value Jersey.)	42	85.7%	42 / 49
People First	0	0.0%	0 / 49

Six of the 42 elected independents were associated with or endorsed by Value Jersey. This was an overlapping political affiliation rather than a separate formal party classification.

=== List of elected members ===
==== Senators ====
Name	Party/affiliation	Votes
Helen Miles	Independent	15,859
Ian Gorst	Independent	15,667
Lyndon Farnham	Independent	14,217
Elaine Millar	Independent	14,208
Serena Guthrie	Independent (Note: Associated with or endorsed by Value Jersey.)	12,588
Tom Binet	Independent	12,584
Alan Maclean	Independent	12,506
Mark Boleat	Independent	11,948
Mary Le Hegarat	Independent	11,571

==== Connétables ====
Parish	Name	Party/affiliation	Majority
Grouville	Mark Labey	Independent	932
St Brelade	Steve Pallett	Independent	754
St Clement	Marcus Troy	Independent	1,588
St Helier	Inna Gardiner	Independent	780
St John	Andy Jehan	Independent	1,015
St Lawrence	Tina Palmer	Independent	543
St Martin	Karen Shenton Stone	Independent	1,021
St Mary	David Johnson	Independent	195
St Ouen	Richard Honeycombe	Independent	698
St Peter	Richard Vibert	Independent	1,064
St Saviour	Dave Curtis	Independent	264
Trinity	Andy Howell	Independent	511

==== Deputies ====
Constituency	Name	Party/affiliation	Majority
St Helier South	Samantha Gleave	Independent (Note: Associated with or endorsed by Value Jersey.)| style="text-align:right;" | 247	
St Helier South	Tom Coles	Reform Jersey	85
St Helier South	Beatriz Porée	Reform Jersey	27
St Helier Central	Carina Alves	Reform Jersey	294
St Helier Central	Lyndsay Feltham	Reform Jersey	170
St Helier Central	Catherine Curtis	Reform Jersey	38
St Helier Central	Lee Carpenter (Note: A recount was held in St Helier Central after Carpenter finished 21 votes ahead of Robin Ward, the highest-placed unelected candidate. The result did not change.)	Reform Jersey	22
St Helier North	Gerald Voisin	Independent (Note: Associated with or endorsed by Value Jersey.)	626
St Helier North	Max Andrews	Independent	277
St Helier North	Victoria Li	Independent	112
St Saviour	Malcolm Ferey	Independent	759
St Saviour	Louise Doublet	Independent	547
St Saviour	Chris Leck	Independent	225
St Saviour	Robert Parker	Independent (Note: Associated with or endorsed by Value Jersey.)	120
St Clement	Alex Curtis	Independent	293
St Clement	Barbara Ward	Independent	117
St Clement	Karen Wilson	Independent	114
St Brelade	Jonathan Renouf	Independent	1,262
St Brelade	Montfort Tadier	Reform Jersey	970
St Brelade	Gabriel Raimondo	Independent (Note: Associated with or endorsed by Value Jersey.)	451
St Mary, St Ouen, and St Peter	Lucy Stephenson	Independent	1,151
St Mary, St Ouen, and St Peter	Christopher Rebindaine	Independent	1,038
St Mary, St Ouen, and St Peter	Arlene Maltman	Independent	879
St John, St Lawrence, and Trinity	Hilary Jeune	Independent	1,569
St John, St Lawrence, and Trinity	Phil Romeril	Independent (Note: Associated with or endorsed by Value Jersey.)	1,330
St John, St Lawrence, and Trinity	Kirsten Morel	Independent	801
Grouville and St Martin	Carolyn Labey	Independent	1,076
Grouville and St Martin	Rose Binet	Independent	543

== Government formation ==
=== Chief Minister ===
On 11 June 2026, the States Assembly announced that incumbent Chief Minister Lyndon Farnham was the only Member nominated to stand for the role, having received eight nominations from fellow States Members-elect. As only one Member had put their name forward, no vote was required under the Standing Orders of the States Assembly.

Farnham made a statement and answered questions at the States meeting on 19 June, after which he was selected as Chief Minister designate. Other ministers, including Chief Minister are scheduled to formally take up their positions on 29 June 2026.

== See also ==
- Elections in Jersey
- Political parties in Jersey
- Politics of Jersey
- Constitution of Jersey
