= Catherine Curtis =

Jersey politician

Deputy Catherine Curtis

Minister for Education and Lifelong Learning
- Incumbent
- Assumed office 30 June 2026
- Preceded by: Robert Ward

Deputy of St Helier Central
- Incumbent
- Assumed office 27 June 2022 Serving with Carina Alves, Lyndsay Feltham, Lee Carpenter

Personal details
- Born: 1964 (age 61–62) Jersey
- Party: Reform Jersey
- Occupation: Politician

Catherine Curtis (born 1964) is a Jersey politician who has served in the States Assembly as Deputy for St Helier Central since the 2022 Jersey general election. A member of Reform Jersey, she was re-elected in 2026 and appointed Minister for Education and Lifelong Learning in June 2026.

== Early life ==
Curtis was born in Jersey in 1964 and spent much of her childhood on the Island as well as periods in Guernsey and Kent. In the 1980s, Curtis spent six years living in Spain with her then husband and young family. They returned to Jersey in the mid-1990s.

Before entering politics, Curtis founded Jersey Home & Petsitters in 2003. She later ran an international product business whose products received a number of design awards. She subsequently founded a grave-maintenance business.

Curtis volunteered as a Rates Assessor for the Parish of St Helier.

== Political career ==
Curtis was elected to the States Assembly at the 2022 Jersey general election, standing for Reform Jersey in St Helier Central. She won one of the constituency's five Deputy seats, receiving 847 votes.

During the 2022–2026 Assembly, Curtis chaired the Children, Education and Home Affairs Scrutiny Panel. The panel's work under her chairship included reviews of secondary education funding and children's online harms. Its 2024 report on secondary education funding recommended that the Government reconsider the selective transfer of pupils to Hautlieu School at age 14. Its 2025 online harms review recommended the development of a comprehensive online safety strategy for children in Jersey.

As a backbencher, Curtis lodged a number of propositions. In 2023, the Assembly adopted, as amended, her proposal for work to reopen the La Collette reuse centre. In 2024, she proposed changes to prevent landlords from imposing blanket bans on tenants keeping pets without good reason; the Assembly instead adopted an amended proposition calling for guidance for landlords and tenants. In 2025, the Assembly unanimously adopted, as amended, her proposition calling for changes to road traffic offences and penalties following serious or fatal collisions.

Curtis was re-elected at the 2026 Jersey general election after a recount in St Helier Central. She received 850 votes and was elected alongside Carina Alves, Lee Carpenter and Lyndsay Feltham. Later that month, she was elected unopposed as Minister for Education and Lifelong Learning in Lyndon Farnham's Council of Ministers.
