= Raluca Kovacs =

Deputy Raluca Kovacs

Deputy of St Saviour
- Incumbent
- Assumed office 27 June 2022 Serving with Philip Ozouf, Malcolm Ferey, Louise Doublet, Tom Binet
- Chief Minister: Kristina Moore (2022-2024) Lyndon Farnham (2024-)

Personal details
- Party: Reform Jersey
- Occupation: Politician

Raluca Kovacs is a Jersey politician who currently serves as Deputy for St Saviour since 2022. She was elected for the first time in the 2022 Jersey General Election as a member of Reform Jersey.

Kovacs is a member of the Public Accounts Committee, a member of the Assemblée Parlementaire de la Francophonie, a member of the Machinery of Government Review Sub-Committee, a member of the Commonwealth Parliamentary Association, a member of the Bailiff's Consultative Panel, a member of the Diversity Forum and a member of the Political Awareness and Education Sub-Committee.

== Business career and community work ==
Kovac runs the Aha restaurant located in Howard Davis Park alongside her husband.

Since moving to Jersey in 2009, Kovacs has held a number of community roles including chairing the Romanian Association, co-chairing HSBC's Diversity and Inclusion working group, organising the 'Big Latch' events to promote breastfeeding alongside Family Nursing and Home Care, and volunteering with Mustard Seed.

== Political career ==
Kovacs was first elected to the States Assembly in 2022 and is the first Romanian national to be elected to any British parliament.

A 2022 proposition brought by Kovacs to exempt food from Jersey's Goods and Services Tax (GST) was defeated by 28 votes to 17.

In 2023, Kovacs asked the States Assembly to provide extra support to parents of premature babies or babies requiring neonatal care during the first three months of their child's life. The proposition was unanimously backed by States Members.

Kovacs won the 2024 New Parliamentarian Award at the 67th Commonwealth Parliamentary Association (CPA) conference in recognition of her contribution to promoting parliamentary democracy.

In December 2024, Kovacs' amended proposition to provide more funding for Jersey athletes competing in off-Island competitions won unanimous backing from the Assembly.

In May 2025, a proposition from Kovacs called for a review of social housing rents in the Island and asked the Assembly to approve finding ways of reducing accommodation rental costs in the public sector.
