= 2014 Jersey electoral reform referendum =

A referendum on electoral reform was held in Jersey on 15 October 2014, alongside general elections. Voters were asked whether elected constables should continue to automatically become members of the States. Their continued automatic membership was approved by 62% of voters.

== Background ==
Constables are elected heads of the 12 parishes in Jersey, and at the time of the referendum they automatically became members of the States upon their election as Constables. A non-binding referendum was held on electoral reform in April 2013, which put forward three proposals on how members of the States were elected, including one in which the Constables were removed from the States. This option was defeated in a second round of voting by a proposal that involved retaining the seats of the Constables. In July 2013 the proposals were rejected by the States by a vote of 28–21.

In November 2013 members of the States agreed to a second referendum on the subject of electoral reform. Initially two questions were proposed: whether members of the States should all be classified with the same status, and whether Constables should lose their automatic membership. However, in December the legislature decided to have only one question on the referendum. The Privileges and Procedures Committee of the States had planned for the referendum question to be:

Changes to the membership of the States Assembly are being proposed from 2018.

- There would be a single type of elected member of the States Assembly.
- 49 Members would be elected.
- The allocation of seats within parish districts would be proportional to the population in each district.

Should this proposed new system be introduced? Yes or No.

The States later voted to have one question, on the status of elected constables. It read:

Should the constables remain as members of the States as an automatic right? Yes or No.

== Campaign ==
The "yes" campaign, in favour of retaining the automatic membership of constables was supported by Chief Minister Ian Gorst.

== Results ==
Map showing how each parish voted in the referendum

Choice	Votes	%
For	15,068	62.45
Against	9,061	37.55
Invalid/blank votes	160	–
Total	24,289	100
Registered voters/turnout	62,539	38.84
Source: Vote.je
