= Robert Ward (Jersey politician) =

Jersey politician

Deputy Robert Ward
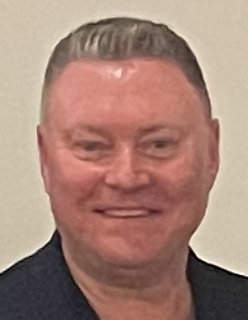
- Ward in 2024

Minister for Education and Lifelong Learning
- Incumbent
- Assumed office 27 February 2024
- Chief Minister: Lyndon Farnham
- Preceded by: Position established

Deputy of St Helier Central
- Incumbent
- Assumed office 27 June 2022
- Serving with: Carina Alves; Lyndsay Feltham; Catherine Curtis; Geoff Southern
- Majority: 413

Deputy of St Helier No. 2
- In office 1 June 2018 – 27 June 2022
- Serving with: Geoff Southern; Carina Alves
- Majority: 146

Personal details
- Party: Reform Jersey
- Children: 2
- Education: University of Sussex

Robert James (Rob) Ward is a former member of Jersey's States Assembly who served as Minister for Education and Lifelong Learning from 2024 to 2026.

== Early years ==
Prior to entering politics, Ward studied science at the University of Sussex and worked as a teacher for 25 years. During this time, he became a member of the National Education Union, and eventually became President of its Jersey Branch.

== Political career ==
A member of Reform Jersey, he served as Deputy for St Helier No. 2 from 2018 to 2022, and as Deputy of St Helier Central from 2022 to 2026.

In 2022, Ward disclosed that he had been diagnosed with prostate cancer and had undergone surgery. He subsequently advocated wider access to prostate-cancer screening in Jersey.

At the 2026 Jersey general election, Ward stood as the Reform Jersey candidate for Connétable of St Helier, rather than seeking re-election as a deputy. He was defeated by Inna Gardiner, receiving 1,960 votes to Gardiner's 2,740. He consequently left the Assembly at the end of the term.
