= Reform Jersey =

Social-democratic political party in Jersey

- Governing body: Party Executive Committee
- Leader: Sam Mézec
- Deputy Leader: Lyndsay Feltham
- Chairperson: Helen Evans
- Secretary: David Rotherham
- Treasurer: Mericia Andrade
- Founded: 2012 (14 years ago)
- Registered: 4 July 2014 (12 years ago)
- Youth wing: Reform Youth
- Ideology: Social democracy Progressivism Environmentalism
- Political position: Centre-left
- Colours: Blue Red
- States Assembly: 7 / 49

Website
- www.reformjersey.je

Reform Jersey (Jèrriais: Èforme Jèrri) is a centre-left social-democratic political party in Jersey. In all general elections since 2014, Reform has won the most seats of any party in the States Assembly. However, it has not won a majority of seats in any general election due to the large number of independents in the Assembly.

Reform was initially founded as a pressure group in 2012 to campaign for electoral reform in the run up to the 2013 electoral reform referendum. It first stood candidates for election in the 2014 by-elections, where it won two seats. It officially registered as a political party in July 2014 to compete in the 2014 general election. Reform increased its number of seats at the 2018 and 2022 general elections, but lost three seats at the 2026 election. It has never won a majority in the States Assembly. It was initially a junior coalition partner in the Le Fondré government, but left the coalition in November 2020 to support a vote of no confidence against it.

In January 2024, Reform returned to government following a vote of no confidence in Kristina Moore as a coalition partner in the Farnham government.

At the 2026 Jersey general election, Reform Jersey won seven seats, down from ten at the previous election. Party leader Sam Mézec lost his seat after finishing tenth in the island-wide election for Senator, while Education Minister Rob Ward was defeated in the election for Connétable of St Helier. Mézec later announced he would stand down as party leader.

== History ==
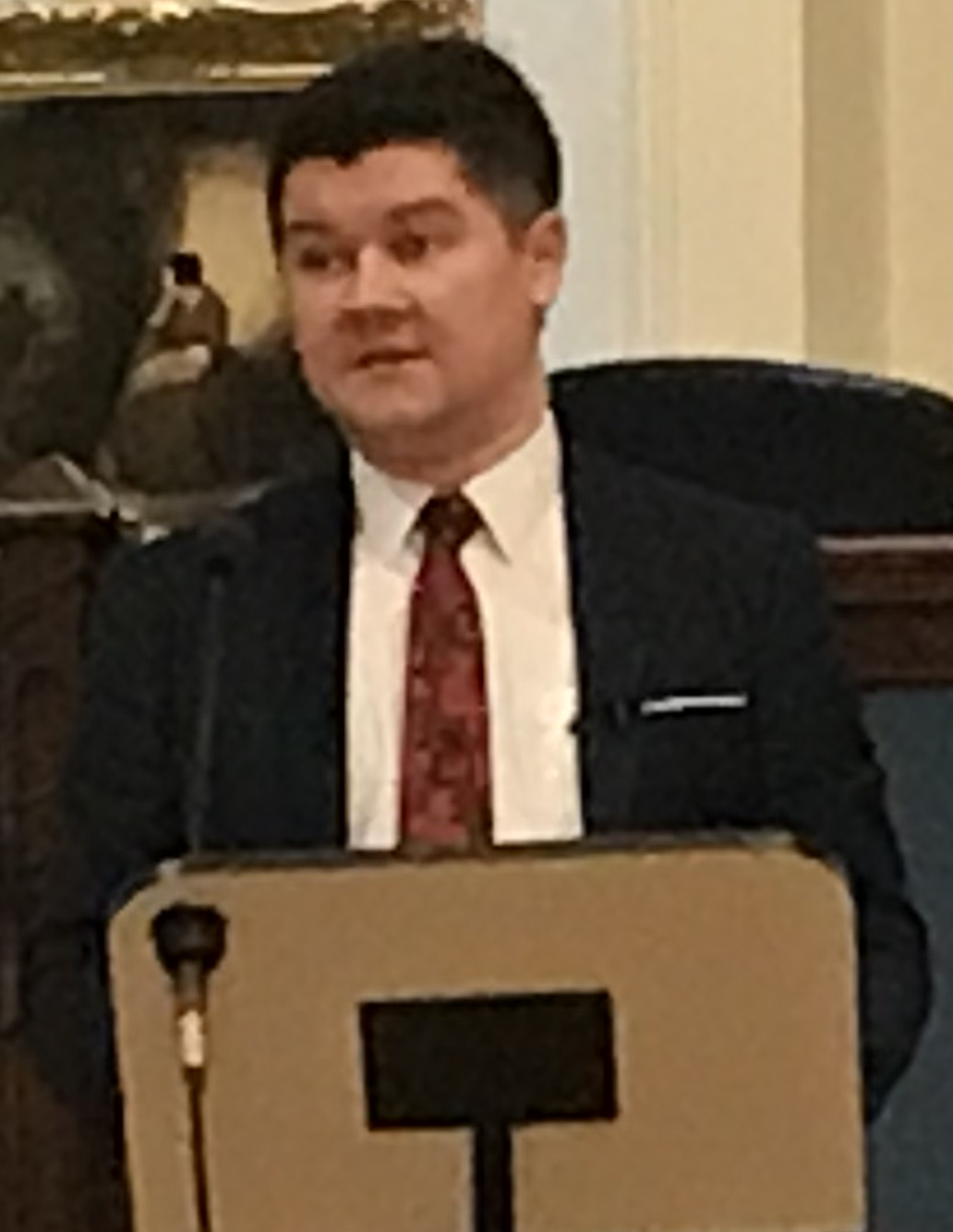
Sam Mézec has been the leader of Reform since its foundation.

=== Formation ===
Reform Jersey was founded in 2012 as a pressure group by Montfort Tadier and Sam Mézec. On 24 April 2014, Deputies Mézec and Nick Le Cornu announced that it would become a party to contest the 2014 general election scheduled for October. It was legally registered as a political party at the Royal Court on 4 July 2014. Reform Jersey founding member Deputy Le Cornu was expelled from the party in September 2014 for posting an offensive Tweet about another politician.

=== Candidates ===
For the 2014 general election on 15 October 2014, Reform Jersey put up eight candidates. Deputies Sam Mézec, Montfort Tadier and Geoff Southern were re-elected but none of the new Reform candidates were successful.

In the 2018 general election on 16 May 2018, the party returned four deputies (including new Deputies Robert Ward and Carina Alves), with Mézec gaining a senatorial seat. On 3 July 2018, Mézec was appointed first Minister of Children and Housing. After nearly two and a half years in the role, on 8 November 2020 Mézec resigned from his role as the Minister of Children and Housing in support of a vote of no confidence against the Chief Minister, and subsequently the party organised into a parliamentary 'Opposition' block and allocated their members policy portfolios.

In the 2022 general election the party won 10 seats, doubling the seat count of its prior highest electoral performance and becoming the largest political party in the States Assembly.

In January 2024, the Moore government, led by the Better Way movement, was ousted by Reform Jersey and a group of independents in a vote of no confidence. This led to a new government led by Chief Minister Lyndon Farnham. Sam Mézec became Minister for Housing, Carina Alves became Assistant Chief Minister, Lyndsay Feltham became Minister for Social Security and Robert Ward became Minister for Education.

On 2 April 2026, it was announced in the Jersey Evening Post that Deputy Montfort Tadier would be seeking a sixth term in the States Assembly, again representing St Brelade. It was also revealed that former Environment Minister John Young had joined the party and would be running alongside Deputy Tadier for one of the three St Brelade seats.

Ahead of the 2026 general election, Deputy Geoff Southern announced he would be retiring. Incumbent Deputies Mézec, Tom Coles, Raluca Kovacs, Ward and Catherine Curtis confirmed their intention to stand again with Mézec seeking a Senatorial mandate and Ward running for Connétable of St Helier.

At the 2026 Jersey general election, Reform Jersey won seven seats in the States Assembly, down from ten in 2022. The party retained seats in St Helier South, St Helier Central and St Brelade, but lost representation in St Saviour and failed to win an island-wide Senator seat. Mézec finished tenth in the Senator election, with the top nine candidates elected, while Ward was defeated by Inna Gardiner in the election for Connétable of St Helier.

=== Policy and legislation ===
Reform Jersey politicians have successfully introduced cheaper bus travel for under-18s and extended free GP care in Jersey to cover all students in full-time education. This followed a successful amendment to the Government Plan in 2022 which extended free GP visits to all children up to 17 years.

In 2025, Reform Jersey raised the minimum wage in Jersey to £13.59 an hour, with the eventual goal to have the minimum wage in line with Jersey's living wage.

Before the 7 June 2026 election, Reform Jersey successfully changed Jersey's Residential Tenancy Law, which outlawed revenge evictions and protecting tenants against excessive rent increases. In the same year, Reform Jersey extended access to healthcare for pensioners with low savings as well as increasing the 'Christmas bonus' amount for all pensioners.

== Ideology and platform ==
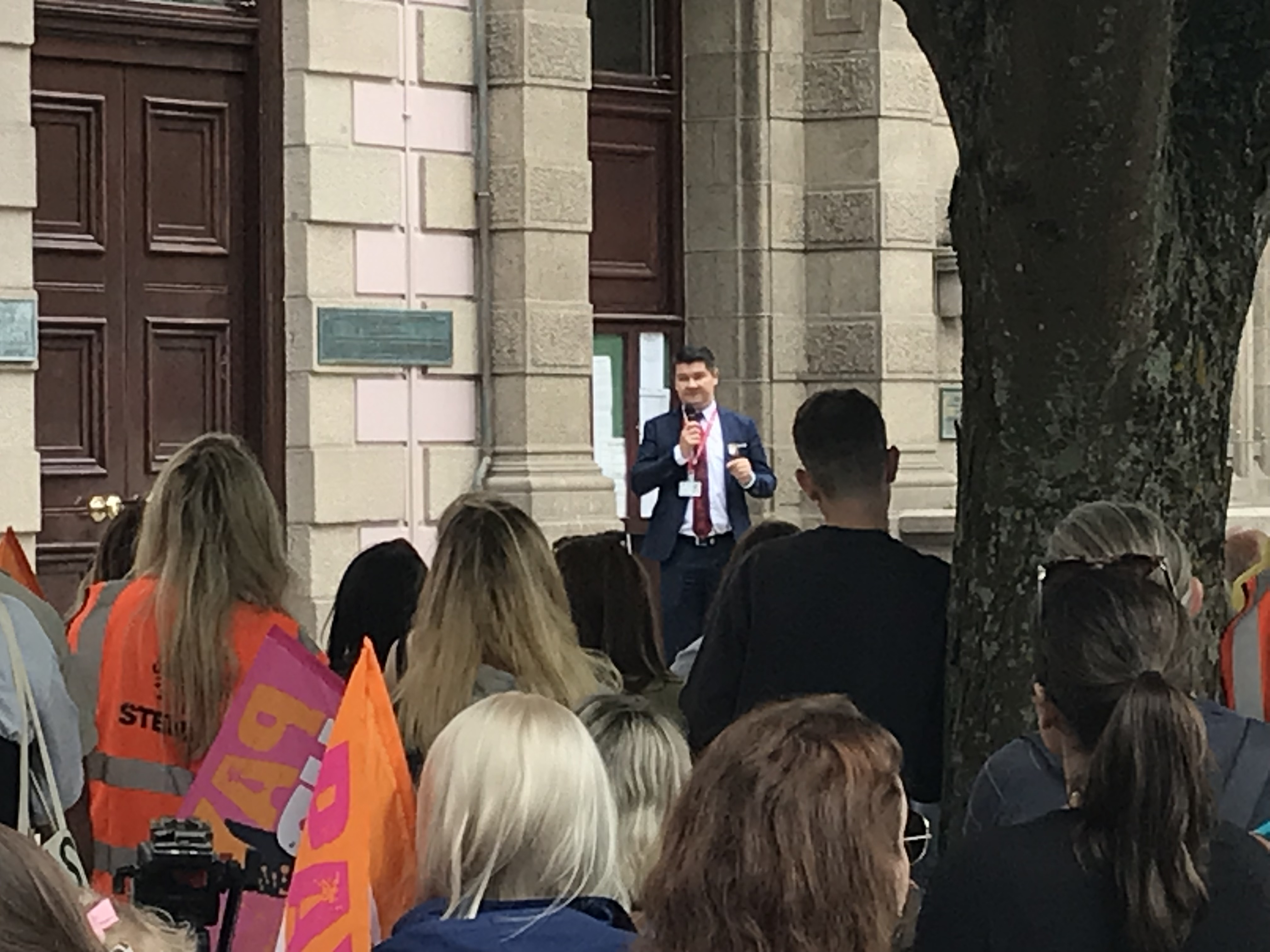
Reform is a supporter of trade unions.

The party states its support for a living wage, progressive taxation, 26 weeks' statutory maternity leave, construction of affordable housing, and democratic reform of the States of Jersey and the parish system. Their 2018 campaign, included the message, ‘improving the standard of living’.

The party's 2018 election manifesto, Working For A Fairer Island, promised tax reform, grants to cover the cost of university tuition fees, a rent freeze on the social housing sector, an empty property tax, and electoral reform of the States of Jersey to introduce one type of States member elected in equal-size constituencies. It also expressed support for a universal healthcare system, free at the point of use, and promised to reduce the cost of GP visits.

The 2018 manifesto also supported the conservation of Jèrriais. In 2019, Deputy Montford Tadier successfully proposed that Jèrriais become an official language of the States Assembly, alongside English and French. Later in 2020, Tadier allocated £1.5 million for the preservation of the Jèrriais language in Jersey.

Reform Jersey supported and campaigned for the legalisation of same-sex marriage and organised a rally in support of equal marriage on 12 July 2014, prior to the legalisation of same-sex marriage in Jersey on 1 July 2018.

The party supports environmental activism. On 30 April, 2019, party chairman Mézec addressed a rally of local Extinction Rebellion activists in the Royal Square. On 2 May 2019, during a debate in the States Assembly, Deputy Montfort Tadier called for “ecological socialism” in response to anthropogenic climate change.

Reform Jersey’s “New Deal for Jersey”, first published on 1 June 2020 and inspired by both the New Deal of Franklin D. Roosevelt and contemporary proposals for a Green New Deal, calls for free access to primary healthcare, extended rent freezes, reduction of the qualifying period for unfair dismissal, and continuing income support and debt write-offs for low-income islanders.

== Electoral performance ==
States Assembly
| Election | Leader | Total votes | Seats | | | Position | Government |
| Election | Leader | No. | No. | ± | Share | Position | Government |
|---|---|---|---|---|---|---|---|
| 2014 | Sam Mézec | 7,910 | 3 / 49 | Steady | 6.1 | 1st | Independent |
| 2018 | Sam Mézec | 19,984 | 5 / 49 | ▲2 | 10.2 | 1st | Independent–Reform Jersey |
| 2022 | Sam Mézec | 12,751 | 10 / 49 | ▲5 | 20.4 | 1st | Independent–Better Way–JLC |
| 2026 | Sam Mézec | | 7 / 49 | ▼3 | 14.3 | 1st | TBD |

== Current members of the States Assembly ==
Seven Reform Jersey members were elected to the States Assembly in the 2026 general election, all to the position of deputy.

| Member | Constituency | First elected | Notes |
|---|---|---|---|
| Carina Alves | St Helier Central | 2018 | |
| Lee Carpenter | St Helier Central | 2026 | |
| Tom Coles | St Helier South | 2022 | |
| Catherine Curtis | St Helier Central | 2022 | |
| Lyndsay Feltham | St Helier Central | 2022 | Deputy Leader |
| Beatriz Porée | St Helier South | 2022 | |
| Montfort Tadier | St Brelade | 2008 | Previously a member of Time4Change, joined Reform in 2014 |

== See also ==
- Political parties in Jersey
- Politics of Jersey
- Constitution of Jersey
