= Inna Gardiner =

Jersey politician

Connétable of St Helier
- Incumbent
- Assumed office 12 June 2026
- Preceded by: Simon Crowcroft

Minister for Children and Education
- In office 11 July 2022 – 30 January 2024

Deputy for St Helier North
- In office 27 June 2022 – 12 June 2026

Deputy for St Helier No. 3 and 4
- In office 1 March 2019 – 27 June 2022

Personal details
- Party: Independent

Inna Gardiner is a Jersey politician who was elected Connétable of St Helier in 2026. An independent, she has been a member of the States Assembly since 2019, serving as a Deputy until 2026. She was Minister for Children and Education from July 2022 to January 2024.

== Early life and career ==
Gardiner grew up in Kazakhstan during the final years of the Soviet Union. She studied social work at university and worked as a youth worker while a student. After graduating, she worked in education for eight years and later spent around 20 years as a self-employed management consultant, working with educational institutions and international businesses.

== Political career ==
Gardiner stood unsuccessfully for election as a Deputy of St Helier District Nos. 3 and 4 in the 2018 Jersey general election, finishing fifth in the four-seat constituency. She was elected for the district in a February 2019 by-election following the death of Deputy Richard Rondel, receiving 391 votes.

In October 2020, Gardiner was appointed chair of the States Assembly's Public Accounts Committee. At the 2022 Jersey general election, she was elected as one of the four Deputies for the newly created St Helier North constituency, topping the poll with 1,665 votes.

On 11 July 2022, Gardiner was elected Minister for Children and Education in the administration of Chief Minister Kristina Moore. She remained in office until the change of government in January 2024. In February 2024, she returned to scrutiny as chair of the Public Accounts Committee and was elected president of the Scrutiny Liaison Committee, commonly referred to as “Chief Scrutineer".

Gardiner stood for Connétable of St Helier in the 2026 Jersey general election. She became the first woman Connétable of St Helier.
