= John Le Fondré =

Chief Minister of Jersey (2018–2022)

Chief Minister of Jersey
- In office 7 June 2018 – 12 July 2022
- Monarch: Elizabeth II
- Lieutenant Governor: Sir Stephen Dalton
- Preceded by: Ian Gorst
- Succeeded by: Kristina Moore

Senator
- In office 16 May 2018 – 22 June 2022

Deputy for Saint Lawrence
- In office 5 December 2005 – 16 May 2018

Personal details
- Born: John Alexander Nicholas Le Fondré Jersey, Channel Islands
- Party: Independent (2005-2021); Jersey Alliance (2021-present)

John Alexander Nicholas Le Fondré is a Jersey politician who was the fourth Chief Minister of Jersey. He entered the States Assembly in 2005 as deputy for the Parish of St Lawrence, and was re-elected to this position in 2011 and 2014. During his time as deputy he served in various roles in scrutiny and as an Assistant Minister.

At the 2018 general election, he was elected as a Senator, and subsequently defeated incumbent Ian Gorst for the position of Chief Minister. While Chief Minister, Le Fondré led the island's response to the COVID-19 pandemic. In the 2022 general election, after serving one term as Chief Minister, Le Fondré lost his membership of the States.

He unsuccessfully stood as an independent candidate for Connétable of St Lawrence at the 2026 Jersey general election.

== Early life and education ==
John Alexander Nicholas Le Fondré is the son of the late Deputy John Le Fondré Snr., after whom the Jersey Airport departures hall is named.

He was educated at Victoria College, and went to Kingston Polytechnic to read Accounting and Finance. This included four months at the business school in Montpellier, France, where he became fluent in French. He graduated with an Upper Second Class Honours and went to work for Ernst and Young, both in Jersey and Luxembourg.

His family has owned El Tico, in St Ouen, now a restaurant, for generations.

He is a chartered accountant, and a member of the Institute of Chartered Accountants in England & Wales (UK) and a member of the Information Systems Audit and Control Association (USA).

== Political career ==
He has taken a keen interest in parish affairs, acting as treasurer to the St Lawrence Battle of Flowers Association from 2001 – 2005, and also treasurer to the St Lawrence Parish Magazine – Les Laurentins from 2003 to the present.

He was a Committee Member of the St Lawrence Millennium Committee, and in that capacity also acted as Project Manager for the St Lawrence Millennium Footpath Project (1997 – 2004), also writing and summarising much of the written information on display about the path on the information boards and individual signs, as well as working on the completion of the path itself.

Elected to the States initially in 2005, he was originally the Deputy of St Lawrence, when he took on several roles such as Assistant Minister to the Chief Minister, Treasury and Transport and Technical Services.

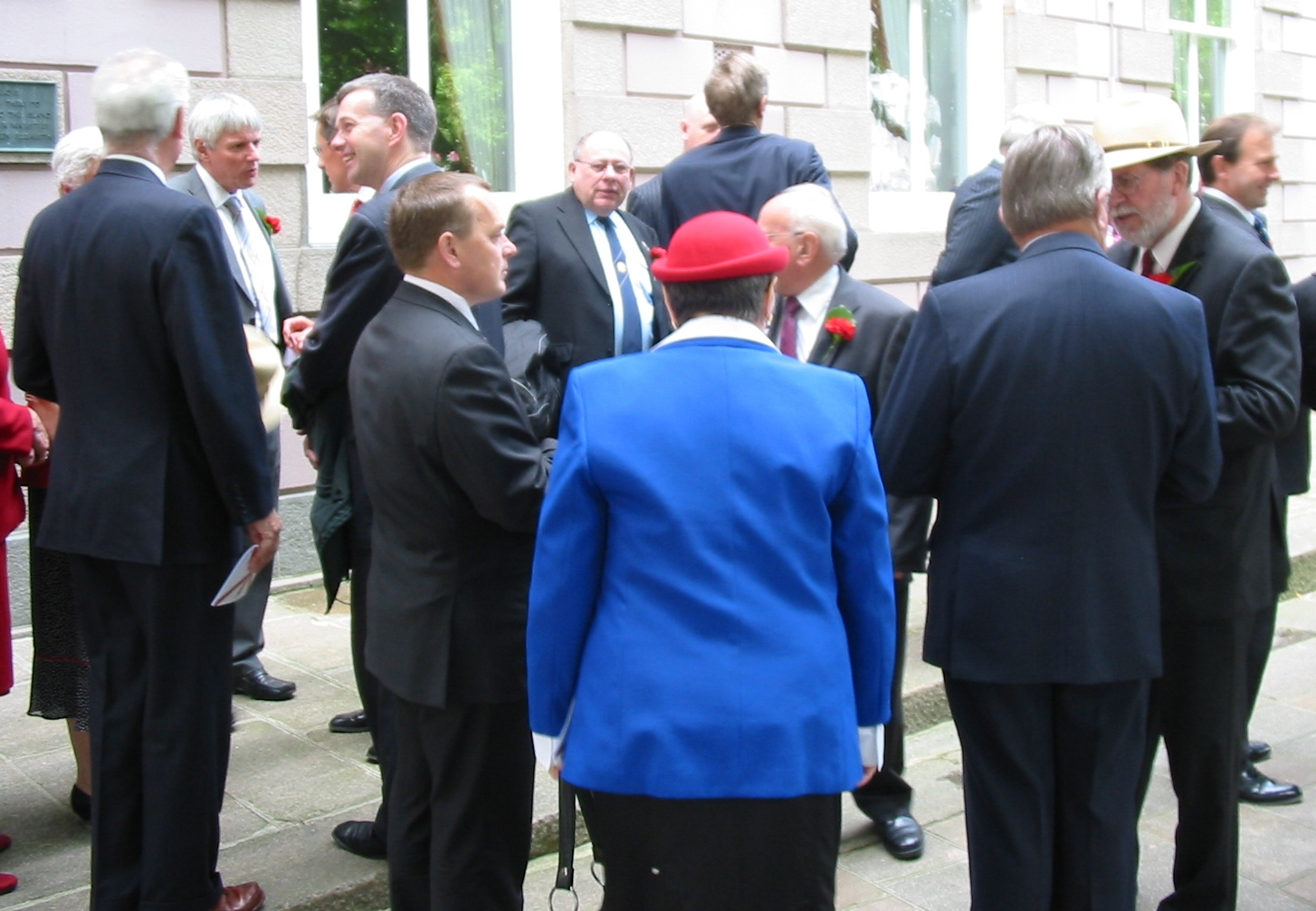
Le Fondré pictured at the Liberation Day celebrations in 2009

In 2014, he began to work in Scrutiny panels, focusing on numerous projects such as Brexit and the Future Hospital. He also represented the island in the Assemblée Parlementaire de la Francophonie and the British-Irish Parliamentary Assembly.

His political achievements include support the dairy industry through the Howard Davis Farm, making social housing rents "flexible" (up to 90% of market rates rather than at 90%), single-day elections and exempting food from GST.

While same-sex marriage was being debated in the States Assembly, Le Fondré aided in producing a 'tolerance clause' which would have allowed businesses to decline to serve same-sex or trans couples for religious reasons, however this proposal was rejected.

In the 2018 Island election, Le Fondré was elected as a Senator on an island-wide basis with 14,204 votes, putting him in third place. 30 states members, including those from the Reform Jersey, supported his bid to become Chief Minister.

== Premiership ==
Le Fondré's time as Chief Minister has been marked by the COVID-19 pandemic in 2020 and 2021. On 12 March, his advice was to maintain a semblance of normal life, including continuing to go on holidays off-island, but by 14 March his advice changed, requesting over-65s to start social distancing, and on 20 March he extended this advice to islanders of all ages.

On 26 March, the Chief Minister called for young people to heed the social distancing advice for the sake of their family members, and bemoaned the spread of unhelpful rumours by conspiracy theorists over social media.

On the evening of 29 March, the Chief Minister announced a lockdown, effective from 8 am the following morning. Islanders were required to stay at home other than for short periods for specific purposes unless they were employed in an essential function.

On 27 April the Chief Minister revealed that nine of those that had died had done so at the General Hospital, two at St Saviour's Hospital (a facility where mental illness is treated), seven in care homes and the other in their own home. Most were aged in their 70s, 80s or 90s.

Le Fondré faced a vote of no confidence that was lodged by Senator Kristina Moore in November 2021 to remove Le Fondré as Chief Minister. The motion was initiated in response to Le Fondré improperly allowing the government's Chief Executive, Charlie Parker, to take a second job in a UK real estate firm without the written approval of the States Employment Board. Moore also cited the Chief Minister's inability to address the issue of healthcare, lack of population policy and the ongoing housing crisis as additional reasons for her motion of no confidence. Moore also stated that Le Fondré had lost the support of the public by quoting a statistic that showed that public support for the government had fallen to 37%. A number of members from the Council of Ministers resigned from government in order to support the motion, including Sam Mezec, Steve Pallett and Montfort Tadier. Despite initial polls suggesting a close vote, Le Fondré won the vote of no confidence by 29 to 19 votes. Charlie Parker resigned as the government's Chief Executive during the motion of no confidence and was given a £500,000 severance pay-off, despite Le Fondré giving the assurance that there would be "no additional payouts beyond his contractual entitlement".

After a spike in new cases, on 30 November the Chief Minister announced that face masks would be compulsory in shops, supermarkets, banks, on buses and in taxis, in health care settings, at hairdressers and at beauticians. People should work from home where possible. Those over 70 years old should avoid indoor contact with people from outside their household.

The restrictions were increased three days later, with all pubs, bars, restaurants, gyms and fitness classes ordered to close within 24 hours, two metre social distancing is also reinstated with an expectation that these restrictions would continue until after New Year.

In July 2021, Le Fondré joined the newly formed Jersey Alliance party.

== Post-premiership ==
At the 2022 Jersey general election, Le Fondré stood as a Jersey Alliance candidate in St Lawrence, St John and Trinity, but lost his seat in the States Assembly. ITV News reported that he was the first sitting Chief Minister to be voted out of the States. Kristina Moore was later elected as Chief Minister by the new Assembly.

At the 2026 Jersey general election, Le Fondré stood as an independent candidate for Connétable of St Lawrence. He was defeated by Tina Palmer, receiving 608 votes to Palmer's 1,151.

== Voluntary work and sport ==
He is a qualified RYA dinghy instructor and has assisted with teaching youngsters to sail in connection with the Royal Channel Island Yacht Club.

Le Fondré represented Victoria College, the Parish of St Lawrence, and the Island of Jersey in target shooting.

Political offices
Preceded by Ian Gorst	Chief Minister of Jersey; 2018–2022	Succeeded by Kristina Moore
