= Lyndsay Feltham =

Jersey politician and Deputy Leader of Reform Jersey

Deputy Lyndsay Feltham
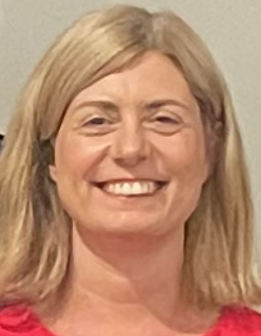
- Feltham in 2024

Deputy Leader of Reform Jersey
- Incumbent
- Assumed office 17 November 2023
- Leader: Sam Mézec
- Preceded by: Position established

Minister for Social Security
- Incumbent
- Assumed office February 2024
- Preceded by: Elaine Millar

Chair of the Public Accounts Committee
- Incumbent
- Assumed office 12 July 2022
- Preceded by: Inna Gardiner

Deputy of St Helier Central
- Incumbent
- Assumed office 27 June 2022
- Serving with: Carina Alves; Catherine Curtis; Lee Carpenter
- Majority: 170

Chairperson of Reform Jersey
- In office 20 June 2019 – 10 August 2022
- Preceded by: Sam Mézec
- Succeeded by: Helen Evans

Personal details
- Party: Reform Jersey

Lyndsay Feltham is a Jersey politician serving in the States Assembly as Deputy of St Helier Central since 2022. She is a former Minister for Social Security.

== Early years ==
Feltham was born and raised in Jersey, and lived in Western Australia for 11 years.

== Political career ==
Feltham was chairperson of Reform Jersey from 2019 to 2022. She resigned as the party's chairperson a few months later in line with its constitution, which prevent members of the States Assembly from holding the position. In November 2023, she was appointed to the newly created position of deputy leader of Reform Jersey.

In February 2024 until the 2026 general election, Feltham was Minister for Social Security in Chief Minister Lyndon Farnham’s first Council of Ministers. In 2025, Feltham raised the minimum wage in Jersey to £13.59 an hour, with the eventual goal to have the minimum wage in line with Jersey's living wage.

She was re-elected as a Deputy for St Helier Central at the 2026 Jersey general election. She currently serves as chair of the Corporate Services Scrutiny Panel.

In July 2026, following a tied party leadership election, Feltham became interim co-leader of Reform Jersey alongside Montfort Tadier, pending a further election.
