= Minister for Social Security =

Minister of Social Security or Minister for Social Security may refer to:

- The Minister of Social Security in the Government of the United Kingdom, 1966–1968: Ministry of Social Security (United Kingdom)#Ministers
- Minister of State for Social Security in the Government of the United Kingdom: see Secretary of State for Work and Pensions
- Minister for Social Security (Sweden)
