= 2014 Jersey by-elections =

By-elections for Deputies to the States of Jersey were held on 5 March 2014.

== Background ==
Trevor Pitman and Shona Pitman lost their seats in January 2014 after being declared bankrupt. This resulted in a by-election, on 5 March 2014, for Deputy of St Helier No. 1 and St Helier No. 2 districts.

== Results ==
=== St Helier No. 1 ===
St. Helier No. 1 by-election, 2014
Party	Candidate	Votes	%	±%
Independent	Nick Le Cornu	248	33.2	+1.2%
Independent	Gordon Forrest	201	26.9	+26.9%
Independent	Paul Le Claire	178	23.8	−15%
Independent	Roy Travert	70	9.4	+9.4%
Independent	Maureen Morgan	51	6.8	+6.8%
Majority				
Turnout		748		
Independent hold		Swing		

=== St Helier No. 2 ===
St. Helier No. 2 by-election, 2014
Party	Candidate	Votes	%	±%
Reform Jersey	Sam Mézec	277	52.5	+52.5%
Independent	Ian Philpott	99	18.8	+18.8%
Independent	Bernard Manning	87	16.5	+0.5%
Independent	Paul Huelin	65	12.3	+12.3%
Majority				
Turnout		528		
Reform Jersey gain from Independent		Swing		

== See also ==
- Elections in Jersey
- Political parties in Jersey
- Politics of Jersey
- Constitution of Jersey
