= Lee Carpenter =

Canadian ice hockey player (born 1949)

- Born: May 14, 1949 (age 75); Toronto, Ontario, Canada
- Height: 178 cm (5 ft 10 in)
- Weight: 82 kg (181 lb; 12 st 13 lb)
- Position: Defenceman
- Played for: Hamilton Red Wings; Fort Worth Wings; Tidewater Wings; Virginia Wings
- NHL draft: 18th overall, 1966; Detroit Red Wings
- Playing career: 1970–1974

Lee Carpenter (born May 14, 1949) was a Canadian ice hockey defenceman who played in 211 games in the American Hockey League for the Tidewater Wings and Virginia Wings. Carpenter was drafted by the Detroit Red Wings in the 3rd round, 18th overall, of the 1966 NHL Amateur Draft.

== See also ==
List of Detroit Red Wings draft picks
