= Sam Mézec =

Jersey politician

Deputy Sam Mézec
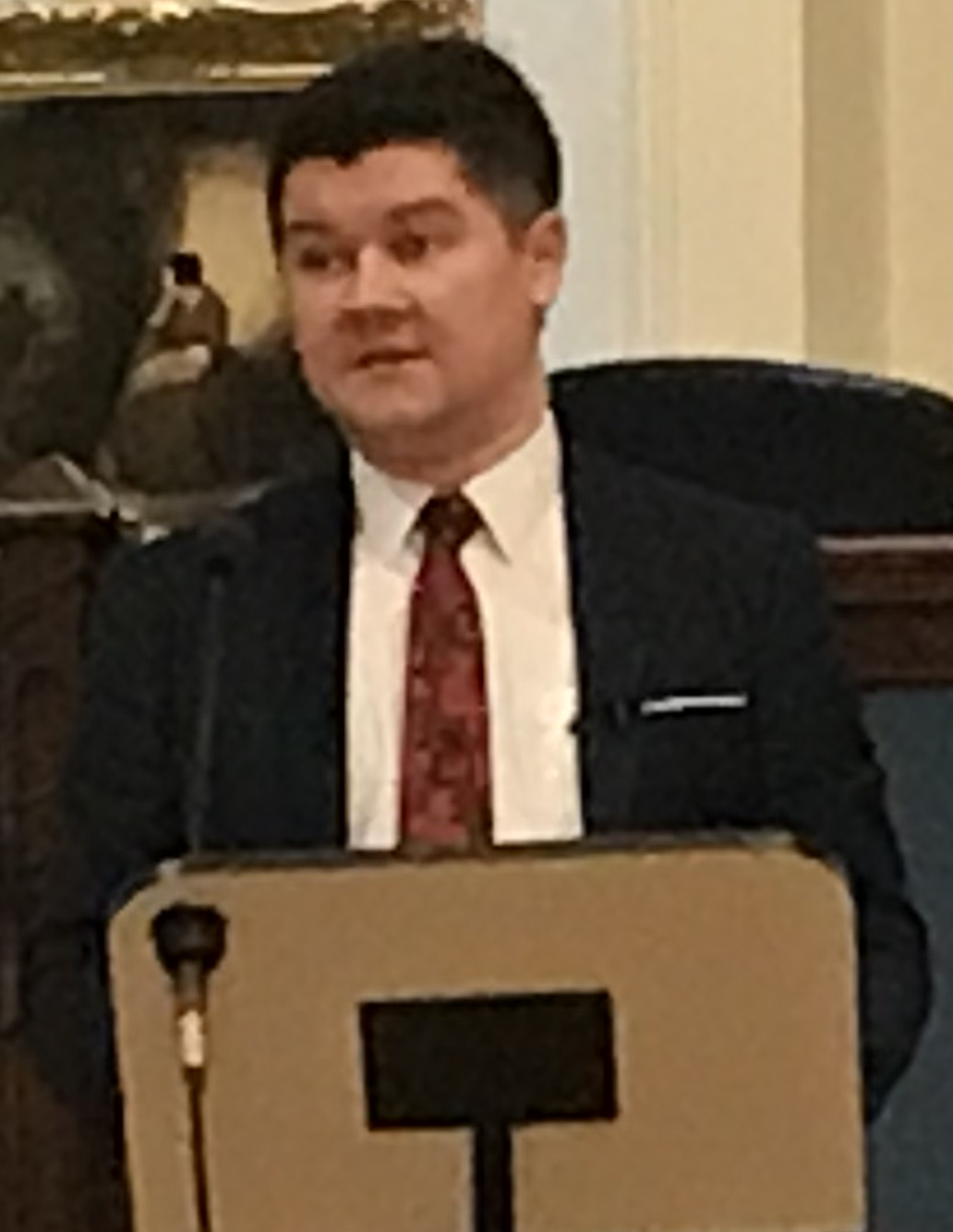
- Mézec in 2024

Leader of Reform Jersey
- Incumbent
- Assumed office 4 July 2014
- Deputy Leader: Lyndsay Feltham
- Preceded by: Position established

Minister for Housing and Communities
- Incumbent
- Assumed office 30 January 2024
- Chief Minister: Lyndon Farnham
- Preceded by: David Warr

Deputy of St Helier South
- Incumbent
- Assumed office 27 June 2022
- Serving with: Tom Coles; Beatriz Porée; David Warr
- Majority: 364

Chief Scrutineer
- In office 19 July 2022 – 30 January 2024
- Chief Minister: Kristina Moore
- Preceded by: Kristina Moore

Minister for Children & Housing
- In office 3 July 2018 – 17 June 2022
- Chief Minister: John Le Fondré
- Preceded by: Anne Pryke (as Housing Minister)
- Succeeded by: Jeremy Maçon

Personal details
- Born: 26 December 1990 (age 35) Jersey
- Party: Reform Jersey
- Occupation: Politician
- Website: www.reformjersey.je

Samuel Yves Mézec (born 26 December 1990) is a Jersey politician who served as a member of the States Assembly from 2014 to 2026, first as a Deputy, then as a Senator and subsequently again as a Deputy. He held ministerial office as Minister for Children and Housing from 2018 to 2020 and as Minister for Housing and Communities from 2024 to 2026. He led Reform Jersey from 2019 to 2026.

== Political career ==
Mézec was elected as the Deputy for the St. Helier No. 2 district after winning that seat in a by-election on 5 March 2014. He held the seat in the general election held later that year on 15 October.

He co-founded and, until June 2019, was the Chairman of Reform Jersey, one of the island's political parties. He stood in the Senatorial by-election held on 7 September 2016 but came second to Sarah Ferguson.

Mézec was elected as Senator in the 2018 general election with 40.8% of the popular vote, and on 3 July 2018, he was the first politician to take on the combined role of Minister of Children and Housing.

After two and a half years in government, on 8 November 2020 Mézec resigned from his Ministerial role to support a vote of no confidence against the Chief Minister, Senator John Le Fondré.

For the 2022 general election, the position of Senator was abolished and all candidates stood as Deputies or Constables, meaning Mézec would be running again for his previous role as a Deputy. Electoral reforms introduced that year also saw Jersey's constituencies changed, with Mézec's local district now being called 'St Helier South' instead of 'St Helier No. 2'. He was re-elected, along with nine other Reform Jersey members.

Following the party's election success, Deputy Mézec challenged Kristina Moore for the role of Chief Minister, but he was defeated by 39 votes to 10. He was later elected to Deputy Moore's previous role leading the island's Scrutiny function as the Chairman of the Corporate Services Scrutiny Panel.

In January 2024, the Moore government, led by the Better Way movement, was ousted by Reform Jersey and a group of independents in a vote of no confidence. This led to a new government with Lyndon Farnham as Chief Minister and Sam Mézec as Minister for Housing and Communities.

Mezec lost his seat in the States Assembley at the 2026 General Election after finishing tenth in the election for Senator. He later said it would be the job of "new leadership" to take Reform Jersey forward.
