= David Johnson (Jersey politician) =

Jersey solicitor

Connétable of St Mary
- Incumbent
- Assumed office 2022

Deputy for St Mary
- In office 2014–2022

Personal details
- Party: Independent
- Profession: Solicitor

David Johnson is a Jersey politician and solicitor who has served in the States Assembly since 2014. An independent, he represented St Mary as a deputy from 2014 to 2022 and has served as the parish's Connétable since 2022.

== Career ==
Johnson worked as a solicitor for more than 40 years before entering politics. He was first elected as deputy for St Mary in 2014 and was re-elected in 2018.

During his time in the States Assembly, Johnson's work has focused principally on scrutiny. Johnson chaired the Environment, Housing and Infrastructure Scrutiny Panel from 2016 to 2018. In January 2021, he became chair of the Economic and International Affairs Scrutiny Panel, having previously served as its vice-chair. The panel's work included scrutiny of matters relating to Brexit, financial support for businesses and employment legislation.

He has also served on the Legislation Advisory Panel, including as chair from 2018 to 2024. Johnson has supported the creation of a Jersey Public Services Ombudsperson, describing the launch of a 2019 public consultation on the proposal as “an important step towards improving openness and transparency in government”.

Johnson was elected Connétable of St Mary in 2022. He was re-elected at the 2026 general election, receiving 406 votes.
