= Montfort Tadier =

Jersey politician (born 1979)

Deputy Montfort Tadier
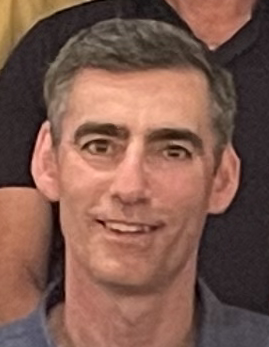
- Tadier in 2024

Deputy of St Brelade
- Incumbent
- Assumed office 27 June 2022 Serving with Helen Miles (Jersey), Moz Scott, Jonathan Renouf
- Chief Minister: Kristina Moore (2022-2024) Lyndon Farnham (2024-)

Deputy of St Brelade No. 2
- In office November 2008 – June 2022
- Chief Minister: Terry Le Sueur (2008-2011) Ian Gorst (2011-2018) John Le Fondré (2018-2022)

Personal details
- Born: 28 November 1979 (age 46) Jersey
- Party: Reform Jersey
- Other political affiliations: Independent (2008–2014)
- Website: http://www.mtadier.blogspot.com/

Montfort Tadier (born 28 November 1979) is a Jersey politician, a founding member of Reform Jersey, and a member of the States of Jersey.

== Early life and education ==
Montfort Tadier was born in the parish of St Helier in Jersey.

He was brought up in St Brelade and educated in the island at La Moye Primary School, Les Quennevais and Hautlieu Secondary Schools, before gaining a BA(Hons) in Modern Languages from the University of Sheffield.

== Political career ==
He was first elected in November 2008 as Deputy for the district of St Brelade No. 2, which consists of the vingtaines of La Moye and Les Quennevais. He gained one of the two seats in the district, coming second with 758 votes from a field of 8 candidates. He was re-elected in 2011 with a majority of 1,428 votes.

Though the Jersey government does not operate a formal system of party politics (the vast majority of members having been elected as independents), he identifies himself with green, social-democratic and socialist politics.

He was a founding member of the political pressure group Time4Change, which was formed in the response to the revelations, in early 2008, that systemic child abuse had occurred in a local care home during the 1960s–1980s. The group campaigned on various issues to do with constitutional reform, tax reform, social and environmental issues.

In December 2010 Deputy Montfort Tadier announced the possible formation of a new political party called Reform Jersey, However it was not until July 2014 that Reform Jersey was registered in the Royal Court of Jersey.

He has served on the Education and Home Affairs Scrutiny Panel between 2008 – 2013 and is currently the vice-chairman of the Privileges and Procedures Committee.

Montfort Tadier was re-elected during the 2018 electoral campaign as Deputy for St Brelade District No. 2.

After the 2018 election Deputy Montfort Tadier was suspended from ministerial duties on 29 March 2019 because "the evening of 28 March, the Assistant Minister for Economic Development, Tourism, Sport and Culture (Deputy Montfort Tadier), sent an email to a number of States Members, calling for a Government employee to be “removed from States Employment” and suggesting that a number of Members “back a proposition to this effect”. The Deputy copied the named employee into this email and was subsequently deemed have broken the Ministerial Code of Conduct by the Chief Minister, Senator John Le Fondré.

In 2019, Tadier successfully proposed that Jèrriais become an official language of L's Êtats d'Jèrri, alongside English and French. Later in 2020, Tadier allocated £1.5 million for the preservation of the Jèrriais language in Jersey.

Tadier was elected to the new constituency of St Brelade in June 2022 with 1,503 votes, gaining one of the four Deputy seats available. During this term, he has served as President of Assemblée Parlementaire de la Francophonie, Member of Commonwealth Parliamentary Association (Jersey Branch) Executive Committee, Member of Constituency Offices Sub-Committee, Chair of Economic and International Affairs Scrutiny Panel, Member of Scrutiny Liaison Committee, Member of Political Awareness and Education Sub-Committee and Member of Privileges and Procedure Committee.

Tadier's intention to stand for re-election to one of the three St Brelade Deputy seats was confirmed in the Jersey Evening Post on Thursday 2 April 2026. It was also revealed that he would be joined by former Environment Minister John Young who would be standing for election after a four-year break from politics, this time as a member of Reform Jersey.
