= Ian Gorst =

Jersey politician (born 1969)

Deputy Ian Gorst
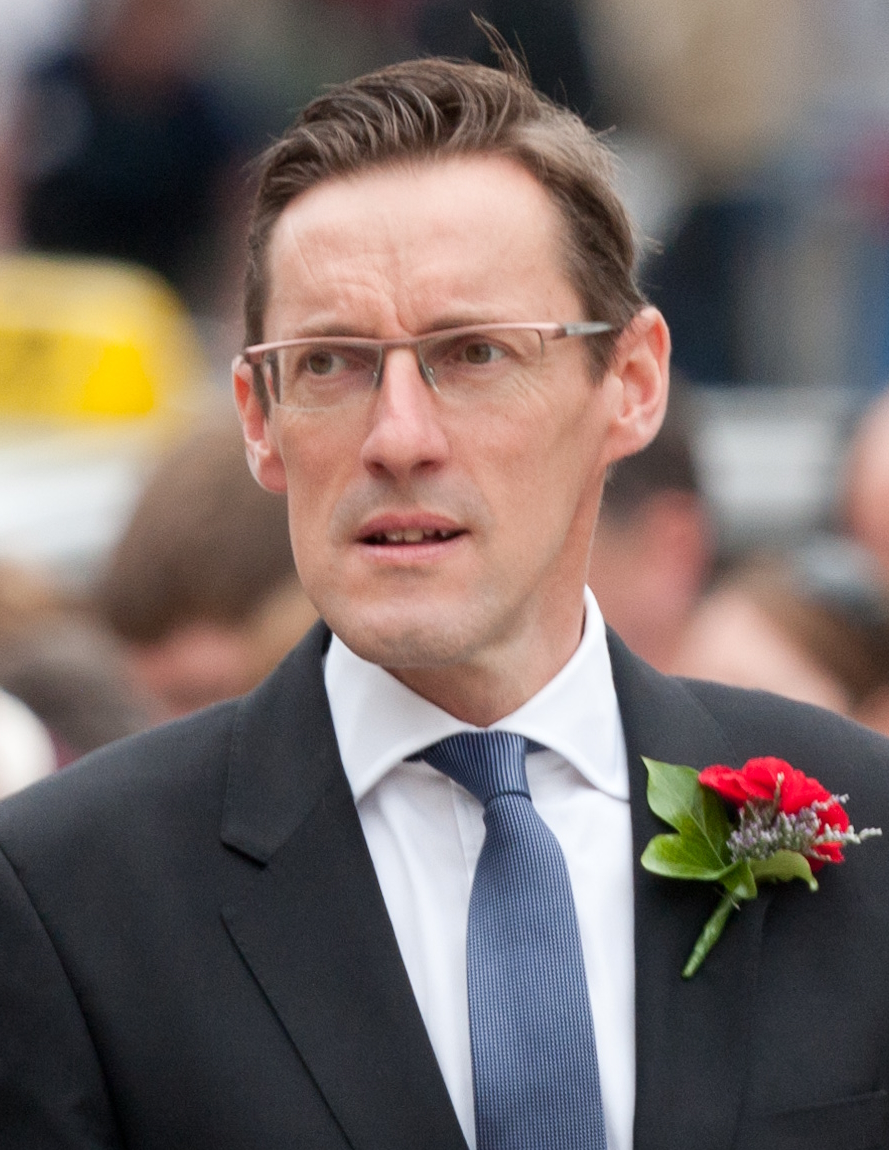

Minister for External Relations
- Incumbent
- Assumed office 30 January 2024
- Chief Minister: Lyndon Farnham
- Preceded by: Philip Ozouf
- In office 7 June 2018 – 12 July 2022
- Chief Minister: John Le Fondré
- Preceded by: Philip Bailhache
- Succeeded by: Philip Ozouf

Minister for Treasury and Resources
- In office 12 July 2022 – 30 January 2024
- Chief Minister: Kristina Moore
- Preceded by: Susan Pinel

Chief Minister of Jersey
- In office 14 November 2011 – 7 June 2018
- Monarch: Elizabeth II
- Preceded by: Terry le Sueur
- Succeeded by: John Le Fondré
Positions within the States Assembly
Deputy for St Mary, St Ouen and St Peter
Incumbent
Assumed office
27 June 2022
Serving with Kristina Moore
Lyndon Farnham
Lucy Stephenson
Senator
In office
14 November 2011 – 27 June 2022
Deputy for Saint Clement
In office
5 December 2005 – 14 November 2011
Serving with Gerard Baudains
Anne Dupré

Personal details
- Born: 15 December 1969 (age 56) Lancaster, England
- Party: Independent
- Spouse: Dionne A'Court
- Children: 2 daughters

Ian Joseph Gorst (born 15 December 1969) is a Jersey politician who has been a Deputy for St Mary, St Ouen and St Peter and Minister for Treasury and Resources since 2022.

Gorst was first elected to the States Assembly in the 2005 general election as a Deputy for St Clement. In November 2011, after his successful election as a Senator, Gorst was appointed Chief Minister by the Assembly. He served two terms as Chief Minister until he was beaten in a vote against John Le Fondré after the 2018 general election. From 2018 to 2022 he served as Minister for External Relations.

Born in Lancaster, England, Gorst worked as an accountant before going into politics after moving to Jersey.

== Background ==
Gorst was born into a farming family in the Lune Valley, Lancashire, England, and left school with A-levels in history and business studies (grade E) and went on to work in insurance before going into banking and accountancy. He was a member of the UK Conservative Party before leaving the United Kingdom. He met his wife Dionne (née A'Court), a Jerseywoman, while she was studying nursing in England, and the couple moved back to Jersey.

== Electoral history ==
Gorst was elected to the States of Jersey as one of the Deputies for St Clement in the 2005 elections, coming second with 930 votes. He was re-elected in 2008 when he topped the poll with 1,112 votes. In the 2011 general election he successfully stood for one of the four Senators' seats, coming second out of 13 candidates.

Gorst was re-elected in the 2014 general election with 14,035 votes (9.6% of the vote share), the highest of any Senatorial candidate.

== States Assembly ==
In 2005, Gorst was appointed as an assistant minister in the Chief Minister's Department, with responsibility for decisions about migration and human resources. In July 2007, Gorst became an assistant minister to the Minister for Treasury and Resources, with responsibilities including the review of accounting functions, investment matters, internal audit and procurement.

Between 2008 and 2011, Gorst was Minister for Employment and Social Security in the Council of Ministers. During his period of office, a system for redundancy payments was introduced, the income support system was criticized, state pension retirement age was raised from 65 to 67; and a new system for funding care in old age was put in place.

He was elected Chief Minister of Jersey in November 2011 and became the first Chief Minister to serve for two terms. He was succeeded by John Le Fondré in June 2018, when the new Chief Minister appointed Senator Gorst as the Minister for External Relations, a role he has taken over from Sir Philip Bailhache.

Gorst has served as chairman of the Jersey Overseas Aid Commission.

== Voluntary work ==
Gorst is the deputy chair of governors at Le Rocquier School, and a member of the National Society for the Prevention of Cruelty to Children Pathways steering group.

Political offices
Preceded by Terry Le Sueur	Chief Minister of Jersey; 2011–2018	Succeeded by John Le Fondré
Preceded by Philip Bailhache	Minister for External Relations; 2018–2022	Succeeded by Philip Ozouf
Preceded by Susan Pinel	Minister for Treasury and Resources; 2022–present	Incumbent
