= Kristina Moore =

Jersey politician and former Chief Minister (2022-2024)

Deputy Kristina Moore
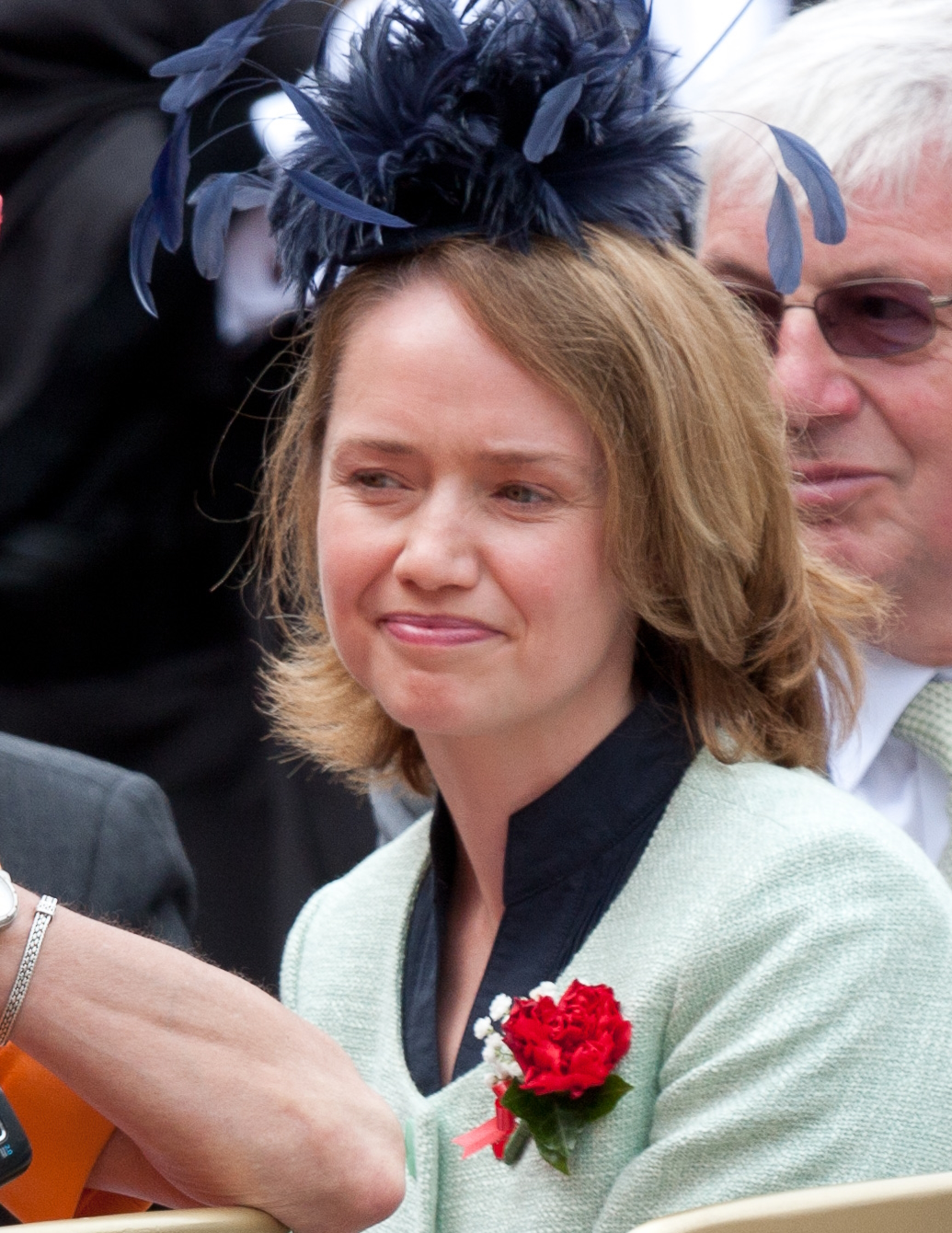

Deputy for St Mary, St Ouen and St Peter
- Incumbent
- Assumed office 27 June 2022
- Serving with: Lucy Stephenson; Ian Gorst; Lyndon Farnham

Chief Minister of Jersey
- In office 11 July 2022 – 30 January 2024
- Monarchs: Elizabeth II; Charles III
- Lieutenant Governor: Sir Timothy Le Cocq (acting); Jerry Kyd
- Preceded by: John Le Fondré
- Succeeded by: Lyndon Farnham

Chair of the Corporate Services Scrutiny Panel
- In office 12 June 2018 – 12 July 2022
- Preceded by: John Le Fondré
- Succeeded by: Sam Mézec

Minister for Home Affairs
- In office 6 November 2014 – 7 June 2018
- Chief Minister: Ian Gorst
- Preceded by: Ian Le Marquand
- Succeeded by: Len Norman

Senator
- In office 1 June 2018 – 17 June 2022

Deputy for Saint Peter
- In office 14 November 2011 – 1 June 2018
- Preceded by: Colin Egré
- Succeeded by: Rowland Heulin

Personal details
- Born: Kristina Louise Moore; 1974 or 1975 (age 50–51)
- Party: Independent
- Spouse: James
- Children: 2 sons

Kristina Louise Moore is a former Jersey politician and journalist who served as the Chief Minister of Jersey from July 2022 to January 2024. She was the first woman to hold the office and the first Chief Minister to lose a vote of no confidence.

== Journalism ==
Before her election to the States Assembly in 2011, Moore spent over ten years working as a broadcast journalist based in the Channel Islands and the UK and presented Channel Television's nightly regional news programme, Channel Report.

After completing a BA in French at the University of Birmingham and a postgraduate diploma in broadcast journalism at Highbury College, Moore worked in news departments for independent local radio stations in the South of England. For a few years, she worked for ITV Central in Nottingham as a reporter and newsreader for Central News East.

In 2000, she joined Channel Television as a news reporter, before going on to replace Jenny Kirk as a main anchor of Channel Report and taking up a role as a political correspondent. She also spent a short period working for BBC Spotlight in the Channel Islands.

== Political career ==
Moore stood for St Peter's sole deputy seat in the 2011 general election for the States Assembly. She was elected on 19 October 2011, defeating Wayne Le Marquand by 1,169 votes to 589.

In her 2011 manifesto, she stated that she would resist any further increases in Jersey's Goods and Services Tax (GST), and would like to see the proposed reduction in the number of States Members carried out by 2014. At this time in 2011, the GST rate was 5%, having been increased from 3% in June 2011.

On 15 October 2014, Moore was re-elected as deputy, defeating Debbie Hardisty by 1,335 votes to 200. Between 2014 and 2018, during Ian Gorst's second term as Chief Minister, she served as Minister for Home Affairs – the minister responsible for public safety, law enforcement, emergency services and immigration. Her Assistant Minister was Deidre Mezbourian, Connétable of Saint Lawrence. One notable law introduced during Moore's tenure was the Sexual Offences (Jersey) Law 2018, which strengthened protections for islanders (particularly children) against sexual offences, and for the first time introduced protection against female genital mutilation.

In 2018, Moore announced that she would stand for senator in the upcoming general election. She was elected senator on 16 May 2018, coming second out of the seventeen candidates standing for the eight senator positions. She received 15,292 votes, only narrowly beaten by Tracey Vallois who received 15,518 votes. In the preceding election for Chief Minister, she supported the incumbent, Senator Ian Gorst, who lost to Senator John Le Fondré. Moore left Government, and took up positions on various scrutiny panels, most prominently as Chair of the Corporate Services Panel and President of the Scrutiny Liaison Committee.

In November 2020, Moore lodged a vote of no confidence in Chief Minister John Le Fondré, over a scandal involving the Government of Jersey Chief Executive Charlie Parker being allowed to take up a non-executive directorship as a second job.

In the 2022 general election she was elected deputy for St. Mary, St. Ouen and St. Peter, after the role of senator was abolished. She was aligned to the Better Way group. On 5 July 2022 she was elected Chief Minister by the States Assembly. She received 39 votes, with Deputy Sam Mézec of Reform Jersey receiving 10 votes. She assumed office on 12 July.

On 16 January 2024, Moore lost a vote of no confidence in the States by 27–22, becoming the first Chief Minister to do so, and the shortest-serving Chief Minister in Jersey's history. Moore was replaced as Chief Minister by Lyndon Farnham and the new Council of Ministers was made up of Reform Jersey and independents who voted in favour of the no confidence vote.

Kristina Moore announced that she would be retiring from Jersey politics and would not be a candidate for the 2026 general election.

Political offices
Preceded by John Le Fondré	Chief Minister of Jersey; 2022–2024	Succeeded by Lyndon Farnham
