= Louise Doublet =

Jersey politician

Deputy Louise Doublet

Deputy of St Saviour
- Incumbent
- Assumed office 3 November 2014

Chair of the Health and Social Security Scrutiny Panel
- In office 6 February 2024 – 19 June 2026

Assistant Minister for Children and Education
- In office 19 July 2022 – 30 January 2024

Assistant Minister for Home Affairs
- In office 19 July 2022 – 5 September 2023

Personal details
- Party: Independent

Louise Doublet is a Jersey politician and former primary-school teacher who has served as a Deputy in the States Assembly since 2014. An independent, she represented St Saviour No. 2 from 2014 to 2022 and has represented St Saviour since 2022. She served as Assistant Minister for Children and Education from 2022 to 2024 and chaired the Health and Social Security Scrutiny Panel from 2024 to 2026.

== Background ==
Before entering politics, Doublet was a primary-school teacher and secretary of the Jersey division of the National Union of Teachers.

== Political career ==
Doublet was first elected as Deputy of St Saviour No. 2 in October 2014 and was re-elected in 2018. Following changes to Jersey's electoral districts, she was elected as one of the Deputies for St Saviour in 2022 and re-elected in 2026.

In 2021, the States Assembly approved a proposition brought by Doublet to remove the mandatory seven-day waiting period for women seeking an abortion in Jersey.

From July 2022 until January 2024, Doublet served as Assistant Minister for Children and Education, with responsibility for early years and families. She also served as Assistant Minister for Home Affairs until September 2023. As an assistant minister, she promoted legislation giving same-sex parents equal legal recognition, including the right for both parents to be named on a child's birth certificate.

In February 2024, Doublet was elected chair of the Health and Social Security Scrutiny Panel, defeating Beatriz Porée by 24 votes to 21. She held the position until the end of the 2022–2026 Assembly and also chaired the Assisted Dying Review Panel, which scrutinised proposals and subsequent legislation for the introduction of assisted dying in Jersey.
