= Lyndon Farnham =

Chief Minister of Jersey since 2024

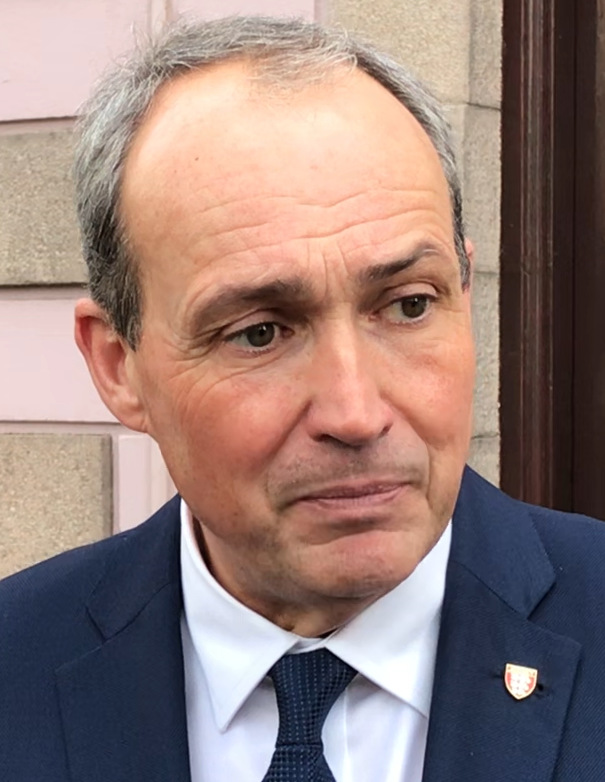
- Farnham in 2024

Chief Minister of Jersey
- Incumbent
- Assumed office 30 January 2024
- Monarch: Charles III
- Lieutenant Governor: Jerry Kyd
- Preceded by: Kristina Moore
- Succeeded by
Ministerial roles
Deputy Chief Minister of Jersey
In office 12 December 2018 – 12 July 2022
| Chief Minister | John Le Fondré |
| Preceded by | Tracey Vallois |
| Succeeded by | Kirsten Morel |
Minister for Economic Development, Tourism, Sport and Culture
In office 6 November 2014 – 12 July 2022
| Chief Minister | Ian Gorst; John Le Fondré |
| Preceded by | Alan Maclean |
| Succeeded by | Kirsten Morel |

Member of the States Assembly
- Incumbent
- Assumed office 2026
- Constituency: Senator (Island-wide)
- In office 2022–2026
- Constituency: Deputy for St Mary, St Ouen, and St Peter
- In office 2011–2022
- Constituency: Senator (Island-wide)
- In office 1999–2005
- Constituency: Deputy for St Saviour No. 2

Personal details
- Born: Lyndon John Farnham Jersey
- Party: Independent
- Website: Official website
- Lyndon Farnham's voice Farnham speaking to reporters after being elected Chief Minister. Recorded 25 January 2024

Lyndon John Farnham is a Jerseyman politician who has served as the Chief Minister of Jersey since January 2024. He formerly served as the Deputy Chief Minister and Minister for Economic Development, Tourism, Sport, and Culture. He has served as a member of the States Assembly since 2014, having previously served from 1999 to 2005.

On 25 January 2024, Farnham was voted Chief Minister-designate by the States Assembly. He became the sixth Chief Minister of Jersey following the appointment of the new Council of Ministers on 30 January.

== Early life ==
Farnham received his early education at St George's Preparatory, Les Quennevais School, and Hautlieu School. He undertook a retail management traineeship at London's renowned Harrods department store from 1982 to 1985.

== Political career ==
He was first elected to the States in 1999 as one of the Deputies for St Saviour's No. 2 District. He was re-elected in 2002 and stood down in 2005.

He returned to the States' chamber in 2011, this time as a Senator, being sworn into office on 14 November that same year. He was re-elected in October 2014, 2018, and 2022.

He was Jersey's Deputy Chief Minister between 2018 and 2022 and Minister for Economic Development, Tourism, Sport and Culture between 2014 and 2022.

== Election results and appointments ==
In 1999 he was elected as Deputy of St Saviour No. 2 district.

In 2002, he was re-elected as Deputy of St Saviour No. 2 district unopposed.

In 2011, he was elected Senator with 11,095, 39.3% of the ballot.

In 2014, he was re-elected as Senator with 10,409, 41.8% of the ballot.

In 2018, he was re-elected as Senator with 12,417, 45.9% of the ballot.

In 2022, he was elected as Deputy of St Mary, St Ouen, and St Peter with 1,101 votes, 29.8% of the ballot.

In 2026, he was elected as Senator with 14,217 votes, 51.4% of the ballot,

=== Ministerial appointments ===
In 2011, he was appointed as Assistant Minister for Home Affairs.

In 2014, he was elected as a Minister for Economic Development, Tourism, Sport, and Culture.

In 2018 he was re-elected as Minister for Economic Development, Tourism, Sport and Culture.

In 2018 he was appointed as Deputy Chief Minister of Jersey.

In 2024 he was appointed as Chief Minister of Jersey.

In 2026 he was re-appointed as Chief Minister of Jersey.

== Electoral reform ==
Farnham led the campaign to retain the office of Senator, supporting Option C in the Jersey electoral reform referendum held on 24 April 2013.

== Campaigns ==
Farnham condemned the hunting in the Faroe Islands of white-sided dolphins. A pod of 1,428 white-sided dolphins were driven into shallow waters at Skálabotnur beach and slaughtered. Farnham stated that he does not want Jersey to engage in diplomatic relations with a nation that allows such brutal practices. He further criticised the Faroese government for permitting this so-called tradition to persist, calling for them to take responsibility and end the practice.

== Business career ==
He is a company director and a past president of the Jersey Hospitality Association, and a former chairman of the Jersey Battle of Flowers Association.

Political offices
| Preceded by Kristina Moore | Chief Minister of Jersey; 2024–present | Incumbent |
