= Same-sex marriage in Jersey =

Same-sex marriage has been legal in Jersey since 1 July 2018. The States Assembly passed a bill 42–1 allowing same-sex couples to marry on 1 February 2018. Royal assent was granted on 23 May 2018, and the law took effect on 1 July. Jersey followed the other Crown Dependencies of the United Kingdom in legalising same-sex marriage, after the Isle of Man in 2016 and Guernsey (excluding Alderney and Sark) in 2017.

Civil partnerships providing some of the rights and benefits of marriage have also been available for same-sex couples since 2012. A bill for legalisation received royal assent on 14 December 2011 and was registered in the Royal Court on 6 January 2012. It took effect on 2 April 2012.

== Civil partnerships ==
Laws regarding same-sex partnerships in Europe¹ Marriage Civil union Limited domestic recognition (cohabitation) Unrecognized Constitution limits marriage to opposite-sex couples ¹ May include recent laws or court decisions that have not yet entered into effect.

In August 2009, Chief Minister Terry Le Sueur announced that a bill to allow civil partnerships (Jèrriais: parchonn'nie civile, pronounced [parʃõnːi sivil]; French: partenariat enregistré, pronounced [paʁtənaʁja ɑ̃ʁəʒistʁe]) offering same-sex couples some of the rights and benefits of marriage, would be drafted and be due for introduction to the States Assembly in October 2009.

On 20 October 2009, the Assembly voted in favour of civil partnerships "in principle". The vote was 48 in favour, 1 against and 4 abstaining. A draft bill legalising civil partnerships was approved by the Council of Ministers on 24 March 2011 and introduced to the Assembly on 31 May. The Assembly passed it 33–0 with 3 abstentions on 12 July 2011. On 14 December 2011, the bill received royal assent, and it was registered in the Royal Court on 6 January 2012. In March 2012, the Government of Jersey issued orders implementing the law, which took effect on 2 April 2012.

12 July 2011 vote in the States Assembly
Political affiliation	Voted for	Voted against	Abstained	Absent (Did not vote)
Independent (Senators)	6: Alan Breckon; Francis Le Gresley; Terry Le Sueur; Jim Perchard; Paul Routier; Ben Shenton	–	–	6: Freddie Cohen; Sarah Ferguson; Terry Le Main; Bryan Ian Le Marquand; Alan Maclean; Philip Ozouf
Independent (Connétables)	9: Simon Crowcroft; John Gallichan; Juliette Gallichan; Peter Hanning; Michael Jackson; Deidre Mezbourian; Daniel Murphy; Leonard Norman; Kenneth Vibert	–	–	3: Graeme Butcher; John Refault; Silvanus Yates
Independent (Deputies)	18: Deborah De Sousa; Rob Duhamel; John Fox; Andrew Green; Bob Hill; Jacqueline Hilton; Carolyn Labey; Paul Le Claire; Roy Le Hérissier; Kevin Lewis; Judy Martin; Edward Noel; Shona Pitman; Sean Power; Geoff Southern; Montfort Tadier; Tracey Vallois; Daniel Wimberley	–	3: Anna Dupre; Ian Gorst; Angela Jeune	8: Collin Egré; Mike Higgins; John Le Fondré; Jeremy Maçon; Trevor Pitman; Anne Pryke; James Reed; Philip Rondel
Total	33	0	3	17
Total	62.3%	0.0%	5.7%	32.1%

In March 2022, the States Assembly passed a bill allowing opposite-sex couples to enter into civil partnerships as well. The law, which would also allow married couples to convert their marriages into civil partnerships, entered into force on 24 March 2023. Civil partnerships were similarly extended to opposite-sex couples in the United Kingdom in 2019.

== Same-sex marriage ==
=== Legislative action ===
On 28 May 2014, Deputy Sam Mézec of the Reform Jersey party submitted a proposition asking the States Assembly to support, in principle, the legalisation of same-sex marriage, and to request Chief Minister Ian Gorst to prepare the necessary draft legislation to give effect to the proposal. On 8 July 2014, the Assembly voted for an amendment to the proposal, introduced by Senator Ian Le Marquand, to request Gorst to present a detailed study into the effects of allowing same-sex marriage by 31 December 2014. The amendment was passed by 24 votes to 18 and the amended proposition by 39 to 1. On 26 November 2014, Gorst submitted a report, which included a commitment to introduce legislation allowing same-sex couples to marry in civil and religious ceremonies by the end of 2017, and to create safeguards for religious organisations and officials who do not wish to conduct same-sex marriages, among others. On 14 July 2015, he submitted a proposition to ask the States to decide whether they agree, in principle, that same-sex couples should be allowed to marry and to request that the draft legislation necessary to implement it be introduced for approval by the States no later than January 2017. It was approved by the Assembly on 22 September 2015, 37 to 4.

22 September 2015 vote in the States Assembly
Political affiliation	Voted for	Voted against	Abstained	Absent (Did not vote)
Independent (Senators)	7: Zoe Cameron; Lyndon Farnham; Ian Gorst; Andrew Green; Alan Maclean; Philip Ozouf; Paul Routier	–	–	1: Philip Bailhache
Independent (Connétables)	7: Simon Crowcroft; Juliette Gallichan; John Le Maistre; Deidre Mezbourian; Leonard Norman; Michael Paddock; Stephen Pallett	2: Philip Le Sueur; Michel Le Troquer	1: Christopher Taylor	2: Sadie Le Sueur-Rennard; John Refault
Independent (Deputies)	20: Simon Brée; Roderick Bryans; Louise Doublet; Mike Higgins; Jackie Hilton; David Johnson; Carolyn Labey; Russell Labey; Kevin Lewis; Jeremy Maçon; Judith Martin; Terry McDonald; Peter McLinton; Kristina Moore; Edward Noel; Murray Norton; Susan Pinel; Graham Truscott; Tracey Vallois; Scott Wickenden	2: Andrew Lewis; Richard Renouf	–	4: John Le Fondré; Stephen Luce; Anne Pryke; Richard Rondel
Reform Jersey (Deputies)	3: Sam Mézec; Geoffrey Southern; Montfort Tadier	–	–	–
Total	37	4	1	7
Total	75.5%	8.2%	2.0%	14.3%

On 14 March 2017, following an oral question by Deputy Mézec, the Chief Minister stated that the bill would be lodged in anticipation for debate in the summer of 2017 and would come into force by December of the same year. However, on 8 September 2017, the Chief Minister said that the bill would be delayed and that it would not be in force until at least spring 2018. A draft same-sex marriage bill was eventually introduced to the States Assembly on 3 October 2017. The States debated the bill on 16 November 2017 and agreed to its principles but sent it for further review to the Corporate Services Scrutiny Panel. The panel's report was presented to the States on 29 January 2018. Controversially, the report included a recommendation asking the States to approve a "tolerance clause" in the bill, which would have allowed traders to refuse to serve same-sex couples goods and services in accordance with their religious beliefs. The "tolerance clause" was strenuously opposed by equality and diversity campaigners in Jersey. The equality charity Liberate organised an online petition that received over 5,000 signatures opposing the inclusion of the clause. The charity gathered key support from members of church groups and wedding suppliers opposing the clause.

A final vote on the bill by the States occurred on 1 February 2018, where it passed 42–1. The tolerance clause amendment was rejected by a vote of 40–5. The bill was granted royal assent in the Privy Council on 23 May 2018 and was registered in the Royal Court on 1 June. On 26 June, the States approved a proposition to commence the law on 1 July 2018. The first same-sex marriage was performed on 9 July 2018 in St Helier between Neil Renouf and John Cronin.

1 February 2018 vote in the States Assembly
Political affiliation	Voted for	Voted against	Abstained	Absent (Did not vote)
Independent (Senators)	6: Philip Bailhache; Lyndon Farnham; Ian Gorst; Andrew Green; Philip Ozouf; Paul Routier	–	1: Sarah Ferguson	1: Alan Maclean
Independent (Connétables)	10: Simon Crowcroft; John Le Maistre; Philip Le Sueur; Sadie Le Sueur-Rennard; Deidre Mezbourian; Leonard Norman; Michael Paddock; Stephen Pallett; John Refault; Christopher Taylor	1: Michel Le Troquer	–	1: Juliette Gallichan
Independent (Deputies)	23: Simon Brée; Roderick Bryans; Louise Doublet; Mike Higgins; Jackie Hilton; David Johnson; Carolyn Labey; Russell Labey; Andrew Lewis; Kevin Lewis; Stephen Luce; Jeremy Maçon; Judith Martin; Terry McDonald; Edward Noel; Murray Norton; Susan Pinel; Anne Pryke; Richard Renouf; Richard Rondel; Graham Truscott; Tracey Vallois; Scott Wickenden	–	–	3: John Le Fondré; Peter McLinton; Kristina Moore
Reform Jersey (Deputies)	3: Sam Mézec; Geoffrey Southern; Montfort Tadier	–	–	–
Total	42	1	1	5
Total	85.7%	2.0%	2.0%	10.2%

The Marriage and Civil Status (Amendment No. 4) (Jersey) Law 2018 defines "same sex marriage" as "the marriage of 2 persons of the same sex and includes a marriage by conversion [from a civil partnership]". It also amended Jersey law to state that:

It shall be lawful (a) for 2 persons of the same sex to marry; and (b) for civil partners to marry by converting their civil partnership to a marriage, if the marriage is solemnized in accordance with this Law.

=== Subsequent changes ===
In September 2023, the government announced its intention to introduce legislation granting automatic recognition to same-sex parents, allow both same-sex parents to be named on a Jersey birth certificate and afford parent status and responsibility to parents whose child was born to a surrogate mother. A law was passed unanimously by the States in March 2024. It received royal assent in the Privy Council on 2 October and was registered in the Royal Court on 11 October 2024 as the Children and Civil Status (Amendments) (Jersey) Law 2024.

=== Statistics ===
In 2021, Statistics Jersey estimated that 0.2% of the adult Jersey population were in same-sex marriages.

=== Religious performance ===
In February 2023, the General Synod of the Church of England voted 250–181 to allow clergy to bless same-sex marriages. The measure took effect on 17 December 2023. Jersey is part of the Diocese of Salisbury, whose bishop, Stephen Lake, voted in favour of blessing same-sex unions. The Methodist Church of Great Britain has allowed its ministers to conduct same-sex marriages since 2021. The Methodist Conference voted 254 to 46 in favour of the move in June 2021. A freedom of conscience clause allows ministers with objections to opt out of performing same-sex weddings. The smaller United Reformed Church has allowed its churches to perform same-sex marriages since 2016. Quakers formally expressed support for same-sex marriage in 2009.

== See also ==
- LGBT rights in Jersey
- Recognition of same-sex unions in Europe
- Same-sex marriage in Guernsey
