= Council of Ministers (Jersey) =

Collective institution of executive government in Jersey

- Government of Jersey
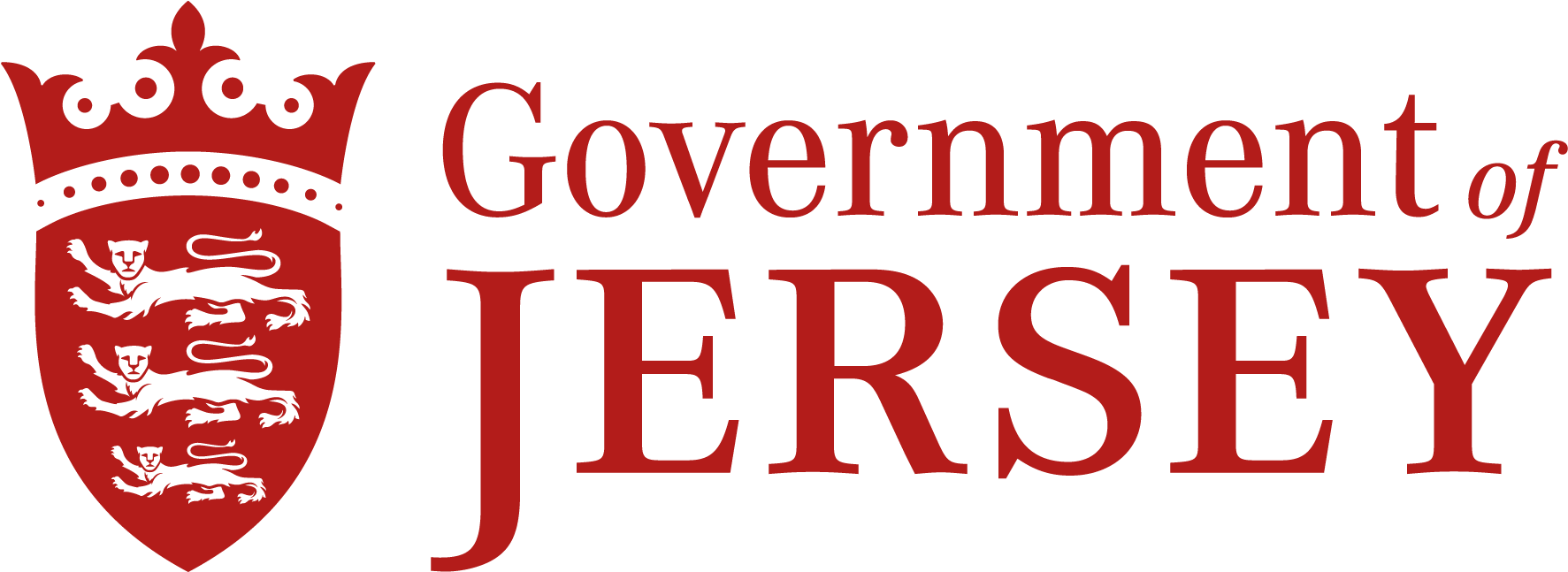
- Date formed: December 2005

People and organisations
- Monarch: Charles III
- Lieutenant Governor: Sir Jerry Kyd
- Chief Minister: Lyndon Farnham
- Appointed by: the Chief Minister with approval from the States Assembly
- Deputy Chief Minister: Tom Binet
- Member parties: Independents; Reform Jersey

History
- Incoming formation: 2026 election
- Elections: 2005, 2008, 2011, 2014, 2018, 2022, 2026
- Outgoing election: 2022
- Predecessor: Committee system

The Council of Ministers (French: Conseil des Ministres; Jèrriais: Conseil des Minnistre) is the collective decision-making body of the Government of Jersey, formed by the Ministers of the States of Jersey and the Chief Minister. The council co-ordinates policies and administration, especially policy affecting two or more ministers, prioritises executive and legislative proposals, and presents a "Strategic Plan for Jersey" for approval by the States Assembly.

The Government of Jersey is the executive and administrative arm of the States of Jersey and the identity used by the Council of Ministers for these purposes. All ministers in the council are appointed by, and must be, members of the States. The council does not represent a parliamentary majority as ministers may be elected on a variety of manifestos.

The executive is prevented from constituting a majority of the 49 elected members by the States of Jersey Law 2005, which places a legal cap of 21 on the number of states' members who may hold office as chief minister, minister and assistant ministers.

The first Council of Ministers was established in December 2005. Before then, the executive powers of the States of Jersey were managed by a committee-based system of States members.

== Constitution ==
The ministerial system of government in Jersey was established by the States of Jersey Law 2005. Part 4 establishes the role and election of Ministers.

There are at least 8 members of the Council - the Chief Minister and 7 other ministers.

The functions of the council is:

- to co-ordinate the policies and administration for which they are responsible as Ministers
- to discuss and agree policy which affects 2 or more of them
- to discuss and agree their common policy regarding external relations
- to prioritise executive and legislative proposals
- to agree and, within 4 months of their appointment, lodge for referral to one or more Scrutiny Panels, a statement of their common strategic policy
- such other matters as the Chief Minister or the Council of Ministers may determine

Ministers provide policy direction to Government officers, having given fair considering to those officers' informed and impartial advice.

== Present composition ==
The current Council of Ministers was formed after the June 2026 general election.

| Office | Holder |
|---|---|
| Chief Minister | Senator Lyndon Farnham |
| Minister for Health and Social Services and Deputy Chief Minister | Senator Tom Binet |
| Minister for Justice and Home Affairs | Senator Helen Miles |
| Minister for External Relations | Senator Ian Gorst |
| Minister for Education and Lifelong Learning | Deputy Catherine Curtis |
| Minister for Children and Families | Connétable Richard Vibert |
| Minister for the Environment | Senator Mary Le Hegarat |
| Minister for Planning and Regulation | Senator Mark Boleat — nominated for a new ministerial office due to be created at the next States sitting; in the interim, appointed Assistant Minister to the Minister for the Environment with delegated powers. |
| Minister for Housing | Deputy Malcolm Ferey |
| Minister for Infrastructure | Deputy Jonathan Renouf |
| Minister for International Development | Deputy Carolyn Labey |
| Minister for Social Security | Senator Elaine Millar |
| Minister for Sustainable Economic Development | Deputy Gerald Voisin |
| Minister for Treasury and Resources | Senator Alan Maclean |

== Appointment of ministers ==
The States Assembly elects a member for appointment as Chief Minister after every ordinary election of deputies and whenever the Chief Minister is not able to continue to fulfil their role. The Chief Minister, or any other States member, then may nominate members for appointment as Ministers. From those nominations, States members then elect members into each ministerial office. The Chief Minister or a Minister are in office until the next appointment to their role, or until they resign or are dismissed by the Chief Minister.

The States Assembly can hold a vote of no confidence in the Government and the Chief Minister, or any individual Minister. This happened in December 2020, when Senator Kristina Moore lodged a vote of no confidence in the Chief Minister over a controversy involving the Chief Executive of the Government, Charlie Parker. The proposition was lost 29 votes contre, 19 votes pour, with the Education Minister abstaining.

== Chief Minister ==
The Chief Minister acts as president of the council and matters may be brought for discussion by any minister. The Chief Minister may not be a Minister or Assistant Minister.

The functions of the Chief Minister with regard to the council are:

- to co-ordinate the discharge of common functions of the Council
- to conduct external relations with the common policy agreed by the Council

== Operation ==
Legally ultimate responsibility for the policy decisions of a department rest solely with the minister, however in practice matters are decided by a unanimous or majority vote of all the ministers. The Council of Ministers may require an individual minister to follow directs if a policy falls within the functions of the council and is in the public interest.

The minutes of Council meetings are drawn up and kept by the Office of the Greffier of the States.

== Resignations ==
The following table lists full Ministers who resigned from ministerial office while serving in the Council of Ministers. It excludes Assistant Ministers, Ministers who were dismissed or died in office, and changes following a general election or a successful vote of no confidence in the Chief Minister. The resignations listed below are concentrated in two periods: the 2008–2011 ministry led by Terry Le Sueur, and the 2018–2022 ministry led by John Le Fondré. The circumstances include resignations following policy disagreements, public controversies or investigations, and resignations connected with votes of no confidence in the Chief Minister.

Ministerial resignations from the Council of Ministers
| Date | Minister | Office resigned | Chief Minister | Circumstances |
|---|---|---|---|---|
| 20 October 2008 | Wendy Kinnard | Minister for Home Affairs | Frank Walker | Resigned after disagreement with the Council of Ministers over Home Affairs' proposal on corroboration warnings in criminal trials. |
| 21 April 2009 | Jim Perchard | Minister for Health and Social Services | Terry Le Sueur | Resigned following controversy over comments made in the States Assembly on 10 March 2009. |
| June 2010 | Terry Le Main | Minister for Housing | Terry Le Sueur | Resigned after allegations relating to his links with a developer; he denied wrongdoing, and a later police investigation found no evidence to support the allegations. |
| 2 February 2011 | Sean Power | Minister for Housing | Terry Le Sueur | Resigned after the Council of Ministers said that he should do so, following a data-protection matter involving a confidential email. |
| 5 July 2011 | Freddie Cohen | Minister for Planning and Environment | Terry Le Sueur | Resigned to focus on his role as Assistant Chief Minister with responsibility for external relations. |
| 9 November 2020 | Sam Mézec | Minister for Children and Housing | John Le Fondré | Resigned to support a vote of no confidence in the Chief Minister following controversy over the Government Chief Executive's second role. |
| 11 January 2021 | Tracey Vallois | Minister for Education | John Le Fondré | Resigned after disagreement over the Council of Ministers' approach to the return of school students during the COVID-19 pandemic in Jersey. |
| 7 June 2021 | Jeremy Maçon | Minister for Children and Education | John Le Fondré | Resigned during a police investigation, while denying guilt; police later took no further action. |
| 2 January 2024 | Tom Binet | Minister for Infrastructure | Kristina Moore | Resigned as Minister for Infrastructure and lodged a vote of no confidence in the Chief Minister. |

== Dismissals ==
Before 2014, a Minister could be dismissed only by the States Assembly, on a proposition lodged by the Chief Minister. In September 2007, Chief Minister Frank Walker brought a proposition to dismiss Stuart Syvret as Minister for Health and Social Services. The proposition cited a breakdown in relations with staff and child-protection bodies, alleged bullying and harassment of officials, and data-protection concerns arising from Syvret's handling of child-protection matters. The Assembly approved the dismissal by 30 votes to 19.

In January 2014, Chief Minister Ian Gorst lodged a proposition to dismiss Robert Duhamel as Minister for Planning and Environment. The proposition stated that the Council of Ministers had lost trust and confidence in Duhamel, and referred to concerns about transparency, planning matters, asbestos disposal and delay in the review of the Island Plan. The proposition was withdrawn before debate.

Following amendments to the States of Jersey Law 2005, now only the Chief Minister may dismiss a Minister. In March 2021, Jeremy Maçon was relieved of his ministerial duties as Minister for Children and Education by Chief Minister John Le Fondré, but a later Freedom of Information response stated that he remained the Minister, although he was not performing the associated duties. Maçon formally resigned in June 2021.

== Previous Councils ==
=== Frank Walker (2005–2008) ===
Jersey's first Ministers were appointed in 2005, with Frank Walker becoming the first Chief Minister of Jersey.

Only one of the ten ministers he nominated to join his Council of Ministers failed to be elected, Senator Len Norman, whose position was filled by Deputy Guy de Faye.

- Chief Minister of Jersey: Senator Frank Walker
- Treasury Minister: Senator Terry Le Sueur
- Economic Development Minister: Senator Philip Ozouf
- Home Affairs Minister: Deputy Andrew Lewis (replaced Senator Wendy Kinnard)
- Health and Social Services Minister: Senator Ben Shenton (replaced Senator Stuart Syvret)
- Education, Sport and Culture Minister: Senator Mike Vibert
- Planning and Environment Minister: Senator Freddie Cohen
- Housing Minister: Senator Terry Le Main
- Social Security Minister: Senator Paul Routier
- Transport and Technical Services Minister: Deputy Guy de Faye

=== Terry Le Sueur (2008–2011) ===
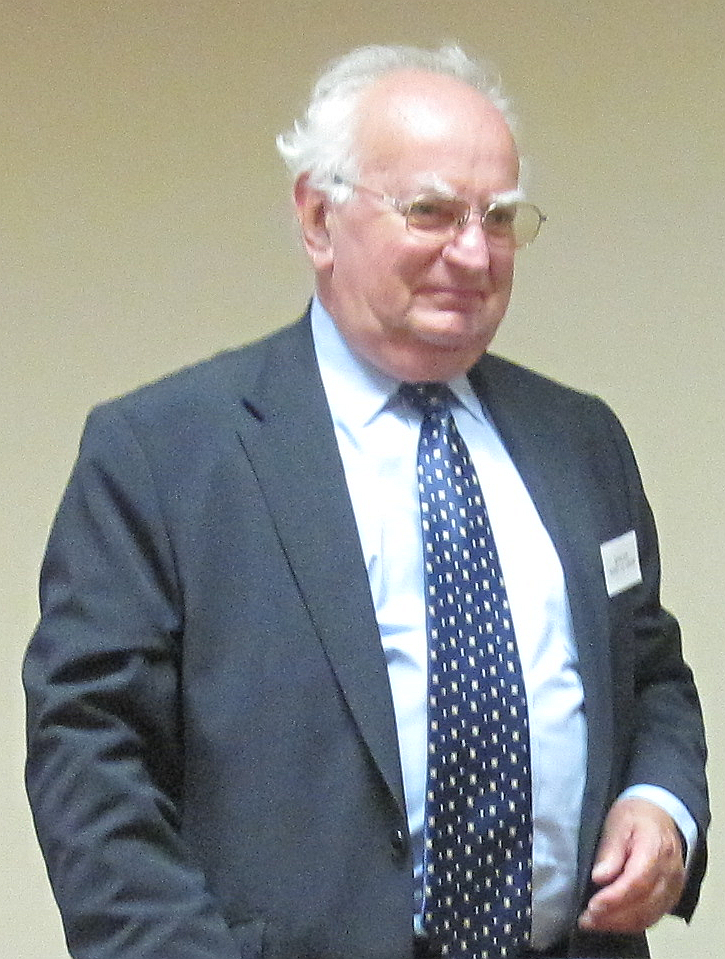
Former Senator Terry Le Sueur was Chief Minister of Jersey

Elections for ministerial posts were held on 11 and 12 December 2008. The nominees of the Chief Minister were successful with the exception of Senator Routier, proposed successively for Health and Social Services and Education, Sport and Culture. Three ministers subsequently resigned as ministers (but remained as States members) in the face of criticisms of their personal conduct: Senator Jim Perchard (2009), Deputy Terry Le Main (2010) and Deputy Sean Power (2011), triggering further elections. One minister, Senator Freddie Cohen, exchanged the role of Planning and Environment Minister for that of "foreign minister" in 2011.

- Chief Minister of Jersey: Senator Terry Le Sueur
- Treasury Minister: Senator Philip Ozouf (elected with 38 votes; Deputy Geoff Southern received 13 votes)
- Economic Development Minister: Senator Alan Maclean (elected with 32 votes; Deputy Mike Higgins received 20 votes)
- Home Affairs Minister: Senator Ian Le Marquand (elected with 34 votes; Senator Stuart Syvret received 18 votes)
- Health and Social Services Minister: Deputy Anne Pryke (from April 2009). Her predecessor, Senator Jim Perchard (elected in 2008 with 31 votes; Senator Paul Routier receiving 21 votes) resigned in April 2009 after controversy surrounding remarks he made in the chamber urging Senator Stuart Syvret to commit suicide.
- Education, Sport and Culture Minister: Deputy James Reed (elected on the fourth round with 31 votes). Deputy Reed was the Chief Minister's initial candidate for the post. However, when his nomination of Senator Routier for Health and Social Services was defeated, he withdrew Deputy Reed's name and nominated Senator Routier in his place. Deputies Reed, Judy Martin and Roy Le Hérissier were also nominated. In the first round of voting Senator Routier received 16 votes, Deputy Reed 13 votes, Deputy Le Hérissier 12 votes and Deputy Martin 11 votes. With Deputy Martin eliminated, in the second round Deputy Le Hérissier received 20 votes while Senator Routier and Deputy Reed both received 16 votes. In the tie-breaking third round Deputy Reed received 29 votes and Senator Routier was eliminated with 23 votes. In the final round Deputy Reed was elected with 31 votes and Deputy Le Hérissier received 22 votes.
- Planning and Environment Minister: Deputy Rob Duhamel (from July 2011). Senator Freddie Cohen, who was elected to the ministerial post unopposed in 2008, resigned in order to focus on his role as "foreign minister" (formally, as an assistant minister to the Chief Minister).
- Housing Minister: Deputy Andrew Green (from February 2011). He replaced Deputy Sean Power, in post since June 2010, was resigned after he was "found to have broken the Data Protection Law by sending a confidential and personal email to a States colleague on to a third party". Power's predecessor had also resigned: Senator Terry Le Main, elected in 2008 with 27 votes (Senator Alan Breckon receiving 25 votes), stood down as minister in June 2010, following unproven allegations, which he vigorously denied, about his relationship with a property developer.
- Social Security Minister: Deputy Ian Gorst (elected with 36 votes; Deputy Geoff Southern received 16 votes)
- Transport and Technical Services Minister: Constable Mike Jackson (elected with 33 votes; Deputy Rob Duhamel received 19 votes)

=== Ian Gorst's first term (2011–2014) ===
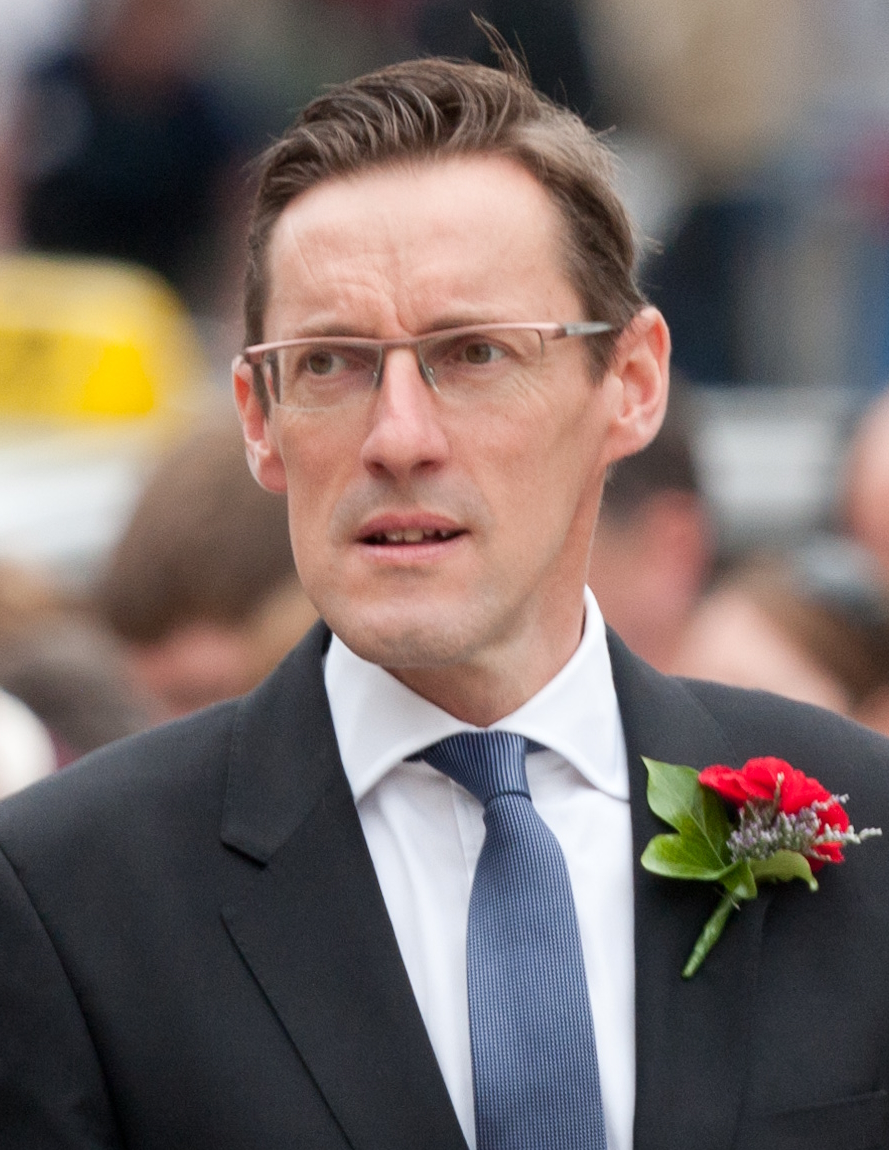
Senator Ian Gorst the Chief Minister of Jersey

Elections for ministerial posts were held on 17 and 18 November 2011. The chief minister's nominations were all contested; two of his nominations were defeated, and five ministerial posts were decided by margins of between 1 and 3 votes. The chief minister's nomination of Senator Ian Le Marquand to the Treasury was defeated, and so the chief minister amended his nomination for Home Affairs to retain Senator Le Marquand on the council, by withdrawing his nomination of Senator Lyndon Farnham. The chief minister's nomination of Connétable John Refault to Transport and Technical Services was defeated, with Deputy Kevin Lewis, a former Assistant Minister for Transport and Technical Services, being elected.

- Chief Minister of Jersey: Senator Ian Gorst
- Treasury and Resources Minister: Senator Philip Ozouf
- Economic Development Minister: Senator Alan Maclean
- Home Affairs Minister and Deputy Chief Minister: Senator Ian Le Marquand
- Health and Social Services Minister: Deputy Anne Pryke
- Education, Sport and Culture Minister: Deputy Patrick Ryan
- Planning and Environment Minister: Deputy Rob Duhamel
- Housing Minister: Deputy Andrew Green
- Social Security Minister: Senator Francis Le Gresley
- Transport and Technical Services Minister: Deputy Kevin Lewis

=== Ian Gorst's second term (2014–2018) ===
- Chief Minister of Jersey: Senator Ian Gorst
- Treasury and Resources Minister: Senator Alan Maclean
- Economic Development Minister: Senator Lyndon Farnham
- Home Affairs Minister: Deputy Kristina Moore
- Health and Social Services Minister: Senator Andrew Green
- Education, Sport and Culture Minister: Deputy Rod Bryans
- Planning and Environment Minister: Deputy Steve Luce
- Housing Minister: Deputy Anne Pryke
- Social Security Minister: Deputy Susie Pinel
- Transport and Technical Services Minister: Deputy Eddie Noel

=== John Le Fondré (2018–2022) ===
The Council of Ministers saw a number of changes during John Le Fondré's time as Chief Minister. Of his 2018 picks, several were no longer in office by the end of the electoral term.

Jersey's Council of Ministers under John Le Fondré
| Portfolio | Minister | Term |
|---|---|---|
Ministers
| Chief Minister | Senator John Le Fondré | 2018–2022 |
| Deputy Chief Minister | Senator Tracey Vallois | 2018–2018 |
| Deputy Chief Minister | Senator Lyndon Farnham | 2018–2022 |
| Minister for Children & Housing | Senator Sam Mézec | 2018–2020 |
| Minister for Children & Housing; Minister for Children & Education | Deputy Jeremy Maçon | 2020–2021 |
| Minister for Children & Education | Deputy Scott Wickenden | 2021-2022 |
| Minister for Economic Development, Tourism, Sport and Culture | Senator Lyndon Farnham | 2018–2022 |
| Minister for Education | Senator Tracey Vallois | 2018–2021 |
| Minister for the Environment | Deputy John Young | 2018–2022 |
| Minister for External Relations | Senator Ian Gorst | 2018–2022 |
| Minister for Infrastructure | Deputy Kevin Lewis | 2018–2022 |
| Minister for International Development | Deputy Carolyn Labey | 2018–present |
| Minister for Health and Social Services | Deputy Richard Renouf | 2018–2022 |
| Minister for Home Affairs | Connétable Len Norman | 2018–2021 |
| Minister for Home Affairs | Deputy Gregory Guida | 2021–2022 |
| Minister for Housing and Communities | Deputy Russell Labey | 2021-2022 |
| Minister for Social Security | Deputy Judy Martin | 2018–2022 |
| Minister for Treasury and Resources | Deputy Susie Pinel | 2018–2022 |

| Party key | Jersey Alliance |
| Party key | Independent |
| Party key | Reform Jersey |

On 12 December 2018, Senator Tracey Vallois resigned as Deputy Chief Minister to focus on her Education portfolio. She later resigned from her post as Minister for Education on 11 January 2021 following a disagreement with other Ministers over allowing students back to school during the COVID-19 pandemic.

The Children & Housing Minister, Sam Mézec resigned from his post on 9 November 2020 to back a vote of no confidence against Senator Le Fondré.

Deputy Jeremy Maçon took over the role of Minister for Children and Housing, which was later renamed 'Minister for Children and Education' (combining Senators Mézec and Vallois' previous roles) while a new position of 'Minister for Housing and Communities' was created. Maçon was relieved of his ministerial duties by the Chief Minister on 24 March 2021 and formally resigned three months later.

The Home Affairs Minister, Connetable Len Norman, died on 1 July 2021. His Assistant Minister, Deputy Gregory Guida, took over as Minister for Home Affairs.

Assistant ministers

| Portfolio | Minister |
|---|---|
| Assistant Minister for Treasury and Resources Assistant Minister for Home Affairs | Lindsey Ash Deputy |
| Assistant Chief Minister Assistant Minister for External Relations and Financial Services | Richard Buchanan Connétable |
| Assistant Minister for the Environment | Gregory Guida DeputyDeputy |
| Assistant Chief Minister | Rowland Huelin DeputyDeputy |
| Assistant Chief Minister | Carolyn Labey DeputyDeputy |
| Assistant Minister for Economic Development, Tourism, Sport and Culture | Kirsten Morel DeputyDeputy |
| Assistant Minister for the Environment | Jess Perchard DeputyDeputy |
| Assistant Minister for Health and Social Services Assistant Minister for Children and Education | Trevor Pointon DeputyDeputy |
| Assistant Minister for Health and Social Services Assistant Minister for Infrastructure Assistant Minister for Economic Development, Tourism, Sport and Culture | Hugh Raymond DeputyDeputy |
| Assistant Minister for Children and Education | Richard Vibert Connétable |
| Assistant Chief Minister Assistant Minister for Social Security | Scott Wickenden Deputy |
| Assistant Minister for Social Security Assistant Minister for Housing and Communities | Jeremy Maçon Deputy |

=== Kristina Moore administration (2022–2024) ===
The Council of Ministers was selected by the States Assembly on Monday 11 July 2022. All of the candidates nominated by newly-elected Chief Minister, Deputy Kristina Moore, were backed by States Members.

Only the International Development Minister, Deputy Carolyn Labey, retained her role from the previous government. Deputy Ian Gorst, who served as External Relations Minister under John Le Fondré's premiership, kept his place on the Council of Ministers but in a new role overseeing the Treasury.

Deputies Kristina Moore and Philip Ozouf both returned to the government after a four-year absence, while six of the 2022 cohort of Ministers were new to politics.

All of the Ministers and Assistant Ministers are independent politicians, apart from Assistant Social Security Minister, Deputy Malcolm Ferey, who is a member of the Jersey Liberal Conservatives.

- Chief Minister of Jersey: Deputy Kristina Moore
- Treasury and Resources Minister: Deputy Ian Gorst
- Economic Development Minister: Deputy Kirsten Morel
- Home Affairs Minister: Deputy Helen Miles
- Health and Social Services Minister: Deputy Karen Wilson
- Education, Sport and Culture Minister: Deputy Inna Gardiner
- Planning and Environment Minister: Deputy Jonathan Renouf
- Housing Minister: Deputy David Warr
- Social Security Minister: Deputy Elaine Millar
- Infrastructure Minister: Deputy Tom Binet

=== Lyndon Farnham's first term (2024-2026) ===
| Portfolio | Minister | Term |
|---|---|---|
Ministers
| Chief Minister | Deputy Lyndon Farnham | 2024–present |
| Deputy Chief Minister Minister for Health and Social Services | Deputy Tom Binet | 2024–present |
| Minister for Housing and Communities | Deputy Sam Mézec | 2022–present |
| Minister for Social Security | Deputy Lyndsay Feltham | 2022–present |
| Minister for Children and Education | Deputy Robert Ward | 2022–present |
| Minister for External Relations | Deputy Ian Gorst | 2022–present |
| Minister for International Development | Deputy Carolyn Labey | 2018–present |
| Minister for Infrastructure | Deputy Andy Jehan | 2022–present |
| Minister for Home Affairs | Deputy Mary Le Hegarat | 2022–present |
| Minister for Treasury and Resources | Deputy Elaine Millar | 2022–present |
| Minister for the Environment | Chief Minister or delegate (Deputy Steve Luce having not been re-elected) | 2022–present |

{| class=wikitable

! rowspan="24" | Party key | style="background:#DCDCDC" | | Independent |- ! |Reform Jersey |- | style="background:#3494CD" | | Better Way |- | style="background:#3741F0" | | Jersey Liberal Conservatives |}
