= 2011 Jersey general election =

- 19 October 2011

45 of the 51 seats in the States Assembly
Chief Minister before election
Terry Le Sueur
Independent
Chief Minister after election
Ian Gorst
Independent

General elections were held in Jersey on 19 October 2011 to elect 45 members of the States Assembly. This was the first time Senators, Deputies and Constables were elected on a single day in Jersey. The number of members of the States of Jersey was reduced from 53 to 51. Six Senators who had been elected in 2008 for a period of six years did not face election in 2011.

== Nominations ==
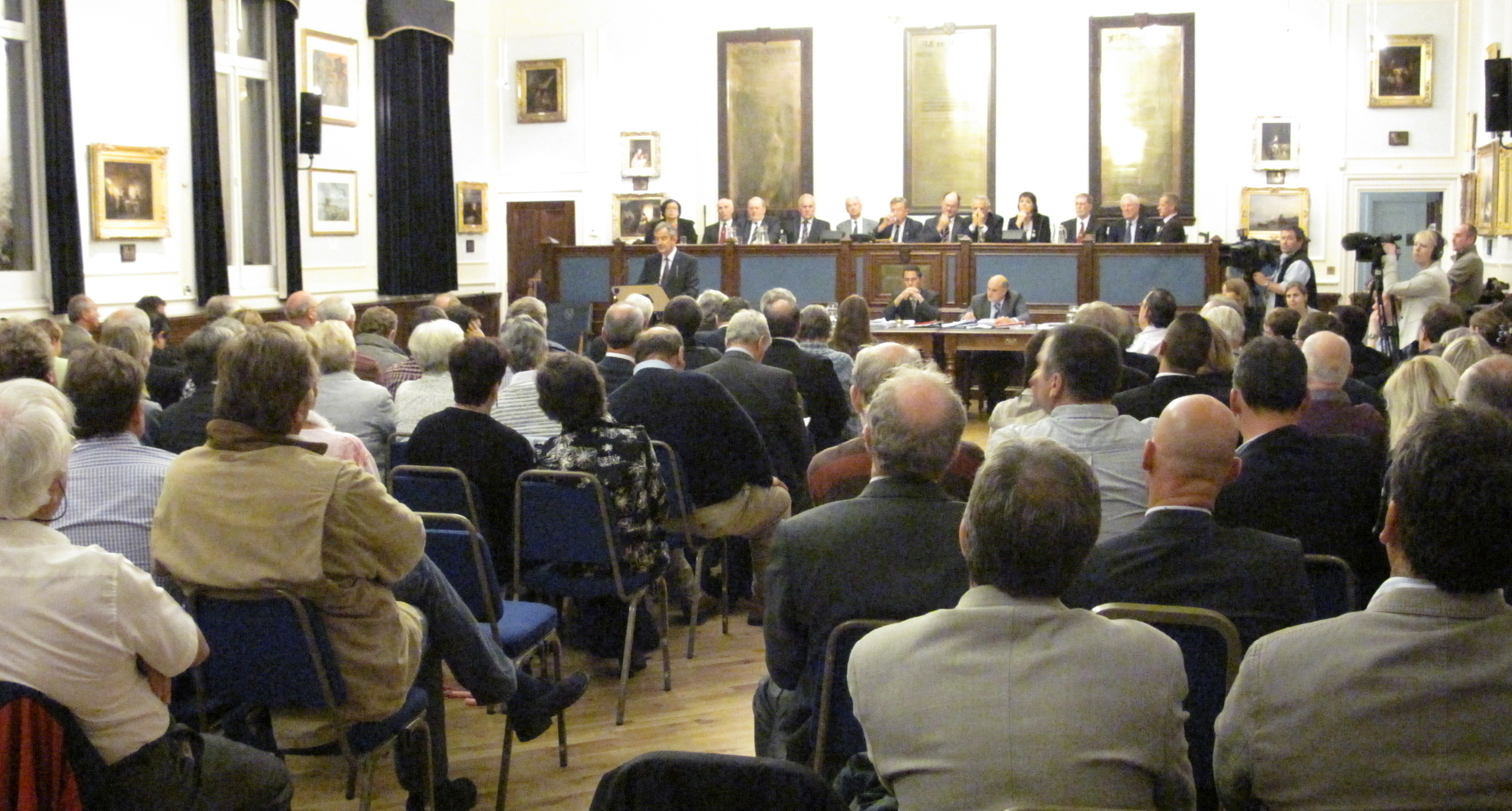
Electoral Assembly, 6 September 2011: nominations for Senator

Nominations for candidates took place on 6 September at the Town Hall, St Helier, Jersey for the four Senatorial seats and at each parish hall on 7 September for the twelve Constable and twenty nine Deputy seats.

== Results ==
=== Senators ===
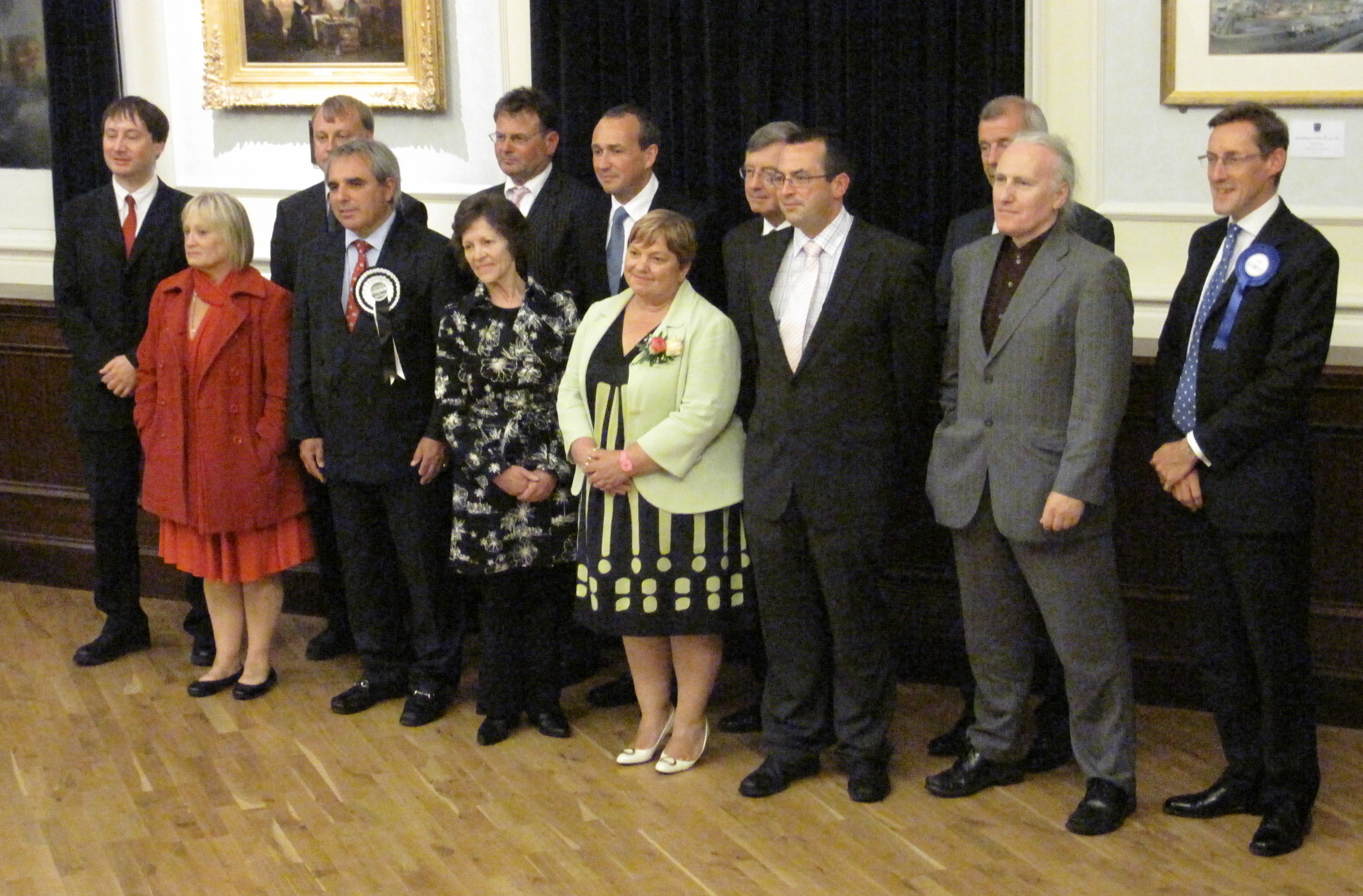
The 13 candidates for Senator

Candidate	Votes	%	Notes
Philip Bailhache	17,538	18.89	Elected
Ian Gorst	15,614	16.81	Elected
Francis Le Gresley	14,981	16.13	Elected
Lyndon Farnham	11,095	11.95	Elected
Rose Colley	8,253	8.89	
Freddie Cohen	7,922	8.53	
Stuart Syvret	6,402	6.89	
Mark Forskitt	2,813	3.03	
Linda Corby	2,489	2.68	
David Richardson	1,570	1.69	
Darius Pearce	1,562	1.68	
Sylvia Lagadu	1,332	1.43	
Christopher Whitworth	1,296	1.40	
Source: vote.je

=== Deputies ===
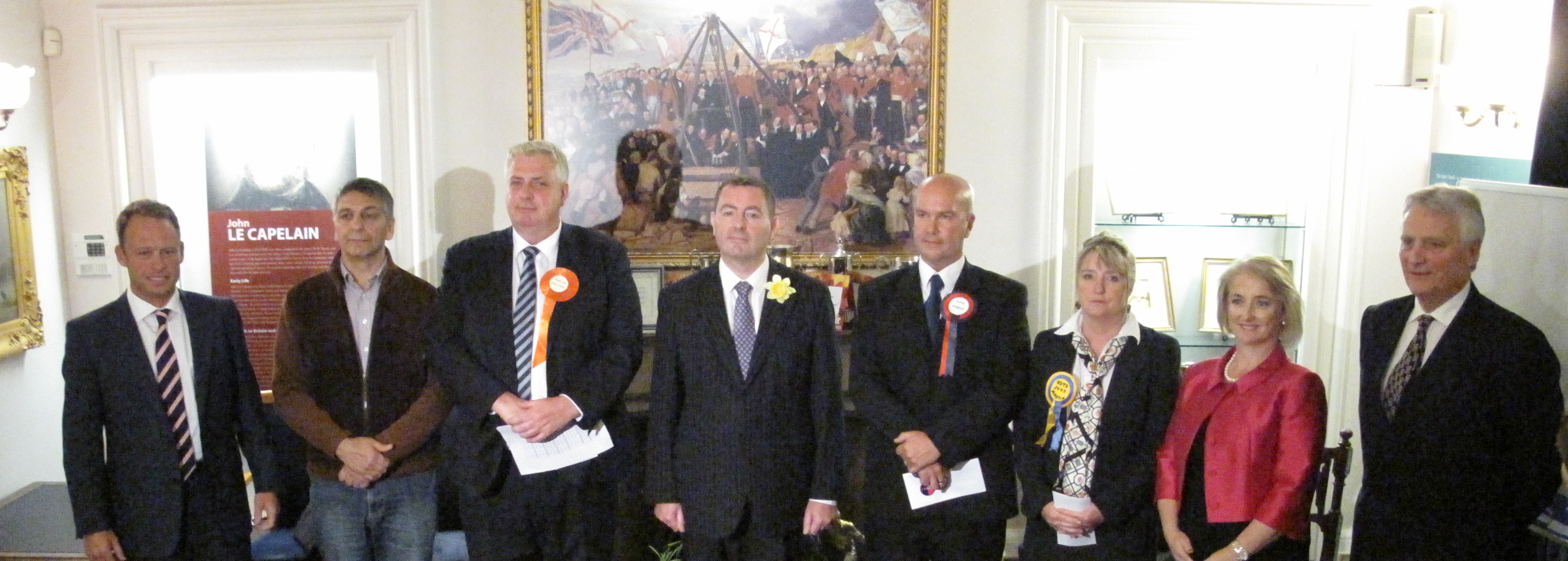
Nominations, 7 September 2011: candidates for Deputy, Saint Helier 1

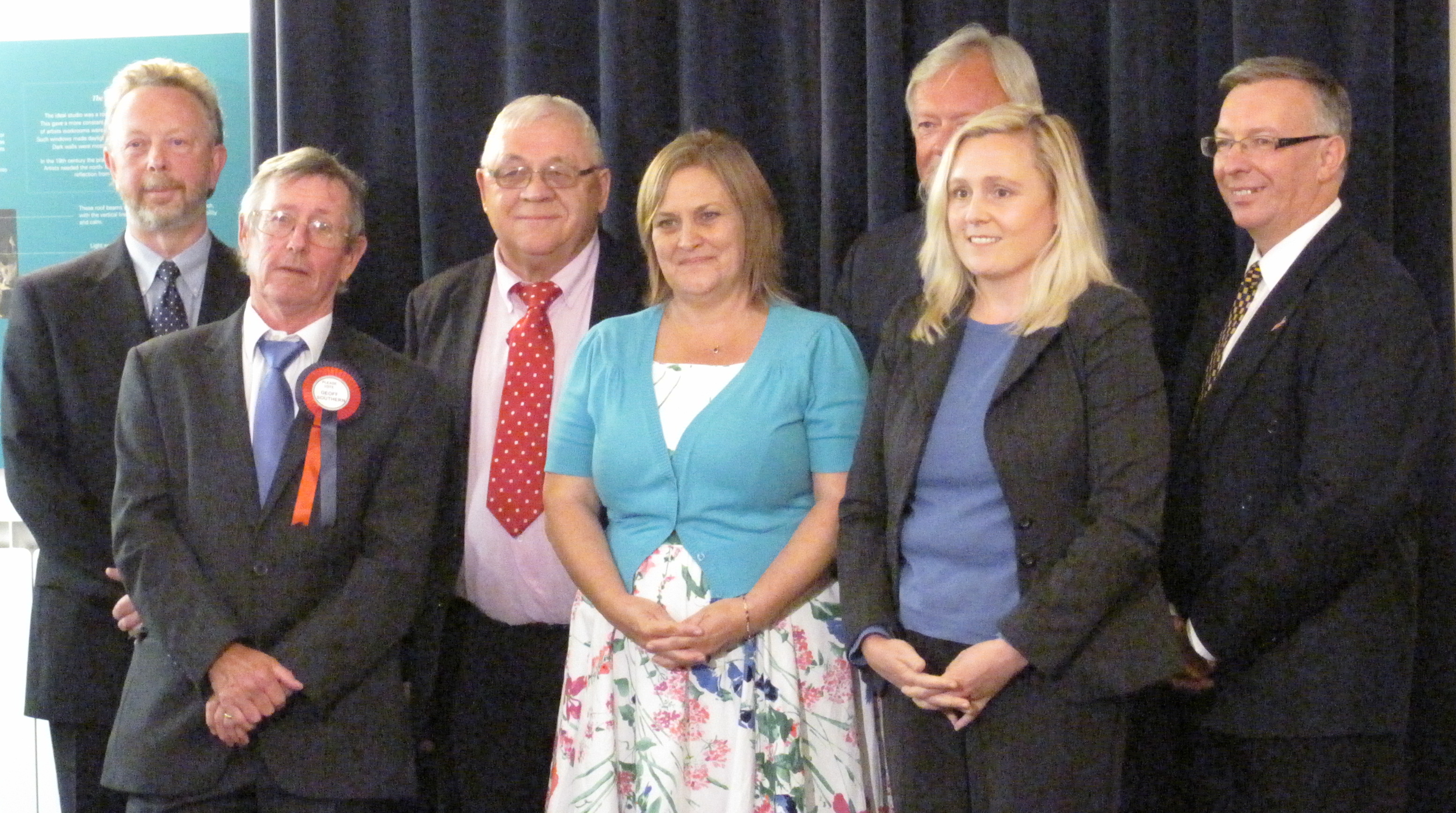
Nominations, 7 September 2011: candidates for Deputy, Saint Helier 2

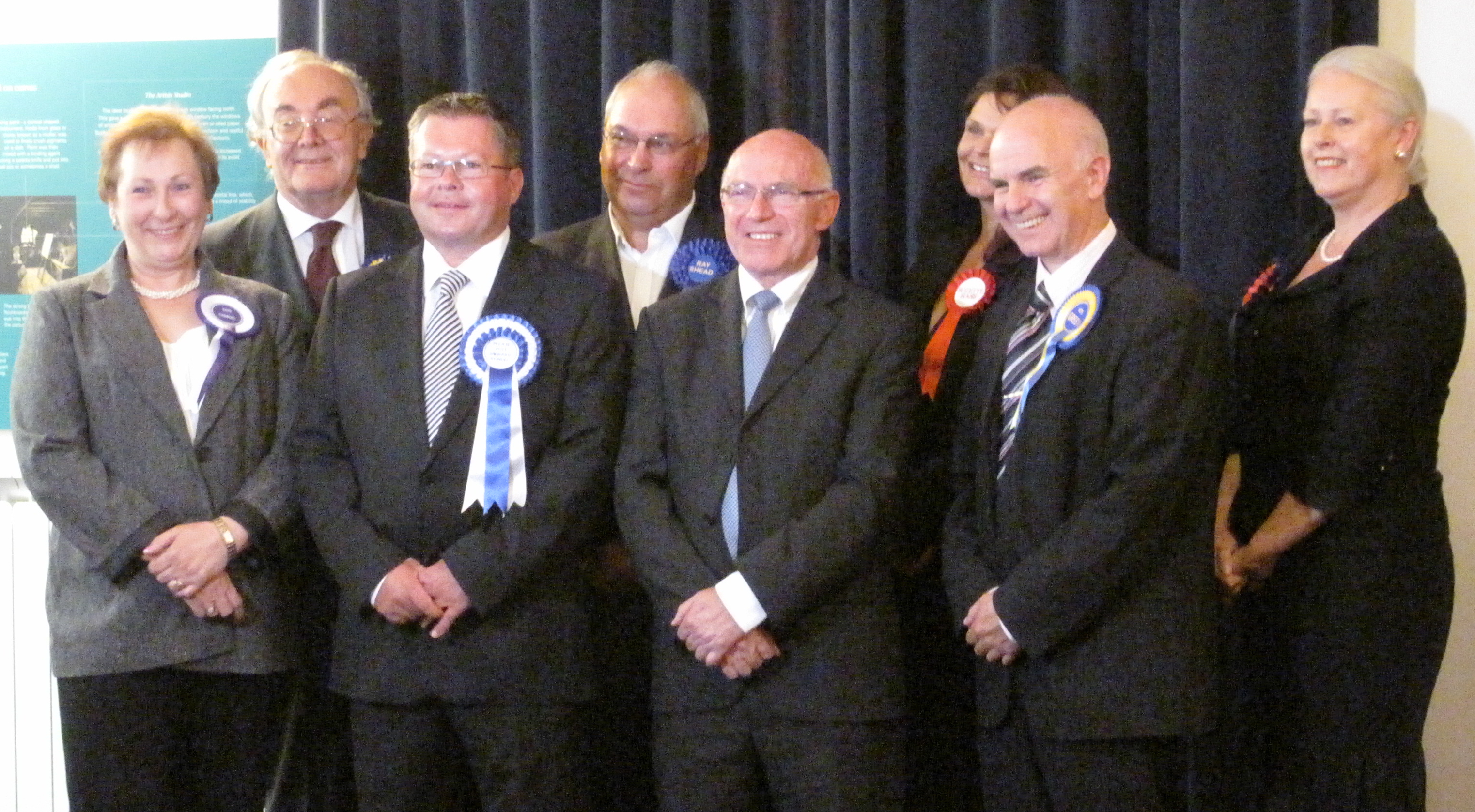
Nominations, 7 September 2011: candidates for Deputy, Saint Helier 3 & 4

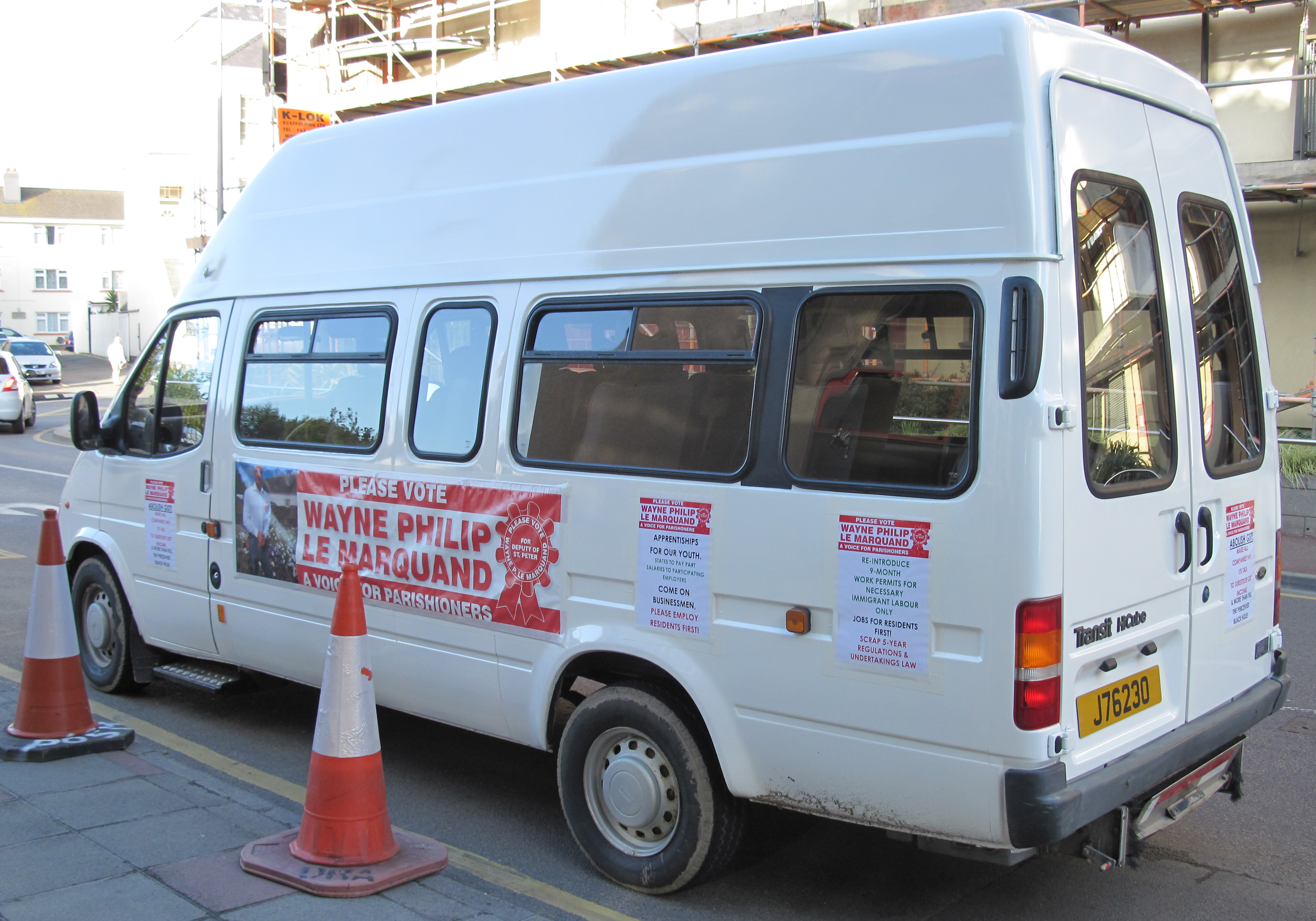
Wayne Le Marquand election transport

Constituency	Candidate	Votes	%	Notes
Grouville	Carolyn Labey	1,075	56.05	Elected
Grouville	Domonic Jones	843	43.95	
St. Brelade 1	John Young	339	28.11	Elected
St. Brelade 1	Margaret Holland Prior	306	25.37	
St. Brelade 1	Jeffrey Hathaway	285	23.63	
St. Brelade 1	Angela Jeune	276	22.89	
St. Brelade 2	Sean Power	1,491	35.12	Elected
St. Brelade 2	Montfort Tadier	1,428	33.63	Elected
St. Brelade 2	Mervyn Le Masurier	1,327	31.25	
St. Clement	Susan Pinel	1,314	27.90	Elected
St. Clement	Gerard Baudains	979	20.79	Elected
St. Clement	David Cabeldu	712	15.12	
St. Clement	Simon Bree	710	15.08	
St. Clement	Anne Dupre	679	14.42	
St. Clement	Peter Ward	315	6.69	
St. Helier 1	James Baker	767	17.01	Elected
St. Helier 1	Trevor Pitman	763	16.92	Elected
St. Helier 1	Judy Martin	717	15.90	Elected
St. Helier 1	Paul Le Claire	700	15.52	
St. Helier 1	Nick Le Cornu	571	12.66	
St. Helier 1	Keith Shaw	482	10.69	
St. Helier 1	Mary O'Keeffe-Burgher	331	7.34	
St. Helier 1	Gino Risoli	178	3.95	
St. Helier 2	Rod Bryans	763	18.69	Elected
St. Helier 2	Shona Pitman	742	18.17	Elected
St. Helier 2	Geoff Southern	694	17.00	Elected
St. Helier 2	Terry Le Main	593	14.52	
St. Helier 2	Debbie De Sousa	579	14.18	
St. Helier 2	Charles Raymond	430	10.53	
St. Helier 2	Bernie Manning	282	6.91	
St. Helier 3 & 4	Jackie Hilton	1,941	17.82	Elected
St. Helier 3 & 4	Andrew Green	1,924	17.66	Elected
St. Helier 3 & 4	Richard Rondel	1,870	17.16	Elected
St. Helier 3 & 4	Mike Higgins	1,464	13.44	Elected
St. Helier 3 & 4	Suzette Hase	1,158	10.63	
St. Helier 3 & 4	Denise Carroll	874	8.02	
St. Helier 3 & 4	Ted Vibert	865	7.94	
St. Helier 3 & 4	Ray Shead	799	7.33	
St. John	Patrick Ryan	528	45.13	Elected
St. John	Andrew Lewis	437	37.35	
St. John	David Ward	205	17.52	
St. Lawrence	Eddie Noel	—	—	Elected unopposed
St. Lawrence	John Le Fondré	—	—	Elected unopposed
St. Martin	Stephen Luce	1,008	58.71	Elected
St. Martin	Bob Hill	709	41.29	
St. Mary	John Le Bailly	291	41.81	Elected
St. Mary	David Johnson	246	35.34	
St. Mary	Ray Cooper	159	22.84	
St. Ouen	James Reed	808	48.18	Elected
St. Ouen	Chris Lamy	322	19.20	
St. Ouen	Alan Le Quense	294	17.53	
St. Ouen	Cliff Le Clercq	253	15.09	
St. Peter	Kristina Moore	1,169	66.50	Elected
St. Peter	Wayne Le Marquand	589	33.50	
St. Saviour 1	Rob Duhamel	773	34.26	Elected
St. Saviour 1	Jeremy Maçon	621	27.53	Elected
St. Saviour 1	Hedi Green	462	20.48	
St. Saviour 1	Isabella Lewis	400	17.73	
St. Saviour 2	Kevin Lewis	732	40.69	Elected
St. Saviour 2	Tracey Vallois	680	37.80	Elected
St. Saviour 2	Shelley Rose	387	21.51	
St. Saviour 3	Roy Le Herissier	764	75.72	Elected
St. Saviour 3	Charles Gouyet	245	24.28	
Trinity	Anne Pryke	—	—	Elected unopposed
Source: vote.je

=== Constables ===
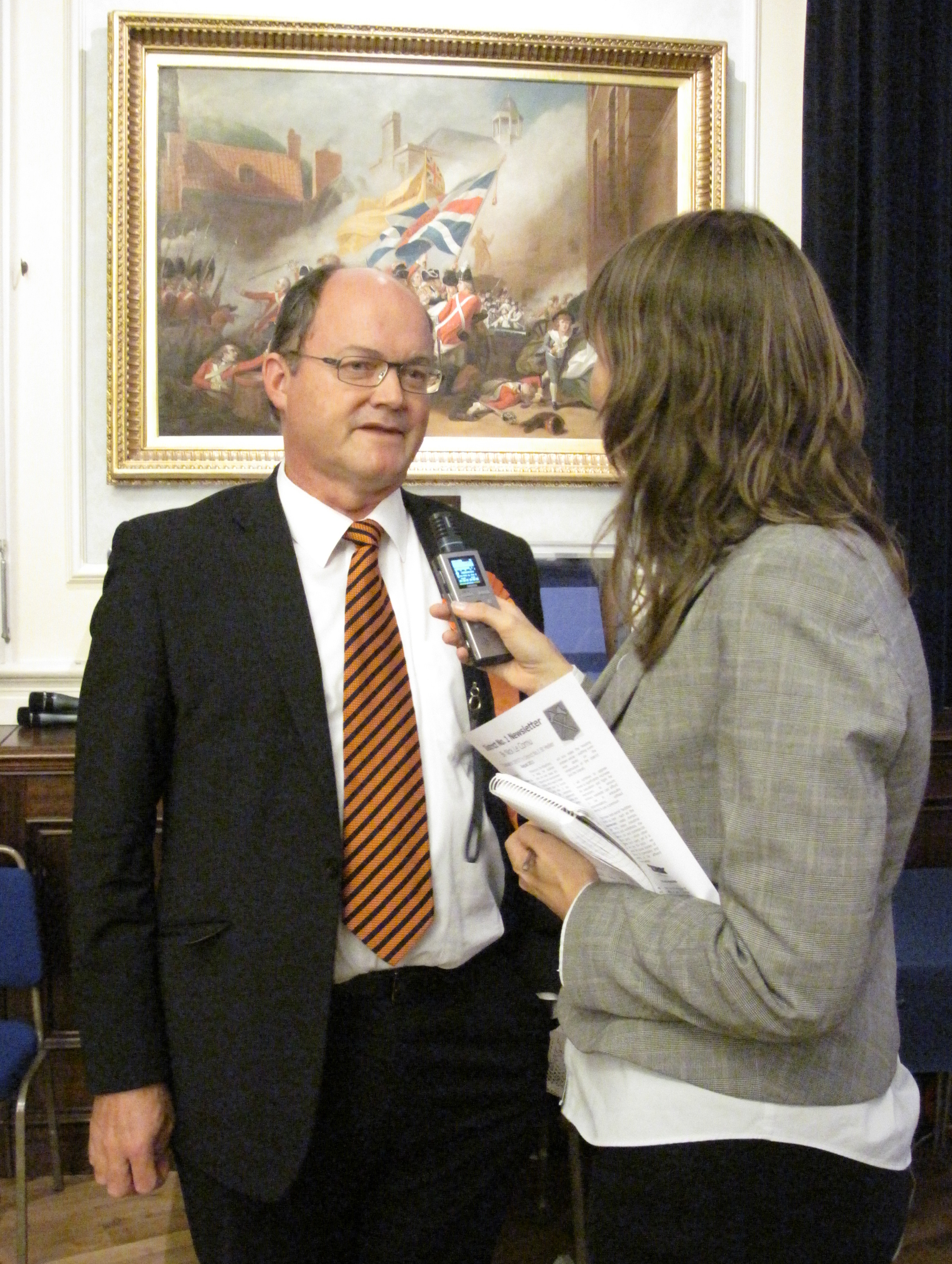
Simon Crowcroft, being interviewed by BBC Jersey following his re-election unopposed at the Electoral Assembly, 7 September 2011

Each Parish of the island of Jersey elects one Constable who is both a member of the States of Jersey and head of the Parish Municipality, the Constable acts at both national and regional political levels. The Constable is often referred to as the Father of the Parish. For the first time since 1903 the position of Constable in the Parish of St Ouen will be contested following the decision of incumbent Ken Vibert to stand down.

Parish	Candidate	Votes	%	Notes
Grouville	Dan Murphy	—	—	Elected unopposed
St. Brelade	Stephen Pallet	1,999	54.56	Elected
St. Brelade	Michael Jackson	1,665	45.44	
St. Clement	Len Norman	—	—	Elected unopposed
St. Helier	Simon Crowcroft	—	—	Elected unopposed
St. John	Phil Rondel	—	—	Elected unopposed
St. Lawrence	Deidre Mezbourian	969	53.68	Elected
St. Lawrence	James Le Feuvre	836	46.32	
St. Martin	Michel Le Troquer	—	—	Elected unopposed
St. Mary	Juliette Gallichan	—	—	Elected unopposed
St. Ouen	Michael Paddock	1,143	65.88	Elected
St. Ouen	Richard Renouf	592	34.12	
St. Peter	John Refault	—	—	Elected unopposed
St. Saviour	Sadie Rennard	1,740	53.02	Elected
St. Saviour	Peter Hanning	1,542	46.98	
Trinity	John Gallichan	—	—	Elected unopposed
Source: vote.je

== Municipal elections ==
Municipal elections took place in November 2011 for the election of Procureur du Bien Public, Roads Inspectors, Rates Assessors, Honorary Police, Roads Committee & Accounts Committee. These elections are generally uncontested.

== See also ==
- Elections in Jersey
- Political parties in Jersey
- Politics of Jersey
- Constitution of Jersey
