= Jonathan Renouf =

Jersey politician and television producer

Minister for Infrastructure
- Incumbent
- Assumed office 29 June 2026
- Monarch: Charles III
- Lieutenant Governor: Sir Jerry Kyd
- Preceded by: Andy Jehan

Minister for the Environment
- In office 12 July 2022 – 30 January 2024
- Preceded by: John Young
- Succeeded by: Steve Luce

Deputy of the States Assembly for St Brelade
- Incumbent
- Assumed office 27 June 2022 Serving with Gabriel Raimondo, Montfort Tadier

Personal details
- Party: Independent
- Education: Durham University
- Occupation: Politician, television producer

Jonathan Renouf is a Jersey politician and former television producer who has served as Minister for Infrastructure since June 2026. He has been a Deputy in the States Assembly for St Brelade since 2022, and previously served as Minister for the Environment from 2022 to 2024.

== Early life and career ==
Renouf was educated in Jersey at La Moye, Les Quennevais and Hautlieu, before studying geography at Durham University, where he completed a degree and a PhD.

Before entering politics, Renouf worked for nearly 30 years at the BBC, including on Newsnight and in the BBC Science department. His work included producing science and environment documentaries, including programmes associated with Brian Cox and David Attenborough. The Guardian described him as a series producer in the BBC science department, and noted that he had worked on Earth: The Power of the Planet, Meltdown: A Global Warming Journey, Horizon and Rough Science.

Renouf was also a member of Jersey's 2012 Electoral Commission.

== Political career ==
Renouf stood as an independent candidate for Deputy in St Brelade at the 2022 Jersey general election. He was elected with 1,782 votes, behind Helen Miles and Moz Scott in the four-seat constituency.

He was appointed Minister for the Environment in July 2022, serving in the government of Chief Minister Kristina Moore. As Environment Minister, Renouf promoted environmental and climate policies, including proposals relating to tree protection and offshore wind energy. After the vote of no confidence in Deputy Kristina Moore as Chief Minister, Renouf’s term as Environment Minister ended on 30 January 2024, when Steve Luce was appointed to the role in Lyndon Farnham's new Council of Ministers.

Renouf was re-elected in the 2026 Jersey general election, topping the poll for Deputies in St Brelade with 2,414 votes. On 29 June 2026, he was elected unopposed as Minister for Infrastructure in Farnham's post-election Council of Ministers.
