= Helen Miles (Jersey politician) =

Jersey politician

Senator Helen Miles

Minister for Justice and Home Affairs
- Incumbent
- Assumed office 2026
- Preceded by: Mary Le Hegarat

Senator
- Incumbent
- Assumed office 2026

Deputy of St Brelade
- In office 2022–2026

Personal details
- Party: Independent
- Profession: Criminologist

Helen Miles is a Jersey politician and criminologist who has served as a Senator in the States Assembly since 2026 and as Minister for Justice and Home Affairs in the Government of Jersey. An independent politician, she was previously elected as a Deputy for St Brelade in 2022 and served as Minister for Home Affairs, later Minister for Justice and Home Affairs, in the government of Deputy Kristina Moore.

== Career before politics ==
Before entering elected politics, Miles worked in Jersey's public service for more than 30 years, including in Customs and Immigration, Probation and Aftercare, the States of Jersey Police, and policy roles. Bailiwick Express reported that she became Director of Criminal Justice at the States police, obtained a PhD in criminology in 2008, and taught at the Institute of Law in Jersey.

She was also a founding member of Autism Jersey and served as its vice-chair.

== Political career ==
Miles was elected to the States Assembly in the 2022 Jersey general election as an independent Deputy for St Brelade. She was appointed Minister for Home Affairs in Kristina Moore's government in July 2022. In January 2023, the role was expanded and renamed Minister for Justice and Home Affairs after justice policy and equality and diversity responsibilities were transferred into her portfolio.

Following the vote of no confidence in Moore in January 2024, Miles’s Assembly work focused on scrutiny. She subsequently chaired the Corporate Services Scrutiny Panel and led a review into the relationship between the parishes and the Government of Jersey.

In March 2026, Miles announced that she would stand for one of the nine island-wide Senatorial seats in the 2026 Jersey general election. She topped the Senatorial poll with 15,859 votes.

After the election, Miles was discussed as a possible candidate for Chief Minister. She instead backed Lyndon Farnham's bid to continue as Chief Minister and agreed to join his government. Farnham later nominated Miles as Minister for Justice and Home Affairs.

== See also ==
- States Assembly
- Council of Ministers (Jersey)
- Politics of Jersey
