= Richard Vibert =

Jersey politician

Minister for Children and Families
- Incumbent
- Assumed office 27 February 2024
- Preceded by: Office established

Connétable of St Peter
- Incumbent
- Assumed office 2018
- Preceded by: John Refault

Personal details
- Party: Independent

Richard Vibert is a Jersey politician who has served as Connétable of St Peter since 2018 and as Minister for Children and Families since 2024. He sits in the States Assembly as an independent member and is a member of the Council of Ministers.

== Before politics ==
Before entering the States Assembly, Vibert served in the Honorary Police in St Peter, including eight years as Chef de Police.

== Political career ==
Vibert unopposed as Connétable of St Peter at the 2018 Jersey general election.

Vibert was re-elected in 2022, when he was again the only candidate for Connétable and received 1,150 votes against 278 for "None of the Candidates". During his time in the Assembly he served on scrutiny and became Assistant Minister for Children and Education.

During the administration of Chief Minister Kristina Moore, Vibert served as Assistant Minister for Children and Education and as Assistant Minister for Treasury and Resources. In January 2024, he resigned from those roles in order to support a motion of no confidence in Moore's leadership. Following the change of government, Vibert was appointed Minister for Children and Education in Chief Minister Lyndon Farnham’s first Council of Ministers. The portfolio was then split into separate ministerial offices for children and for education, with Vibert becoming Minister for Children and Families.

At the 2026 Jersey general election, Vibert was elected for a third term as Connétable of St Peter, receiving 1,289 votes against 225 for "None of the Candidates". After the election, he remained Minister for Children and Families.
