= Tracey Vallois =

Jersey politician and charity executive

Minister for Education
- In office 7 June 2018 – 11 January 2021
- Preceded by: Rod Bryans
- Succeeded by: Jeremy Maçon (Note: As Minister for Children and Education.)

Deputy Chief Minister of Jersey
- In office 7 June 2018 – 12 December 2018
- Preceded by: John Le Fondré
- Succeeded by: Lyndon Farnham

Senator
- In office 1 June 2018 – 27 June 2022

Deputy for St John
- In office November 2014 – 1 June 2018

Deputy for St Saviour No. 2
- In office December 2008 – November 2014

Personal details
- Born: Tracey Anne Vallois
- Party: Independent

Tracey Anne Le Brocq (née Vallois) is a Jersey charity executive and former politician. As Tracey Vallois, she was a member of the States Assembly from 2008 to 2022, serving successively as a Deputy for St Saviour and St John, and as a Senator. She was Minister for Education from 2018 until 2021 and briefly served as Deputy Chief Minister of Jersey in 2018.

== Political career ==
Vallois was first elected to the States Assembly in the 2008 Jersey general election as a Deputy for St Saviour No. 2, and was re-elected in the 2011 election. In the 2014 election, she was elected as Deputy for St John.

Following the 2014 election, Vallois was appointed Assistant Minister for Treasury and Resources by Chief Minister Ian Gorst. She resigned from the role in November 2015, saying that she was frustrated by a lack of action within the Council of Ministers and would return to backbench politics. Vallois was active in scrutiny work, including reviews concerned with higher education funding, income support and criminal justice.

In the 2018 Jersey general election, Vallois was elected as a Senator, topping the island-wide senatorial poll. Following the election, she was appointed Minister for Education in the administration of Chief Minister John Le Fondré. She also served briefly as Deputy Chief Minister of Jersey and chair of the States Employment Board, before stepping down from those two roles in December 2018 to focus on the education portfolio.

As Education Minister, Vallois's portfolio included early-years policy and workforce development. In 2019, she established an Early Years Policy Development Board to review nursery funding. In December 2020, she announced plans to increase funded nursery education for three- and four-year-olds from 20 to 30 hours a week from September 2021. During her tenure, the Government also announced a new BA Social Work degree at University College Jersey, developed following recommendations of the Independent Jersey Care Inquiry.

Vallois resigned as Education Minister in January 2021 after disagreeing with the Council of Ministers over the reopening of schools during the COVID-19 pandemic in Jersey. She then joined the Children, Education and Home Affairs Scrutiny Panel, the Public Accounts Committee and the Privileges and Procedures Committee. She chaired the Privileges and Procedures Committee's Democratic Accountability and Governance Sub-Committee, which reviewed accountability in Jersey's ministerial system of government.

Vallois did not stand in the 2022 Jersey general election, ending a 14-year career in the States Assembly.

== Charity work ==
In September 2022, under her married name Tracey Le Brocq, she became the first chief executive of Jersey Action Against Rape, a charity providing support and counselling to survivors of rape and sexual abuse.
