= Kirsten Morel =

Jersey politician

Deputy Kirsten Morel

Minister for Economic Development
- Incumbent
- Assumed office 12 July 2022
- Preceded by: Lyndon Farnham
- Constituency: Jersey

Deputy for St John, St Lawrence, and Trinity
- Incumbent
- Assumed office 27 June 2022
- Serving with: Hilary Jeune; Elaine Millar; Andy Howell
- Majority: 2688 (21.0%)

Deputy Chief Minister of Jersey
- In office 12 July 2022 – 6 February 2024
- Chief Minister: Kristina Moore
- Preceded by: Lyndon Farnham
- Succeeded by: Tom Binet
Previous seats in the States Assembly
Deputy for St Lawrence
In office
1 June 2018 – 27 June 2022
- Serving with: Gregory Guida
- Majority: 1499 (50.0%)

Personal details
- Born: Kirsten Morel Jersey
- Party: Independent
- Spouse: Alex
- Children: 1 daughter

Kirsten Morel is a Jersey politician who has served as a Deputy for St John, St Lawrence and Trinity since 27 June 2022. Morel was first elected to the States Assembly in the 2018 Jersey General Election, where he was elected as a Deputy for St Lawrence. During his first term in government, Morel was appointed as an assistant Minister for Economic Development.

Following his successful re-election in the 2022 Jersey General Election, Morel was appointed as the Minister for Economic Development and Deputy Chief Minister by Kristina Moore. Following a successful vote of no confidence against the Moore government, Morel was replaced as Deputy Chief Minister by Deputy Tom Binet.
