= Patrick J. D. Ryan =

Patrick John Dennis Ryan

Deputy
- In office November 2011 – November 2014
- Constituency: St John
- Majority: 528 (45%)

Deputy
- In office 2005–2008
- Constituency: St Helier No. 1
- Majority: 605

Deputy
- In office December 2002 – 2005
- Constituency: St Helier No. 1
- Majority: 720

Patrick Ryan is a former Jersey politician. He was a member of the States Assembly from 2002 to 2008 and 2011 to 2014.

== Political career ==
Ryan was elected as Deputy of St Helier No. 1 in 2002 and served until 2008. He stood unsuccessfully for Deputy of St John in the 2008 election and a by-election for one senatorial seat in 2010. He was elected as Deputy of St John in 2011, returning to the States Assembly. He did not stand for re-election in 2014.

Ryan served as President of the Committee for Postal Administration from 2002 to 2005, and also on the Economic Development Committee.

After the introduction of ministerial government in 2005, Ryan was a member of the Corporate Services Scrutiny Panel from 2005 to 2008. From 2011 to 2014 he was Minister for Education, Sport and Culture.

== See also ==
- Council of Ministers of Jersey
