= Bryan Ian Le Marquand =

Jersey politician

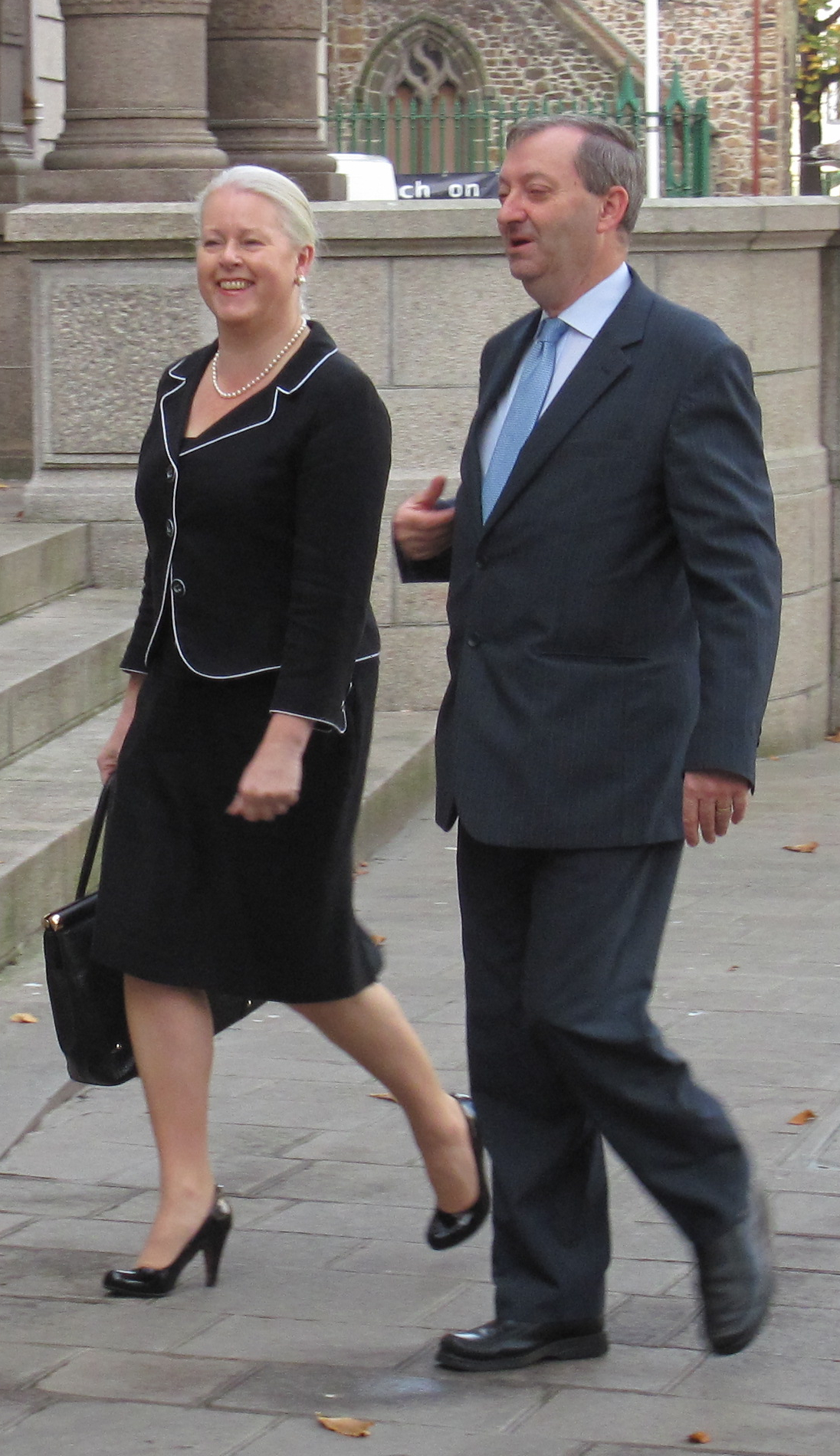
- Ian Le Marquand (right) in 2011

Minister for home affairs
- In office December 2008 – 2014
- Constituency: Jersey

Senator
- In office December 2008 – 2014
- Constituency: Jersey
- Majority: 14,238 (12.35%)

Personal details
- Born: 18 September 1951 (age 74) Jersey
- Spouse: Doreen Smith
- Children: Two
- Occupation: Lawyer
- Website: Ianlemarquand

Bryan Ian Le Marquand (born 18 September 1951), commonly known as Ian Le Marquand, is a former Jersey politician, lawyer and judge.

== Early life ==
Le Marquand was educated at Jersey High School, Victoria College Preparatory, Victoria College, and The College of Law.

== Legal career ==
Le Marquand qualified as a Jersey advocate in 1977, becoming a partner of Le Marquand & Backhurst, where he remained until 1988. He was appointed Judicial Greffier in 1990 and Master of the Royal Court in 1997. From 1999 until his retirement from the judiciary in 2008, he served as the chief magistrate.

== Political career ==
After retiring as magistrate, Le Marquand was elected a senator in the 2008 Jersey general election. During his six year term of office, he served as Minister for Home Affairs from 2008 until 2014, and Deputy Chief Minister from 2011 to 2014 under chief minister Ian Gorst. He withdraw from the contest to become Chief Minister in 2011.

In 2011, Le Marquand was the only States member to vote against civil partnerships for same sex couples, arguing in favour of 'the maintenance of family values in a traditional sense'. In 2014, he also opposed the introduction of same-sex marriage in Jersey, supporting a delay before legislation was brought forward.

Le Marquand did not contest the 2014 election. In 2016, he returned to a judicial role as a member of the Social Security Tribunal.

== See also ==
- Courts of Jersey
- Council of Ministers of Jersey
