= 2000 Jersey by-elections =

The following by elections for Deputy took place in 2000 in Jersey.

== St. Helier No. 1 District ==
Election date: May 2000

- Judy Martin 190 votes
- Harry Cole 182 votes
- David Pipon 165 votes
- Geno Gouveia 134 votes
- Chris Whitworth 36 votes
