= Tom Binet =

Deputy Chief Minister
- Incumbent
- Assumed office 2 February 2024

Minister for Health and Social Services
- Incumbent
- Assumed office 30 January 2024

Deputy for St. Saviour (2022–2026), Senator (Island-wide) (2026–)
- Incumbent
- Assumed office 22 June 2022

Tom Binet is a Jersey politician and former businessman who serves as Deputy Chief Minister and Minister for Health and Social Services, representing St. Saviour in the States Assembly since 2022.

== Early life ==
Public information about Tom Binet's early life is limited, but he is known to have worked for many years in Jersey's agricultural and farming sector before later becoming involved in property and business activities.

== Philanthropy ==
Binet is known, within the island, for funding and running local mental health charity Focus on Mental Illness, along with his sister Rose Binet. Since he became Minister, to address the conflict of interest between his Ministerial duties and his obligations of being a trustee of the charity, he has relinquished all administrative control of the charity he founded, but continues to make substantial donations to it for its daily operations to continue.

== Career in politics ==
Tom Binet entered Jersey politics in 2022 when he was elected as Deputy for St. Saviour in the States Assembly. Soon after entering government, he was appointed Minister for Infrastructure, where he became involved in transport, public works, and long-term infrastructure planning. During this period he developed a reputation as an independent and outspoken politician who was willing to challenge colleagues and established government practices.

In January 2024, Binet became Minister for Health and Social Services and was later appointed Deputy Chief Minister under Chief Minister Lyndon Farnham. In these senior roles he has focused heavily on healthcare reform, including plans to modernise Jersey's health care system and improve long-term sustainability. He has also played a major role in the development of assisted dying legislation, making him one of the most prominent political figures in recent Jersey public policy debates.
