= State Assembly =

State Assembly is the name given to various legislatures, especially lower houses or full legislatures in states in federal systems of government.

== Channel Islands ==
States Assembly is the name of the legislature of the Bailiwick of Jersey. The Bailiwick of Guernsey has a similar assembly named the States of Deliberation.

== United States ==
Examples include:

- California State Assembly
- New York State Assembly
- Wisconsin State Assembly

== Russia ==
- State Assembly of the Republic of Bashkortostan
- State Assembly of the Mari El Republic
- State Assembly of the Republic of Mordovia
- State Assembly of the Altai Republic
- State Assembly of the Republic of Adygea
- State Assembly of the Republic of Bashkortostan
- State Assembly of the Sakha Republic

== Other states ==
- State Assembly of Kedah, Malaysia
