= Paul Routier =

Politician (born 1949)

Paul Francis Routier
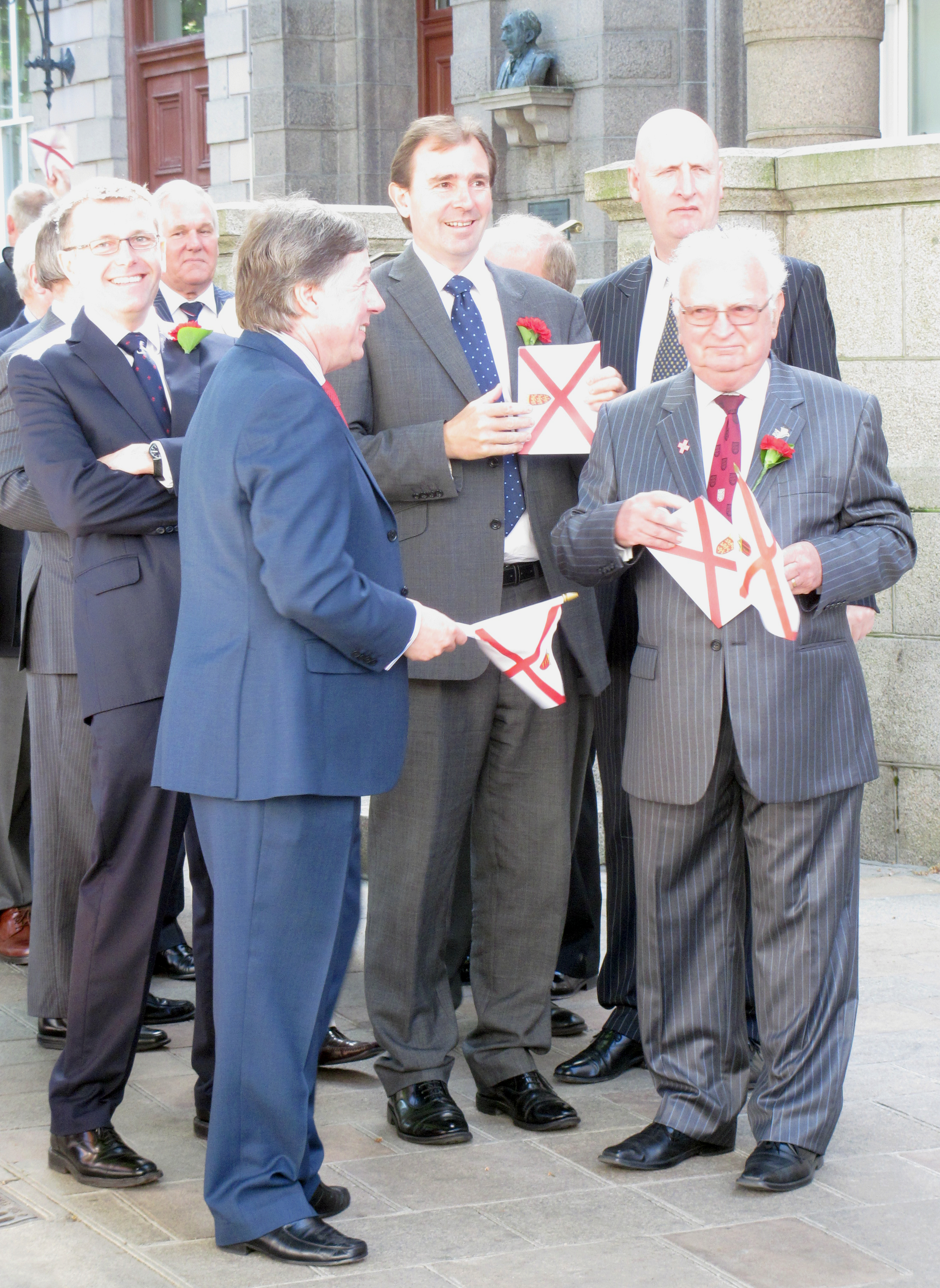
- (front left, in blue)

Senator
- Incumbent
- Assumed office November 2008
- Constituency: Jersey
- Majority: 8,775

Senator
- In office November 2002 – November 2008
- Constituency: Jersey
- Majority: 11,687

Deputy
- In office 1999–2002
- Constituency: St Helier

Personal details
- Born: Jersey
- Spouse: Married
- Children: 3
- Website: http://www.paulroutier.com/

Paul Routier is a member of the States of Jersey, England, since he was elected in 1993, and is an Assistant Minister to the Chief Minister of Jersey since 25 November 2011.

== Political career ==
Routier was first elected as Deputy for St Helier No. 2 district in the 1993 elections and served for three terms (nine years) before being elected as Senator in 2002. He was re-elected in 2008 in 4th place with 8,775 votes.

He was Jersey's Minister for Employment and Social Security until 11 December 2008, when he was replaced with Deputy Ian Gorst. He was proposed as nominee for Minister for Health by Chief Minister Elect Terry Le Sueur, but lost to Senator James Perchard. After that, he was proposed as nominee for Minister for Education, but lost that election to Deputy James Reed. He was subsequently appointed as Assistant Minister to the Chief Minister, and Assistant Minister on Economic Development.

== Voluntary work ==
Routier is heavily involved in working to support those with learning difficulties including the charities Jersey Mencap and Les Amis Incorporated.

He is a school governor of De La Salle College, Jersey

== Parish municipality ==
Paul Routier is Procureur for the Vingtaine de la Ville of St. Helier.
