= Mary Le Hegarat =

Jersey politician

Minister for the Environment
- Incumbent
- Assumed office 30 June 2026

Minister for Justice and Home Affairs
- In office 30 January 2024 – 2026
- Preceded by: Helen Miles
- Succeeded by: Helen Miles

Member of the States Assembly
- Incumbent
- Assumed office 2026

Deputy of St Helier North
- In office 2022–2026

Deputy of St Helier No. 3 and 4
- In office 2018–2022

Personal details
- Party: Independent

Mary Rose Le Hegarat is a Jersey politician and former police officer who has served as a Senator in the States Assembly and as Minister for the Environment since 2026. She is an independent politician. She previously served as a Deputy for St Helier No. 3 and 4 from 2018 to 2022, and for St Helier North from 2022 to 2026. She was Minister for Justice and Home Affairs from 2024 to 2026.

== Early life and career ==
Le Hegarat was born in Jersey and educated at Les Landes School and Les Quennevais School. Before entering politics, she worked in Jersey's tax department, Jersey Airport, the Department of Agriculture and Fisheries and local accountancy firms. She joined the States of Jersey Police in 1989, becoming Jersey's first female inspector and later serving as acting chief inspector.

== Political career ==
Le Hegarat was first elected to the States Assembly at the 2018 Jersey general election, as one of the Deputies for St Helier No. 3 and 4. During her first term she chaired the Health and Social Security Scrutiny Panel. She was also Vice-chair of the Scrutiny Liaison Committee, and member of the Planning Committee, Legal Advisory Panel, Policy and Procedure Committee, Future Hospital Review Panel and was involved in the Jersey branch of the Commonwealth Parliamentary Association.

At the 2022 Jersey general election, Le Hegarat was elected as an independent Deputy for the newly created constituency of St Helier North. On 30 January 2024, following the formation of a new Council of Ministers led by Lyndon Farnham, she took up the post of Minister for Justice and Home Affairs.

At the 2026 Jersey general election, Le Hegarat stood as an independent candidate for Senator and was elected as one of the nine island-wide members of the States Assembly. She was subsequently selected as Minister for the Environment in Farnham's second Council of Ministers.
