= Leonard Norman =

British politician (1947–2021)

Len Norman
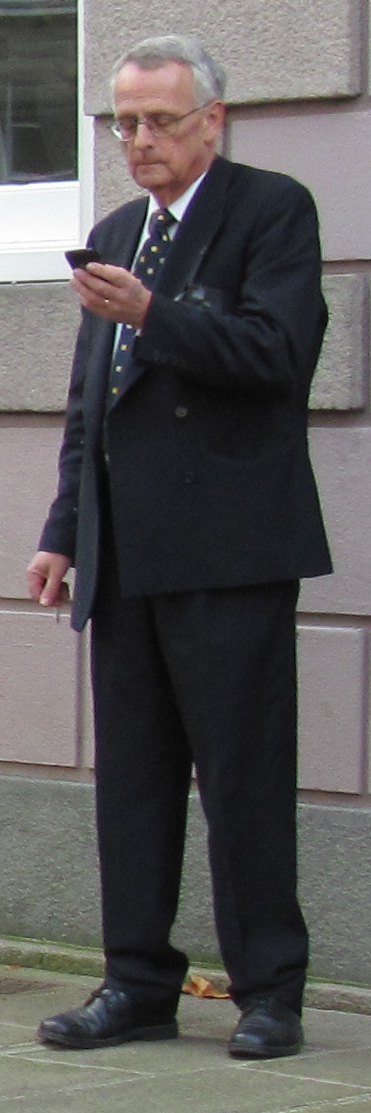
- Norman in 2011

Connétable
- In office 2008–2021
- Preceded by: Derek Gray
- Constituency: St Clement, Jersey
- Majority: 1,593 (60.92%)

Senator
- In office 1996–2007
- Constituency: St Clement

Deputy
- In office 1983–1996
- Constituency: St Clement

Personal details
- Born: Leonard Norman; 1947
- Died: June 1, 2021 (aged 73) Jersey
- Spouse(s): Marion, Rosemary
- Children: Two

Leonard Norman (1947 – 1 June 2021) was a Jersey politician, and Connétable of Saint Clement. He was originally elected to the States of Jersey in 1983, as a Deputy.

== Biography ==
Len Norman was born in 1947 in Jersey. He was educated at Beaulieu and then at De La Salle College, Jersey.

He was the President of the Jersey Sports Council, President of the Jersey Friends of the Anthony Nolan Bone Marrow Trust and Patron of St Clement Sports Club.

== Political career ==
He was first elected to the States of Jersey as Deputy of Saint Clement in 1983. In the Senatorial election of 1996 he was elected in 3rd place with 11,017 votes.

In the States, he has been President of the Education Committee, Vice-president of the Harbours and Airport Committee, and Vice-President of the Special Committee on the Composition and Election of the States. In 2005, he was beaten in elections to the Council of Ministers of Jersey by Guy de Faye to become Minister for Transport and Technical Services.

In 2007 he announced his intention to stand for the position of Constable of the parish of St Clement in 2008 following the announcement of the incumbent Derek Gray that he would step down at that time. In the 2008 Jersey general election he won the Constableship.

He died on 1 June 2021 at the age of 73.
