= Elaine Millar =

Jersey politician and former Viscount

Minister for Social Security
- Incumbent
- Assumed office 30 June 2026
- Monarch: Charles III
- Lieutenant Governor: Sir Jerry Kyd
- Preceded by: Lyndsay Feltham

Minister for Treasury and Resources
- In office 30 January 2024 – 19 June 2026
- Preceded by: Ian Gorst
- Succeeded by: Alan Maclean

Minister for Social Security
- In office 12 July 2022 – 30 January 2024
- Preceded by: Judy Martin
- Succeeded by: Lyndsay Feltham

Senator
- Incumbent
- Assumed office 19 June 2026

Deputy of the States Assembly for St John, St Lawrence and Trinity
- In office 27 June 2022 – 19 June 2026 Serving with Kirsten Morel, Hilary Jeune, Andy Howell

Personal details
- Party: Independent
- Occupation: Politician, advocate

Elaine Millar is a Jersey politician, advocate and former court official who has served as Minister for Social Security since June 2026. She was elected as a Senator in the 2026 Jersey general election, having previously served in the States Assembly as a Deputy for St John, St Lawrence and Trinity from 2022 to 2026. She was Minister for Social Security from 2022 to 2024 and Minister for Treasury and Resources from 2024 to 2026.

== Career before politics ==
Millar is a Jersey advocate. Before entering politics she worked in law and financial services, including as a partner at Mourant du Feu & Jeune and as a director of RBS/NatWest International Group.

In July 2015 Millar became the first woman to be appointed Viscount of the Royal Court of Jersey. The office is responsible for a range of court enforcement functions, as well as acting as coroner and administering désastre bankruptcy proceedings. She served as Viscount until March 2022.

== Political career ==
Millar stood as an independent candidate for Deputy in the newly created district of St John, St Lawrence and Trinity at the 2022 Jersey general election. She was elected and was sworn in as a member of the States Assembly on 27 June 2022.

In July 2022 she was appointed Minister for Social Security in the government of Chief Minister Kristina Moore. During that term, the States Assembly approved her proposition to increase Income Support component rates from January 2024.

After Moore's government lost a vote of no confidence in January 2024, Millar was appointed Minister for Treasury and Resources in the new Council of Ministers formed by Chief Minister Lyndon Farnham. She also served as Assistant Minister for External Relations and Financial Services.

At the 2026 Jersey general election, Millar stood for one of the reintroduced island-wide Senator seats. She was elected fourth, with 14,208 votes. On 30 June 2026 she was elected unopposed as Minister for Social Security in Farnham's post-election Council of Ministers.
