= Alan J. H. Maclean =

Alan Maclean

Minister for Treasury and Resources
- Incumbent
- Assumed office 30 June 2026
- Preceded by: Elaine Millar

Senator of the States Assembly
- Incumbent
- Assumed office 12 June 2026
- Constituency: Jersey

Minister for Treasury and Resources
- In office 6 November 2014 – June 2018
- Preceded by: Philip Ozouf
- Succeeded by: Susan Pinel

Minister for Economic Development
- In office December 2008 – November 2014
- Preceded by: Philip Ozouf
- Succeeded by: Lyndon Farnham

Senator of the States Assembly
- In office 8 December 2008 – June 2018
- Constituency: Jersey

Deputy of the States Assembly
- In office 5 December 2005 – 8 December 2008
- Constituency: St Helier No. 2

Personal details
- Born: Alan John Henry Maclean; 1963 (age 62–63)
- Party: Independent
- Occupation: Businessman, politician
- Website: alanmaclean.je

Alan John Henry Maclean (born 1963) is a Jersey politician. He served in the States Assembly from 2005 to 2018, first as a deputy and later as a senator, and was elected again as a senator in the 2026 general election. He held ministerial office as Minister for Economic Development and Minister for Treasury and Resources.

== Early life and business career ==
Maclean was born in 1963. He was educated at St Michael’s Preparatory School, before studying at Kelly College in Devon.

Before entering politics, Maclean worked in marketing and public relations in the United Kingdom and Jersey. In 1997, he co-founded Mulberry Estates.

In 2014, Maclean founded the Oscar Maclean Foundation, a Jersey charity supporting young cancer patients and children with other serious illnesses.

After leaving the States Assembly in 2018, Maclean returned to the private sector and held non-executive and corporate governance roles in Jersey.

== Political career ==
Maclean was first elected to the States Assembly in November 2005 as Deputy for St Helier No. 2. He was appointed Assistant Minister for Economic Development.

In the 2008 general election, Maclean was elected as a senator. He was subsequently appointed Minister for Economic Development. As minister, his portfolio included financial services, tourism, ports, transport links, business development and inward investment. During his term, the States took forward changes including the integration of Jersey Airport and Jersey Harbours, the creation of Jersey Business and Digital Jersey, and reforms to tourism promotion arrangements through the creation of Visit Jersey.

Maclean was re-elected as a senator in the 2014 general election. He was subsequently appointed Minister for Treasury and Resources. As minister, he brought forward the Medium Term Financial Plan and budget measures concerned with public spending, corporate taxation, high-value residents and student finance.

In early 2018, Maclean announced his decision to step away from politics, as he wished to spend more time with his young family. He returned to politics in the 2026 general election when elected a senator.

== See also ==
- Council of Ministers of Jersey
