= Terry Le Main =

Terence John Le Main
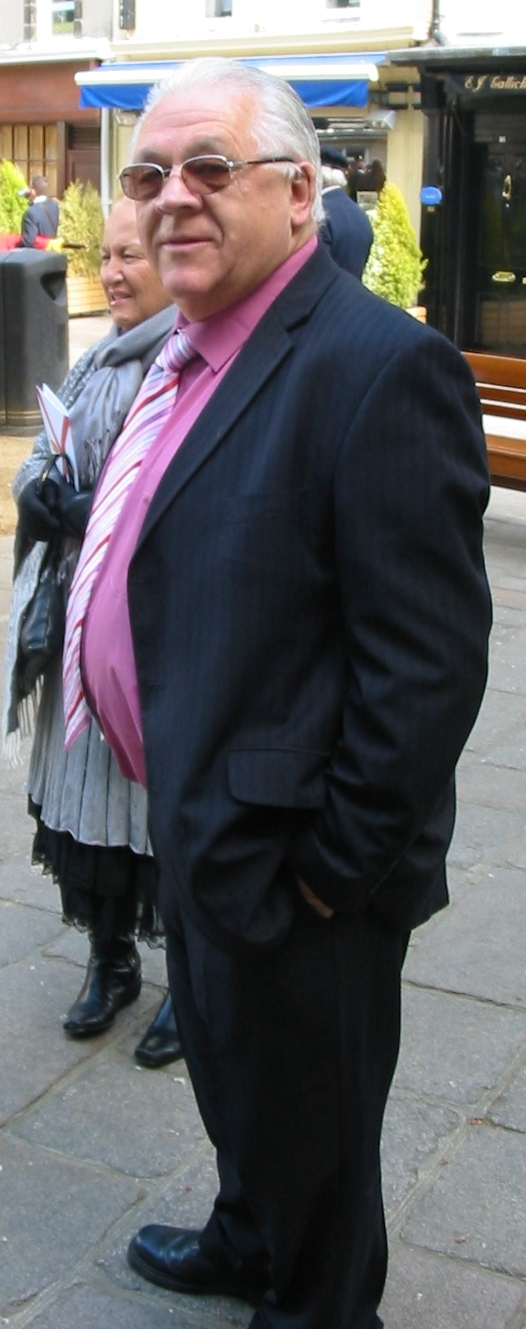

Minister of Housing
- In office Dec 2005 – Jun 2010
- Preceded by: None
- Constituency: States Assembly
- Majority: Unopposed

Senator
- In office Nov 2005 – Nov 2008
- Constituency: Jersey

Personal details
- Born: November 1939 (age 86)

Terry Le Main (born 1939) is a former Jersey politician. He served as a member of the States Assembly from 1978 to 2011 and held office as Minister for Housing.

== Biography ==
Terence John Le Main was born in November 1939 in Jersey. He was educated at Hautlieu School.

== Electoral history ==
He was first elected to the States of Jersey as Deputy of Saint Helier No. 2 in 1978 (re-elected 1984). He was elected as Senator in 1994 and re-elected in 1990.

In the 1996 Senatorial election he was ousted in 7th place with 9,578 votes. He then successfully stood for election is his former Deputy seat in St Helier No. 2 in 1996, topping the poll with 669 votes, and topped the poll again in 1999 (782 votes) and was re-elected in 2002.

He stood again as Senator in 2005 and was returned to the Senatorial benches in 4th place with 12,159 votes.

Le Main elected not to stand as Senator in the 2011 Election but again contested the St Helier No. 2 District seeking election as a Deputy. He polled 593 votes, 101 behind Geoff Southern, and failed to gain election.

== Committee and ministerial roles ==
Prior to the introduction of ministerial government, Le Main served on several States Assembly committees, including as president of the Gambling Control Committee and first president of the Sport, Leisure and Recreation Committee. He was also Deputy Chairman of the Overseas Aid Committee.

He was president of the Housing Committee from 1999 and, with the advent of ministerial government, became Minister for Housing from 2005. He resigned in 2010 over allegations of his relationship with a property developer. He denied the allegations, and was cleared in 2012 by the States of Jersey police due to lack of evidence.
