= Rob Duhamel =

Jersey politician (died 2021)

Robert Charles Duhamel
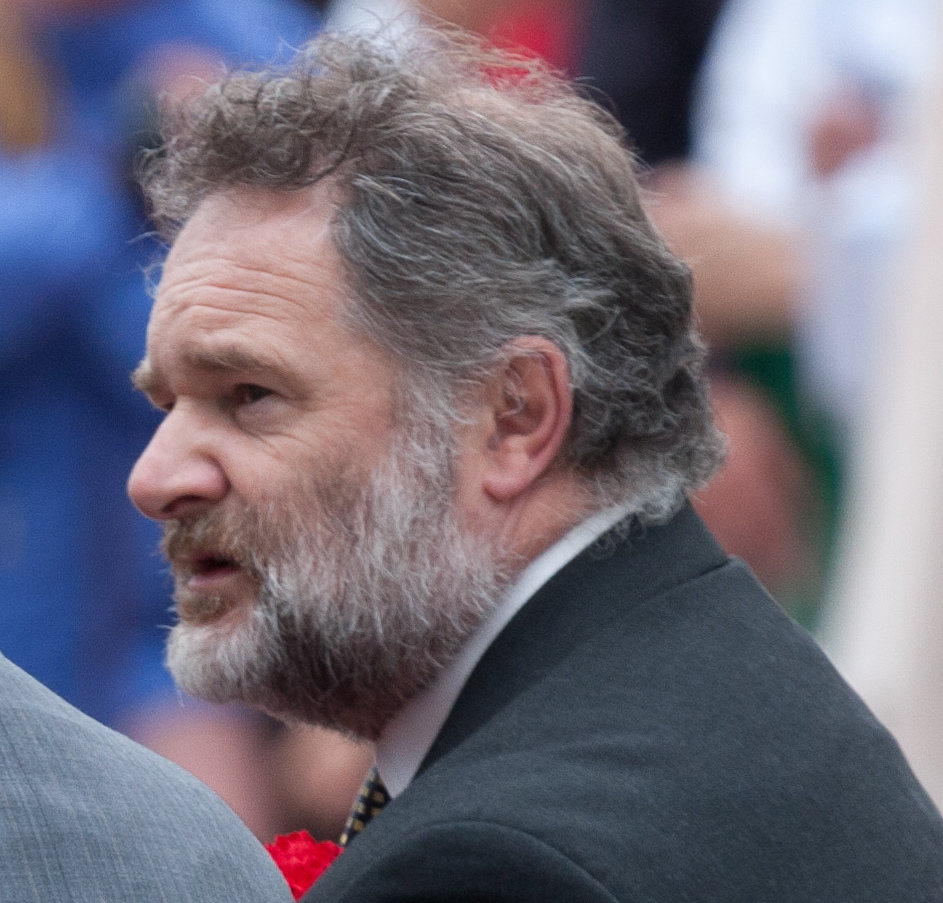
- Duhamel in 2012

Planning and Environment Minister
- In office 2011–2014
- Preceded by: Freddie Cohen

Deputy
- In office 9 December 1993 – 15 October 2014
- Constituency: St. Saviour District 1

Personal details
- Born: 1954/1955
- Died: September 2021 (aged 66)

Robert Charles "Rob" Duhamel (1954/1955 – September 2021) was a Jersey politician. He served as a member of the States of Jersey between 1993 and 2014, and as Planning and Environment Minister.

== Biography ==
Duhamel was first elected to the States in 1993 in St. Saviour District 1. He was re-elected in 1996, 1999, 2002, 2005, 2008 and 2011. He lost his seat in the 2014 elections.
