= Chief Minister of Jersey =

Head of government of Jersey

- Premier/ère Ministre de Jersey (French); Chef Minnistre dé Jèrri (Jèrriais)
- Coat of arms of Jersey

- Flag of Jersey

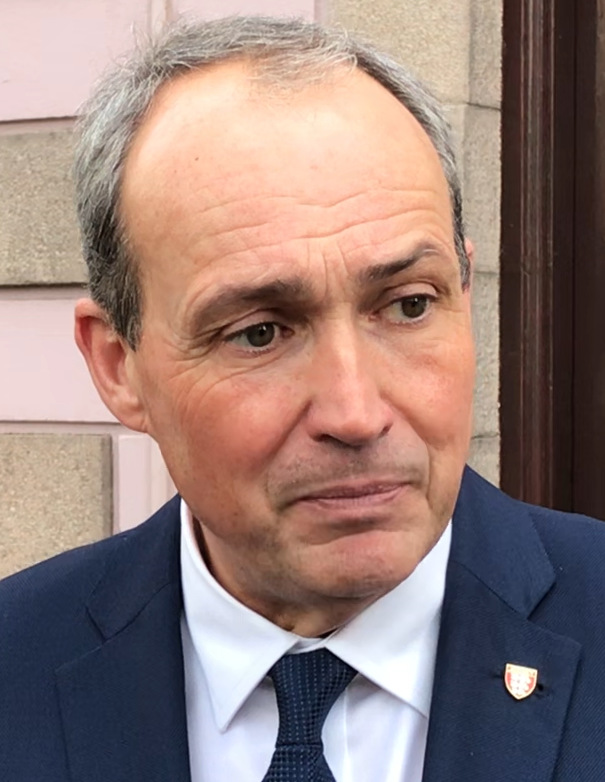
- Incumbent; Lyndon Farnham since 30 January 2024
- Government of Jersey; States Assembly
- Status: Head of government
- Member of: Council of Ministers; British–Irish Council
- Nominator: States Assembly
- Appointer: States Assembly
- Term length: No term length The Chief minister is nominated by the States Assembly following a general election or resignation of the previous chief minister
- Inaugural holder: Frank Walker
- Formation: 8 December 2005; 20 years ago
- Deputy: Deputy Chief Minister
- Salary: £46,600 annually (as a Member of the States Assembly)
- Website: https://www.gov.je

The Chief Minister of Jersey (French: Premier/ère Ministre de Jersey; Jèrriais: Chef Minnistre dé Jèrri) is the head of government of Jersey, leading the Council of Ministers, which makes up part of the Government of Jersey. The head of government is not directly elected by the people but rather by the legislature, the States Assembly.

The post was created by reforms to the machinery of government to change from a consensus style of government by committee of the whole States of Jersey to a system of cabinet government under a Chief Minister.

== List of Chief Ministers ==
Portrait	Chief Minister Seat	Term of office			Party	Mandate	Deputy Chief Minister Party
Portrait	Chief Minister Seat	Start	End	Duration	Party	Mandate	Deputy Chief Minister Party
Frank Walker	Frank Walker; Senator	8 December 2005	12 December 2008	3 years, 4 days	Independent	2005	Terry Le Sueur; Independent
Terry Le Sueur	Terry Le Sueur; Senator	12 December 2008	18 November 2011	2 years, 341 days	Independent	2008	Philip Ozouf; Independent
Ian Gorst	Ian Gorst; Senator	18 November 2011	7 June 2018	6 years, 201 days	Independent	2011	Ian Le Marquand; Independent
Ian Gorst	Ian Gorst; Senator	18 November 2011	7 June 2018	6 years, 201 days	Independent	2014	Andrew Green; Independent
	John Le Fondré; Senator	7 June 2018	11 July 2022	4 years, 34 days	Independent	2018	Lyndon Farnham; Independent
	John Le Fondré; Senator	7 June 2018	11 July 2022	4 years, 34 days	Jersey Alliance	2018	Lyndon Farnham; Independent
Kristina Moore	Kristina Moore; Deputy for St Mary, St Ouen, and St Peter	11 July 2022	30 January 2024	1 year, 203 days	Better Way	2022	Kirsten Morel; Independent
Lyndon Farnham	Lyndon Farnham; Deputy for St Mary, St Ouen, and St Peter	30 January 2024	Incumbent	2 years, 239 days	Independent	—	Tom Binet; Independent

== 2000s ==
2005 election

The first chief minister of Jersey was elected on 5 December 2005 following the 2005 Jersey general election.

Two candidates were nominated on 1 December 2005:

- Senator Stuart Syvret
- Senator Frank Walker

In a secret ballot on Monday, 5 December 2005, the States of Jersey elected Senator Walker to be the first chief minister in Jersey history, receiving 38 votes to Senator Syvret's 14 votes of support, an unsurprising result for the latter who considered himself the underdog (a concern he had expressed during the preceding weekend in an interview with Channel Television).

2008 election

Senator Terry Le Sueur was elected chief minister on 8 December 2008 following the 2008 Jersey general election.

In a secret ballot, the States of Jersey voted for Senator Le Sueur with 36 votes. The only other challenger, Senator Alan Breckon, received 17 votes.

== 2010s ==
2011 election

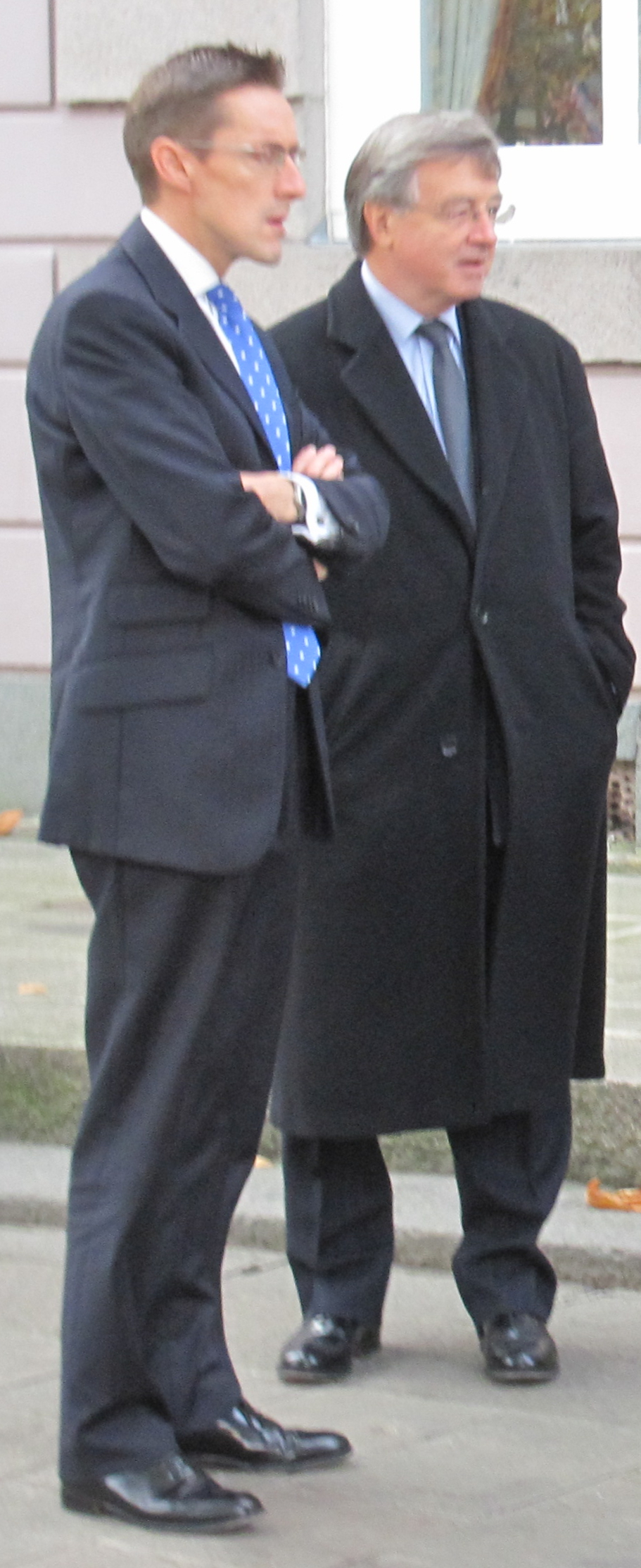
Chief ministerial candidates Senator Ian Gorst and Senator Sir Philip Bailhache on 14 November 2011, just before the vote.

Senator Ian Gorst was elected chief minister in an open ballot on 14 November 2011, beating Senator Sir Philip Bailhache 27 votes to 24. He nominated his preferred candidates for ministerial office on 16 November 2011, and took office as chief minister following the completion of elections of ministers on 18 November 2011.

2014 election

2018 election

Senator John Le Fondré was voted in as Jersey's fourth chief minister by 30 votes to 19, defeating Senator Ian Gorst, who was looking to serve for a third term in the role. Gorst continued to serve on the Council of Ministers, taking over the external relations portfolio.

Senator Lyndon Farnham also declared an interest in standing as chief minister, but withdrew from the race to support Senator Le Fondré prior to the vote in the States Assembly – opting to remain as Minister for Economic Development instead.

== 2020s ==
=== 2022 general election ===
In January 2022, former Senator Sir Philip Bailhache announced he was seeking a return to front-line politics, and would stand as the Jersey Liberal Conservatives' candidate for Chief Minister if he was voted back in. He previously ran for the position in 2011.

The following month, the incumbent Chief Minister, Senator John Le Fondré, announced he would be standing as a candidate for the Jersey Alliance party. But he was not chosen as the party's candidate for leader, with members backing Sir Mark Boleat instead. It meant that even if Senator Le Fondré was re-elected, he would only serve one term as Chief Minister.

In May, Senator Kristina Moore, who served as Home Affairs Minister during Ian Gorst's premiership, announced her intention to stand for Chief Minister if re-elected.

For the 2022 general election, the title of Senator was abolished and all candidates stood as Deputies or Constables. As Senators were the only position to be elected using an island-wide vote, they traditionally took on the Ministerial roles in Jersey's government. 2022 would be the first time a Chief Minister would be appointed without an island-wide mandate since the position was established in 2005.

Islanders went to the polls in June, with John Le Fondré's Alliance party suffering a bruising defeat, meaning neither he nor his party leader, Sir Mark Boleat, were in a position to stand for Chief Minister. Candidates aligned to political parties were not as popular with the electorate as independent candidates, so Sir Philip Bailhache did not have enough support from States members to put himself forward.

The only party to increase their number of seats in the Assembly was Reform Jersey; this led Deputy Sam Mézec to announce his intention to stand as the party's candidate for Chief Minister.

On Friday 1 July, States members elected Deputy Moore as Jersey's first female Chief Minister. Her picks for the Council of Ministers were all backed in the States Assembly, including retaining Ian Gorst as Treasury Minister.

Candidate	States Members' vote 1 July 2022	
Candidate	Votes	%
Kristina Moore	39	79.6
Sam Mézec	10	20.4
Kristina Moore elected

== Deputy Chief Minister of Jersey ==
The office of the Deputy Chief Minister of Jersey was created in December 2005. Deputy Chief Minister assists the Chief Minister in managing the government and may take on specific responsibilities as assigned. This role is part of the Council of Ministers, which coordinates policies and administration for the government. As of January 2024, the current Deputy Chief Minister is Tom Binet, who serves as the Minister for Health and Social Services.

== Assistant Chief Minister of Jersey ==
The Assistant Chief Minister supports the Chief Minister in coordinating the functions of the Council of Ministers and may have specific responsibilities assigned to them. They assist in policy development and implementation across various government areas. As of June 2026, the Assistant Chief Ministers of Jersey are:

- Senator Helen Miles – Assistant Chief Minister (also Minister for Justice and Home Affairs)
- Deputy Malcolm Ferey – Assistant Chief Minister (also Minister for Housing)
- Deputy Rose Binet – Assistant Chief Minister (also Assistant Minister for Health and Social Services)

== See also ==
- List of current heads of government in the United Kingdom and dependencies
- Government of Jersey
