= Judy Martin (politician) =

Jersey politician

Judith Ann Martin

Deputy
- In office 2000–2022
- Constituency: St Helier No. 1
- Majority: 190

Minister for Social Security
- In office 2018–2022
- Preceded by: Susan Pinel
- Succeeded by: Elaine Millar

Personal details
- Party: Independent (2000-2005, 2005-2021, 2022-Present); Jersey Democratic Alliance (2005); Jersey Alliance (2021-2022)
- Children: 3

Judy Ann Martin is a former Jersey politician who served in the States Assembly for 22 years. She was first elected as a Deputy for St Helier No.1 (South) in the Jersey by-election of 2000. Martin was later re-elected for this role a further 6 times, in the Jersey General Elections of 2002, 2005, 2008, 2011, 2014 and 2018.

She was appointed as an Assistant Minister for Health and Social Services in November 2011.

She was appointed as the Minister for Social Security in May 2018, where she navigated through the complex financial and logistical challenges of the 2020 COVID-19 Pandemic.

In the 2022 Jersey General Election, Martin was defeated in the race for Deputy of St Helier South (No.1). She came in 6th place with 496 votes (9.0%), falling short of fourth-placed Deputy David Warr, who received 616 votes (11.2%).

Martin unsuccessfully stood in the 2026 Jersey General Election, where she placed 5th out of 9 candidates for the role of deputy for St Helier South.

== Political career ==
In 2005, Martin stood for election with the newly formed Jersey Democratic Alliance. She left the party shortly afterwards.

=== New police headquarters ===
Martin voiced opposition to the construction of a new HQ for the States of Jersey Police at the proposed Green Street car park site, suggesting it should be built elsewhere.

In 2021, Martin joined the newly formed Jersey Alliance party. She left the party in 2022.

For the 2026 Jersey General Election, Martin was endorsed by Value Jersey.
