= Jeremy Maçon =

Jersey politician

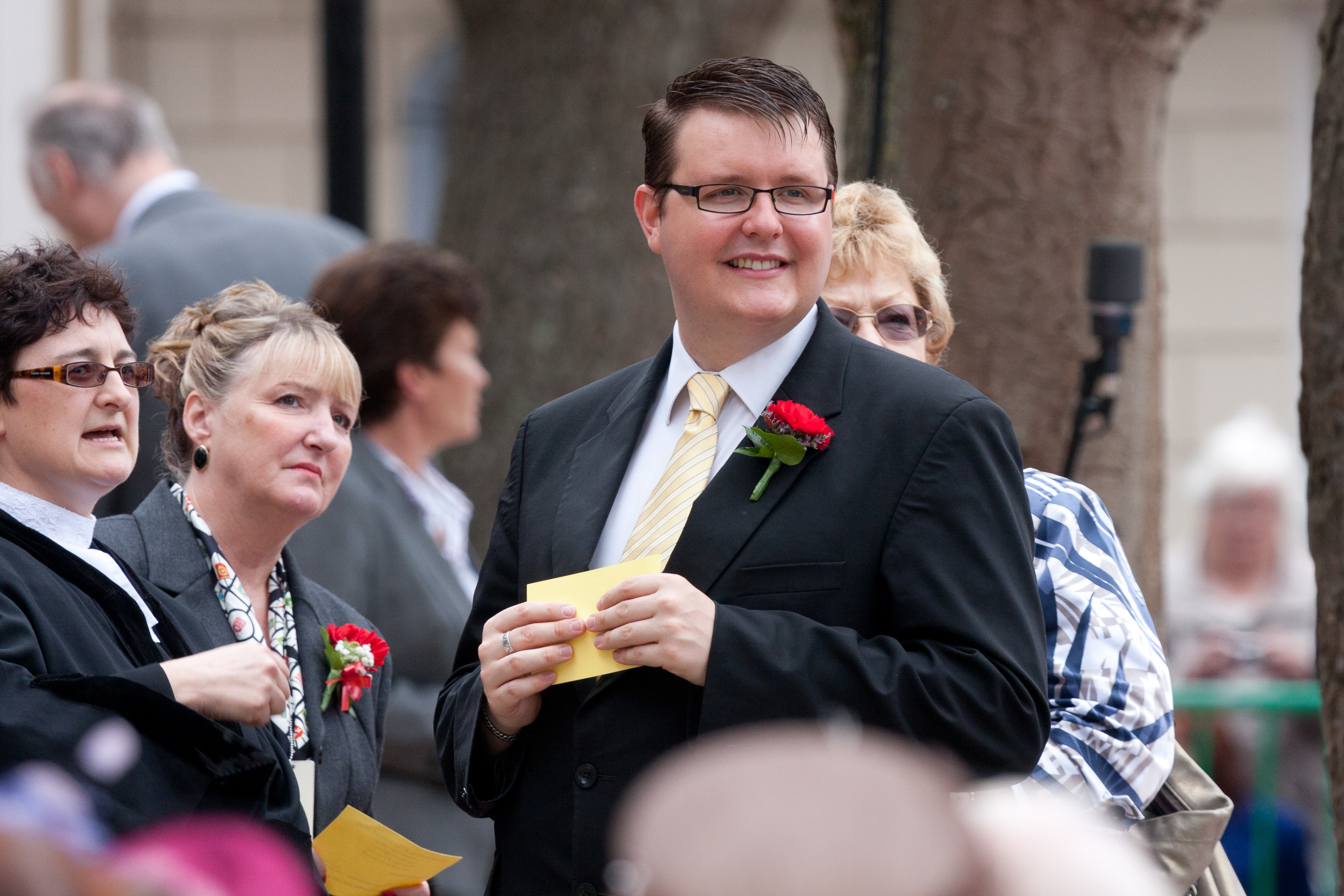
- Jeremy Maçon in 2012

Deputy of St Saviour No. 1
- In office 8 December 2008 – 22 June 2022
- Preceded by: Celia Scott Warren
- Succeeded by: Constituency merged with St Saviour No. 2 & 3
- Constituency: St Saviour No. 1

Minister for Children & Housing
- In office 17 November 2020 – 24 March 2021
- Preceded by: Sam Mézec
- Succeeded by: Scott Wickenden (as Minister for Children & Education); Russell Labey (as Minister for Housing & Communities)

Personal details
- Party: Independent

Jeremy Martin Maçon is a Jersey politician who served as one of the Deputies in the St Saviour No. 1 constituency between 2008 and 2022.

== Education ==
Maçon was educated at La Pouquelaye School, Haute Valleé, Hautlieu School, and Highlands College. He has a degree in Joint Social Sciences from Plymouth University.

== Political career ==
Maçon was an unsuccessful senatorial candidate in the 2008 elections, however he was elected as a Deputy for St Saviour No. 1 district.

On 19 March 2013, Maçon proposed a minimum turnout threshold of 40% of the electorate, in respect of the Jersey electoral reform referendum of 2013 and that if this threshold is not met the result of the referendum should not be used by the Assembly.

In July 2013, Maçon was elected as chairman of the Privileges and Procedures Committee, replacing Connétable Crowcroft who resigned after members rejected reform plans based on the outcome of the referendum.

Maçon stood for re-election in 2022 in the new combined constituency of 'St Saviour'. Of the 12 candidates standing, he received the fewest votes with just 411 people supporting him.

== Police investigation ==
On 24 March 2021, Deputy Maçon was relieved of his duties as Children's Minister while he was being investigatied by the States of Jersey Police for an undisclosed offence. The Chief Minister, Senator John Le Fondré said Deputy Maçon was 'not currently capable of fulfilling his ministerial duties'. Maçon formally resigned from the government three months later but continued in his elected role as a Deputy.

Deputy Maçon maintained his innocence throughout the investigation, stating publicly that he "should make it plain that, despite taking the decision to resign from [his] Ministerial post, [he] do[es] not accept guilt in relation to any allegation", and that his resignation was due to the "considerable negative impact on both me and my family" and he "would not want this continuing situation to be used to undermine... the excellent work being done by this Government."

On Tuesday 31 August 2021, Jersey Police confirmed that the six-month police investigation against Deputy Maçon had not resulted in any charges

On Tuesday 14 September, Maçon spoke publicly for the first time since the beginning of March, thanking friends, family and members of the community for their support during the investigation. During this statement, Maçon stated that he had been the victim of "an extremely vicious and politically motivated attack, designed to smear my character, damage my reputation and hurt me personally". He went on to highlight the importance of following procedure, as he noted that he had been subject to "all manner of vile speculation based on prejudice and bigotry" as he was "put on trial by some sections of the media, together with many on social media, who have taken advantage of a time when I could not defend myself or comment publicly on the situation for legal reasons whilst the investigation was underway".
