= Simon Crowcroft =

Jersey politician

Connétable Simon Crowcroft
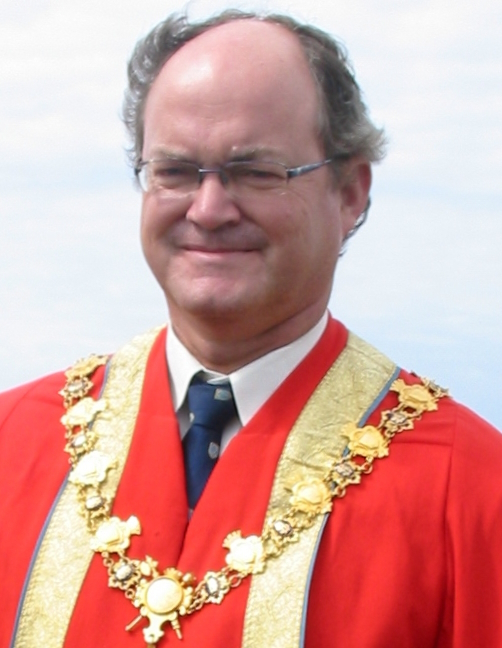

Connétable of Saint Helier
- Incumbent
- Assumed office 14 December 2001
- Preceded by: Bob Le Brocq

Deputy for Saint Helier (No. 2)
- In office 12 December 1996 – 14 December 2001

Associate Member of the British-Irish Parliamentary Assembly

Personal details
- Party: Independent
- Spouse: Angela Crowcroft
- Children: Five
- Occupation: Politician
- Website: Crowcoft States Assembly

Alan Simon Crowcroft is a Jersey politician, Connétable of St Helier, and former teacher. He has been an elected member of the States of Jersey since 1996.

== Background ==
Crowcroft is the son of zoologists Peter Crowcroft and Gillian Godfrey. He was educated at Canford School and Emmanuel College, Cambridge, and received a Diploma in Education from Westminster College, Oxford. After a career in teaching English in Oxford and Jersey, he founded the Jersey School of English in 1991. He is married with five children. He founded the Jersey Pedestrians Association following an accident suffered by his son in St Helier in 1994.

== Political career ==
Crowcroft was first elected to the States of Jersey as a Deputy of St Helier in 1996 as a representative of St Helier District No. 2 constituency. In December 2001, he successfully stood for election as Connétable of St Helier, defeating incumbent Bob Le Brocq. He was re-elected unopposed in December 2004. In January 2008, he defeated Jersey Democratic Alliance candidate, Alvin Aaron. He was again re-elected unopposed in 2011.

Crowcroft supported the creation of the Millennium Town Park in St Helier, which was opened in 2011.

In 2012 Crowcroft completed the signing of a twinning agreement with the Mayor of Funchal, Dr Miguel Albuquerque. St Helier and Madeira have close ties due to a significant number of Madeirans living in Jersey.

=== Parish rates ===
In March 2013, Crowcroft stated that the States of Jersey should pay parish rates on the properties it owns, and that "they would probably be more efficient in their use of property" if they were paying annual rates in the same way as others do. The Treasury Minister, Senator Philip Ozouf, said that the rates payment could be around £1.6m and that there was no provision for it in the budget.

In Jersey, parish rates are normally paid annually by owners or occupiers of land, structures and buildings. These payments are used to pay for each parish's general expenses.

== See also ==
- Parish Assembly
