= Alan Breckon =

Jersey politician

Senator of the States Assembly
- In office 2008–2014
- Constituency: Jersey

Deputy of the States Assembly
- In office 1993–2008
- Constituency: St Saviour No. 2

Personal details
- Party: Independent

Alan Breckon is a Jersey politician and consumer advocate who served in the States Assembly from 1993 to 2014. He represented St Saviour No. 2 as a Deputy before being elected as an island-wide Senator in 2008. He was the first chair of the Jersey Consumer Council and unsuccessfully contested the office of Chief Minister in 2008.

== Political career ==
Breckon was first elected to the States Assembly as a Deputy for St Saviour No. 2 in 1993. He remained a Deputy for 15 years and was chair of the Health, Social Security and Housing Scrutiny Panel following the introduction of ministerial government in 2005. The panel examined government policy in areas including social housing, health services and long-term care for older people.

In the October 2008 election, Breckon was elected as one of six Senators. He placed second in the island-wide poll, receiving 10,273 votes. In December 2008, he stood against Terry Le Sueur in the election for Chief Minister. Le Sueur was elected by 36 votes to Breckon's 17.

Breckon completed his six-year term as Senator in 2014 and did not seek re-election, ending 21 years of continuous service in the Assembly.

== Consumer advocacy ==
Breckon played a role in establishing the Jersey Consumer Council. After an earlier proposal for a council was rejected in 1994, he developed revised proposals through the Trade and Industry Sub-Committee. These informed the scheme approved by the States in April 1995. He became the council's first chair and remained in the position until January 2012.

He also campaigned for the introduction of a financial services ombudsman. In 2005, he lodged an amendment to the States Business Plan seeking law-drafting time for an ombudsman scheme. The Economic Development Committee subsequently agreed to examine the proposal and report to the States.

== 2026 election ==
After 12 years outside the Assembly, Breckon stood as an independent candidate for Senator in the 2026 Jersey general election. His campaign focused principally on reducing government expenditure. He was not elected, finishing 15th among 17 candidates with 4,412 votes.
