= Mike Higgins (Jersey politician) =

Jersey politician

Michael Roderick Higgins

Deputy
- Incumbent
- Assumed office 2011
- Constituency: St Helier No. 3 & 4

Deputy
- In office 8 December 2008 – Present
- Constituency: St Helier No. 3

Mike Higgins is a Jersey politician who was first sworn in as a Deputy on 8 December 2008. He was re-elected as Deputy in the 2011 elections.

== Background ==
Higgins was educated at the University of London where he received an economics degree.

He was a commissioned officer in the Royal Air Force and Royal Air Force Volunteer Reserve (Training Branch) from 1971 to 1983 and, in 1983, was awarded the Cadet Forces Medal for services to the Air Training Corps.

He has been the organiser of the Jersey International Air Display, a long-running annual event in Jersey, since 1997.
