= Anne Pryke =

Anne Enid Pryke

Deputy
- Incumbent
- Assumed office Nov 2011
- Constituency: Trinity, Jersey

Deputy
- In office 2008–2011
- Constituency: Trinity, Jersey

Deputy
- In office 2005–2008
- Constituency: Trinity, Jersey

Anne Pryke is a former politician on the island of Jersey. She was first elected as a Deputy for the constituency of Trinity in the Jersey general election of 2005. As of 2025, she serves as chairperson of Jersey Cancer Relief.

== Political career ==
Pryke was re-elected in 2008, 2011 and 2014; she stood down in 2018.

Pryke has served in several Departments including Infrastructure, Housing, Education, Environment and Health & Social Services.

== Family ==
Pryke is widowed with two children; she worked as a registered nurse for over 20 years before going into politics.

Pryke’s mother Enid Quenault was the Constable of St Brelade for 24 years; the Enid Quenault Health and Welling Centre in St Brelade is named after her. Enid was also a Methodist lay preacher for over 60 years.

Pryke’s grandfather was Deputy of St. Ouen. Her uncle was Constable of St. Ouen.
