= Andrew Green (Jersey politician) =

Jersey politician

Andrew Kenneth Francis Green

Deputy
- In office Dec 2011 – Oct 2014
- Constituency: St. Helier District No. 3, Jersey.

Deputy
- In office Dec 2008 – 2011

Personal details
- Born: Jersey

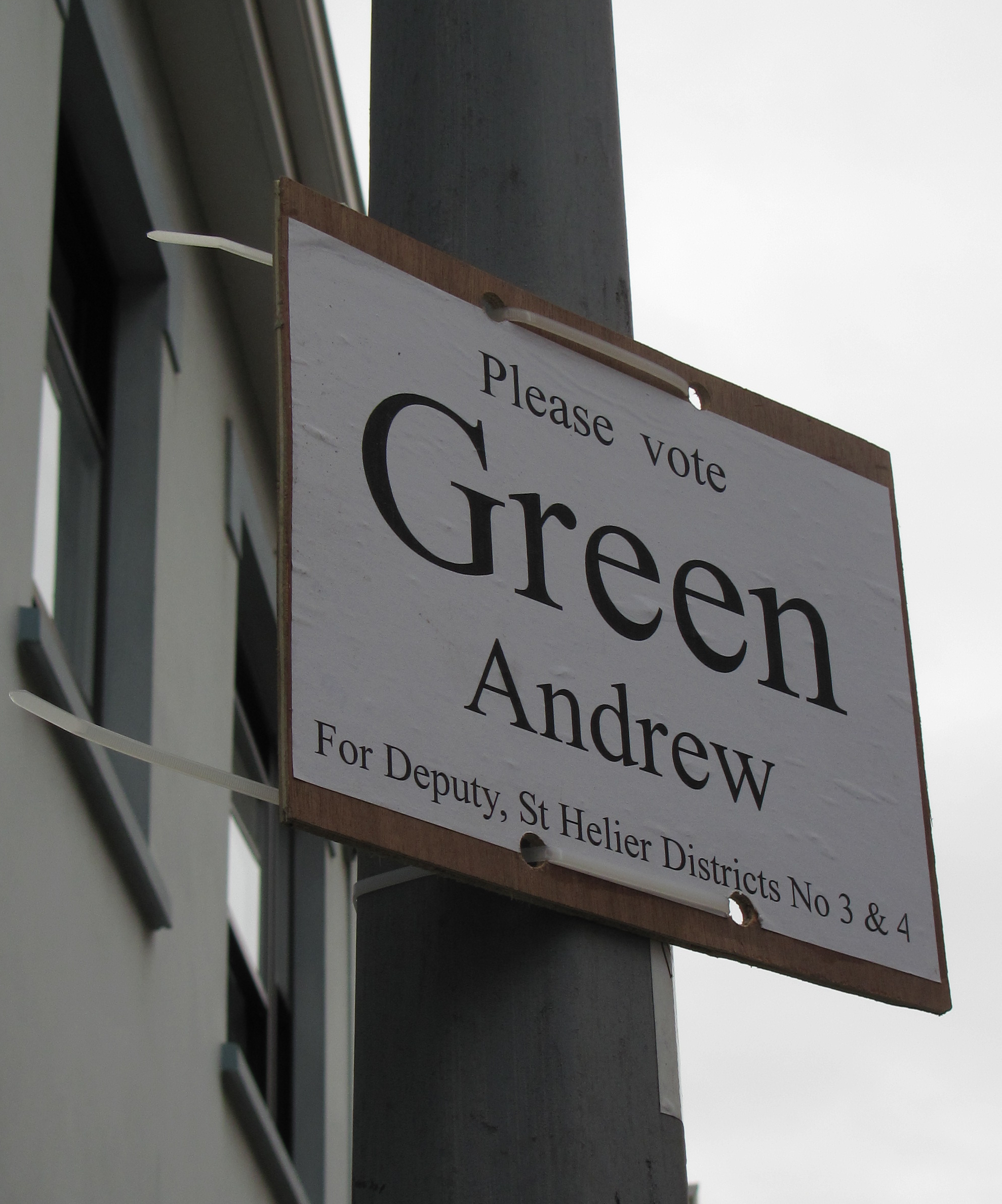
Election poster in 2011 election campaign

Deputy Andrew Green, MBE is a Jersey politician, and a member of the States of Jersey.

== Political career ==
In 2011, Green was elected as Housing Minister, beating Deputy Geoff Southern by 36 votes to 15. In 2014, Green was nominated and elected as Health Minister. He stood down from the States in the General Election of May 2018.

== Voluntary work ==
Green is an unpaid chairman of the charity organisation Headway UK, the Scott Gibaut Homes Trust, and serves on the executive committee of the Jersey Scout Association.
