= Sean Power (Jersey) =

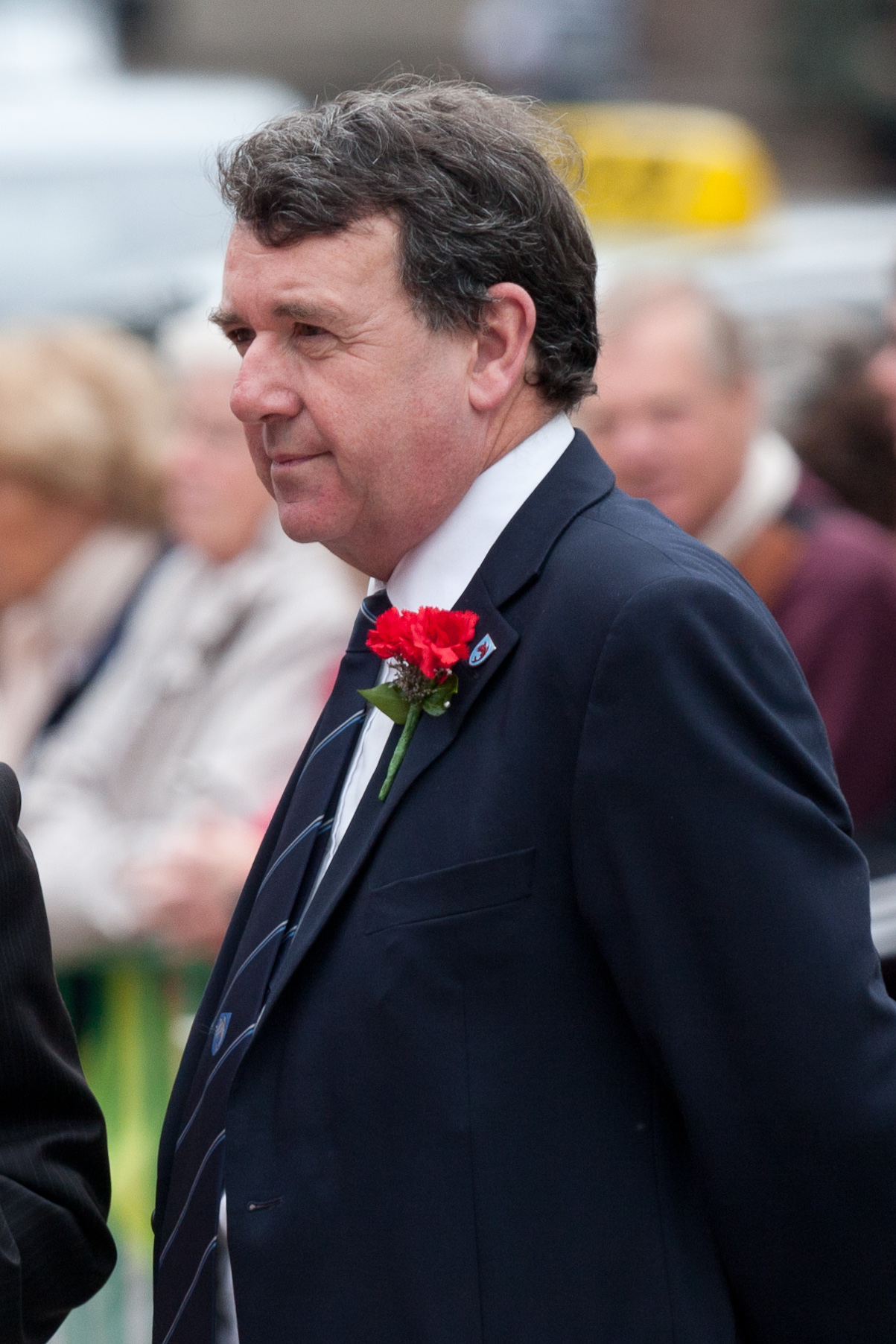
- Sean Power in 2012.

Deputy
- In office 2011 – November 2014
- Constituency: St Brélade No. 2 District
- Majority: 1,491 (60%)

Deputy
- In office 2008 – February 2011 (resigned)
- Majority: 1,068 (29.12%)

Personal details
- Born: 1955 (age 70–71) Limerick, Ireland
- Party: Independent

Sean Seamus Patrick Dooley-Power" (born 1955) was a Deputy in the States of Jersey from 2005 to 2014, and was Housing Minister from 2010 to 2011. He was Deputy for District No. 2 in the parish of St Brélade, before seeking and failing to get elected to the senate in 2014.

== Biography ==
Power was elected as a Member of the States of Jersey in November 2005, and was re-elected in 2008. He was born in 1955 in Limerick, Ireland.

He was elected Housing Minister in June 2010 but resigned in February 2011 after admitting breaching data protection laws.

Power was a candidate for senator in the 2014 election, but failed to get elected.
