= Carolyn Labey =

Jersey politician

Carolyn Fiona Labey
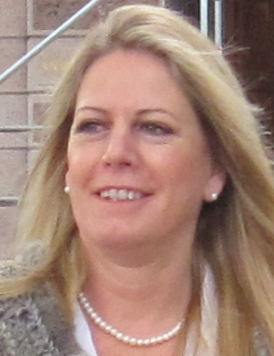
- Labey in 2011

Deputy
- Incumbent
- Assumed office 2011
- Constituency: Grouville
- Majority: 1,075 (56%)

Deputy
- In office 2008–2011
- Constituency: Grouville
- Majority: Unopposed

Deputy
- In office 2005–2008
- Constituency: Grouville
- Majority: Unopposed

Carolyn Fiona Labey is a Jersey politician who was first sworn in as a Deputy for Grouville on 12 December 2002. She was re-elected as Deputy in 2005, 2008 and 2011.

She is Assistant Minister for Economic Development and Assistant Minister for Planning and Environment.

== Early and personal life ==
She was born into a farming family. Her father died when she was 11. She was educated in Jersey and in Paris, France.

Labey owns three fields in Jersey: fields G403C, G403D and G432A.

== Political career ==
Labey was first elected as a Deputy in the parish of Grouville, in the Jersey general election of 2002 with 774 votes. She stood against one other candidate, Patricia Anne Picot, who achieved 397 votes.

She was previously Minister for International Development and Chair of the Jersey Overseas Aid Commission and of the Executive Committee of the Jersey Branch of the Commonwealth Parliamentary Association. During her time as Minister for International Development, she worked on a project linking Jersey and Rwanda. The project raised Jersey cows in Rwanda to produce milk and facilitated the Girinka programme. For the 2022 Jersey general election, the post of senator was discontinued and voting boundaries changed Grouville into a parish. This changed her from being the sole Deputy of Grouville to three representatives split between areas, with the East District covering Grouville and St. Martin.

She supported Ukraine during the Russian invasion of Ukraine, saying Ukrainian people had demonstrated resilience and said Jersey would support the people of Ukraine. She also visited the east of Poland afterwards and met with refugees in the area.
