= Healthcare in Jersey =

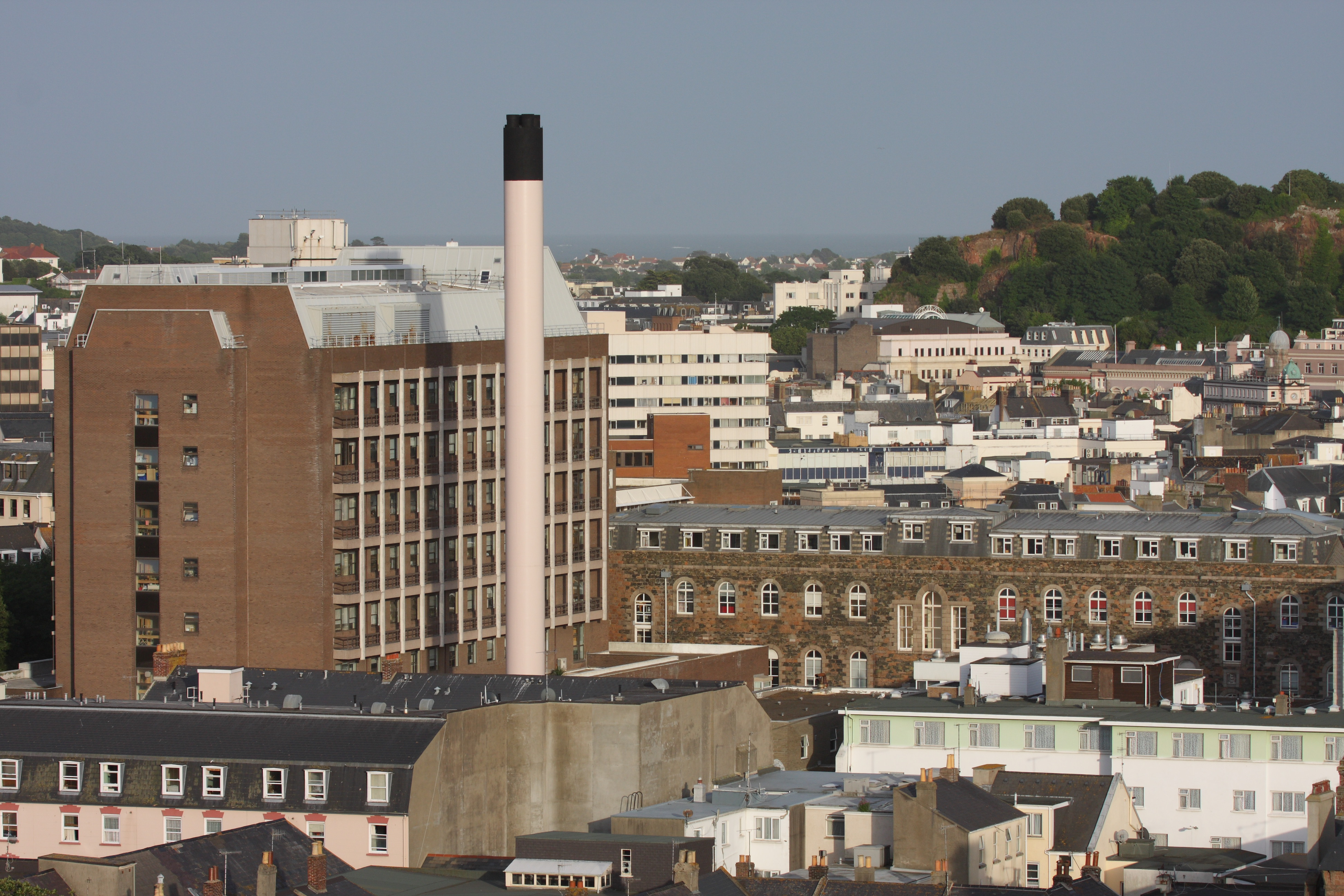
The current General Hospital in St Helier.

Healthcare in Jersey is provided by a range of publicly and privately owned providers. Health matters are overseen by the Department of Health and Community Services in the Government of Jersey. The current Health Minister is Deputy Richard Renouf.

Care at Jersey General Hospital is provided free at the point of use to most ordinary residents of Jersey and emergency care is provided to anyone. However, other services such as GP consultations are privately owned and a fee applies to use them.

There is a Reciprocal Health Agreement with the United Kingdom, agreed in 2011. It does not cover pre-existing or non-urgent conditions.

== History ==
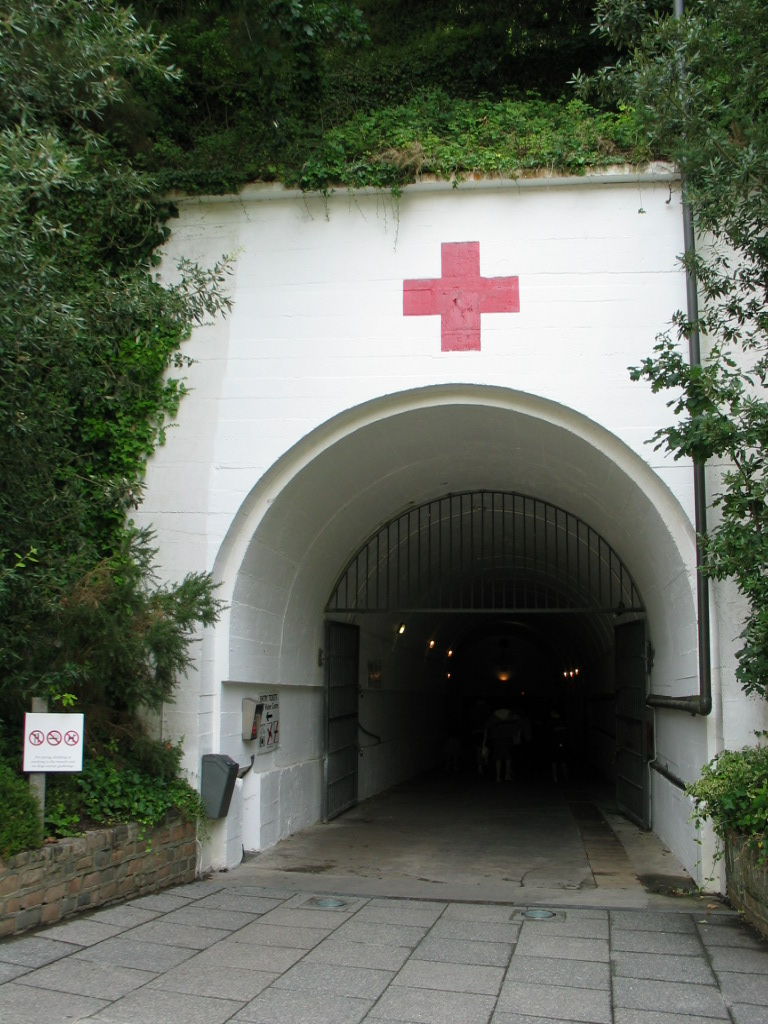
During the Occupation, the Nazis constructed a number of Underground tunnels to house a Hospital.

There were two hospitals on Jersey dating from the 19th century: the General Hospital and St Saviour's Hospital. An early 20th century cottage hospital, with buildings dating to the 1920s, was called the Jersey Dispensary and Infirmary and later the Jersey Maternity Hospital. In the former children's ward two tile pictures depicting Christ receiving children and the Elf king and fairies decorated the walls. The tiles made by Carter & Co. were designed by artist James Radley Young and signed by him 'J.R.Y. 1925'. The hospital buildings are now the Le Bas Centre which continues as a healthcare facility.

== Healthcare system ==
Jersey operates a system of health cards. Anyone resident in the island for more than six months is eligible for a health card. Card holders are eligible for subsidised GP appointments and free prescriptions.

Emergency care is available in the Emergency Department of Jersey General Hospital for free for anyone who needs it.

Non-emergency care at the hospital is only available free to eligible persons. Pregnant women who are eligible can also get free maternity care and any baby born in Jersey, regardless of whether the parents are eligible, can get free postnatal care too. The following types of people — and their spouse, civil partner and dependent children — are eligible:

- Jersey residents with a health card who are in employment, who receive a pension or who have lived in the island for 12 months
- Licensed-status residents
- Permanently Entitled-status residents employed in Jersey
- Permanently Entitled-status residents who have paid tax and social security for 30 years and are in receipt of a pension.

Long-term care is provided for a charge under the Long-Term Care (Health and Community Services Charges) (Jersey) Law 2012, unless they are receiving care for specified mental health reasons. Adults can apply for financial assistance from the Customer and Local Services Department under the Long-Term Care Scheme. Minors who are ordinarily resident can get this care free of charge.

General Practitioners and Dentists are private organisations, so they charge fees for consultations.

Bandages and dressings are not provided. Patients have to provide their own. Family Nursing and Home Care, a local charity which administers free at-home care, cannot cover the cost of dressings.

=== Emergency care ===
See States of Jersey Ambulance Service

== Proposed reform ==
The Jersey Care Model (JCM) is the conceptual framework for organising the health system in Jersey. The model is based around a 'three-ring' model: Person-centred Care, Primary and Community Services and Specialist Services.

Currently, the Government argues, too much treatment is focused on the hospital. For example, the Emergency Department receives patient visits that are not emergency visits. However, under its reform programme, there will be better self-care and preventative care. The following changes are proposed –

- more preventative care
- community outpatient appointments
- long-term condition treatment through GP practices
- boost Island-wide care services through community and voluntary sector
- establish an Urgent Treatment Centre to take non-emergency care away from the Emergency Department
- more day surgery
- do more cancer treatment on-island

== New hospital debate ==
There has been much debate about the construction of a new hospital in Jersey. A States Assembly Proposition (P.82/2012) set out the need for a new hospital in 2012. This has been re-affirmed by the Jersey Care Model published in 2019.

On 13 February 2019, the States Assembly adopted a proposition (P.5/2019) that rescinded the approval of Gloucester Street (the current hospital site) as the site for the Future Hospital. The proposition also rejected the idea that the new hospital should be built at People's Park, Lower Park, Victoria Park, Westmount Gardens or the Parade Gardens. The States voted 39 pour and 7 contre the decision. The pour voters included Health Minister Deputy Richard Renouf who had previously supported the site, claiming the Gloucester St location had been "straight-jacketed" by the Island Plan. The Chief Minister said it would be "madness" to vote for the Gloucester St site again. The proposition did not rule out the Gloucester Street site, but called for the selection process to be restarted. As a result, a 'significant portion' of the £41 million already spent on the project had to be written off, including the purchasing of a number of buildings on Kensington Place.

In July 2020, the Our Hospital Team published the site shortlist for the new hospital, including five sites: St Andrew's Park; People's Park; Overdale; Five Oaks; and Millbrook Playing Fields. 82 sites had originally been considered by the report team. Notably, St Saviour's Hospital and Warwick Farm were rejected due to being at an "unsustainable" location.

On 17 November 2020, it was approved by the States Assembly that the new hospital would be constructed at Overdale in St Helier. It is expected to cost at least £550 million, but could cost up to £800 million.

On 31 January 2021, Advocate Olaf Blakeley lodged a requête, an ancient legal device under Jersey law, on behalf of several home owners opposed to the site selection of the hospital. The legal device launches a vote at a St Helier parish assembly which means the purchase of parish land could be blocked until more information is provided.

On 1 February 2021, the States Assembly approved Westmount Road as the new access route for the hospital. The States voted 34 pour and 11 contre the decision. A number of protestors tied ribbons to trees that the protestors claimed would be destroyed by the project. The Government denied that any of them will be affected. Senator Lyndon Farnham, who is the minister responsible for the project, clarified the cost of the proposed road would be £15.1 million.

On 3 February 2022, the Our Hospital plans to demolish the existing buildings at Overdale were rejected, though this is not expected to have an impact on the delivery of the new hospital. Furthermore, on 2 March 2022, the Planning Department objected to the proposed development because of the quality of design, the height of the building and the impact on the green backdrop zone. On 16 March 2022, the Government accepted that if the hospital planning application is not approved, then a dual-site option could be used instead.

In May 2022 the Minister of the Environment gave planning permission for the new hospital which will be built by a joint venture partnership between ROK and FCC Construcción known as ROK FCC JV at a cost of £804 million.

== See also ==
- Health in Jersey
- List of hospitals in Jersey
