= 2023 in Jersey =

Events in the year 2023 in Jersey.

== Incumbents ==
- Sovereign: Charles III
- Lieutenant governor: Jerry Kyd
- Chief minister: Kristina Moore
- Bailiff: Timothy Le Cocq

== Events ==
- 22 December: The Government announces the COVID-19 vaccination model will be transferred from Public Health to Primary Care in the new year.
