= COVID-19 pandemic in Jersey =

COVID-19 viral pandemic in Jersey

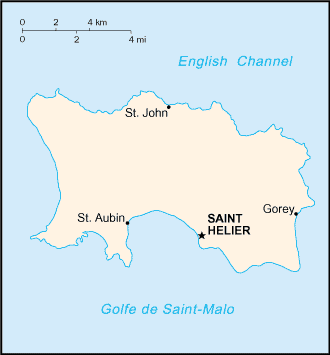
- Map of Jersey
- Disease: COVID-19
- Pathogen: SARS-CoV-2
- Location: Jersey
- First outbreak: Wuhan, China
- Index case: Imported from Italy
- Arrival date: 10 March 2020 (6 years, 5 months, 1 week and 3 days ago)
- Confirmed cases: 12,697
- Active cases: 1,059
- Hospitalized cases: 5
- Recovered: 11,522
- Deaths: 80
- Fatality rate: 0.63%

Government website
- www.gov.je/coronavirus

The COVID-19 pandemic in the Bailiwick of Jersey was part of a global pandemic of coronavirus disease 2019 (COVID-19), a novel infectious disease caused by severe acute respiratory syndrome coronavirus 2 (SARS-CoV-2). The first case in Jersey was confirmed on 10 March 2020 when a person tested positive on the island after returning from Italy.

The Government of Jersey's strategy after lockdown was "suppress, contain and shield." This involved delaying the spread of the virus, avoiding vulnerable people from catching it, helping the island's health service cope with the number of people requiring hospital care and saving as many lives as possible. It acknowledged that many islanders would become infected, and sought to ensure that the best possible medical care was available to them.

== Background ==
A new coronavirus (SARS-CoV-2) was first identified in Wuhan, China in late December 2019 as the cause of a cluster of cases of an acute respiratory disease now referred to as coronavirus disease 2019 (COVID-19). On 11 March, the World Health Organization (WHO) characterised the spread of COVID-19 as a pandemic. As of early 2026, a total of 229 countries and territories have been affected by this virus.

== Timeline ==
=== February - March 2020: Early response ===
On 30 January 2020, the Government of Jersey made its first announcement about the virus, saying that its cross-Government review group met that morning to discuss the situation. The following day the Government issued travel advice for islanders returning from affected areas of China.

On 19 February 2020, a helpline was set up to answer islanders' questions about Coronavirus. It was staffed by personnel from Customer & Local Services, Health and Community Services and Environmental Health. As of 9 April, it was handling on average 550 calls per day.

On 10 March 2020, the first case had reached the island – the infected person had travelled from Italy. The following day a second case was confirmed.

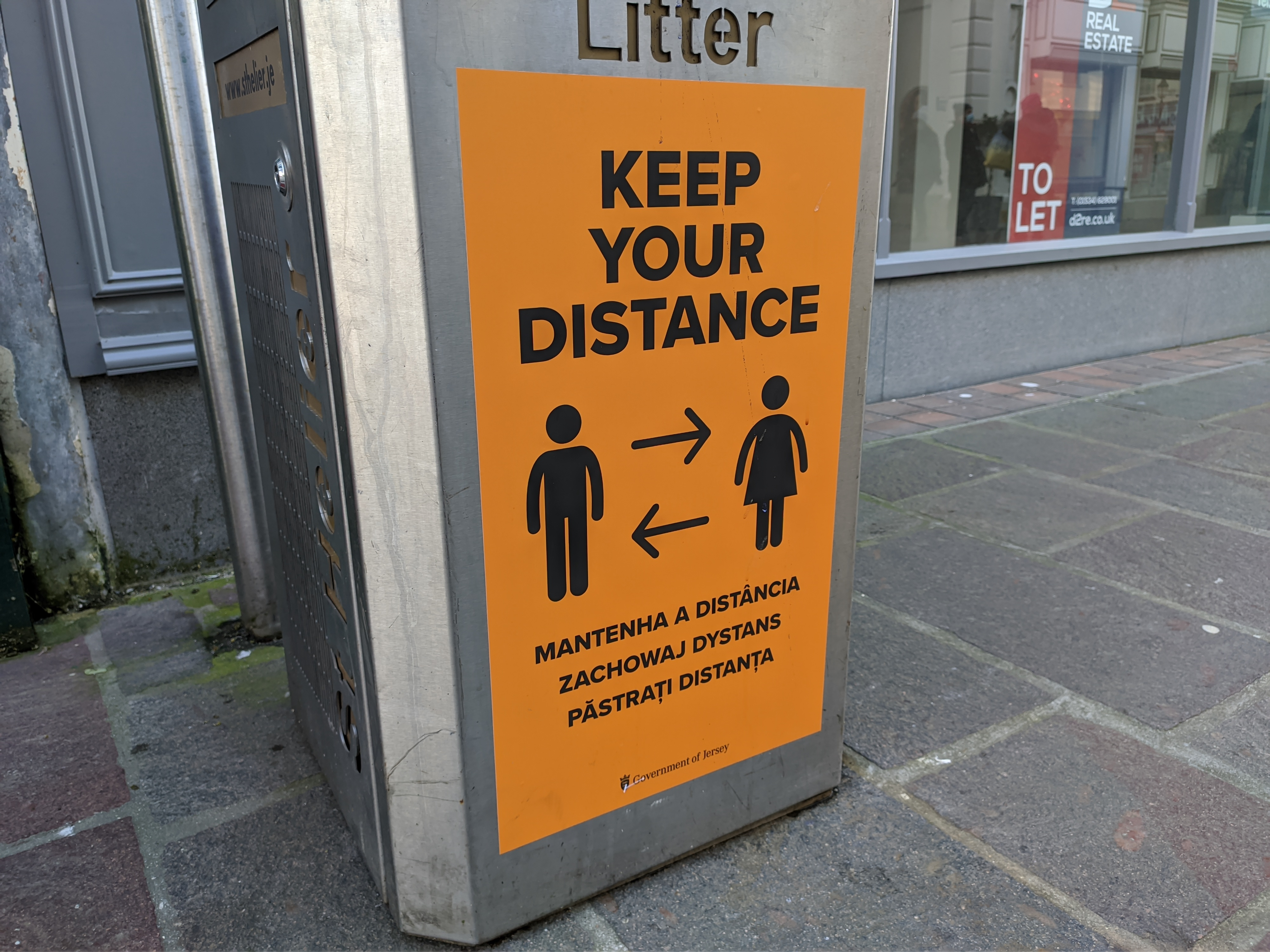
A physical distancing sign in St Helier in 2021

On 12 March 2020, the advice from Senator John Le Fondré, Chief Minister of Jersey was to maintain a semblance of normal life, including continuing to go on holidays off-island, but by 14 March his advice changed, requesting over-65s to start social distancing, and on 20 March he extended this advice to islanders of all ages. Islanders had to avoid non-essential travel.

By 20 March there were 10 confirmed cases in Jersey, two of which were believed to have been contracted within the island rather than by inbound travel. From 20 March, all travellers arriving on the island, other than essential workers, were required to self-isolate for 14 days. From midnight on 26 March, those aged over 65 and people with certain underlying medical conditions were required to self-isolate. On 28 March, islanders were told that if one or more people in a household develop COVID-19 symptoms then all the other members of the household must also self-isolate for 14 days.

On 26 March, the Chief Minister called for young people to heed the social distancing advice for the sake of their family members, and bemoaned the spread of unhelpful rumours by conspiracy theorists over social media.

=== March - April 2020: First wave and lockdown ===
On 30 March, ten patients with COVID-19 were being treated at the hospital. On the evening of 29 March, the Chief Minister announced a lockdown, effective from 8 am the following morning. Islanders were required to stay at home other than for up to 2 hours for specific purposes unless they were employed in an essential function. The reasons to be outside the home included: shopping for basic necessities (as infrequently as possible), daily socially distanced exercise and for any medical needs. Islanders were permitted to travel to any part of the island for fresh air and essential shopping (but travel time was included in the 2 hour limit). People were encouraged to take advantage of large open spaces such as beaches and the countryside.

The States Assembly passed new legislation, including a law to empower the police to remove people from public areas, enforce self-isolation, testing and screening, and detain those who are potentially infected. On 3 April, a Ministerial Decision was signed to keep schools closed until 1 May at least, except for essential workers' children and some vulnerable children.

On 6 April, the number of confirmed cases totalled 169. 19 patients at the hospital were being treated for COVID-19. More granular data began to be reported, and on 15 April, Charlie Parker, Chief Executive of the Government of Jersey, stated that there were 21 patients with COVID-19 being treated at the Jersey General Hospital with eight others 'elsewhere in other hospital settings'.

By 20 April, the Government had started to report the number of patients who had recovered: 118 cases, almost 50% of confirmed cases, were now classified as recovered. In hospital there were 63 patients of which 14 were COVID-19 positive. The Chief Minister had said that antibody testing would be key to the ending of the lockdown with 10,000 kits arriving in Jersey in mid-April, which were being tested, with a further 150,000 on order from a different supplier. On 24 April the initial lockdown was extended, until at least 11 May.

Informal Governmental discussions on a plan for removing restrictions began in mid-April with the intention to enter formal discussions by the end of the month.

=== April - September 2020: Safe exit framework ===
Jersey's exit from lockdown was managed through the Government of Jersey's "Safe exit framework". The framework was composed of four levels:

Safe exit framework
	Level 4	Level 3	Level 2	Level 1
Public health	2 metre distance		1 metre distance	
Movement restriction	Stay at Home order 2–4 hour time limit	Stay home wherever possible 6 hours time limit	No time limit for not being at home	No restrictions
Gatherings	From 2 May: up to 2 people outside	Up to 5 people (a day)	Limited to 20 people	Limit may be increased
Education	Schools closed	Opened on 8 June		
Off-island travel	Essential travel only 14 day isolation on entry		New border policy established	
Businesses	Non-essential work permitted up to 2 people			Work can resume as normal
Businesses	Essential retail only Hospitality closed	Some retail is open Outdoor service	All retail and hospitality is open	
Leisure	Closed		Most can open	

From 11 May there was a gradual relaxation of the "stay at home" rules – the island moved to 'level 3' which allowed people to leave their homes for up to six hours a day and to meet with up to five people per day from other households. Initially, the two metre physical distancing continued to be required outside the home and extremely vulnerable people were required to continue to self isolate. Restaurants and cafes were permitted to serve food in outside seated areas, and large non-essential businesses could operate, all subject to social distancing. A week later, all retail premises were allowed to open, as long as they maintained two-metre physical distancing.

From 29 May the restrictions on time spent outside were lifted, and people were permitted to enter other peoples homes provided no more than five others enter the home. People were required to continue to maintain two-metre physical distancing when outside their household. Fines of up to £1,000 could be imposed for illegal gatherings.

From 8 June, dentists were allowed to carry out routine as well as emergency procedures, nurseries could open and schools could begin accepting some year groups. On 26 June, the social distancing requirement halved to one metre, and from 1 July pubs were allowed to serve alcohol without a meal to seated customers. On 30 June there were no known active cases and over 15,000 tests had been conducted in total. On 7 July the hospital started to allow adults to visit patients, but with number, time and safety conditions applying.

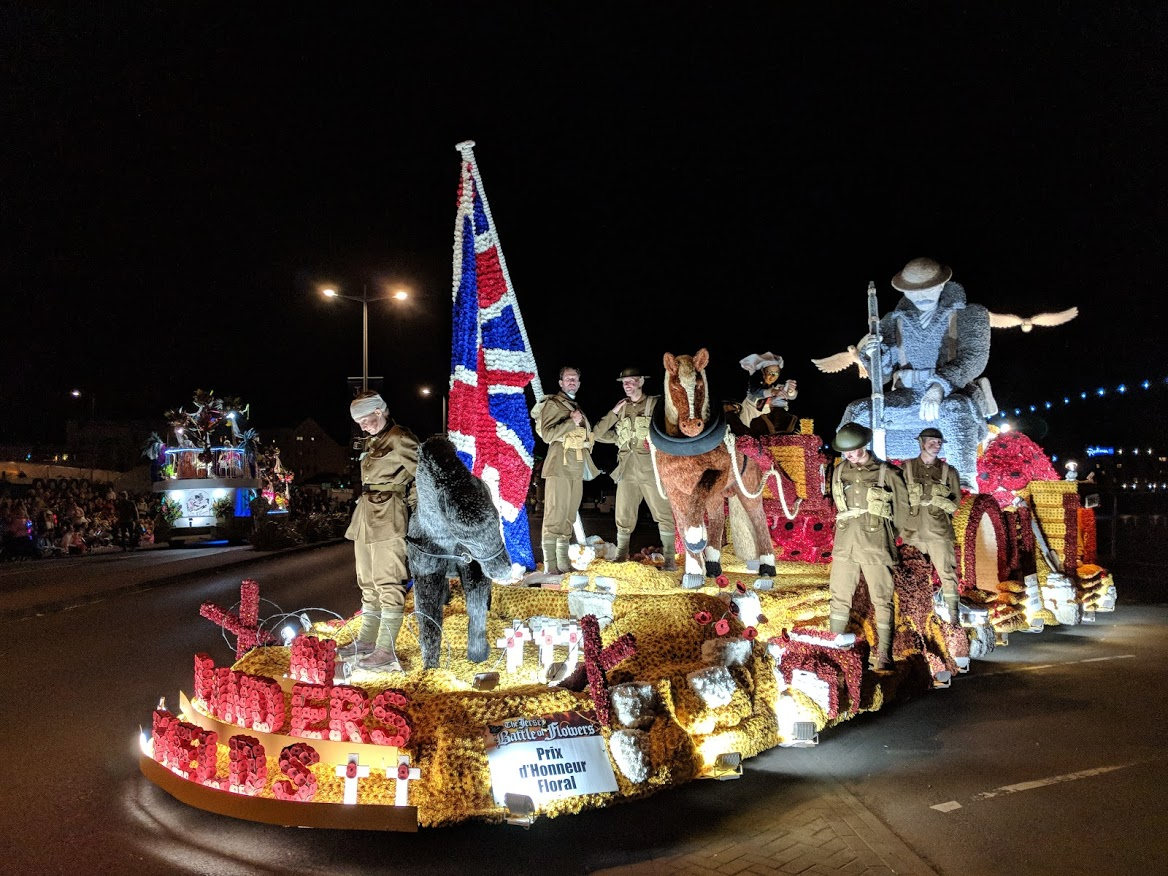
Despite low case numbers, the Battle of Flowers event was not able to go ahead under Level 1 restrictions.

On 8 August Jersey moved to 'level 1', with further relaxation of rules. The aim was to live safely with the virus, promoting SAFER hygiene/at a distance/in smaller groups/outside/when you can be contacted.

At the start of the September term the schools opened to all children, with specific social distancing rules and staggered start times.

From 1 July to 5 October, a breakdown of sources show two were identified whilst seeking healthcare, 83 were inbound travellers, three were admissions screening, four planned workforce screening and 20 from contact tracing.

=== October 2020 - January 2021: Second wave and circuit-break ===
The number of new cases per week began to climb steadily from late September. In November, the Government announced the new "Covid-19 Winter Strategy" in an effort to prepare for winter and avoid a second lockdown. The plan comprised eight main actions:

1. Increasing on-Island testing
2. Continually updating the travel classifications
3. Introducing mask policies for indoor public spaces
4. Adopting shielding programmes to keep people at high risk safe but connected
5. Vaccinating for flu and when possible, for COVID-19
6. Making sure all of Government is prepared, especially in supporting care, health and economic interventions
7. Being ready to escalate if needed, but using the 'least overall harm' principle
8. Communication about sensible behaviour, backed with enforcement

After a spike in new cases, on 30 November, the Chief Minister announced that face masks would be compulsory in shops, supermarkets, banks, on buses and in taxis, in health care settings, at hairdressers and at beauticians and encouraged remote work where possible. Those over 70 years old should avoid indoor contact with people from outside their household.

The restrictions were increased three days later, with all pubs, bars, restaurants, gyms and fitness classes ordered to close within 24 hours, two metre social distancing is also reinstated with an expectation that these restrictions would continue until after New Year.

By mid December, active cases passed 700 with care homes closing to visitors to try and stop new cases occurring as the vaccination of care home residents began. On 17 December, it was announced a care home resident had died from COVID-19.

On 31 December 2020 2,760 cases had been identified of which 556 were active and there had been 44 deaths.

=== January - August 2021: Reconnection ===
On 7 January 2021, the Chief Minister announced the 'process for reconnection', the island's exit strategy from its second period of restrictions. Stage 1 on 11 January saw schools in the island return in full. Other measures would remain in place until at least 25 January, with Ministers announcing more lifting of restrictions on 21 January.

On 24 January 2021, the Health Minister announced the island would move to Stage 2 of the re-connection strategy from 27 January and close-contact businesses from 3 February. It was also announced that islanders would no longer need a referral note for a massage or acupuncture treatment when they reopen. On 26 January, Health Minister Richard Renouf announced the move to Stage 2 would be delayed until 3 February (and close-contact businesses until 10 February) due to a cluster of infections related to staff working in the supply chain of the retail industry. Non-essential retail re-opened from 3 February (nine days later than originally planned) and close-contact businesses were allowed to resume trade from 10 February. On 3 February, it was reported that the town centre was busy, especially King Street. An advisory 'Keep Left' one-way system was implemented on St Helier's high street to help maintain physical distancing.

On 17 February 2021, the Chief Minister announced that further easing of restrictions would take place on 22 February with the island moving to Stage 3 of the re-connection roadmap. Stage 3 saw hospitality venues allowed to reopen as well as the resumption of all outdoor sport and the opening of visitor attractions. 2-metre distancing must be maintained and restaurants and cafés must follow strict guidance on mask wearing and table limits. Alcohol can only be served with a substantial meal, which is either a main course or two starters - and not with light snacks.

Stage 4 would have seen pubs and gyms, indoor swimming being allowed to reopen from 10 March (at the earliest). People will be able to meet others indoors.

On 5 March 2021, Deputy Chief Minister Senator Lyndon Farnham set out the re-connection process to remove all COVID-19 restrictions in Jersey. Each stage will last for at least four weeks, higher than the earlier three weeks.

An announcement on travel restrictions will come the week after.

On-island reconnection plan (Stage 5 - 7) (as originally planned)
Stage	Earliest move to next level	Details
Stage 4	15 March (done)	Indoor gatherings up to 10 people can resume Gyms can reopen
Stage 5	12 April (done)	Remote work recommendation partially ends Outdoor gatherings (up to 20 people) Drinks-only table service.
Stage 6	10 May	Physical distancing 1-metre guidance Remote work guidance lifted All gatherings up to 20 people Weddings/wakes up to 40 people Standing alcohol drinking allowed
Stage 7	14 June	Physical distancing will end. Nightclubs/live music/theatres can reopen Large events can reopen Full review of COVID-19 guidance

On 15 March, Jersey moved to Stage 4 of the reconnection. Indoor sporting events and venues are allowed to re-open. Indoor mixing of up to 10 people was permitted under guidance once again a day earlier for Mothering Sunday.

On 19 March, the Government announced the reconnection strategy for travel. The island will return to regional classifications on the Green/Amber/Red framework from 26 April. From 17 May, all countries will move from all-red to regional classifications except those on the UK "red list" of travel banned countries.

On 30 March, the reconnection pathway was updated to reflect lower case numbers. From 2 April, Good Friday, table-only drinks service will be permitted. From 12 April, the island moved to Stage 5 and the social distancing law and remote work guidance ended. Gathering sizes will be lifted in formal settings, such as in theatres and wedding receptions. Stage 6 will be altered so that standing alcoholic drinking can resume and Stage 7 will go ahead as already planned.

As of 20 June 2021, the move to Stage 7 had been delayed. It was initially delayed by one week to 21 June, however due to a number of inbound cases of the Delta variant, it was again delayed until 5 July. On 13 July 2021, the reconnection stage had still not happened, having been put back to 15 July. However, the 'Freedom Day' was again delayed again indefinitely, due to a large rise in Covid cases.

On 21 July 2021, the government reintroduced the mandatory indoor mask mandate, requiring all islanders to wear masks in shops, restaurants and other indoor settings. On 30 July 2021, the government reduced the mandatory isolation period for people with COVID and those who arrive at the border from 14 days to 10 days.

On 26 August 2021, the island moved to Stage 7 of the reconnection strategy. All legal COVID-19 restrictions were removed, except from a mask mandate on public transport and at Ports of Jersey sites.

=== Living with COVID ===
On 30 November 2021, following similar moves in the UK in response to the Omicron variant, it was announced that all travellers into the island who had been outside the Common Travel Area in the past ten days would be required to take a PCR test, provided free of charge, upon arrival.

On 30 December 2021, the Minister of Health reduced the isolation period to 7 days for positive cases, provided that two negative LFT tests were taken on day 6 and day 7. This followed a similar reduction taken in England.

On 4 January 2022, in response to the Omicron variant, masks were made mandatory again in indoor settings. Work from home guidance was temporarily reintroduced. The requirement to be classed as fully vaccinated was raised to two vaccinations and a booster vaccination, though those fully vaccinated people would not need to do a test if they arrived in Jersey from outside the Common Travel Area.

== Deaths ==
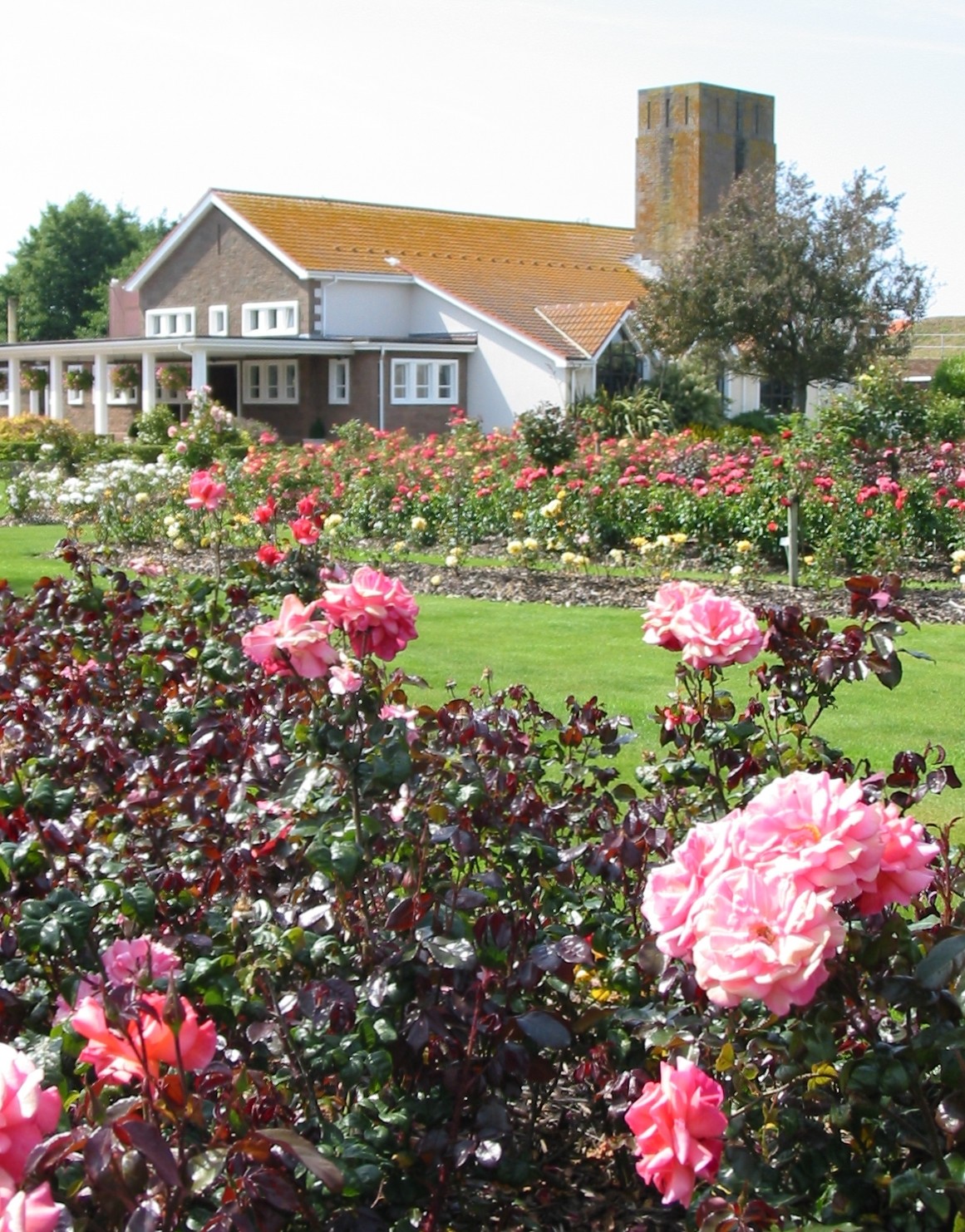
Jersey's crematorium

The first death from COVID-19 was on 25 March. The person was aged in their 80s, had long-term health conditions and had been receiving palliative care before contracting COVID-19. On 29 March a second person died. They were in their 70s and had long-term health conditions before contracting the virus. On 4 April, a third death was announced – a patient in their late 60s who had underlying health conditions.

On 14 April the number of people that have died either under the care of Health & Community Services or in the community where the death certificate mentions COVID-19 increased to six.

On 27 April the Chief Minister revealed that nine of those that had died had done so at the General Hospital, two at St Saviour's Hospital (a facility where mental illness is treated), seven in care homes and the other in their own home. Most were aged in their 70s, 80s or 90s.

By 12 May deaths totalled 26, with 13 in hospital and 13 in the community of which 12 were in care homes. Three were between 50 and 70 years of age and seven were over 90. 38% female, 62% male. On 20 May, the active cases had reduced to 21, of which two were in hospital. Deaths had increased to 29.

During the period 1 January to 7 June 2020 the number of registered deaths from all causes was 303, which was lower than in the same period in the years 2018 (389) and 2019 (344). This trend continued into October.

== Overview of response ==
=== Strategy ===
Jersey is a self-governing Crown Dependency of the UK. Jersey's response has been entirely independent of that of the UK, however the island's response to the virus has at times been similar to that of the UK.

Jersey's response is led by the Government of Jersey and overseen by the Chief Minister Senator John Le Fondré, Health Minister Deputy Richard Renouf and Deputy Chief Medical Officer of Health Dr Ivan Muscat. Jersey's COVID-19 strategy has been to "delay, contain and shield" the virus. The present strategy is the "Covid-19 Winter Strategy".

The strategy has been criticised by some with comparisons drawn to neighbouring Guernsey's response. Guernsey pursued an elimination strategy and has had less restrictions than Jersey since the summer, however has had much tighter border restrictions. Because of this, Guernsey has had fewer cases and deaths and has not experienced the large second wave Jersey did. The head of Jersey Business said it was not useful to draw comparisons between the islands since they have different economies.

=== Testing ===
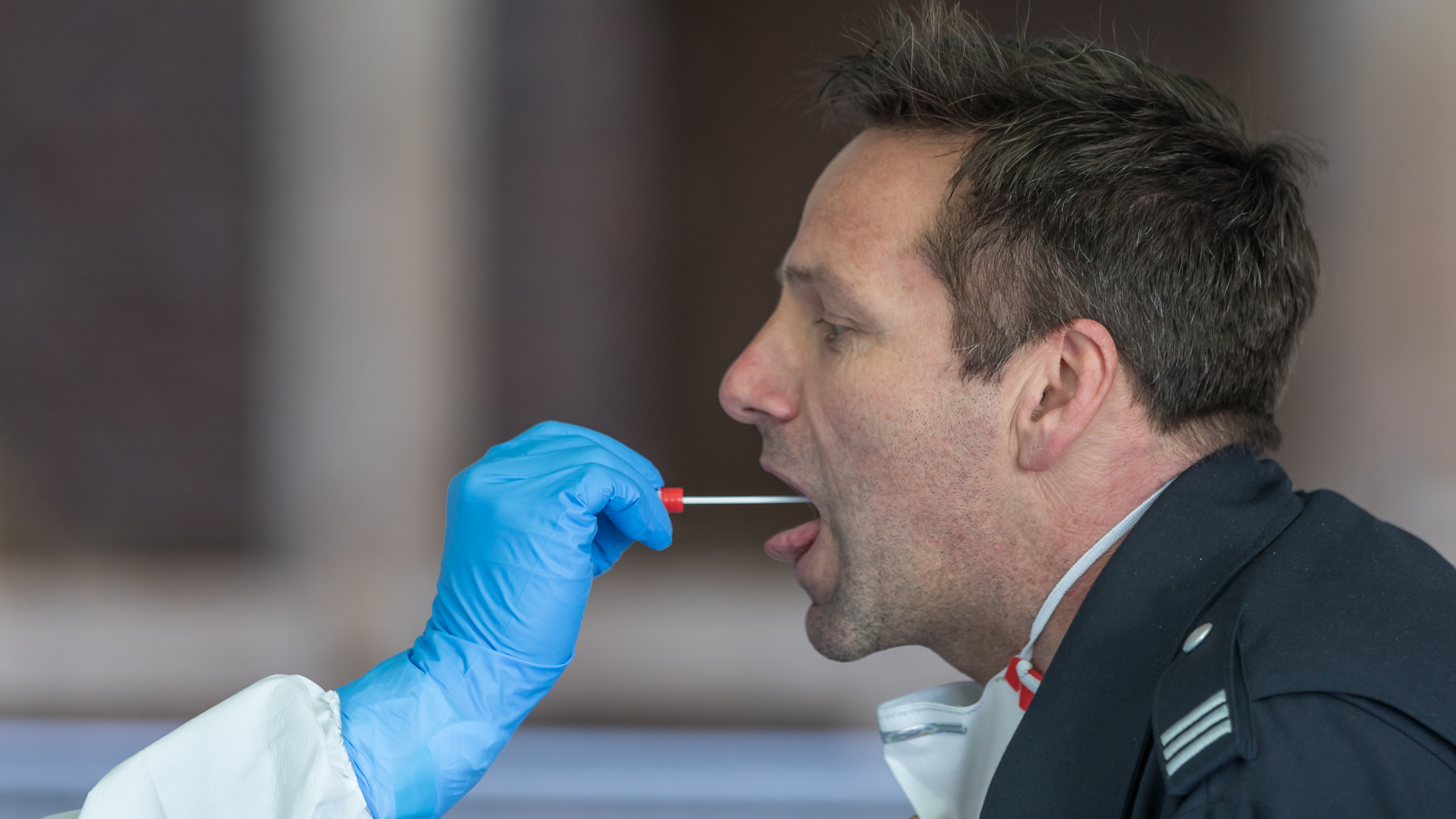
Swab testing has been used in Jersey to detect cases on-island and from inbound travel.

Initially tests were sent to Colindale in London for processing, with results taking between 48 hours and five days. In March arrangements were being made to establish a test facility on island, and this was expected to be ready as soon as the end of April 2020. Five thousand test kits were ordered.

On 15 March, a testing centre was opened at Five Oaks.

On 2 April, the government announced that the 5,000 COVID-19 Polymerase chain reaction (PCR) tests that it had ordered were being supplied by Cepheid Inc in California and two other companies. 150,000 serology tests have been ordered from a UK supplier. The serology tests would identify antibodies in people who have developed immunity. They were due to arrive in batches with the first batch expected in April. They intended to test all households in order to enable a phased 'managed exit from the stay home restrictions'. Islanders will be asked to attend mobile testing centres around the island.

On-island testing commenced on 8 April, with the intention that laboratory staff would work 24 hours a day, seven days a week to be able to process same-day results. The pathology manager said "Around 20 biomedical scientists and laboratory support staff have been trained to perform [the tests]." Initially the lab was processing 75 tests a day, increasing to 120 a day from 15 April.

In mid-April, 50,000 Healgen antibody detection kits were donated by Gary Hopkinson and Alex Shnaider to Jersey residents.

By 10 May, the results of the antibody testing indicated that only a small proportion of the population had been infected to date. Preliminary indications were of 3.1% ±1.3% infection (95% confidence) with a sample of 855 people.

On 26 May, the Government began offering free 15 minute blood tests to anyone who had worked away from home, to test for antibodies.

The results of a second States of Jersey antibody testing report indicated around 4.2% of the population had contracted COVID-19 based on over 1,000 random tests conducted, with 62% of positive results stating they had not noticed any symptoms. A report by Orchid Care Services, based on 1,146 tests indicated 11% of those taking the test had COVID-19 anti-bodies in their blood.

The testing equipment on the island was only being used when a result is needed urgently, such as when a patient is being admitted to hospital or discharged to a care home. Less urgent tests were sent via a chartered aircraft to a private lab at the University of Warwick Science Park in Coventry, with results normally received within 24 hours. This was because of a worldwide shortage of filters used in the testing machine.

In August, the hospital announced it would set up a self-contained lab capable of testing 1,000 to 1,500 people per day. This would be important as part of preparation for a second wave. The new equipment, which cost around £3 million, arrived in the island on 13 August to become operational in September. Aiming to cut the wait time to receive test results to around 12 hours, the testing laboratory installed near the airport began processing tests in mid-September. It has a maximum capacity of 2,000 tests per day.

December saw tests undertaken pass 200,000. By 27 August 2021, a total of 660,633 tests had been conducted since 2021, of which 650,660 were negative.

==== Commercial testing ====
A healthcare provider in Jersey, Orchid Care Services, announced it would provide onsite COVID-19 IgG/ IgM Rapid Tests supplied by Californian company CTK Biotech, which have been approved by the Australian Government and had been used to test their own employees. The Government advised extreme caution in their use and would be unlikely to accept data obtained from their use. The facility opened on Friday 15 May and was shut down on 30 June after carrying out over 1,400 tests. The company said it would continue to provide a testing service to businesses who want to screen their staff.

A law to regulate private testing facilities came into force on 15 July 2020.

In August a doctor's surgery began offering a COVID-19 swabbing facility for Islanders who require proof of a test result in order to fulfil travel plans.

=== Contact tracing ===
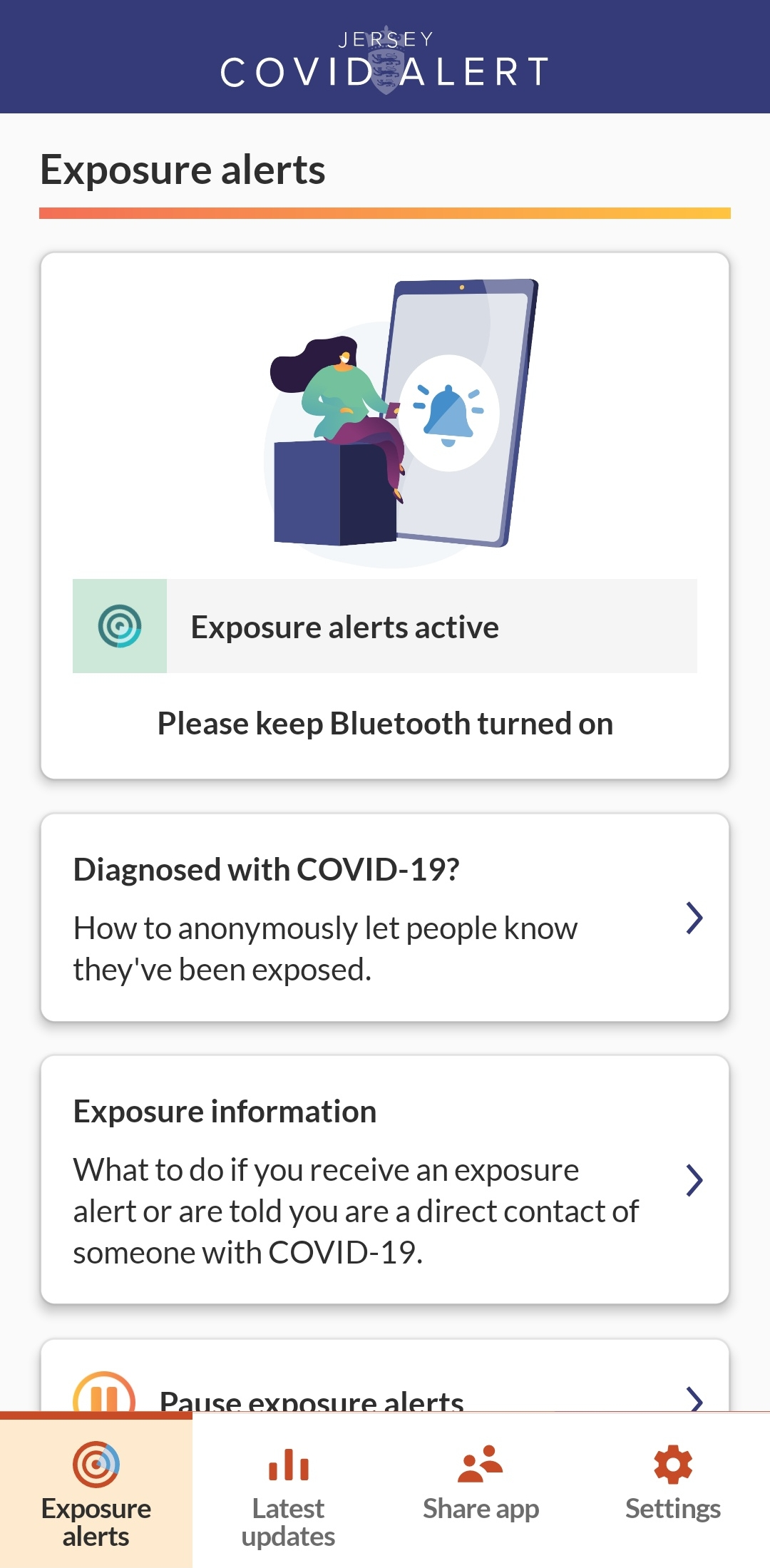
Jersey Covid Alert app

The government introduced a contact tracing strategy, intended to identify people who have been in recent contact with someone who has tested positive for COVID. The contact testing team helps the individual to identify people they have been within two metres of for more than 15 minutes, or had direct physical contact with without wearing protective equipment.

Businesses such as hair salons, restaurants and bars are required to collect contact information from customers in order to enable contact tracing if a customer is later tested positive.

On 14 October a smartphone contract tracing app called 'Jersey Covid Alert' was launched. It was developed by NearForm at a cost of £240,000 and was based on the same system used in Ireland, Scotland, New York and New Jersey. It is based on the Exposure Notification technology developed by Apple and Google. The app does not track the user's location and is decentralised, with no personal information held other than on the user's smartphone. Three weeks after launch the app had been downloaded over 38,000 times.

At a press conference on 30 November, the Chief Minister announced that the contact tracing team was being expanded from 55 staff to at least 89.

=== Economic response ===
==== Financial support ====
On 12 March 2020, the Minister for Economic Development announced deferred social security and GST payments, and deferred rent for businesses where the government was the landlord. On 20 March, he announced that government would pay a subsidy of up to £200 a week to workers in the hospitality, retail, wholesale and agriculture and fisheries industries until the end of April. He announced an enhanced phase 2 package of support on 26 March, using the island's strategic reserve – the so-called 'rainy day fund' – to pay up to 80% of the wages of affected staff in certain industries, capped at £1,600 a month.

The payroll co-funding system was extended on 1 June to run to the end of August 2020. Phase 1 covered March and cost around £2m, Phase 2 around £20m.

In October 2020, the Council of Ministers decided to introduce a new financial support package, however this was overturned by the Treasury Department as it was not "good use of public money". Senator Lyndon Farnham applied a ministerial order to take responsibility for fund allocation.

The support was announced on 5 January 2021, the conditions for the new measures were announced for GST-registered businesses who had a minimum turnover of £300,000 and have suffered detriment to at least 50% of that.

On 21 January 2021, Economy Minister Senator Lyndon Farnham announced a number of support measures for businesses during the circuit breaker. £12 million extra on improved payroll subsidies, £9.5 million for fixed costs support for all (not just hotels) and GST & Social Security deferral for Quarter 1 (January to April).

==== Economic recovery ====
On 10 July it was announced a number of measures including direct payments to low income households, every adult and child in Jersey would be given £100 in vouchers to spend locally and to help employment a reductions in social security contributions and a fiscal spending programme to help local businesses.

The 2020 Government Plan announced a number of efficiencies measures totalling to £120 million. A further £386 million of debt may be taken out and £235 million will be diverted from the Social Security Fund.

=== Health ===
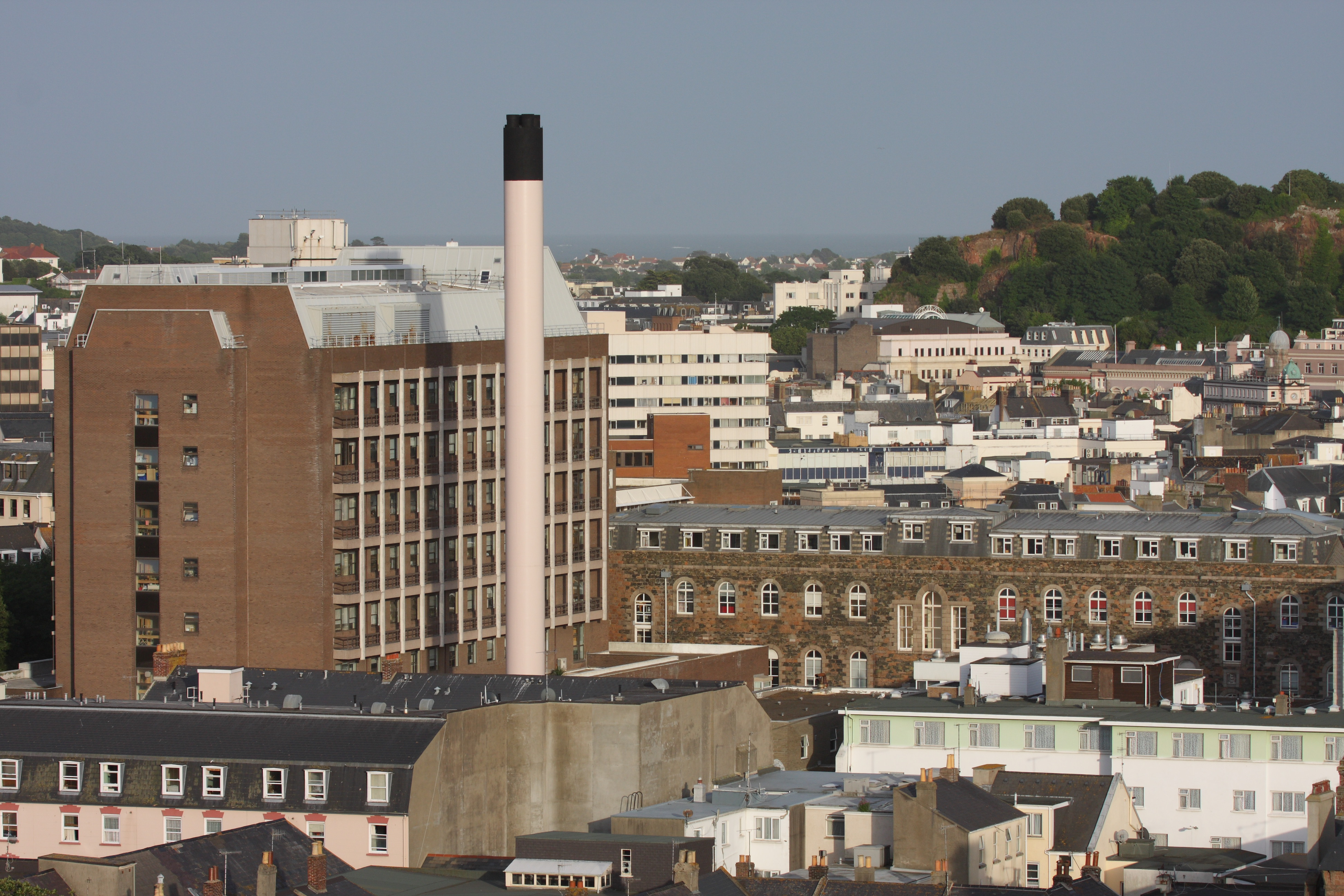
Jersey's General Hospital

Jersey has its own health service, separate to the NHS. Its Health & Community Services department has developed its own response to the virus, having planned for a possible pandemic since at least 2009.

On 19 March, the Minister for Health and Community Services announced that the General Hospital would be closed to visitors.

On 20 March government announced that non-essential operations and outpatient appointments would be cancelled for a four-week period.

On 30 March the Chief Minister stated that ten patients were being cared for at the General Hospital, and that the island had 27 ventilators. The island does not have its own extracorporeal membrane oxygenation (ECMO) machine – patients needing one would normally be transferred to Southampton General Hospital. People who have worked in the health sector such as dentists and pharmacists were asked to volunteer to support the health service.

On 8 April, 17 residents at an unnamed care home were being treated for the virus.

Military helicopters based at RNAS Culdrose in Cornwall are on standby to transport critically ill patients from Jersey to intensive care facilities at hospitals in the UK if necessary. They could also be used to fly in medicines, equipment and specialist doctors.

The Deputy Medical Officer of Health Dr Ivan Muscat has had a prominent role in leading the health response to the pandemic. He and Medical director Patrick Armstrong were appointed MBEs in the Queen's Birthday Honours in 2020.

==== Nightingale hospital ====
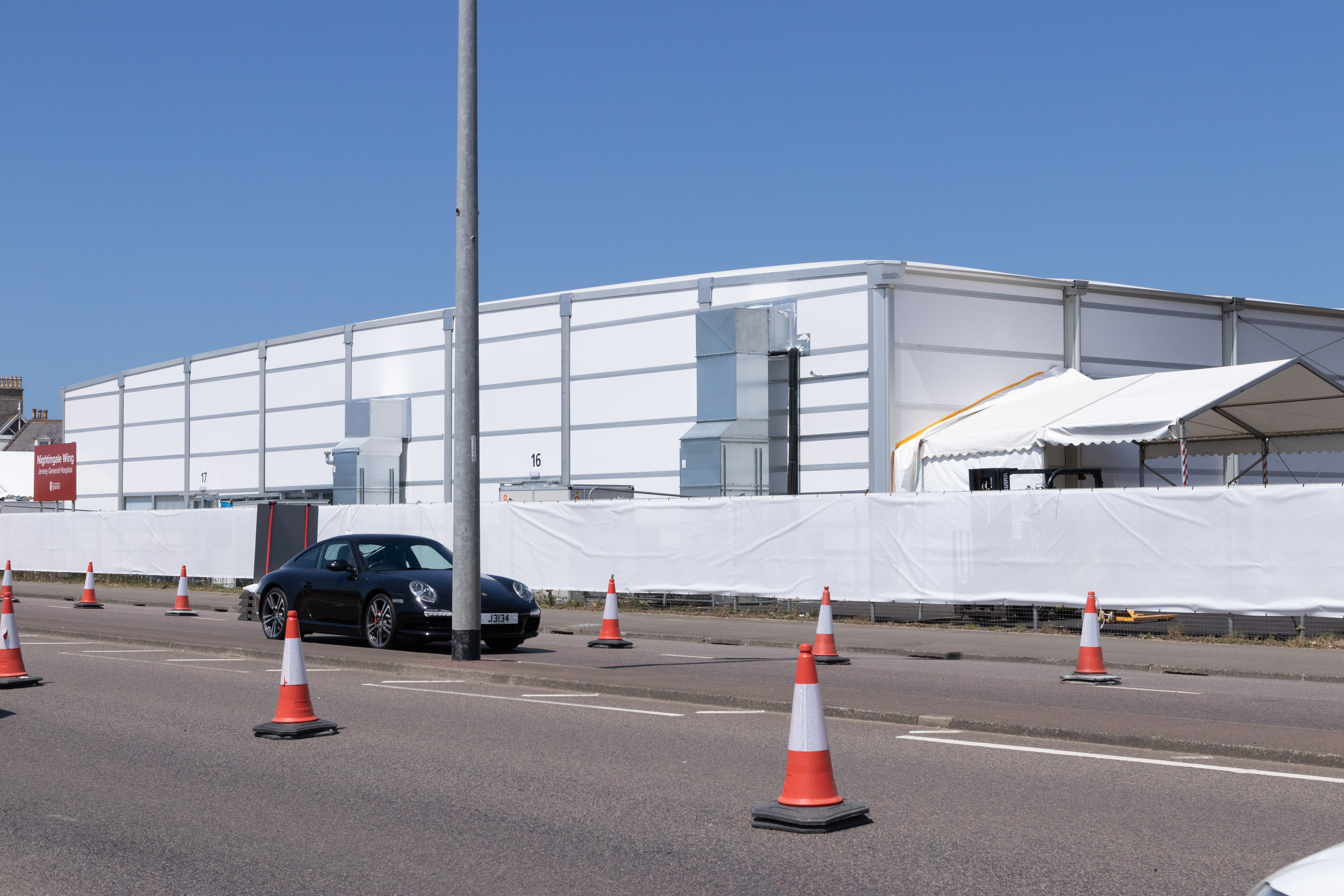
The Nightingale Wing of Jersey General Hospital

On 9 April the Government announced that a field hospital would be built on a playing field at Millbrook. Sometimes described as a 'wing' of Jersey General Hospital, it was located adjacent to St Matthew's Church, 3 kilometres (1.9 miles) from the main site. The so-called Nightingale hospital was expected to cost £14.4m and to take less than a month to build. It would be 150m long and 30m wide, containing six wards of 30 beds each, but could be expanded to contain up to 240 beds. The field belongs to the family of Lord Trent. The contractor building the site, J3 Limited, was a joint venture between Sir Robert McAlpine, Garenne Construction Group and FES Group. It was involved in building Nightingale hospitals in Glasgow and Manchester.

On 4 May the construction was completed and the building passed to the control of the Health and Community Services department. On 11 May the hospital was opened by the Earl and Countess of Wessex via video link. The Nightingale hospital wing remains unused.

On 14 August the Government announced that the facility would remain in place over the winter, with the lease having been extended to 31 March 2021. The total cost remained within the original budget.

==== Health issues ====
In June 2020 the States of Jersey published a report into the health aspects of the lockdown. Amongst the points made was that detentions by the police of people with mental health issues had risen and that five attempts at suicide could be linked directly to the lockdown causing mental health issues. The poorest seem to be hit hardest, widening the gap between the haves and have nots.

In August it was announced that when a vaccine becomes available it will be offered to all for free, and the first to receive it will be the most vulnerable. The cost was estimated at £5m.

=== End of life and funerals ===
In March, restrictions on funerals include a ban on church services and only a maximum of ten mourners who must be immediate family may attend was implemented.

The island has capacity for the storage of 100 bodies across the hospital and funeral homes, but the Government prepared a temporary morgue called 'The Sanctum' in case the capacity was exceeded.

In mid-April, the March ban on visiting dying patients was lifted to permit relatives wearing PPE to visit their loved ones.

On 1 July restrictions were relaxed permitting 80 to attend funerals if the building permitted that number with social distancing.

=== Transport and travel ===
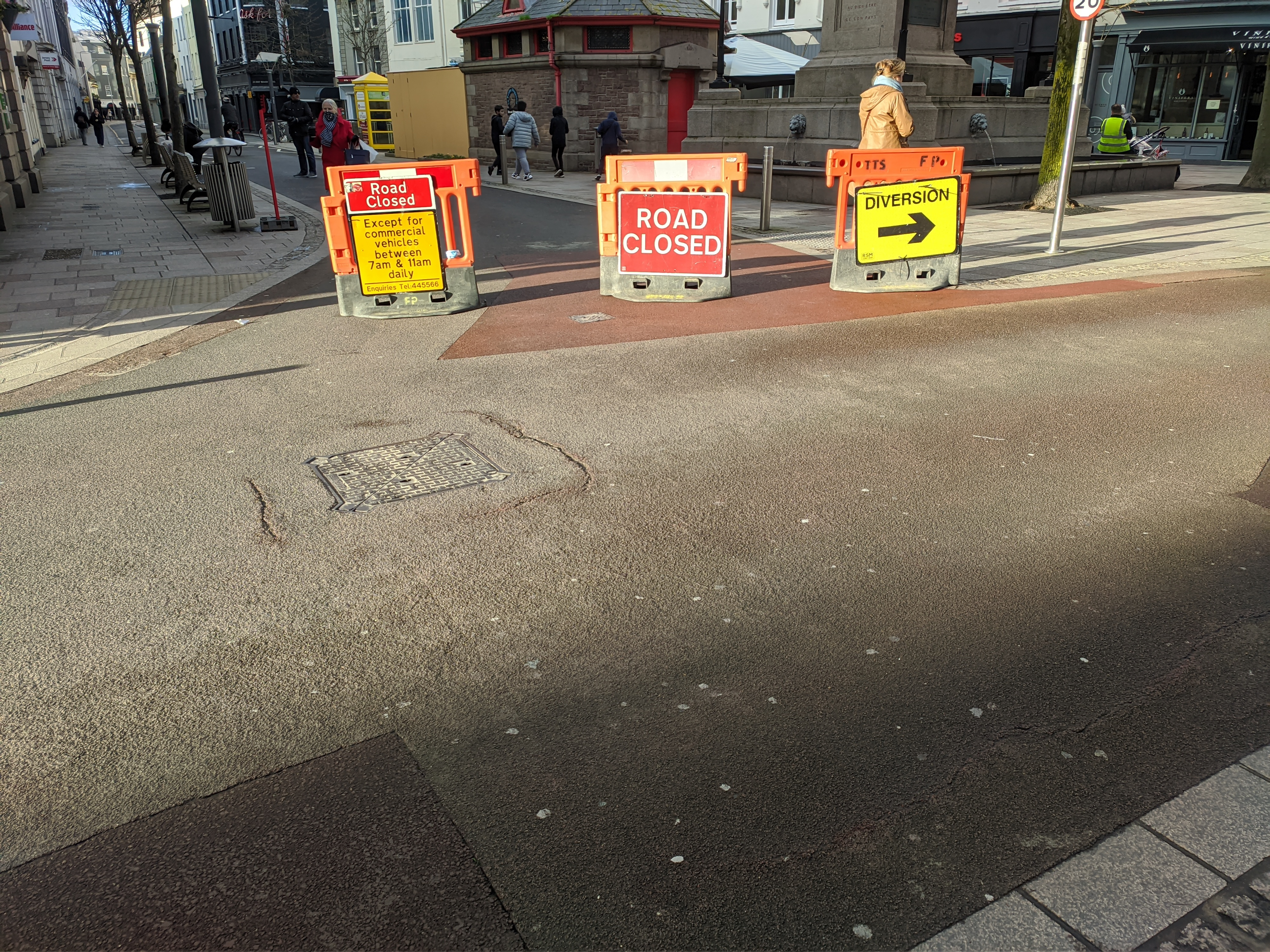
Signs indicating the Broad Street closure

Broad Street in Saint Helier was closed in May 2020 to help physical distancing, similar to many other streets projects in response to the pandemic over the British Islands. The road is located in the town centre near King Street. At the time Infrastructure Minister Deputy Kevin Lewis suggested more projects, but did not give details. No further projects have been introduced. Delivery vehicles can still access the road between 7 am and 11 am and cyclists all day in both directions.

The Chamber of Commerce criticised the move, saying that although the Minister had closed the street "according to the advice from the Medical Officer for Health", neither the Minister for Health nor the Medical Officer had been consulted. They said the closure "makes little sense" and a "long-held political wish of some". They say the road is "largely unused by pedestrians" and that the closure "is affecting retailers". A petition was introduced in opposition to the move, however did not gain enough signatures to achieve a States Assembly response. On 3 February 2021, an advisory 'Keep Left' one-way system was implemented on King Street to help maintain physical distancing.

==== Travel restrictions ====
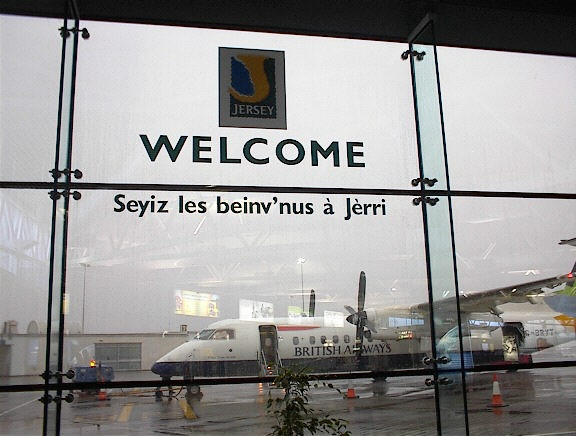
Jersey's testing and tracing regime allowed travel to and from the island to resume from July 2020

On 12 March 2020, the advice from Senator John Le Fondré, Chief Minister of Jersey was to maintain a semblance of normal life, including continuing to go on holidays off-island. But on 14 March, the advice was changed so that only essential travel into and out of the island was recommended.

From 20 March to 1 July 2020, all travellers arriving on the island, other than essential workers, were required to self-isolate for 14 days. All non-essential off-island travel was restricted during the lockdown. Since 1 July 2020, Jersey's borders have been open, but with travel restrictions such as testing and self-isolation in place. Jersey has taken a rather different strategy from Guernsey, favouring keeping shorter self-isolation periods for entering the island.

As part of the Level 3 restrictions in the Government's reopening strategy, passengers arriving in the island since 1 June have been given an option to have a PCR test and if negative were not required to self-isolate for two weeks. If the test is positive they were required to undergo several additional tests with a finger prick blood serology test on the fourth and possibly additional PCR tests on fourth and seventh day after arrival. From 3 July the restriction on non-essential travel was lifted. Islanders and tourists were allowed to travel in and out of the island without permission. Passengers must pre-register on the government website before travelling, including declaring anywhere they have travelled in the past 14 days. The default requirement is to self-isolate for 14 days upon arrival in the island, but travellers can opt-in to the 'Safer Travel Testing Programme' to have a shorter isolation period. Since 8 July, all countries and regions are classified using a "traffic light" system, either green, amber or red. Passengers must be tested on day 0, day 5 and day 10 from their arrival in Jersey. The self-isolation requirements are as follows.

Classification	Self-isolation requirement
Green	Until the negative result of the day 0 test
Amber	Until the negative result of the day 5 test
Red	Until the negative result of the day 10 test

Originally, the testing only took place on day 0 for Green and Red arrivals, and on day 0 and day 5 for Amber arrivals. Those arriving from Red countries were required to self-isolate for 14 days without exception, while those arriving from Green countries had no self-isolation requirement at all.

On 27 August, the categorisation of the UK, Ireland and France moved to a regional level, and the UK to a local authority level. From 13 October all arrivals to the Island are required to self-isolate until they receive their first negative test.

In mid November the testing and isolation regime was changed to its present form, with tests on arrival, day 5 and day 10, with isolation reduced to 10 days for red zone arrivals, first negative test for green zones and after day 5 negative result for amber areas.

On 22 December 2020, the Government placed all UK regions on the "red" list in response to the new UK variant at the time, including those transiting through the UK. On 15 January 2021, all regions and countries were classed as "red", with Guernsey being classed as "amber" due to a growing number of COVID-19 variants being discovered around the world.

As of 21 January 2021, the border testing programme has identified 339 cases of the 3,097 total confirmed cases. There have been 135,599 cases identified through the programme since 1 July.

On 26 April 2021, the island's travel restrictions returned to a traffic-light model as before for destinations in the British Islands. International travel will resume on 17 May. As of 18 March, despite all regions still being classed as red, 18% of regions in the British Isles (including Ireland) would be green, 50% would be amber and 32% would be red. A free travel 'air bridge' is being considered for travel between Jersey and Guernsey. The Safe Travel Guidelines Review Panel of the States have suggested that the criteria should be tightened before restrictions are lifted. This would see the criteria for a place to be categorised as green reduced to 25 from 50 cases per 100,000 people.

Senator Lyndon Farnham, the Economic Development Minister, has suggested that COVID-safety certificates could be introduced to ease travel restrictions, with those fully-vaccinated arriving from amber countries being classed as 'green'.

On 10 May, it was announced a new travel policy would be implemented from 28 May. The regions system in place for the UK was replaced by a system based on the nations of the UK, with each country having a single classification. These changes were applied retrospectively. The traffic light system restarted for all destinations, based on the UK traffic light system. The testing requirements changed as follows:

Classification	Travel rules	Travel rules for those fully vaccinated
Green	Day 0 + 8 test Isolate until result of Day 0 test	Day 0 test No isolation requirement
Amber	Day 0 + 5 + 10 test Isolate until result of Day 5 test	Day 0 test No isolation requirement
Red	Day 0 + 5 + 10 test Isolate until result of Day 10 test	

From 15 June, Amber classifications will no longer be used for the UK. Instead, 'green' and 'red' zones shall be used for UK nations, with 'Emergency Brakes' in place in hotspots suffering from the Delta variant. Initially, Scotland was classed as red and the rest of the UK classed as green, with hotspot areas classed as red. The isolation requirements will change as follows:

Classification	Travel rules	Travel rules for those fully vaccinated
Green	Day 0 + 8 test Isolate until result of Day 0 test FAST TRACK: Those with a negative PCR test up to 72 hours before arrival do not need to isolate on arrival.	Green-light policy Day 0 test No isolation requirement
Amber	Day 0 + 5 + 10 test Isolate until result of Day 5 test	Green-light policy Day 0 test No isolation requirement
Red	Day 0 + 5 + 10 test Isolate until result of Day 10 test	Day 0 + 8 test Isolate until result of Day 0 test

On 17 June 2021, it was announced that from 29 June, all of England would be classified as red due to a rise in cases in that country, caused by the Delta variant, with a number of emergency brakes from 22 June. However, restrictions were loosened for under-19s, who from 22 June will be treated as green regardless of travel history.

=== Vaccinations ===
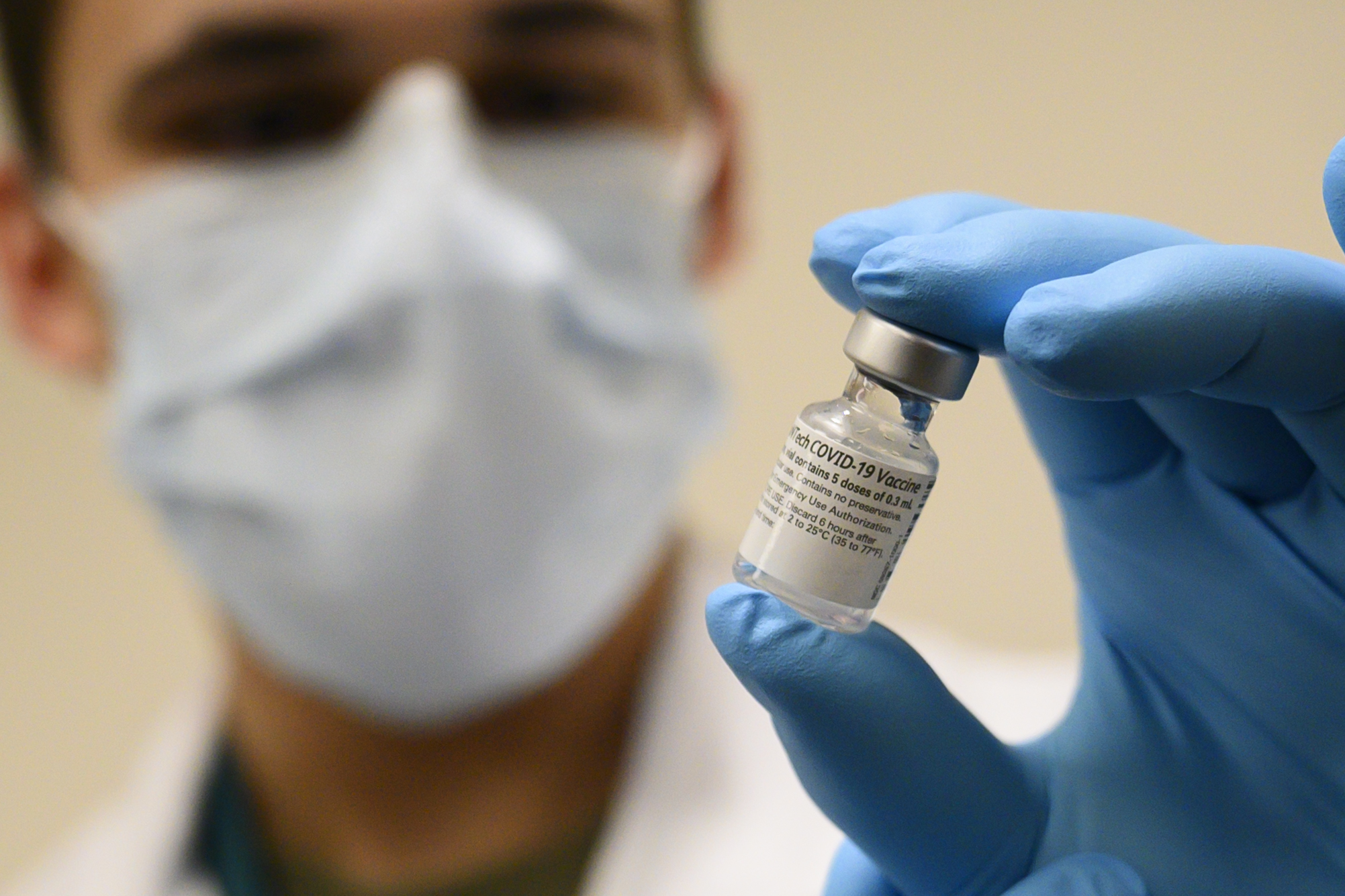
The Pfizer-BioNTech vaccine

The first supply of around 1,000 doses of the Pfizer/BioNTech COVID-19 vaccine arrived on Island on 8 December, with the first vaccination given on 13 December to an 87 year old. The second batch of 1,950 doses arrived on 15 December. On 6 January 2021 the island received 900 doses of the Oxford-AstraZeneca vaccine, which were rolled out starting from 18 January.

=== Other reactions ===
On 19 March, the island's telecommunications operators announced a free increase in broadband speed to 1 Gbit/s for all subscribers.

In January 2021 during the second wave of the virus, the premises of the Royal Jersey Agricultural and Horticultural Society in Trinity were turned into a temporary court.

=== Criticism ===
In the early stages of the pandemic the Government of Jersey was criticised for inadequate communication and for initially not releasing certain statistics citing data protection reasons. Jersey's introduction of on-island testing was slower than neighbouring Guernsey. In common with most other jurisdictions Jersey suffered from shortages in personal protective equipment (PPE). The media also criticised the lack of a published plan for exiting lockdown.

The approach taken by Jersey has been markedly different to Guernsey. Jersey adopted a 'suppress, contain and shield' strategy, re-opening its borders in June with an extensive testing and contact tracing strategy, while Guernsey followed an elimination strategy, requiring most arrivals to self-isolate for seven or fourteen days. Jersey's approach was called into question during Jersey's second wave which saw 1,748 new cases in Jersey during December compared to nine in Guernsey.

Guernsey Deputy Peter Ferbrache called Jersey's government 'a bunch of bumbling idiots' and said that his island was a 'much, much, much better run bailiwick' and Jersey businesses might regret setting up the island. He was later in 2020 elected as Guernsey's Chief Minister.

On 20 January 2021, it was revealed that Ministers did not consult STAC before introducing the original plans to limit gatherings over Christmas or the ban on care home visits, despite Ministers claiming decisions were made on the advice of the cell.

On 21 January 2021, a "group of key players" in the event, entertainment and nightclub industry criticised the government's support packages, warning they were "on the brink of collapse". This could lead to delays and cancellations of future events, including Liberation Day. The group state that "this is not due to our businesses being unviable or any failings in the businesses, but solely due to the Government's restrictions that we have been suffering from for 10 months and which might go on for another six or eight months."

On 18 March, the Government was criticised by the Corporate Services Scrutiny panel for not being transparent enough in pandemic-based decision making.

== Impact ==
=== Economic impact ===
As of December 2020, it is forecast the pandemic will cost £400 million, with a further £400 million tax revenue lost between 2020 and 2023.

==== Closures and shutdowns ====
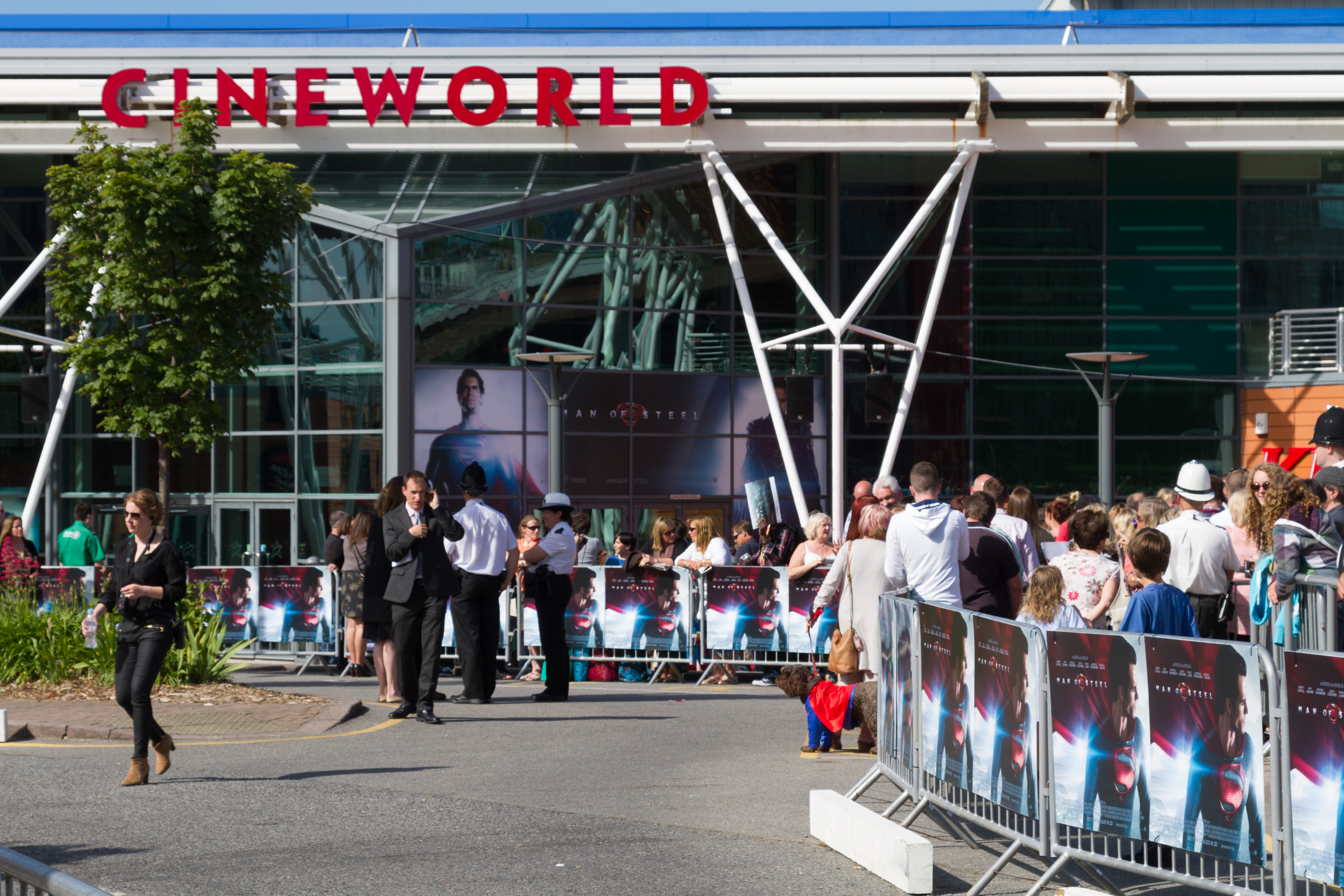
Jersey's cinema closed for five months

On 17 March 2020, Cineworld announced the closure of the only cinema on the island, remaining closed until 26 August.

On 22 March 2020, ministers announced that pubs, bars and nightclubs should close.

On 23 March 2020, government announced that its sports centres would close, and Jersey Zoo announced that it would be closed from 24 March until further notice.

==== Consumer response ====
In late February, stocks of hand sanitiser were running low, and in early March, Jersey supermarkets reported unprecedented demand for certain items such as toilet roll. Some retailers introduced restrictions to prevent people from stockpiling.

==== Tourism benefits ====
In summer 2021, due to continued travel restrictions in place in the UK, Jersey may see economic benefits from domestic tourism. Being in the Common Travel Area, travel restrictions do not apply for journeys from the island to the UK. In June 2021, easyJet announced 12 further UK routes, and low-fare airline Wizz Air would start intra-Common Travel Area services from Jersey.

=== Social impact ===
==== Education and childcare ====
On 18 March, it was announced that all schools and colleges would close for at least four weeks starting from 23 March. People deemed to work in essential roles could apply for their children to attend school or child care so that they could continue to perform their roles.

==== Event cancellations ====
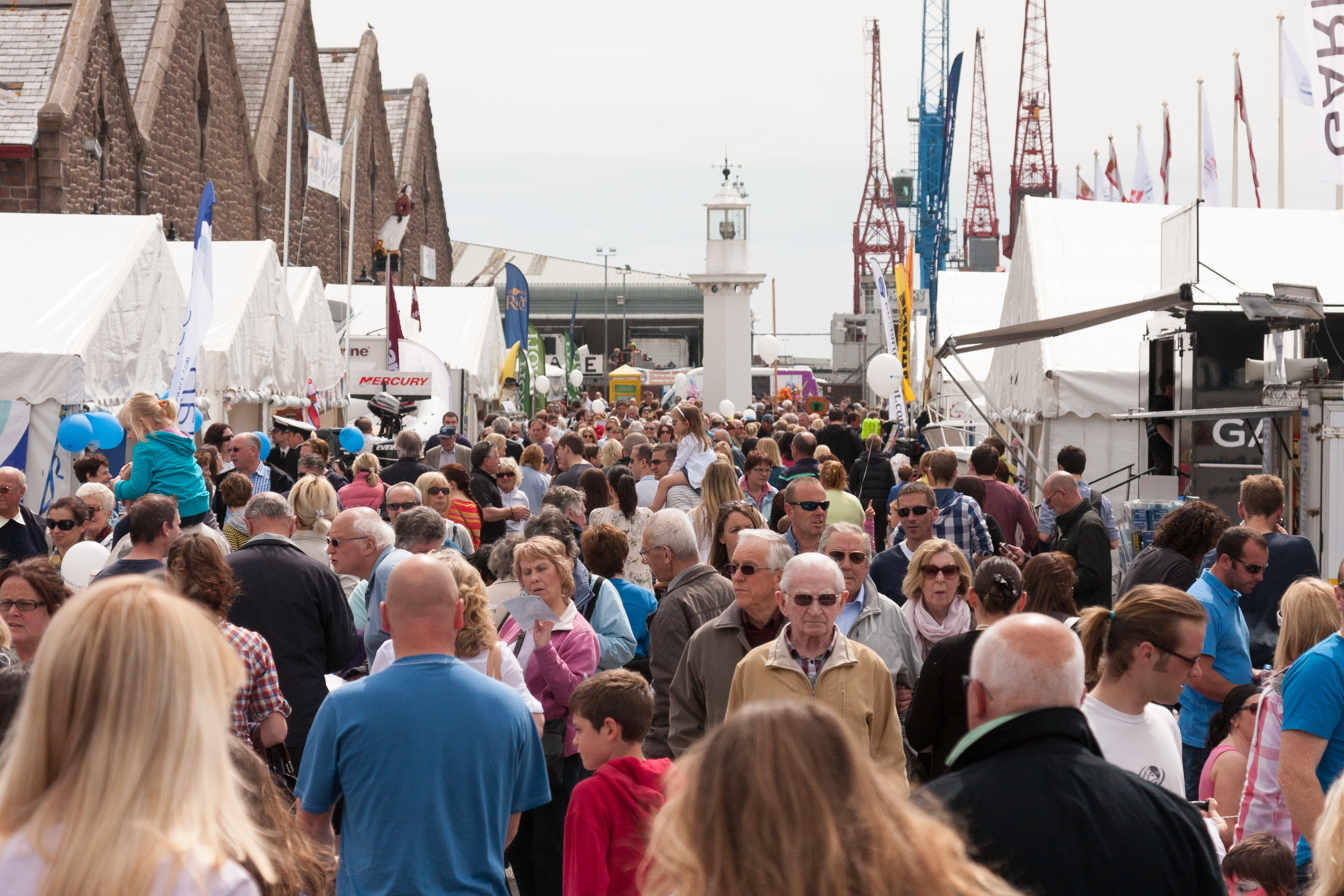
The Jersey Boat Show was one of the events cancelled

In March the Lions Club announced that its Swimarathon, a charity fund raising swimming event due to have over 3,500 participants would not take place in 2020. Organisers of the 75th Liberation Day celebrations announced that they would be scaled back. The parish of Saint Helier later announced that they would be holding a series of online events on Liberation Day. The organisers of the Jersey Battle of Flowers announced that the event, which was next due to take place in August 2020, would be cancelled for the first time in 70 years. Organisers of the 2020 TMF Island Walk announced that the annual sponsored round-the-island walk due to take place on 20 June would be postponed until later in the summer or may not take place. The event usually attracts 1,500 walkers.

The 2020 edition of the Siam Cup — the annual rugby contest between Guernsey and Jersey and the second-oldest rugby trophy in existence — would be played in May 2021. The Muratti Vase, the inter-island football competition, was also postponed.

In August the organisers of the Weekender Festival, the largest music festival in the Channel Islands, announced that the event due to take place in September 2020 had been postponed until September 2021., Around 9,000 people were due to attend. In August 2021, it was again postponed until September 2022. Organisers said any changes to restrictions before September would be "too little, too late".

The Jersey International Air Display which was due to take place on 10 September was cancelled due to concerns over whether spectators would follow the social distancing rules. The Jersey round of the Super League Triathlon scheduled for 19–20 September was also cancelled as level one of the exit from lockdown restricts sporting events to 40 spectators.

=== Travel ===
On 3 March, France and Germany were added to the list of countries from which travellers would need to self-isolate for 14 days.

==== Flights ====
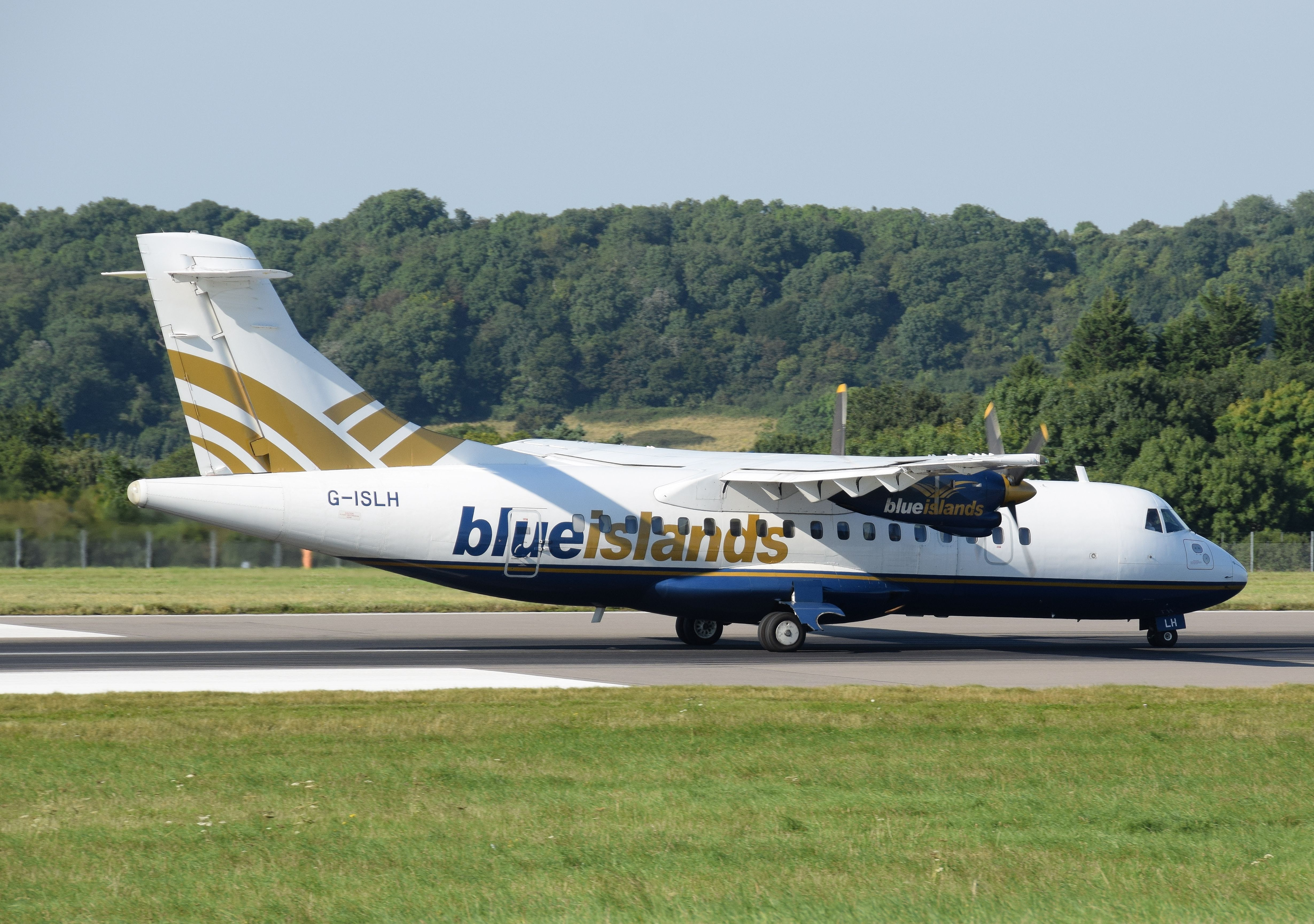
The Jersey Government made a deal with airline Blue Islands to keep lifeline air links open

On 5 March, the airline Flybe which had been founded in Jersey and serviced the most air routes from the island went into administration, citing Coronavirus as part of the reason for its collapse. On 11 March, Channel Islands airline Blue Islands announced that flights between Jersey and London City Airport would be cancelled temporarily.

On 20 March, Blue Islands announced that flights between Jersey and Guernsey would be suspended. On 28 March, Jersey Airport announced that British Airways flights between Gatwick and Jersey would be suspended from 31 March until the end of April. On 30 March, EasyJet announced that it was grounding its entire fleet until further notice. EasyJet operated several flights a day between Jersey and London Gatwick as well as to eight other regional airports such as Liverpool.

On 1 April, the Jersey government announced that it was in negotiation with Blue Islands for the airline to provide continuity of air travel to the UK for passengers whose travel was deemed essential. This was agreed, and from 20 April three regular flights would be flown to Southampton per week. On 20 April, it was announced that nobody would be allowed to board a Blue Islands aircraft without government approval for the journey. Everyone arriving in the Island was subject to 14 days self-isolation unless exempted, each application for exemption being treated on its merits.

From 26 May, Blue Islands would run a weekly flight to Gatwick. On 16 June, Jersey's Treasury Minister revealed in the States Assembly that Government was considering a £10m loan to Blue Islands to ensure the continuation of lifeline links to and from the island.

For a time in November 2020, British Airways suspended flights to the island leaving Blue Islands and EasyJet as the only airlines operating to Jersey. On Saturday 21 November there were no commercial flights in or out of the island, a very rare occurrence. Inter-island flights are seldom cancelled, even during the air travel disruption after the 2010 Eyjafjallajökull eruption.

==== Ferries ====
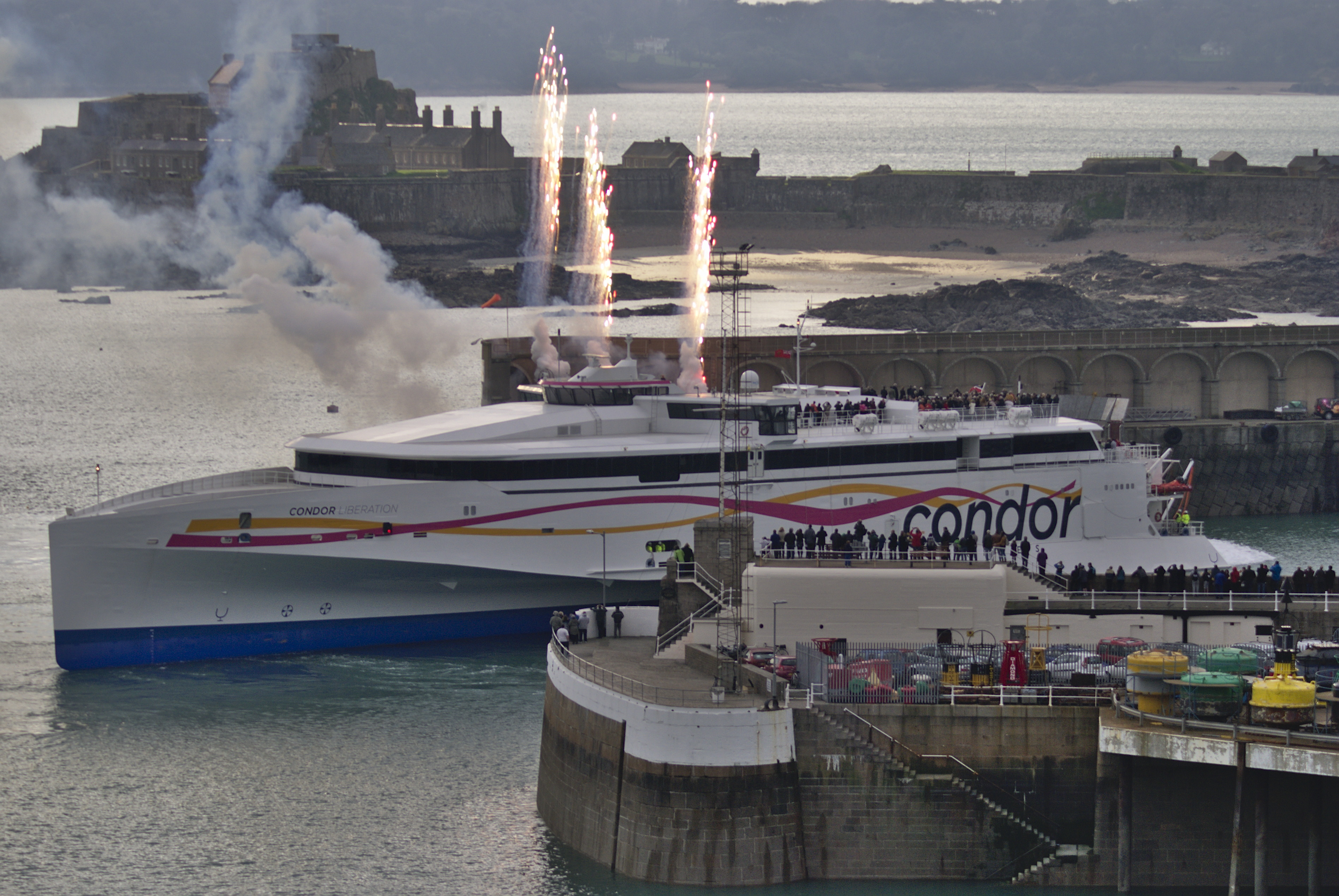
Condor Ferries' operations were severely disrupted

On 13 March, Condor Ferries announced that the Commodore Clipper would not carry passengers for a month in order to ensure the continuity of its freight service using the ship. On 17 March, it announced that sailings to and from Saint-Malo would be suspended from 24 March to at least 2 April. The company subsequently announced that it would cancel all passenger sailings from 27 March until at least 30 April. This was later extended to 14 May and again until 12 June. Ferries to and from Saint-Malo resumed on 17 July.

Condor's schedule of sailings was reduced again during the second wave, with its fast ferries cancelled until April 2021. However, when three of its crew on its freight ship MV Commodore Goodwill were tested positive, Condor announced that the Commodore Clipper conventional ferry would only carry unaccompanied freight, with passengers being transferred to its fast ferries. Passengers must provide evidence of a negative result from a test taken in the 72 hours before departure.

==== Buses ====
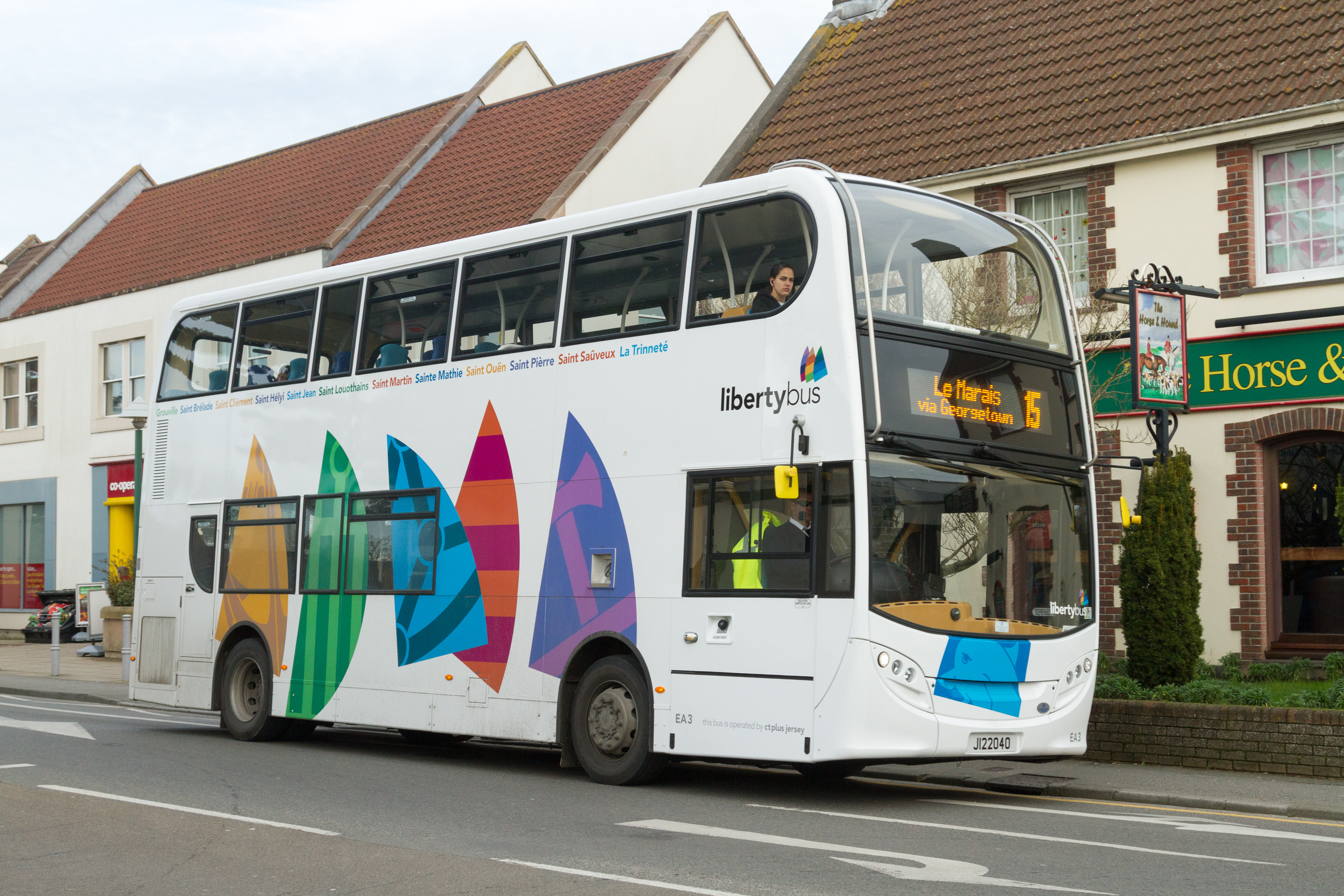
LibertyBus ran a reduced timetable during lockdown

The island's bus operator LibertyBus ran a reduced timetable from 28 March until 1 September. Face masks became compulsory on buses from 27 July, and in the bus terminal from 26 October.

== Statistics ==
=== Data per day ===
==== 2020 ====
The figures below count only confirmed cases from tests; the actual number of infections and cases are likely to be higher than reported.

Data sourced from the Government of Jersey website.

Data for March to June 2020
Date	Confirmed cases		Deaths		Negative results		Confirmed recoveries	
Date	New	Total	New	Total	New	Total	New	Total
10 March	1	1	0	0	–	84		
11 March	1	2	0	0	6	90		
12 March	0	2	0	0	19	109		
13 March	0	2	0	0	23	132		
14 March	0	2	0	0	33	165		
15 March	0	2	0	0	15	180		
16 March	3	5	0	0	35	215		
17 March	0	5	0	0	6	221		
18 March	1	6	0	0	72	293		
19 March	4	10	0	0	30	323		
20 March	2	12	0	0	49	372		
21 March	3	15	0	0	11	383		
22 March	No data published							
23 March	1	16	0	0	22	405		
24 March	0	16	0	0	0	405		
25 March	No data published							
26 March	16	32	1	1	67	472		
27 March	20	52	0	1	129	601		
28 March	9	61	0	1	49	650		
29 March	2	63	1	2	18	668		
30 March	18	81	0	2	80	748		
31 March	0	81	0	2	0	748		
1 April	No data published							
2 April	15	96	0	2	124	872		
3 April	22	118	0	2	120	992		
4 April	8	126	1	3	124	1,116		
5 April	29	155	0	3	112	1,228		
6 April	14	169	0	3	60	1,274		
7 April	1	170	0	3	5	1,278		
8 April	0	170	0	3	44	1,322		
9 April	13	183	0	3	146	1,455		
10 April	15	198	0	3	38	1,493		
11 April	No data published							
12 April	15	213	0	3	67	1,560		
13 April	4	217	0	3	23	1,583		
14 April	0	217	3	6	9	1,592		
15 April	2	219	1	7	27	1,619		
16 April	4	223	3	10	27	1,646	–	–
17 April	11	234	1	11	72	1,718	–	–
18 April	11	245	1	12	92	1,810	–	–
19 April	4	249	0	12	30	1,840	–	–
20 April	0	249	2	14	40	1,880	118	118
21 April	6	255	0	14	39	1,919	15	133
22 April	0	255	4	18	54	1,973	18	151
23 April	21	276	1	19	64	2,037	10	161
24 April	2	278	0	19	89	2,126	4	165
25 April	2	280	0	19	47	2,173	0	165
26 April	1	281	0	19	18	2,191	0	170
27 April	2	283	0	19	58	2,249	11	181
28 April	1	284	1	20	40	2,289	4	185
29 April	2	286	1	21	63	2,352	5	190
30 April	0	286	2	23	114	2,466	7	197
1 May	0	286	1	24	66	2,532	0	197
2 May	5	291	0	24	40	2,572	0	197
3 May	1	292	0	24	131	2,703	2	199
4 May	1	293	0	24	56	2,759	6	205
5 May	0	293	0	24	19	2,778	2	207
6 May	0	293	1	25	34	2,812	0	207
7 May	0	293	0	25	81	2,893	0	207
8 May	0	293	0	25	96	2,989	15	222
9 May	0	293	0	25	107	3,096	3	225
10 May	1	294	0	25	144	3,240	1	226
11 May	0	294	0	25	84	3,324	0	226
12 May	1	295	1	26	56	3,380	0	226
13 May	1	296	1	27	101	3,481	0	226
14 May	1	297	0	27	83	3,564	0	226
15 May	0	297	0	27	75	3,639	0	226
16 May	5	302	0	27	189	3,828	0	226
17 May	0	302	0	27	97	3,925	0	226
18 May	1	303	0	27	228	4,153	17	243
19 May	0	303	1	28	14	4,167	1	244
20 May	3	306	1	29	165	4,332	12	256
21 May	0	306	0	29	227	4,559	16	272
22 May	0	306	0	29	188	4,747	0	272
23 May	0	306	0	29	209	4,956	7	279
24 May	0	306	0	29	163	5,119	1	280
25 May	1	307	0	29	185	5,304	0	280
26 May	0	307	0	29	286	5,590	0	280
27 May	1	308	0	29	121	5,711	0	284
28 May	0	308	0	29	193	5,904	3	287
29 May	0	308	0	29	202	6,106	0	287
30 May	0	308	0	29	175	6,281	0	287
31 May	0	308	0	29	299	6,580	3	290
1 June	0	308	0	29	204	6,784	0	290
2 June	0	308	1	30	233	7,017	0	290
3 June	1	309	0	30	226	7,243	0	290
4 June	0	309	0	30	157	7,400	0	290
5 June	0	309	0	30	473	7,873	0	290
6 June	2	311	0	30	282	8,155	0	290
7 June	No data published							
8 June	1	312	0	30	592	8,747	1	291
9 June	1	313	0	30	163	8,910	1	292
10 June	0	313	0	30	297	9,207	0	292
11 June	0	313	0	30	305	9,512	0	292
12 June	0	313	0	30	383	9,895	0	292
13 June	0	313	0	30	283	10,178	2	294
14 June	No data published							
15 June	3	316	0	30	552	10,730	1	295
16 June	0	316	0	30	131	10,861	1	296
17 June	2	318	0	30	161	11,022	0	296
18 June	0	318	0	30	198	11,220	0	296
19 June	0	318	1	31	398	11,618	1	297
20 June	0	318	0	31	260	11,878	0	297
21 June	No data published							
22 June	0	318	0	31	609	12,487	0	297
23 June	0	318	0	31	187	12,674	0	297
24 June	1	319	0	31	463	13,137	0	297
25 June	0	319	0	31	243	13,380	0	297
26 June	0	319	0	31	287	13,667	1	298
27 June	No data published							
28 June	No data published							
29 June	0	319	0	31	826	14,493	3	301
30 June	0	319	0	31	182	14,675	2	303

Data for July to September 2020
Date	Confirmed cases		Deaths		Negative results		Confirmed recoveries	
Date	New	Total	New	Total	New	Total	New	Total
1 July	0	319	0	31	409	15,084	0	303
2 July	1	320	0	31	315	15,399	0	303
3 July	0	320	0	31	372	15,771	0	303
4 July	No data published							
5 July	No data published							
6 July	5	325	0	31	1,257	17,028	0	303
7 July	0	325	0	31	399	17,427	0	303
8 July	0	325	0	31	565	17,992	0	303
9 July	0	325	0	31	561	18,553	0	303
10 July	0	325	0	31	521	19,074	1	304
11 July	No data published							
12 July	No data published							
13 July	4	329	0	31	1,667	20,741	0	304
14 July	0	329	0	31	316	21,057	1	305
15 July	0	329	0	31	831	21,888	2	307
16 July	2	331	0	31	535	22,423	1	308
17 July	0	331	0	31	459	22,982	2	310
18 July	No data published							
19 July	No data published							
20 July	0	331	0	31	2,477	25,459	0	310
21 July	0	331	0	31	875	26,334	1	311
22 July	0	331	0	31	879	27,213	1	312
23 July	0	331	0	31	766	27,979	0	312
24 July	1	332	0	31	764	28,743	2	314
25 July	No data published							
26 July	No data published							
27 July	2	334	0	31	2,501	31,244	0	314
28 July	1	335	0	31	1,548	32,792	0	314
29 July	0	335	0	31	727	33,519	0	314
30 July	0	335	0	31	1,003	34,522	1	315
31 July	0	335	0	31	711	35,233	0	315
1 August	No data published							
2 August	No data published							
3 August	4	339	0	31	3,592	38,825	2	317
4 August	4	343	0	31	1,276	40,101	3	320
5 August	1	344	0	31	1,559	41,660	1	321
6 August	1	345	0	31	1,232	42,892	0	321
7 August	0	345	0	31	873	43,765	1	322
8 August	No data published							
9 August	No data published							
10 August	2	347	0	31	5,012	48,777	2	324
11 August	0	347	0	31	1,310	50,087	0	324
12 August	4	351	0	31	1,813	51,900	0	324
13 August	0	351	0	31	1,171	53,071	0	324
14 August	4	355	0	31	977	54,048	0	324
15 August	No data published							
16 August	No data published							
17 August	2	357	1	32	5,464	59,412	4	328
18 August	1	358	0	32	1,191	60,603	0	328
19 August	3	361	0	32	3,688	64,291	1	329
20 August	1	362	0	32	997	65,288	3	332
21 August	1	363	0	32	2,039	67,327	0	332
22 August	No data published							
23 August	No data published							
24 August	1	364	0	32	4,772	72,099	7	339
25 August	4	368	0	32	1,915	74,014	2	341
26 August	3	371	0	32	1,105	75,119	2	343
27 August	1	372	0	32	862	75,981	1	344
28 August	1	373	0	32	1,626	77,607	0	344
29 August	No data published							
30 August	No data published							
31 August	No data published							
1 September	5	378	0	32	6,148	83,755	3	347
2 September	3	381	0	32	791	84,546	2	349
3 September	−8	373	0	32	1,183	85,729	−6	343
4 September	1	374	0	32	1,255	86,984	1	344
5 September	No data published							
6 September	No data published							
7 September	1	375	0	32	4,308	91,292	2	346
8 September	1	376	0	32	1,582	92,874	4	350
9 September	2	378	0	32	868	93,742	1	351
10 September	1	379	0	32	769	94,511	0	351
11 September	1	380	0	32	1,300	95,811	2	353
12 September	No data published							
13 September	No data published							
14 September	6	386	0	32	4,843	100,654	4	357
15 September	0	386	0	32	1,485	102,139	0	357
16 September	3	389	0	32	704	102,843	1	358
17 September	2	391	0	32	1,095	103,938	0	358
18 September	2	393	0	32	899	104,837	0	358
19 September	No data published							
20 September	No data published							
21 September	3	396	0	32	4,219	109,056	3	361
22 September	2	398	0	32	1,259	110,315	2	363
23 September	1	399	0	32	970	111,285	2	365
24 September	0	399	0	32	683	111,968	0	365
25 September	1	400	0	32	1,067	113,035	1	366
26 September	No data published							
27 September	No data published							
28 September	8	408	0	32	3,624	116,659	3	369
29 September	1	409	0	32	1,151	117,810	3	372
30 September	5	414	0	32	889	118,699	3	375

Data for October to December 2020
Date	Confirmed cases		Deaths		Negative results		Confirmed recoveries	
Date	New	Total	New	Total	New	Total	New	Total
1 October	5	419	0	32	662	119,361	3	378
2 October	2	421	0	32	1,231	120,592	1	379
3 October	No data published							
4 October	No data published							
5 October	10	431	0	32	3,101	123,693	1	380
6 October	7	438	0	32	1,125	124,718	0	380
7 October	3	441	0	32	760	125,478	0	380
8 October	2	443	0	32	1,049	126,527	2	382
9 October	6	449	0	32	1,027	127,554	2	384
10 October	No data published							
11 October	No data published							
12 October	30	479	0	32	3,612	131,166	13	397
13 October	4	483	0	32	1,351	132,517	0	397
14 October	4	487	0	32	1,117	133,634	2	399
15 October	3	490	0	32	714	134,348	6	405
16 October	0	490	0	32	957	135,305	1	406
17 October	No data published							
18 October	No data published							
19 October	19	509	0	32	3,688	138,993	8	414
20 October	7	516	0	32	655	139,648	2	416
21 October	7	523	0	32	1,052	140,700	4	420
22 October	3	526	0	32	1,188	141,888	4	424
23 October	4	530	0	32	978	142,866	2	426
24 October	No data published							
25 October	No data published							
26 October	26	556	0	32	2,190	145,056	34	460
27 October	4	560	0	32	865	145,921	5	465
28 October	6	566	0	32	708	146,629	0	465
29 October	3	569	0	32	795	147,424	2	467
30 October	5	574	0	32	916	148,340	11	478
31 October	No data published							
1 November	No data published							
2 November	17	591	0	32	1,853	150,193	21	499
3 November	17	608	0	32	699	150,892	4	503
4 November	12	620	0	32	699	151,860	1	504
5 November	12	632	0	32	628	152,488	10	514
6 November	11	643	0	32	2,472	154,960	2	516
7 November	No data published							
8 November	No data published							
9 November	29	672	0	32	3,446	158,406	18	534
10 November	18	690	0	32	969	159,375	7	541
11 November	14	704	0	32	1,761	161,136	10	551
12 November	17	721	0	32	592	161,748	5	556
13 November	11	732	0	32	1,539	163,287	1	557
14 November	No data published							
15 November	No data published							
16 November	32	764	0	32	2,541	165,828	21	578
17 November	11	775	0	32	1,098	166,926	17	595
18 November	11	786	0	32	763	167,689	3	598
19 November	11	797	0	32	1,125	168,814	5	603
20 November	14	811	0	32	777	169,591	17	620
21 November	No data published							
22 November	No data published							
23 November	24	835	0	32	3,088	172,679	29	649
24 November	6	841	0	32	678	173,357	19	668
25 November	21	862	0	32	2,110	175,467	22	690
26 November	35	897	0	32	907	176,374	3	693
27 November	31	928	0	32	737	177,111	12	705
28 November	No data published							
29 November	No data published							
30 November	84	1,012	0	32	3,807	180,918	37	742
1 December	42	1,054	0	32	1,859	182,777	11	753
2 December	56	1,110	0	32	1,371	184,148	3	756
3 December	60	1,170	0	32	2,540	186,688	13	769
4 December	68	1,238	0	32	2,286	188,974	5	774
5 December	23	1,261	0	32	1,114	190,088	13	787
6 December	96	1,357	0	32	1,421	191,509	30	817
7 December	31	1,388	0	32	2,067	193,576	11	828
8 December	72	1,460	0	32	1,161	194,737	29	857
9 December	37	1,497	0	32	2,381	197,118	14	871
10 December	58	1,555	0	32	2,087	199,205	30	901
11 December	82	1,637	0	32	2,165	201,370	45	946
12 December	51	1,688	0	32	2,403	203,773	46	992
13 December	91	1,779	0	32	1,864	205,637	24	1,016
14 December	63	1,842	0	32	1,109	206,746	26	1,042
15 December	59	1,901	0	32	2,636	209,382	22	1,064
16 December	100	2,001	0	32	1,867	211,249	30	1,094
17 December	97	2,098	1	33	3,404	214,653	101	1,195
18 December	136	2,234	3	36	828	215,481	65	1,260
19 December	22	2,256	0	36	2,045	217,526	55	1,315
20 December	80	2,336	0	36	1,690	219,216	55	1,370
21 December	109	2,445	2	38	1,386	220,602	27	1,397
22 December	38	2,483	1	39	2,514	223,116	67	1,464
23 December	77	2,560	1	40	1,198	224,314	77	1,541
24 December	23	2,583	1	41	1,952	226,266	80	1,621
25 December	No data published							
26 December	No data published							
27 December	80	2,663	0	41	3,536	229,802	146	1,767
28 December	29	2,692	0	41	777	230,579	192	1,859
29 December	15	2,707	0	41	1,118	231,697	43	1,902
30 December	19	2,726	1	42	1,337	233,134	76	1,978
31 December	34	2,760	2	44	1,796	234,930	188	2,166

==== 2021 ====
Data sourced from the Government of Jersey website.

1 January 2021 to 26 January 2021
Date	Confirmed cases		Deaths		Confirmed recoveries		Total vaccines given	
Date	New	Total	New	Total	New	Total	First	Second
1 January 2021	No data published							
2 January	No data published							
3 January	61	2,821	0	44	176	2,342		
4 January	21	2,842	3	47	69	2,411		
5 January	21	2,863	4	51	62	2,473		
6 January	29	2,892	2	53	43	2,516		
7 January	16	2,908	3	56	45	2,561		
8 January	13	2,921	1	57	20	2,581		
9 January	37	2,958	0	57	32	2,613		
10 January	24	2,972	0	57	32	2,622	3,590	1,306
11 January	21	2,993	2	59	20	2,642		
12 January	10	3,003	0	59	22	2,664		
13 January	13	3,016	1	60	18	2,682		
14 January	13	3,029	0	60	28	2,710		
15 January	15	3,044	2	62	11	2,721		
16 January	3	3,047	0	62	17	2,738		
17 January	7	3,054	0	62	23	2,761	5,845	2,000+
18 January	7	3,061	0	62	23	2,784		
19 January	16	3,077	0	62	34	2,818		
20 January	11	3,088	0	62	26	2,844		
21 January	9	3,097	0	62	14	2,858		
22 January	7	3,104	1	63	21	2,879		
23 January	12	3,116	0	63	16	2,895		
24 January	6	3,122						
25 January	3	3,125						
26 January	5	3,130						

=== Graphs ===
Total cases 2021

Deaths in 2020 and 2021

Total cases 2020

New cases per week

== See also ==
- COVID-19 pandemic by country and territory
- COVID-19 pandemic in Europe
- COVID-19 pandemic in the United Kingdom
- COVID-19 pandemic in Guernsey
- COVID-19 pandemic in the Isle of Man
