= Health in Jersey =

Health in Jersey refers to the overall health of the population of the Bailiwick of Jersey, the largest of the Channel Islands. Life expectancy at birth for men in Jersey in 2017 was 80.6 years and for women 84.9 years.

The States of Jersey Police report that there was an increase in activity related to mental health of 178% between 2012 and 2016.

== Health status ==
=== Births ===
In 2018, there were 942 births to Jersey-resident mothers. The median age of mothers was 33. The birth rate in Jersey per 1,000 women was 8.89. This was lower than the England rate of 11.6 in 2017. Jersey has had a lower birth rate than England since 2000. The rate of pregnancy terminations in 2018 per 1,000 women was 9.5. This is much lower than the England and Wales rate of 17.3 per 1,000 women in 2017.

Births to Jersey-resident mothers since 1993
Year	Total number of births
1993	1057
1994	1142
1995	1110
1996	1112
1997	1102
1998	1128
1999	1076
2000	978
2001	981
2002	933
2003	1009
2004	973
2005	970
2006	962
2007	1031
2008	1038
2009	1006
2010	1077
2011	1075
2012	1124
2013	1029
2014	985
2015	1021
2016	1020
2017	954
2018	942

=== Life expectancy ===
The life expectancy at birth for a Jersey resident was 82.6 in 2016. At the age of 65, this figure was 20.6 in 2016. Males in Jersey have lower life expectancy both at birth and at age 65 than Females. At birth, the gap is around 3.8 years.

=== Deaths ===
There were 820 deaths of Jersey residents in 2018. The median age of death was 81. The crude death rate was 7.71 per 1,000 population in 2018. The number of premature deaths for 2014-16 (that is deaths before the age of 75) was 777. This latter figure is higher in males than females.

As at 12 March 2021, during the 2020-21 Covid-19 pandemic in Jersey, the island recorded 69 total deaths due to Covid-19. Of these, 52 were laboratory proven to be due to Covid-19. The deaths mostly affected males (62%) and those aged above the age of 80 (80-89, 44.9% of deaths; 90+, 20.3% of deaths).

== See also ==
- List of hospitals in Jersey
- Healthcare in Jersey
