= Jersey International Air Display =

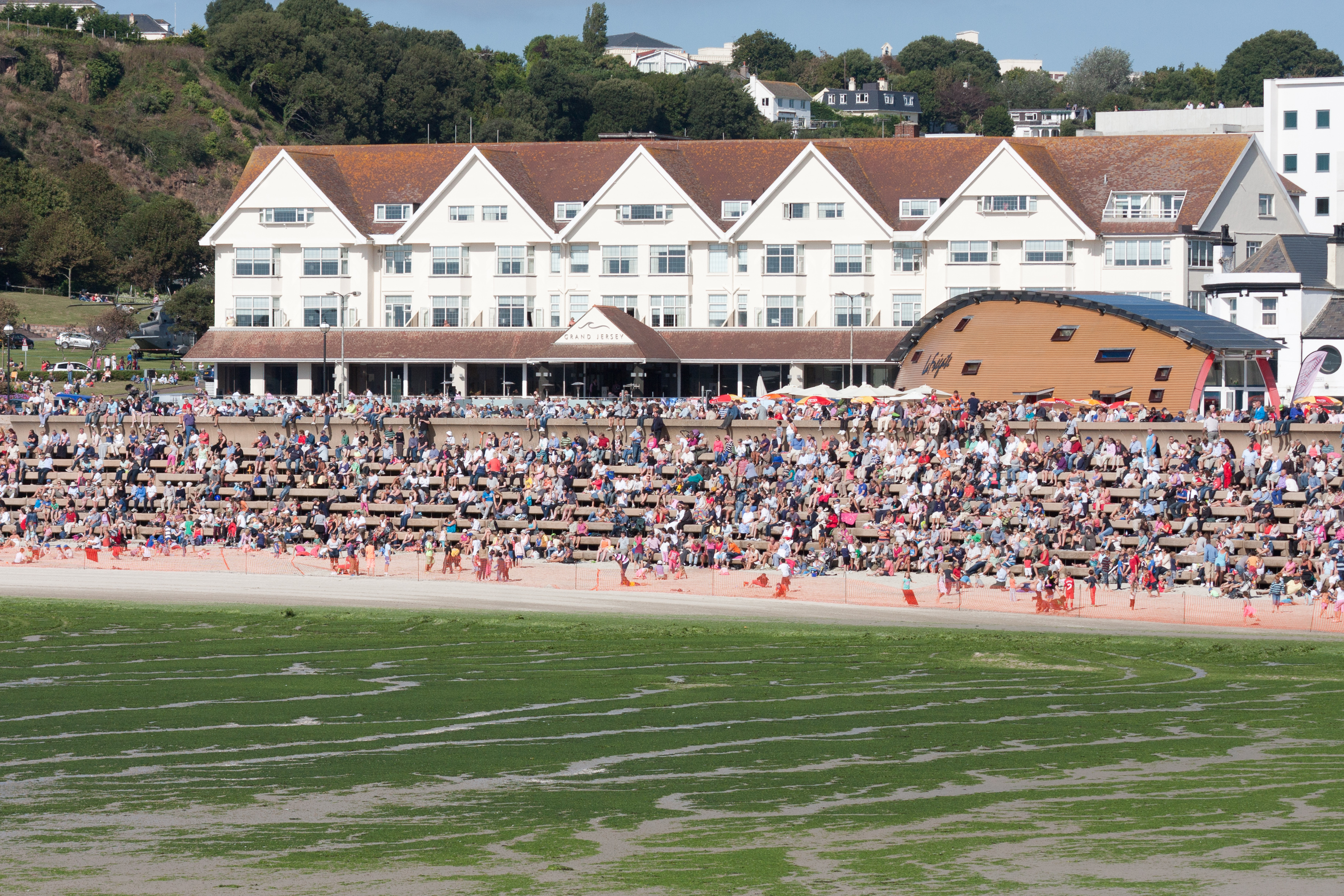
- Crowds watch the display in 2012.
- Genre: military and civilian air show
- Dates: September
- Frequency: Annually
- Venue: Jersey Airport
- Locations: Jersey, Channel Islands
- Country: Jersey
- Established: 1952
- Website: www.jerseyairdisplay.org.uk

The Jersey International Air Display is an air show which is held every year on the island of Jersey, in the Channel Islands. It normally consists of one air display and two static displays - one at the airport and one in a park in St. Helier.

It is a non-profit-making event, and relies upon sponsorship and government funding. The main display can be watched by the public, free of charge.

Some of the aircraft carry out displays over Guernsey, as part of the Guernsey Air Display (formerly the Guernsey Battle of Britain Air Display), on the same day.

== Performers ==
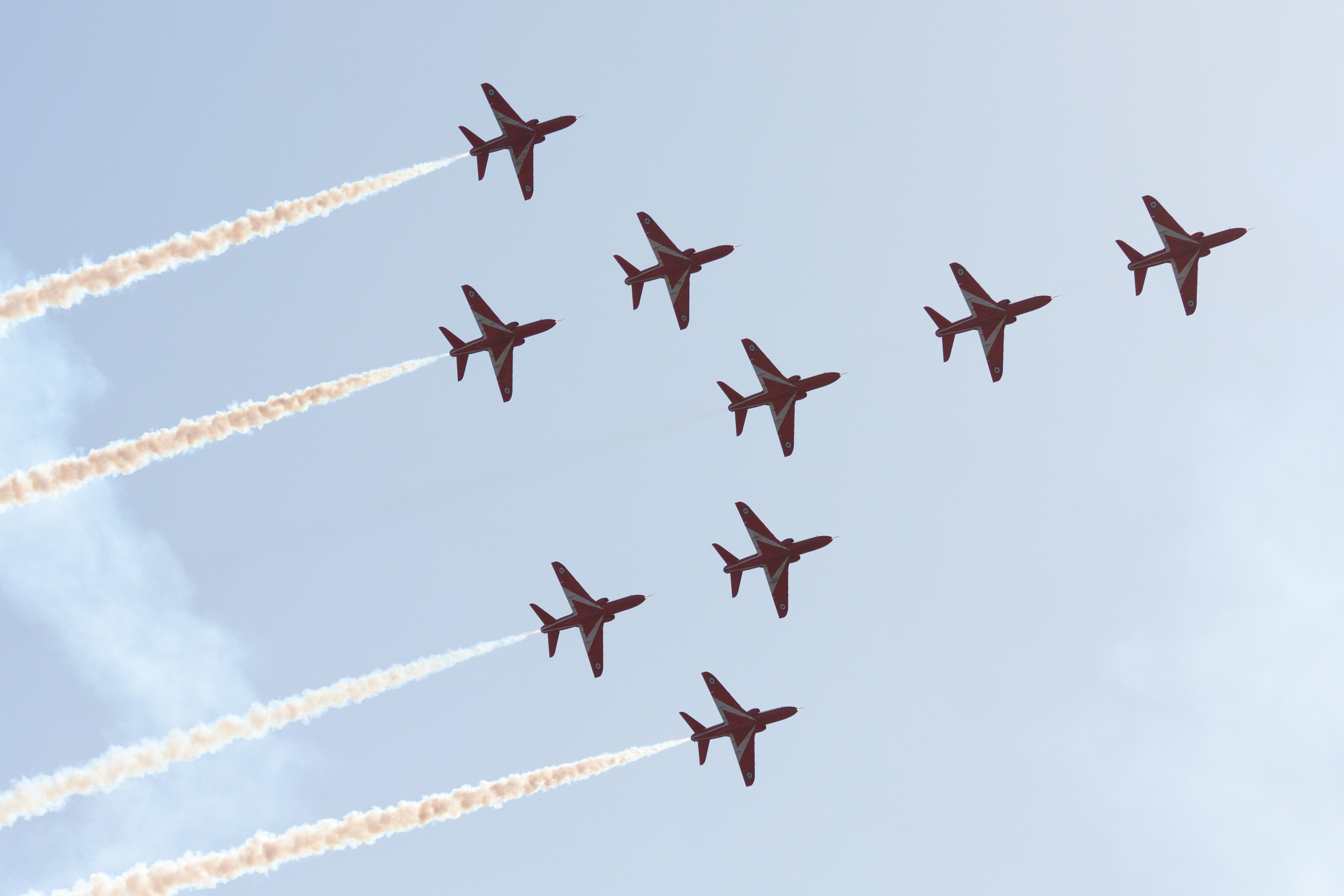
The Red Arrows performing during the 2009 show.

Regular performers include the Red Arrows, RAF Falcons parachute display team, and the Battle of Britain Memorial Flight.

Notable appearances include;

- Avro Lancaster (BBMF)
- Avro Vulcan
- B-17 Flying Fortress
- B-52 Stratofortress
- BAF F-16 Fighting Falcon
- Eurofighter Typhoon
- Grumman TBF Avenger
- Hawker Hurricane (BBMF)
- Hawker Siddeley Harrier
- North American B-25 Mitchell
- Spitfire (BBMF)
- Tornado GR4
- Westland Dragonfly
- Yves Rossy (Jetman)
- BAe Nimrod - The last ever display appearance of the Nimrod MRA4 took place at the Jersey Airshow in 2010
- Saab Viggen - First ever UK appearance of the Swedish Historic Flight Viggen
- Saab Tunnan
- Saab 105
- Saab Lansen

== History ==
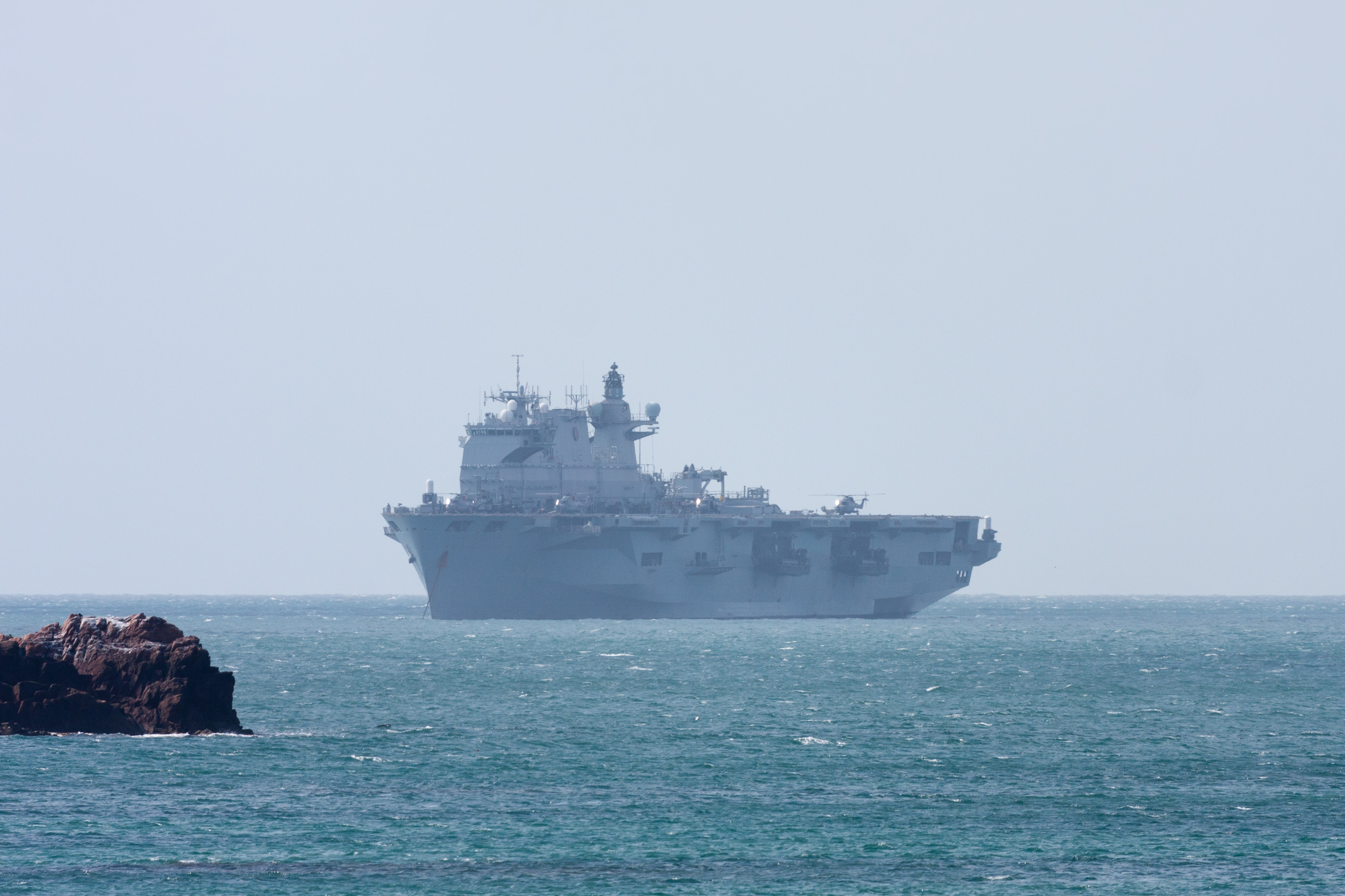
HMS Ocean anchored off St. Helier during the 2009 show.

In 1997, Mike Higgins became the display organiser.

In 2009, HMS Ocean (L12) was present, and participated in the event.

The 2011 air display was canceled, due to poor visibility, shortly before it was due to start. Most aircraft which were due to take part had already arrived at the island.

The display was also cancelled in 2020 due to the social distancing restrictions during the COVID-19 pandemic in Jersey.

== Accidents and incidents related to air show ==
- September 1991: The Hawker Hurricane IIC LF363 suffered an engine failure en route to Jersey and crash-landed at RAF Wittering.
- 6 September 2006: A privately owned T-33 crashed on take-off close to the Imperial War Museum Duxford, on its way to the Jersey show.
- 10 September 2003: A Harrier jet experienced hydraulic problems shortly before landing at Jersey Airport.
- 9 September 2003: A Hawk overshot the runway while landing at Jersey Airport in advance of an air display. Minor damage was caused to the aircraft.
