= Jersey General Hospital =

- Government of Jersey
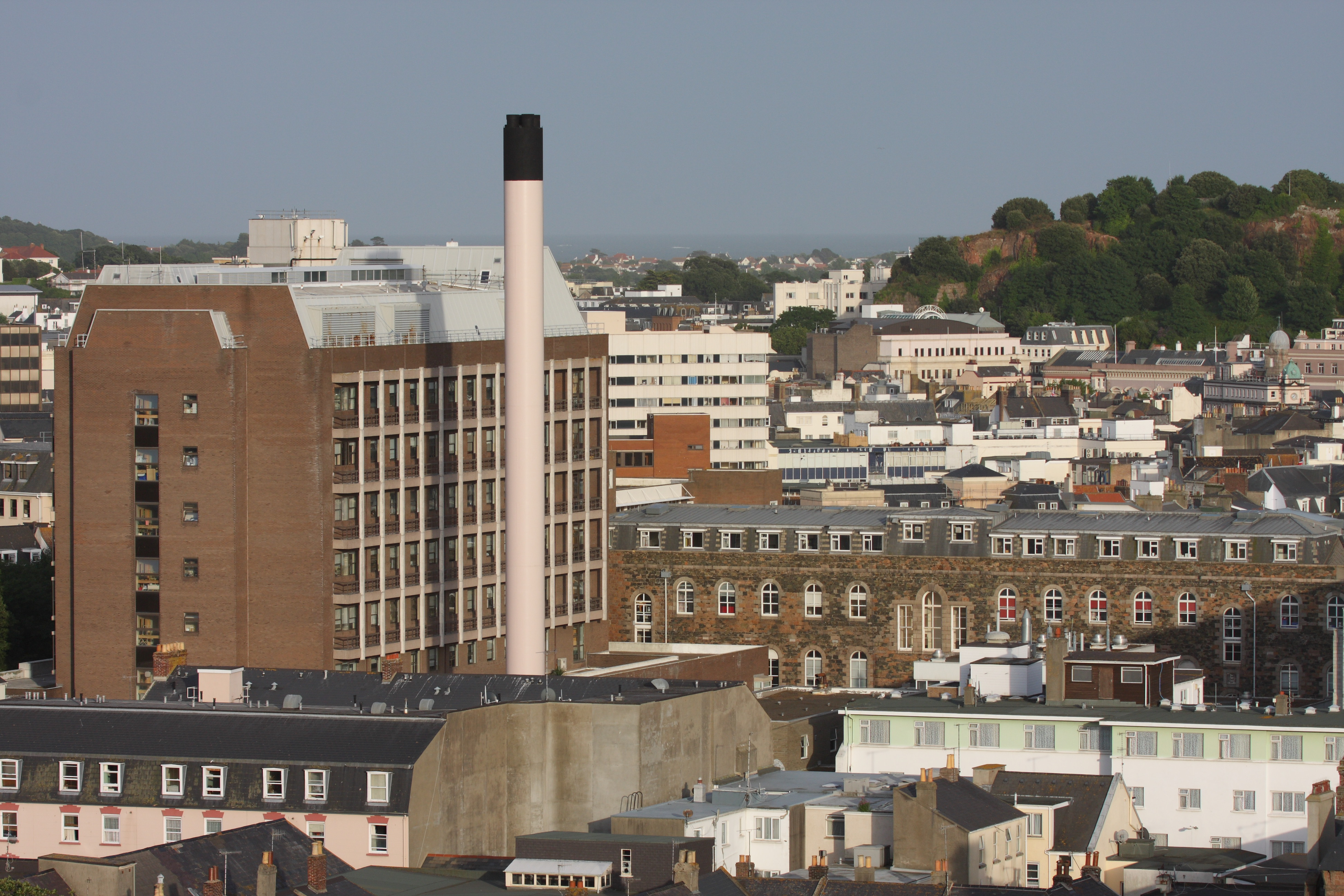
- The hospital in 2008

Geography
- Location: St Helier, Jersey
- Coordinates: 49.1875°N 2.1123°W

Organisation
- Type: General
- Affiliated university: University of Southampton School of Medicine

Services
- Emergency department: Yes
- Beds: 219

History
- Opened: 1793

Jersey General Hospital in Saint Helier is the only hospital on the island of Jersey. It has 219 beds.

Medical students are placed at the hospital by the Wessex Deanery of Health Education England.

== History ==
It was originally a poorhouse. The foundation stone was laid in 1765 but the building was requisitioned by the military in 1779 as there was no barracks on the island. It was used as a hospital poorhouse from 1793. The building was largely destroyed by fire in 1859. Until 1868, when St Saviour's Hospital was opened, it also served as a lunatic asylum.

There were plans to replace it with a single-site facility at Overdale, costed at £804 million; however, in November 2022 it was reported that the plans were now for a hybrid General Hospital spread across the existing Gloucester Street site, adjacent land at Kensington Place, and Overdale.

== Facilities ==
- Rheumatology
- Maternity
- Special care baby unit (SCBU)
- Emergency Department
- Paediatrics
- Assisted reproduction
- Dermatology
- Blood donation
- Ear, Nose and Throat (ENT)
- Endoscopy
- Cardiology
- Dental
- Dietetics
- Pharmacy
- Renal
- Joint replacement
- Memory
- Neurology
- Occupational therapy (OT)
- Ophthalmology
- Orthoptics
- Pain clinic
- Speech and language therapy
- Intensive care unit (ICU)
- Radiology

For specialised treatment that is not available in Jersey, patients are transferred to hospitals in Guernsey and the United Kingdom.
