= St Saviour's Hospital =

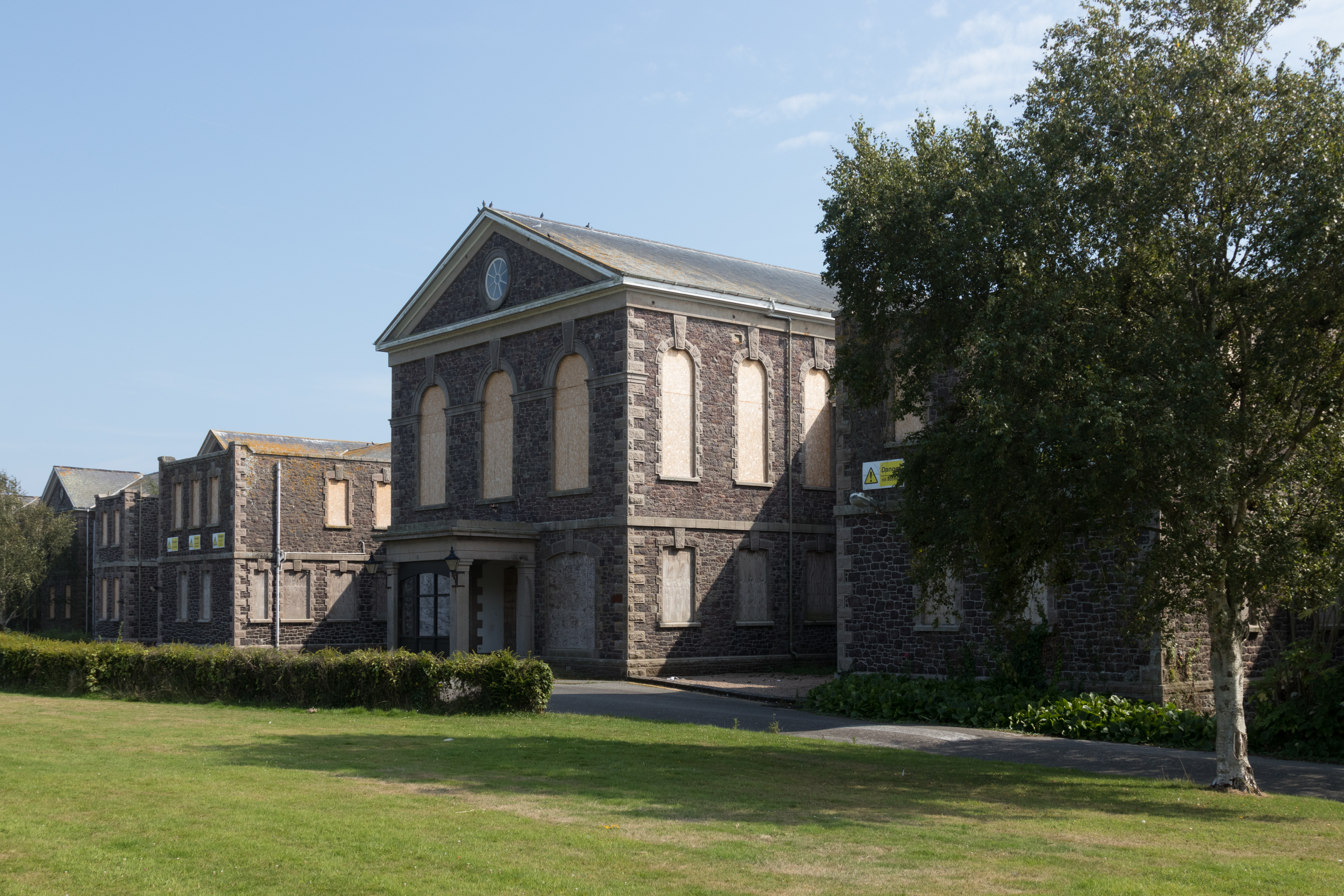
- St Saviour's Hospital

Geography
- Coordinates: 49°12′06″N 2°02′37″W

Services
- Beds: 28

History
- Opened: July 1868

St Saviour's Hospital, formerly called the Jersey Lunatic Asylum, opened in July 1868.

The States Assembly were extremely reluctant to spend money on a purpose-built lunatic asylum, and Sir Robert Percy Douglas Lieutenant Governor of Jersey was forced to intervene. The architect was Thomas Gallichan. Its name was changed to the Jersey Mental Hospital in 1952 and then again to St Saviour's Hospital in 1963.

The Criminal Justice (Insane Persons) (Jersey) Law of 1964 specifically authorises detention in St. Saviour’s Hospital.

A new mental health clinic for older people was opened on the site in 2014, with two wards with a total of 28 acute assessment and treatment beds.

There have been several proposals to sell the site, which is said to be worth as much as £15 million.
