= Saint Helier Harbour =

Harbour on the island of Jersey

Coordinates: 49.182106°N 2.1109°W

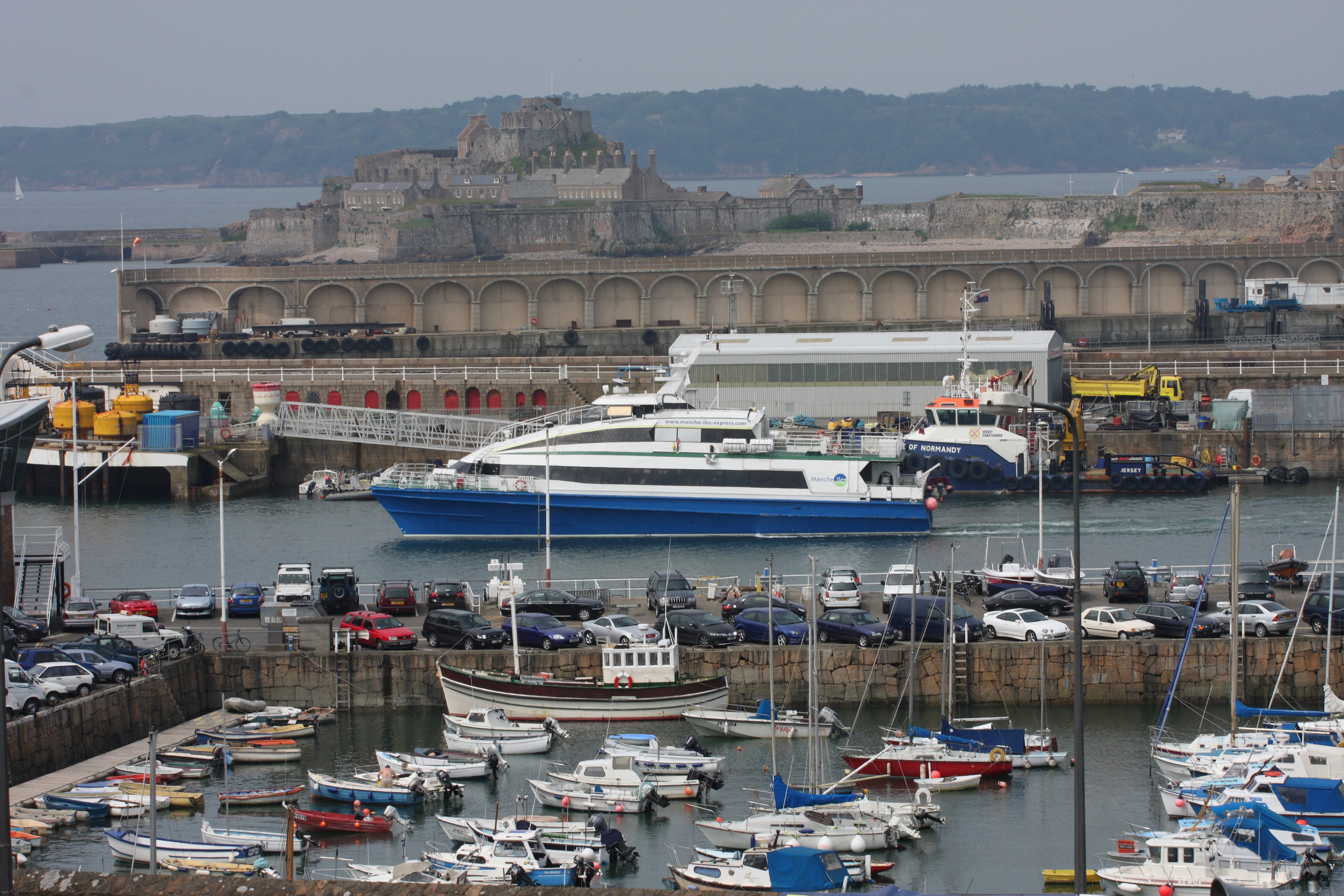
- A foot passenger ferry leaving the main harbour, with the old harbour in the foreground
- Interactive map of Saint Helier Harbour

Location
- Country: Jersey
- Location: St Helier
- UN/LOCODE: JE STH

Details
- Opened: c. 1790
- Operated by: Ports of Jersey
- Owned by: States of Jersey
- No. of piers: 5

Statistics
- Passenger traffic: 750,000
- Website; Official website

Saint Helier Harbour is the main harbour on the Channel Island of Jersey. It is on the south coast of the island, occupying most of the coast of the main town of St Helier. It is operated by Ports of Jersey, a company wholly owned by the Government of Jersey.

Facilities include three marinas for berthing private yachts on pontoons, drying harbours and facilities for commercial shipping including roll-on/roll-off ferry berths, a tanker berth and a dock for lift-on/lift-off cargo ships.

== Etymology ==
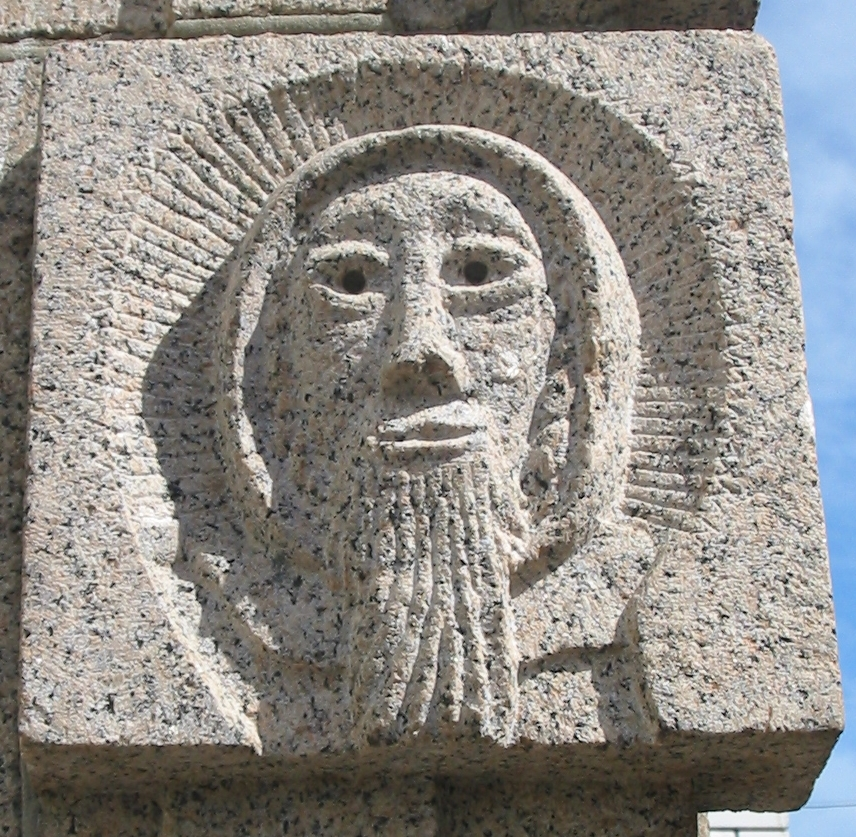
The face of St Helier as sculpted on the 1978 monument La Croix de la Reine in St Helier.

Saint Helier Harbour is named after Helier (or Helerius), a 6th-century ascetic hermit from Belgium. The traditional date of his martyrdom is AD 555. His feast day, marked by an annual municipal and ecumenical pilgrimage to the Hermitage, is on 16 July.

The medieval hagiographies of Helier, the patron saint martyred in Jersey and after whom the parish and town are named, suggest a picture of a small fishing village on the dunes between the marshy land behind and the high-water mark.

An Abbey of Saint Helier was founded in 1155 on L'Islet, a tidal island adjacent to the Hermitage. Closed at the Reformation, the site of the abbey was fortified to create the castle that replaced Mont Orgueil as the island's major fortress. The new Elizabeth Castle was named after the Queen by the Governor of Jersey 1600–1603, Sir Walter Raleigh.

== History ==
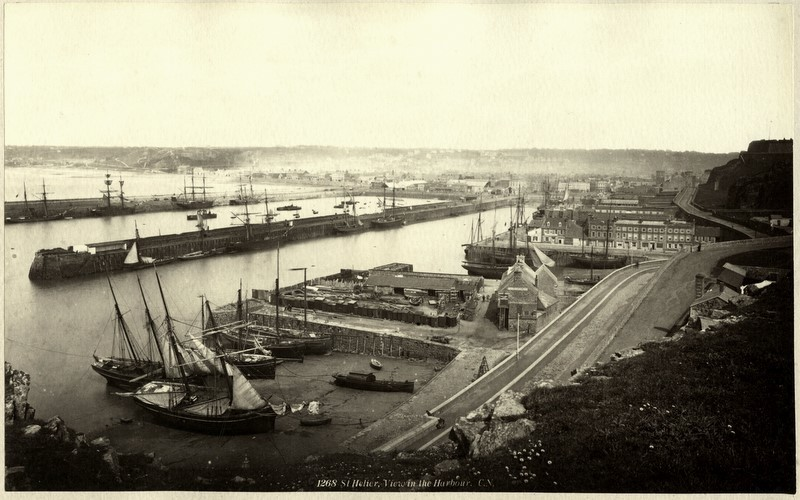
Saint Helier Harbour in the 19th Century

The harbour was constructed in the early 19th century. Previously, ships coming into the town had only a small jetty at the site now called the English Harbour and the French Harbour. The Chamber of Commerce urged the States Assembly to build a new harbour, but they refused, so the Chamber took it into their own hands and paid to upgrade the harbour in 1790. A new breakwater was constructed to shelter the jetty and harbours. In 1814, the merchants constructed the roads now known as Commercial Buildings and Le Quai des Marchands to connect the harbours to the town and in 1832 construction was finished on the Esplanade and its sea wall. A rapid expansion in shipping led the States of Jersey in 1837 to order the construction of two new piers: the Victoria and Albert Piers.

== Main harbour ==
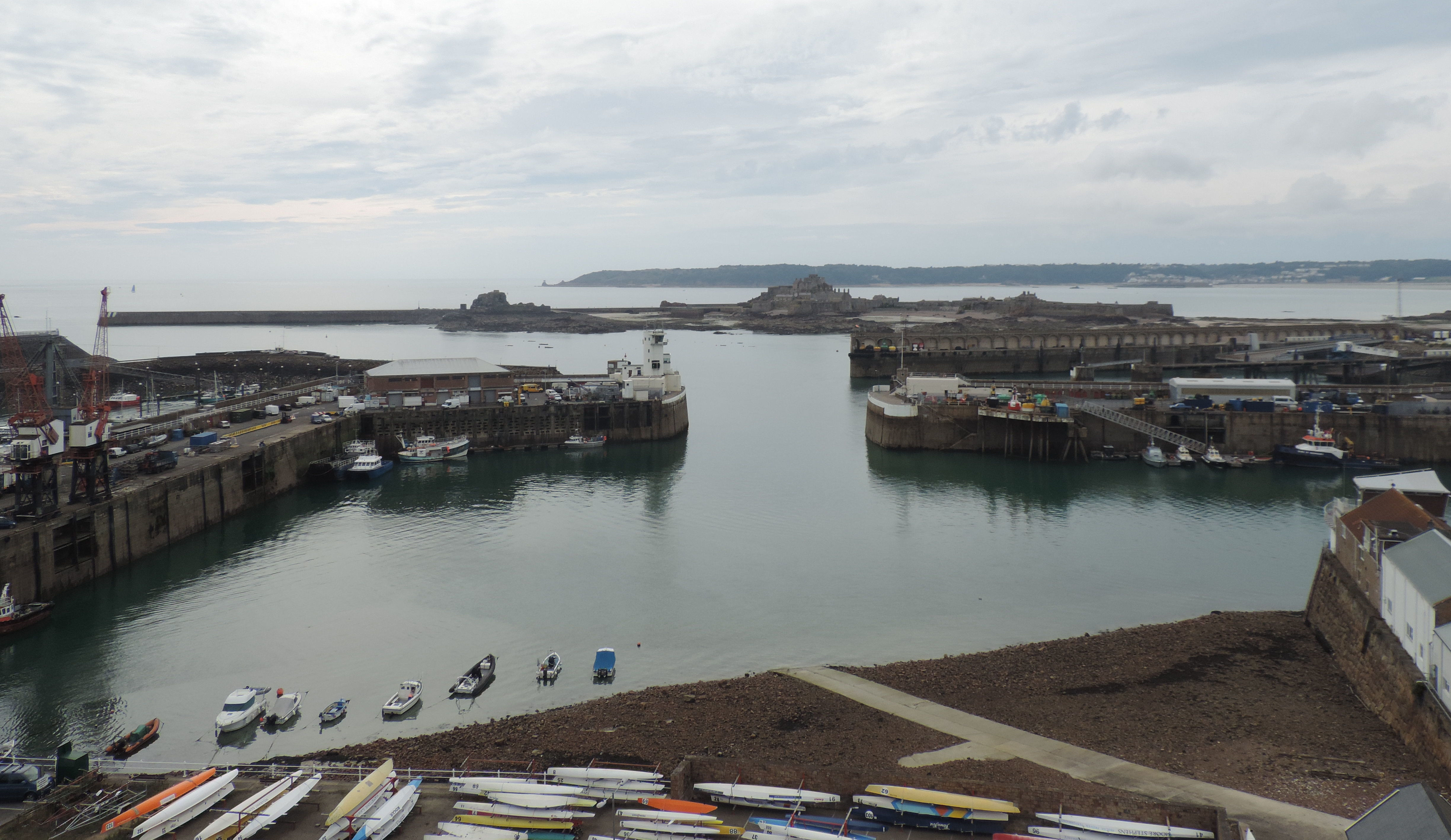
The entrance to Saint Helier Harbour

The main harbour provides deep water berths for commercial vessels alongside the Victoria Quay and New North Quay.

== Elizabeth Harbour ==
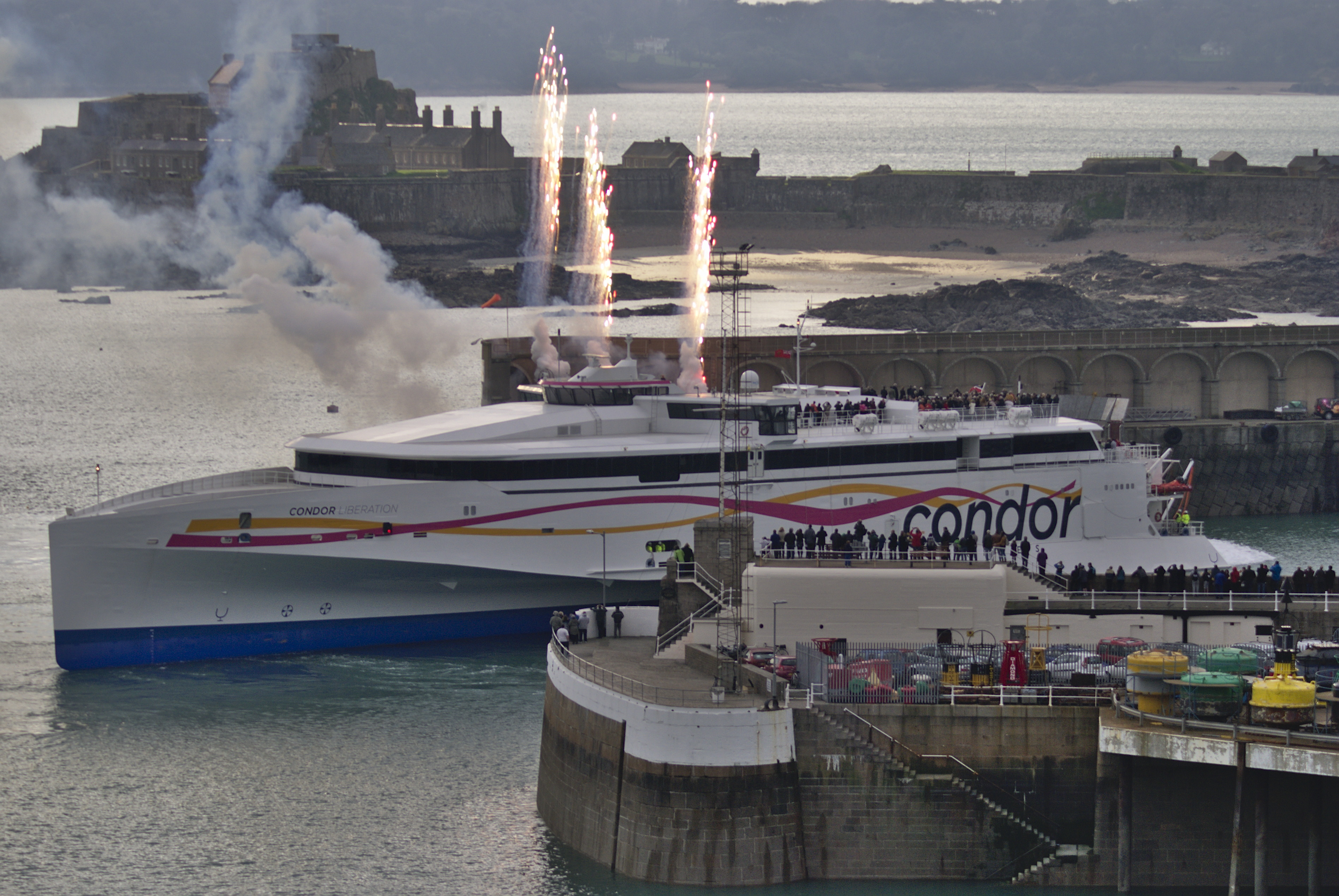
The HSC Condor Liberation manoeuvring into the Elizabeth Harbour on her maiden voyage

The Elizabeth Harbour consists of a ferry terminal, two roll-on/roll-off ferry berths and a trailer park for shipping containers. These are used by high-speed craft to Poole, Guernsey and Saint-Malo, traditional ferries to Saint-Malo and Portsmouth, and foot passenger ferries to Guernsey, Granville, Barneville-Carteret and Sark.

=== Routes ===
Destination	Ferry Operator	Average Duration of Crossing	Frequency	Vessel	Vessel type
St Peter Port, Guernsey	Brittany Ferries	1hr	One crossing per week	Voyager	High-speed passenger and vehicle
St Peter Port, Guernsey	Islands Unlimited	1hr 10mins	Up to two crossings per day (seasonal)	San Pawl	High-speed passenger only
St Peter Port, Guernsey	Manche-Îles Express	1hr 20mins	Appx. four crossings per month (seasonal)	Granville	High-speed passenger only
Sark, Guernsey	Manche-Îles Express	1hr 10mins	Up to three crossings per week (seasonal)	Granville	High-speed passenger only
Poole, UK	DFDS Seaways	4hrs 30mins	Up to five times per week (seasonal)	Levante Jet	High-speed passenger and vehicle
Portsmouth, UK	DFDS Seaways	8hrs to 12hrs (dependant on tidal rotation)	Six crossings per week (passenger and freight)	Corbière Seaways	Conventional passenger, vehicle and freight
Portsmouth, UK	DFDS Seaways	8hrs to 12hrs (dependant on tidal rotation)	Six crossings per week (freight only)	Caesarea Trader	Conventional freight only
St Malo, France	DFDS Seaways	1hr 55mins	Up to two crossings per day	Tarifa Jet	High-speed passenger and vehicle
St Malo, France	DFDS Seaways	4hrs to 6hrs (dependant on tidal rotation)	One crossing per week	Caesarea Trader	Conventional freight only
Granville, France	Manche-Îles Express	1hr 25mins	Up to five crossings per week (seasonal)	Granville	High-speed passenger only
Barneville-Carteret, France	Manche-Îles Express	1hr 5mins	Up to three crossings per week (seasonal)	Granville	High-speed passenger only

== Marinas ==
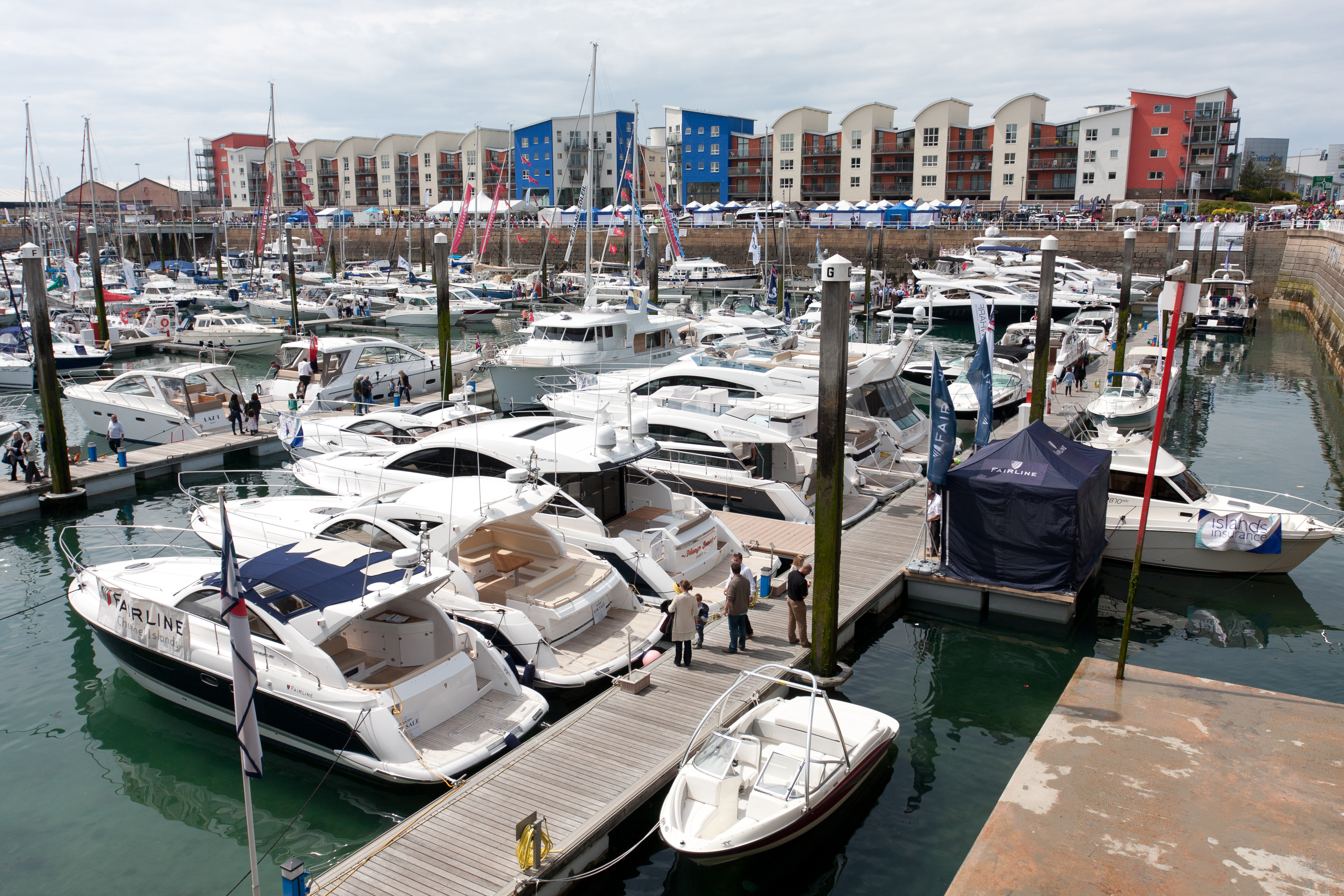
The Jersey Boat Show, an annual event in and around Saint Helier Marina

There are three marinas — the La Collette Yacht Basin, the Saint Helier Marina (built in 1980) and the Elizabeth Marina. The La Collette Yacht Basin is the only one of these to provide non-tidal, 24-hour access to the sea and is home to Jersey's commercial fishing fleet.

Since 2008, Saint Helier Marina has been the venue for the annual Jersey Boat Show.

== Old harbours ==
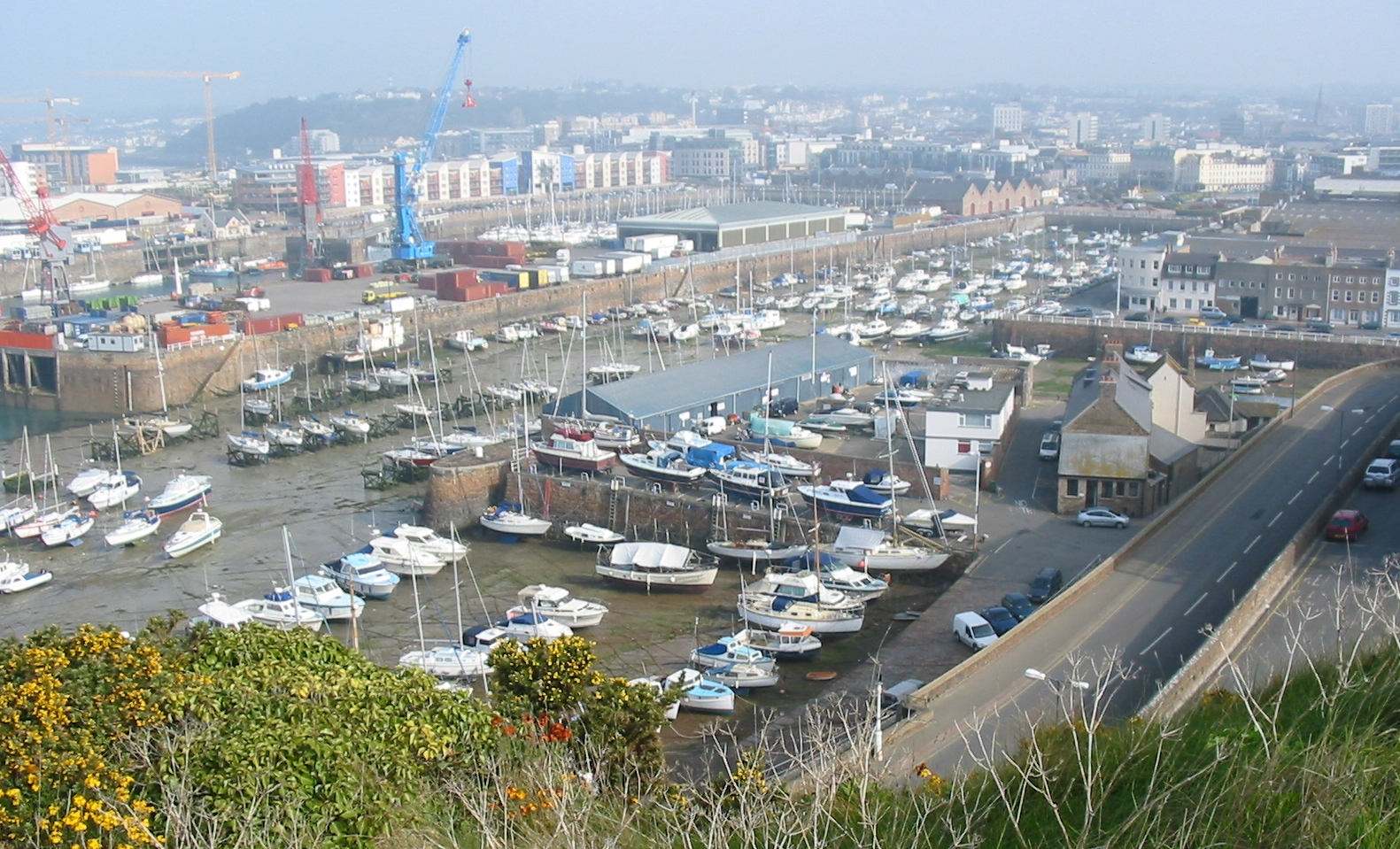
The Old Harbour, English Harbour and French Harbour at low tide, seen from Mount Bingham

The Old Harbour, English Harbour and French Harbour have berths for over 500 motorboats and sailing yachts which dry out on the mud at low tide.

== See also ==
- Condor Ferries
- DFDS Seaways
- Jersey Airport
- Jersey Coastguard
- Jersey Maritime Museum
- Maritime history of the Channel Islands
- Transport in Jersey
