= 2022 St Helier explosion =

Explosion of a housing block in Jersey

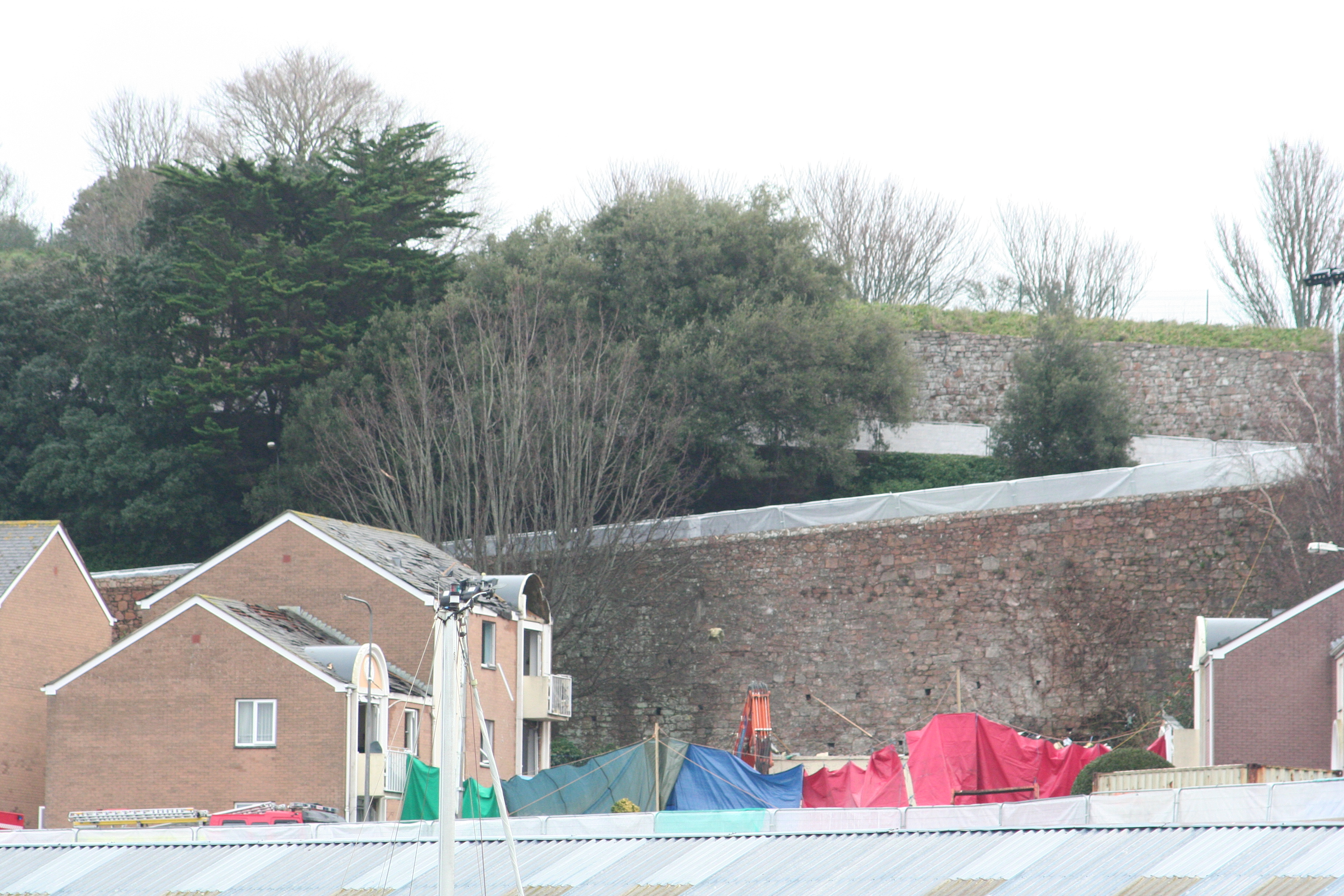
- The site of the explosion
- Date: 10 December 2022
- Time: 3:53 a.m. (GMT (UTC±0))
- Location: Pier Road, St Helier, Jersey; 49°10′42″N 02°06′30″W
- Type: Gas explosion (suspected)
- Deaths: 10
- Injuries: 2
- Accused: Neil Armstrong; Lee Ward; John Wright
- Charges: Gross negligence manslaughter (10 counts each)
- Trial: Initial appearance in Jersey's Magistrate's Court on 14 March 2025

On 10 December 2022, an explosion destroyed a block of flats in St Helier, Jersey in the Channel Islands. Ten people were killed in the suspected gas explosion, which occurred just before 4 a.m. GMT.

The incident happened less than 48 hours after another multiple fatality in Jersey when a freight ship collided with and sank a local trawler off the island's west coast with three lives lost.

== Background ==
The explosion occurred in a three-storey block of flats on Pier Road, which is located on the eastern shore of St Helier's harbour on the south side of the town. The building involved was a social housing block known as Haut de Mont (transl. Top of the Mount), owned by the Jersey government-owned housing company Andium Homes.

== Explosion ==
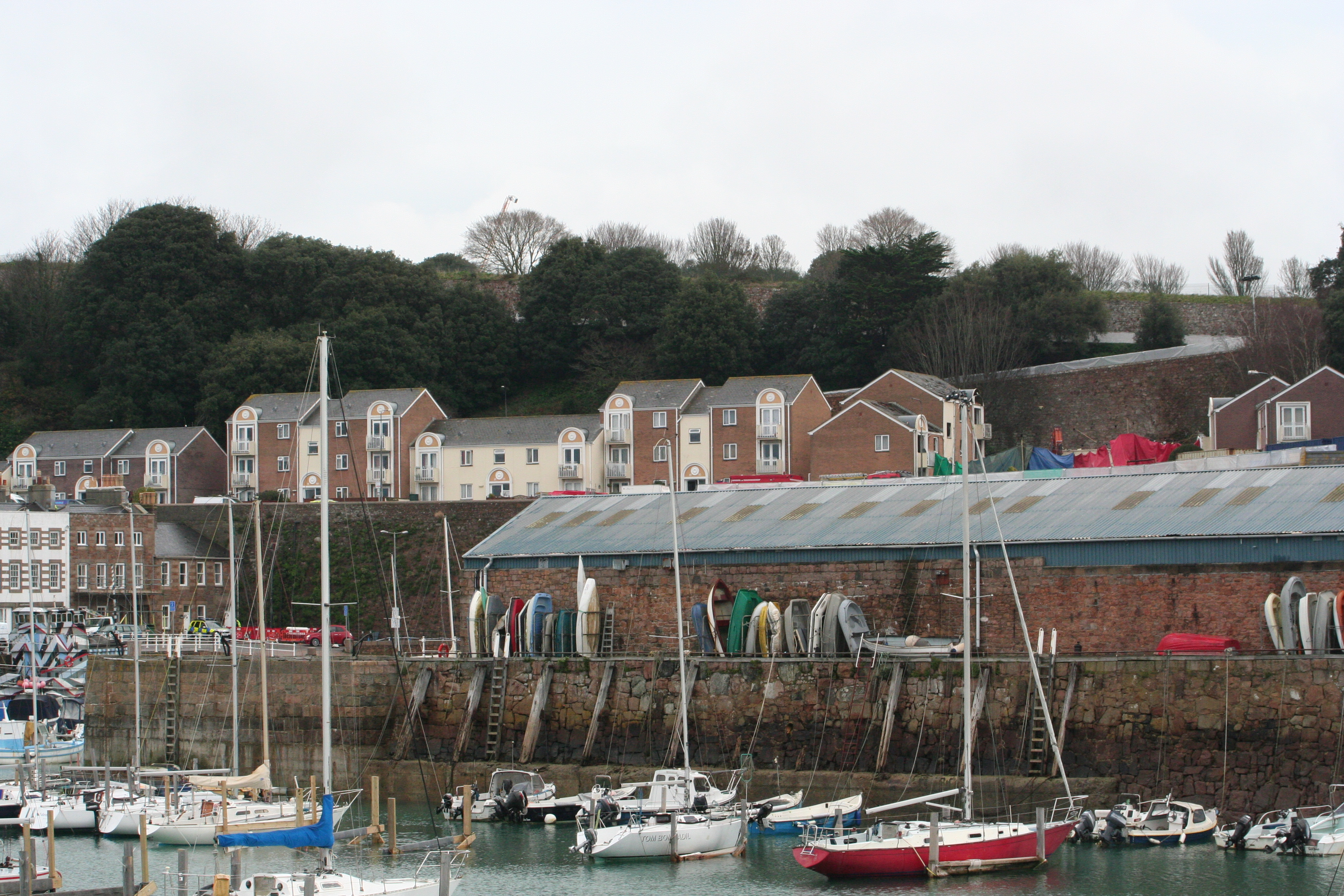
The explosion destroyed a block in a public housing development overlooking St Helier Harbour

At 3:53 a.m. GMT on 10 December 2022, a suspected gas explosion occurred at 27-32 Haut du Mont, a three-storey block of flats on Pier Road in St Helier, Jersey. The explosion, which was caught on CCTV camera caused the building to pancake-collapse, completely destroying it. It was loud enough to be heard across the island, waking up local residents across St Helier who described it as feeling like an earthquake. The explosion caused a fire which sent a plume of smoke billowing across the town's harbour. The fire caused by the explosion was quickly extinguished by the Jersey Fire and Rescue Service, and specialist resources were deployed to stabilise the scene and attempt to reach any possible survivors in the rubble.

More than 50 emergency services personnel were deployed to the scene of the explosion. The surrounding area on Mount Bingham, including Pier Road and South Hill, was cordoned off. Debris from the explosion, including rocks and glass, was thrown over roads and pavements across a wide area. Buildings in the surrounding streets suffered shattered windows, and buildings in the commercial district at the adjacent harbour were damaged. The emergency department at Jersey General Hospital declared a major incident and was closed to new arrivals following the explosion, and routine hospital wards were temporarily closed to visitors.

A specialist hazardous area response team and an urban search and rescue team from Hampshire and Isle of Wight Fire and Rescue Service were flown to the Island to assist in the search and rescue. Equipment and personnel were flown to the island by UK Coastguard and Royal Air Force helicopters. Crews, including a sniffer dog, worked through the night trying to locate survivors.

== Victims ==
After 24 hours, known casualties were three dead and two injured. It was later confirmed another person was injured, bringing the total to three. The number of confirmed dead rose to five late on 11 December, with a further four still missing.

On 11 December, Jersey police ceased search and rescue efforts, with the remaining missing presumed dead. On 12 December, seven missing people, believed victims of the incident were named by Jersey Police. Two people were still believed to be missing.

On 13 December, the names of two further missing people were released. On 14 December, the number of confirmed deaths increased to eight, with one missing person. On 15 December, the final missing resident was found dead. On 25 December there was a tenth fatality when a woman living at 35 Haut de Mont, a neighbouring flat who had been injured by the blast died in hospital.

All of the victims were in their sixties and seventies.

== Investigation ==
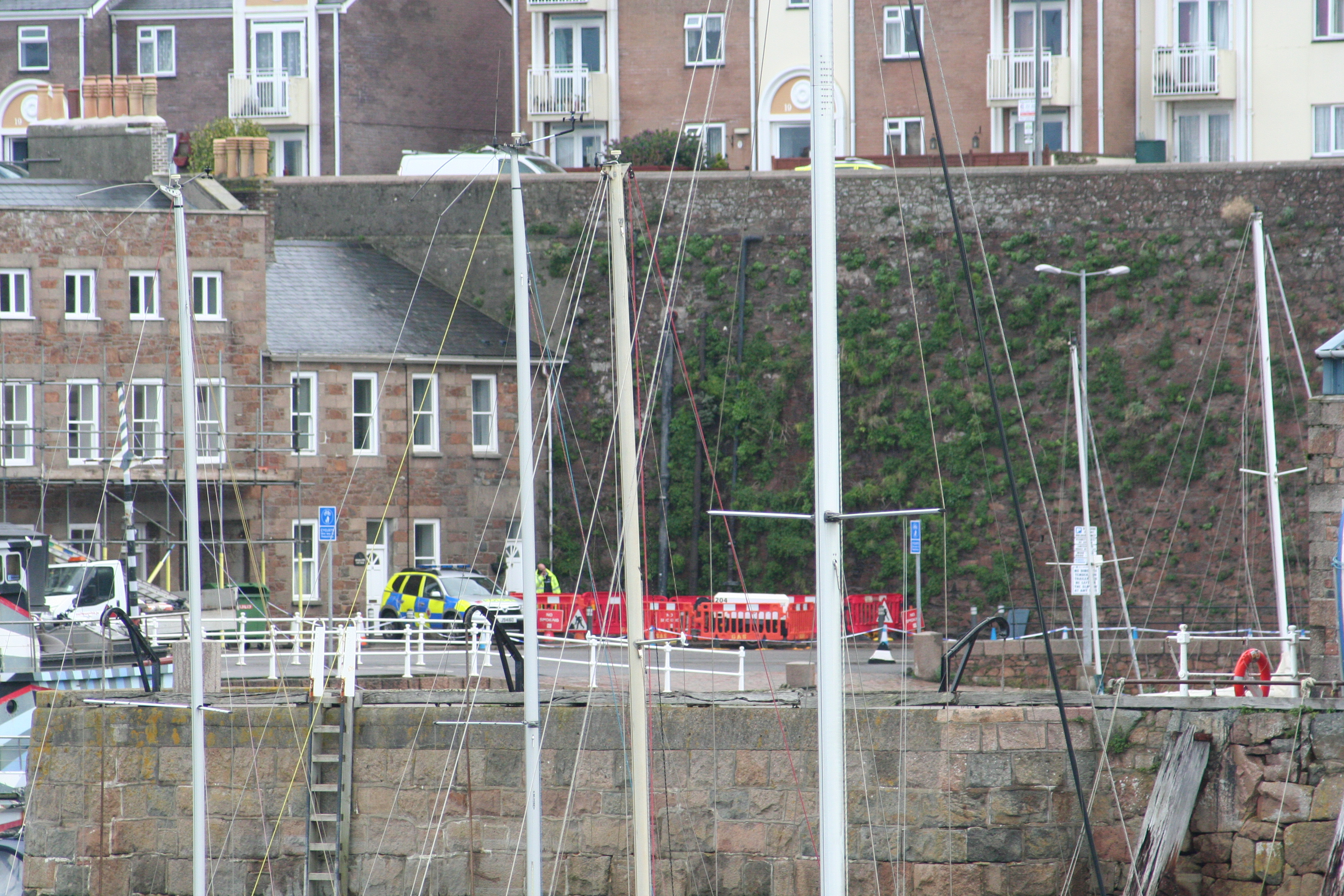
A police officer stands guard at the Jersey gas pipework trench site, with the blast site in the road just above

The chief of the States of Jersey Police, Robin Smith, confirmed that the Jersey Fire and Rescue Service had been called at 20:36 on the evening prior to the explosion and attended the area after reports of a smell of gas. They had left the scene at 21:01 after handing over to Island Energy, the gas network operator in Jersey, Guernsey and the Isle of Man, in accordance with their standard operating procedure. The company launched its own immediate investigation into the explosion alongside, but independent of the official investigation launched by Jersey's authorities.

According to Andium Homes, owner of the block, there had been no mains gas supply at the block. The company's chief executive said that "There was a redundant Island Energy supply at Haut du Mont but as Island Energy have confirmed, no gas was being consumed on site either by us or our residents". In September 2022, Andium asked Island Energy to disconnect the redundant supply from the mains network after the last tenant in a different apartment block in the Haut du Mont development switched to an electric cooker. A trench where gas engineers had been working before the incident in the street below Haut du Mont was subject to a police cordon but Smith said this was not part of the investigation.

Smith advised it may be a criminal investigation or a joint investigation. The site is being treated as a crime scene. Jersey Detective Superintendent Alison Fossey was appointed to head the police investigation, but under mutual aid arrangements, 26 specialist investigators from the United Kingdom including a fire and explosives expert, gas and structural expert and an archaeologist from the National Crime Agency were brought in to assist in the investigation, which is expected to take months. Fifteen more investigators were due to arrive on 18 December, bringing the total number of specialists to 48. A further 25 detectives were working full time on interviewing people.

On 30 December the Deputy Viscount in his role as the island's coroner opened the inquest into the 10 deaths.

The police reported in August, nine months after the explosion, that there were 21 officers working full time on the investigation, 708 statements had been taken and 1,307 lines of enquiry had been pursued as part of Operation Spire.

In an update to the media on 14 November 2023, Smith said that forensic tests by the UK Health and Safety Executive were underway as part of Operation Spire, a joint criminal investigation between the States of Jersey Police and Jersey's Health and Safety Inspectorate (HSI) which was considering whether Jersey's Health and Safety at Work law had been broken.

Three men were arrested between 16 and 17 August 2023 in connection with the explosion and released on bail. In February 2025, the three, all former Island Energy workers, were each charged with ten counts of gross negligence manslaughter. They appeared in Jersey's Magistrate's Court on 14 March 2025.

== Aftermath ==
Up to 40 people were evacuated from the area and given refuge at St Helier Town Hall following the explosion. Two people suffered minor injuries and were described as "walking wounded", undergoing treatment at the Town Hall before being eventually hospitalised and released later the same day. An adjacent block of flats was at risk of collapse due to explosion damage and had to be made safe by local contractors. Fort Regent, the site of Jersey's COVID-19 vaccination centre, was closed following the explosion due to its proximity.

The government of Jersey repurposed the island's COVID-19 helpline as a support line to provide information regarding the explosion in its aftermath.

Forty-two residents of the area were displaced, with most having been found alternative housing. They may not be able to return to their homes before Christmas 2022.

== Response ==
The Chief Minister of Jersey, Kristina Moore, praised the island's "amazing strength" in coming together after a difficult week for Jersey, as a result of the explosion and a fishing trawler going missing with three people on board in the previous few days after colliding with the Commodore Goodwill ferry. A minute's silence was held at football and sports games in Jersey and a candlelit vigil took place at the Town Church.

On 11 December, Timothy Le Cocq, the Bailiff of Jersey, announced that flags would be flown at half-mast until 23 December "as a sign of respect following the two tragic accidents" and that there would be a one-minute's silence at 11 a.m. on Monday 11 December. He also announced a fundraising appeal to support those affected by the incidents.

In a letter to the Lieutenant Governor of Jersey, King Charles III wrote that he and his wife were "dreadfully shocked and saddened" by the two tragedies affecting the island, and offered his deepest sympathy and condolences to all islanders affected by the "heart-breaking" events.

== See also ==
- 2012 Jersey gas holder fire
- Creeslough explosion, a suspected gas explosion in County Donegal, Ireland, two months earlier
