= Jersey Coastguard =

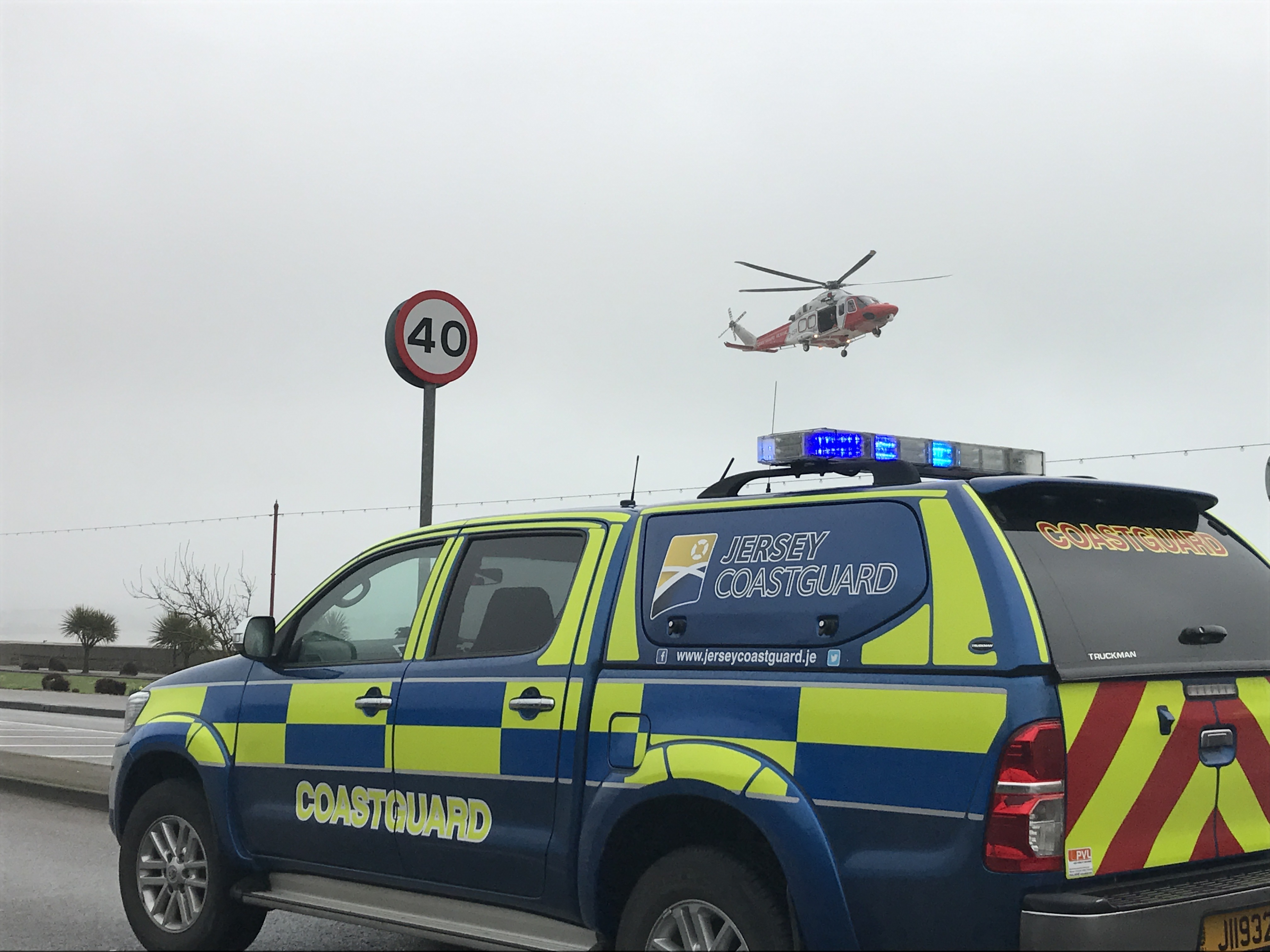
Jersey Coastguard duty officer supervising a UK helicopter landing on main road in St Helier.

Jersey Coastguard is responsible for the safety of life at sea along with the security and protection of the maritime environment for Jersey’s territorial waters. The service is provided by the Ports of Jersey from the Maritime Operations Centre in Maritime House in the port of St Helier, Jersey.

== Search and Rescue (SAR) ==
Jersey Coastguard is a tier-one emergency service on the island of Jersey. People who dial 999 and ask for the Coastguard or call up on VHF marine radio channel 16 or 82 will speak directly with the team, which is available 24/7, to coordinate their rescue. They work closely with adjacent services, including Guernsey Coastguard, CROSS Jobourg, CROSS Corsen, and HM Coastguard in the UK.

If there is an incident at sea, there are several assets available in the island. Two lifeboat charities operate in Jersey. The RNLI operates three lifeboats, and The Jersey Lifeboat Association currently have two. Jersey Fire and Rescue Service have two inshore boats (Fire Alpha & Fire Bravo) that can be deployed at various locations around the coast. Ports of Jersey Marine Services have many vessels that can be readily called upon with a crew on standby 24/7. There are additional lifeboats in Guernsey and around the French coast which will also assist if required, as can a number of air assets, including Channel Island Air Search in Guernsey and several military and civilian search and rescue helicopters in France and the UK.

There are 124 life rings around the coast provided and maintained by Jersey Coastguard for those in difficulty inshore. The beaches of St Brelade, St Ouen, Portelet and Greve de Lecq have RNLI beach lifeguards that operate in the primary season. The bathing pool at Havre de Pas also has lifeguards on duty in summer months provided by the Jersey Government.

Core maritime rescue assets available to Jersey Coastguard
Type	Name / call sign / tail number	VHF radio 'name'	Location	Operated by
Ex Tyne-class lifeboat	Sir Max Aitken III	Jersey Lifeboat	St Helier	Jersey Lifeboat Association
Gemini inshore Rescue RIB	Albert Pinel	Albert Pinel	St Helier	Jersey Lifeboat Association
Tamar-class lifeboat	George Sulivan	St Helier Lifeboat	St Helier	RNLI
Atlantic 85 inshore lifeboat	Spirit of St Helier	St Helier ILB	St Helier	RNLI
Atlantic 85 inshore lifeboat	Eric W. Wilson	St Catherine's Lifeboat	St Catherine	RNLI
D class inshore rescue craft	Fire Alpha Marine	Fire Alpha Marine	St Helier Fire Station	Jersey Fire and Rescue Service
D class inshore rescue craft	Fire Bravo Marine	Fire Bravo Marine	Red Houses Fire Station	Jersey Fire and Rescue Service
Damen Shoalbuster tug	MHZS8	Duke of Normandy	St Helier	Ports of Jersey Marine Services
Nelson 44 pilot cutter	MAMW8	Rival	St Helier	Ports of Jersey Marine Services
Nelson 38 pilot cutter	WJG7	Le Fret	St Helier	Ports of Jersey Marine Services
Sims Lepard workboat	ZINL8	Halycon	St Helier	Ports of Jersey Marine Services
Britten Norman Islander	G-CKYC	Air Search One	Guernsey airport	Channel Islands Air Search
Leonardo AW189 helicopter	G-MCGO *	Rescue 175	Lee-on-Solent airport	HM Coastguard
Eurocopter AS365N Dauphin helicopter	Rescue Cyclone Xray	Rescue Cyclone	Cherbourg airport	French Navy
Eurocopter EC145 helicopter	F-ZBPF *	Dragon 50	Bréville-sur-mer, France	Sécurité Civile

* Helicopter tail numbers subject to operational change

== Station ID, channels and frequencies ==
Jersey Coastguard Maritime Mobile Service Identity Number (MMSI) - 002320060

VHF Channels Used by Jersey Coastguard
VHF Channel	Frequencies MHz	Channel Type	Comments	Aerial site
14	156.700	St Helier VTS	Monitored 24/7	St Helier, Gorey
16	156.8	International Distress, Safety and Calling	Monitored 24/7	Fremont, Gorey, St Helier, Five Oaks
82	157.125 161.725	Working Channel	Monitored 24/7	Fremont, Five Oaks
25	157.250 161.850	Broadcasting Channel	Broadcasting navigational and safety information	Fremont, Five Oaks
70	156.525	Digital Select Calling	Monitored 24/7	St Helier, St Ouen

== Routine Broadcasts ==
The following routine broadcasts are made by Jersey Coastguard on VHF Channel 82 & 25 (with a prior announcement on VHF Channel 16) at the following times:

Shipping Forecast (also available on Jersey Coastguard website)

- 0645 UTC
- 0745 UTC
- 0845 UTC
- 1245 UTC
- 1845 UTC
- 2245 UTC

Strong Wind / Gale Warnings

- 0307 UTC
- 0907 UTC
- 1507 UTC
- 2107 UTC

Navigational Warnings

- 0433 UTC
- 0833 UTC
- 1633 UTC
- 2033 UTC

Navigational Warnings and Strong wind warnings are made on receipt and included in the shipping forecast broadcasts.

== Equipment ==
Jersey Coastguard uses the latest technology in their Maritime Operations Centre for routine and SAR working. A coastguard officer has available at their desk a communications screen which has VHF Radio, TETRA (Terrestrial Trunked Radio) and phones integrated into one user friendly screen. They have an electronic radio and incident log. Electronic charting (ECDIS) with AIS (Automatic Identification System) and RADAR overlay, with a direction finder interface displaying the direction of VHF calls on ch16 from the old radio tower at La Corbière. For Search and Rescue planning the latest SARIS software is used allowing the officers to input data relating to an incident which then uses multiple calculations involving wind, tide and drift formulas to predict where a person or object may have drifted to. Jersey Coastguard also has an emergency response vehicle, which is equipped with TETRA and VHF radios.

=== C-SIS Scheme ===
Jersey Coastguard launched the C-SIS Scheme (Coastguard Safety Identification scheme) in 2014 for water craft that do not fall under the category required by the law to be registered. This scheme assists with locating owners of craft if they're lost and come ashore or are found adrift at sea.

=== Education ===
Jersey Coastguard works closely with local primary and secondary schools delivering an education programme on sea safety focusing on beach safety, dangers of rip currents, being stranded by the tide and importantly whom to call in an emergency. These key messages are also promoted at other Island events which Jersey coastguard attends. Jersey Coastguard is also involved with 'advice on board' and lifejacket clinics run in conjunction with the RNLI.

== History and background ==
Jersey is an independent Crown dependency located in the English Channel close to northern France. Jersey’s territorial waters encompass approximately 840 square miles with more than 28 miles of coastline.

In May 2007, Jersey Coastguard was launched from an amalgamation of services provided by Jersey Harbours, primarily the ‘Jersey Radio’ coastal station, for the States Assembly, with official recognition as a Category 1 emergency responder on the Island, along with the Police, Ambulance and the Fire and Rescue Service.

In October 2015 Jersey Harbours and Jersey Airport became incorporated under Ports of Jersey with the primary objective to provide essential public services to the island in a sustainable manner. Jersey Coastguard moved with Jersey Harbours under Ports of Jersey who now provide this service for the Island community.

Between 2002 and 2015 Jersey Coastguard have dealt with between 99 and 175 incidents annually.

== External ==
- Official website
