= 2022 in Jersey =

Events in the year 2022 in Jersey.

== Incumbents ==
- Sovereign: Elizabeth II (until 8 September); Charles III onwards
- Lieutenant governor: Stephen Dalton (until 30 June); Jerry Kyd onwards
- Chief minister: John Le Fondré (until 11 July); Kristina Moore onwards
- Bailiff: Timothy Le Cocq

== Events ==
- Ongoing: COVID-19 pandemic in Jersey
- March: The Better Way 2022 party was formed by a group of independent politicians.
- 22 June: 2022 Jersey general election
- 8 September: Elizabeth II dies at Balmoral Castle, Scotland, Charles III assumed position of Monarch.
- 9 September: As with other locations throughout the Commonwealth, a death gun salute of 96 rounds representing the years of the Queen's life were fired.
- 10 December: 2022 St Helier explosion: Ten people were killed in the suspected gas explosion.
