= Caesarea Trader =

Car ferry

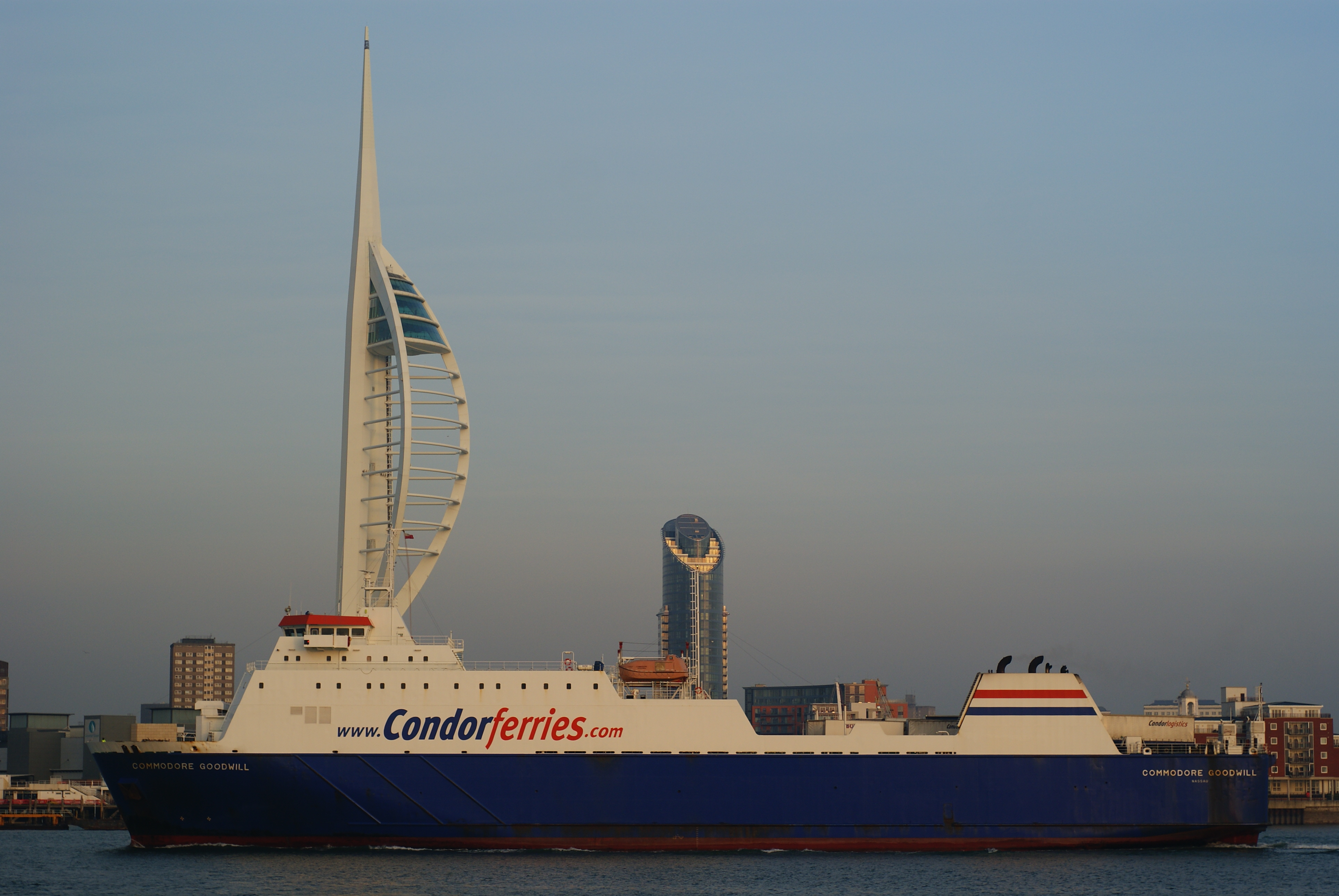
- Commodore Goodwill at Portsmouth in 2010

History
- Name: 1996–2025: Commodore Goodwill; 2025–present: Caesarea Trader
- Owner: 1996–2004: Commodore Shipping; 2004–2025: Condor Ferries; 2025–present: DFDS Seaways
- Operator: 1999–2004: Commodore Shipping; 2004–2025: Condor Ferries; 2025–present: DFDS Seaways
- Builder: Royal Schelde Group, Vlissingen, Netherlands
- Identification: IMO number: 9117985
- Status: In service

General characteristics
- Type: ROPAX ferry

Caesarea Trader is a roll-on/roll-off ferry owned by DFDS Seaways. Launched in 1996, she previously operated between Portsmouth and the Channel Islands with Commodore Shipping and later Condor Ferries as Commodore Goodwill, before being sold to DFDS Seaways in 2025. She carries unaccompanied trailers and commercial cargo as part of the company's dedicated Jersey logistics service to Portsmouth and Saint-Malo.

== History ==
Commodore Goodwill was ordered in December 1994, and her keel was laid on 14 March 1995. She was launched on 6 November 1995 and entered service with Commodore Ferries on 4 March 1996.

== Accidents and incidents ==
On 11 May 2007, HD Ferries' ship HD1 collided with Commodore Goodwill in Jersey harbour.

On 10 December 2007, bad weather caused Commodore Goodwill to strike the entrance to the La Collette yacht basin in Saint Helier Harbour. One of the vessel's propellers was damaged, and she was sent to Falmouth for the damaged part to be removed so that she could return to service as soon as possible in the run-up to Christmas. On 13 December 2007, the Brittany Ferries freight vessel Coutances was chartered to temporarily take her place.

On 8 December 2022, Commodore Goodwill departed Guernsey at 04:41 bound for Jersey when, at around 05:30, she collided with L'Ecume II, an 18-metre (59 ft) fishing trawler. The Jersey-registered trawler sank in 40 metres (130 ft) of water, 5.6 kilometres (3.5 miles) west of St Ouen's bay, with three fishermen on board. The skipper of L'Ecume II, Michael Michieli, and his two Filipino crewmen, Larry Simyunn and Jervis Baligat, were searched for unsuccessfully; by 13 December two bodies had been found and were later brought ashore, with the search continuing. After inspection by divers, Commodore Goodwill was cleared to re-enter service.

An investigation was opened, with a remotely operated underwater vehicle used to survey the shipwreck. As Commodore Goodwill is registered in the Bahamas, the Bahamas Maritime Authority is responsible for conducting a safety-focused investigation. Plans were made to raise the fishing boat from the seabed to assist the investigation, however the skipper's body was recovered from the wreck while it remained on the seabed, and only part of the wreckage was lifted onto land for investigative purposes. The file from the States of Jersey Police investigation, known as Operation Nectar, has been passed to Jersey's Law Officers' Department for review.

On 9 February 2026, a fire took place on the Caesarea Trader off the Isle of Wight, and she had to be towed into Portsmouth the following day. After a period of repair at Lindø, she returned to service at the end of April 2026.
