= Saint Helier Marina =

Coordinates: 49.182106°N 2.1109°W

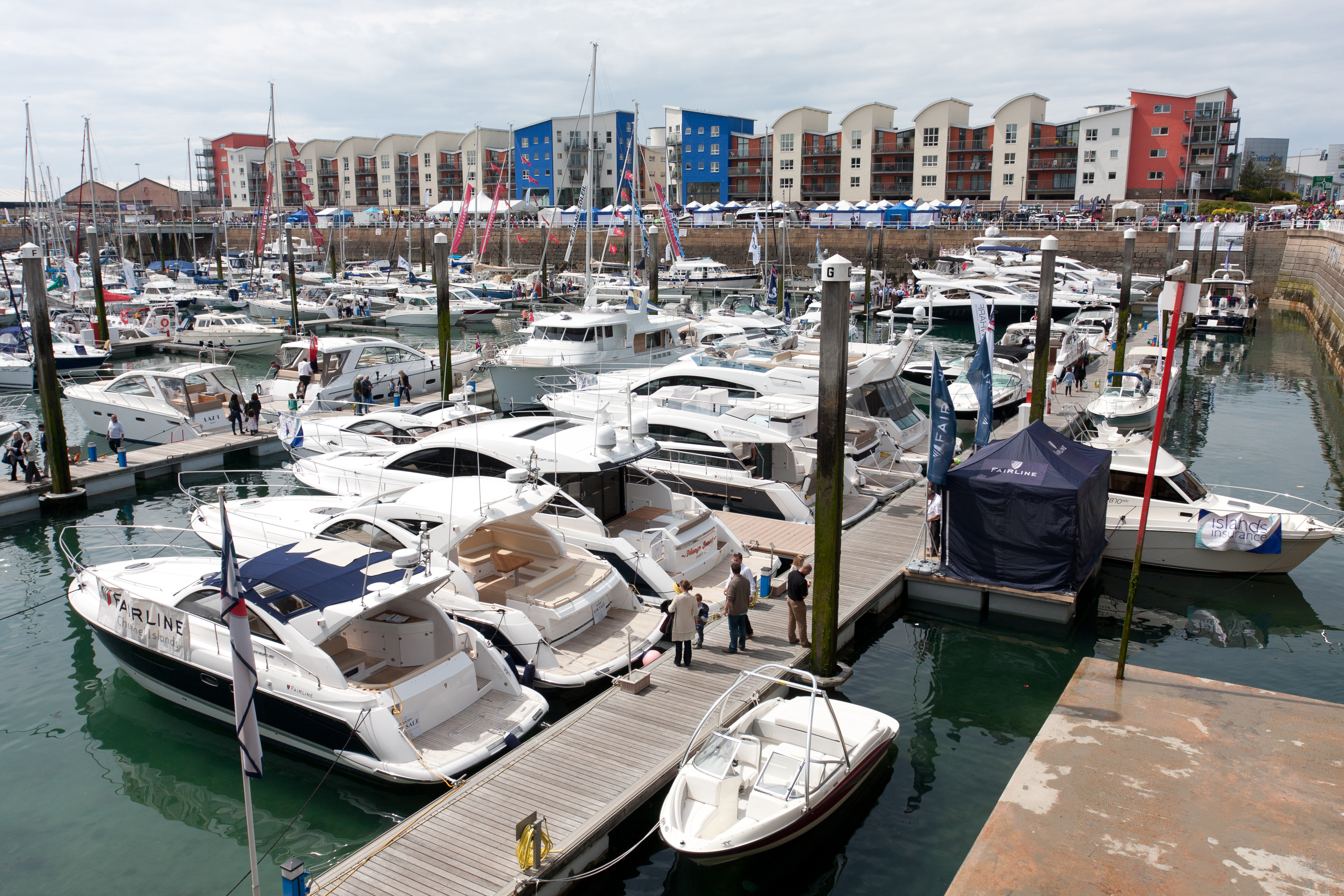
St Helier Marina in 2012.

St Helier Marina is one of three marinas located in Saint Helier Harbour, and is operated by Ports of Jersey.

The marina is mostly used for berthing private yachts using a series of pontoons.

Since 2008, the marina has been the venue for the annual Jersey Boat Show.

== Albert Pier ==
The marina is enclosed on the west-side by the Albert Pier, which was constructed from 1846.

In 2004, the Needle sculpture on the pier, which commemorates the Golden Jubilee of the Queen Elizabeth II, was unveiled by her son Prince Charles during his visit to the island.

== New North Quay ==
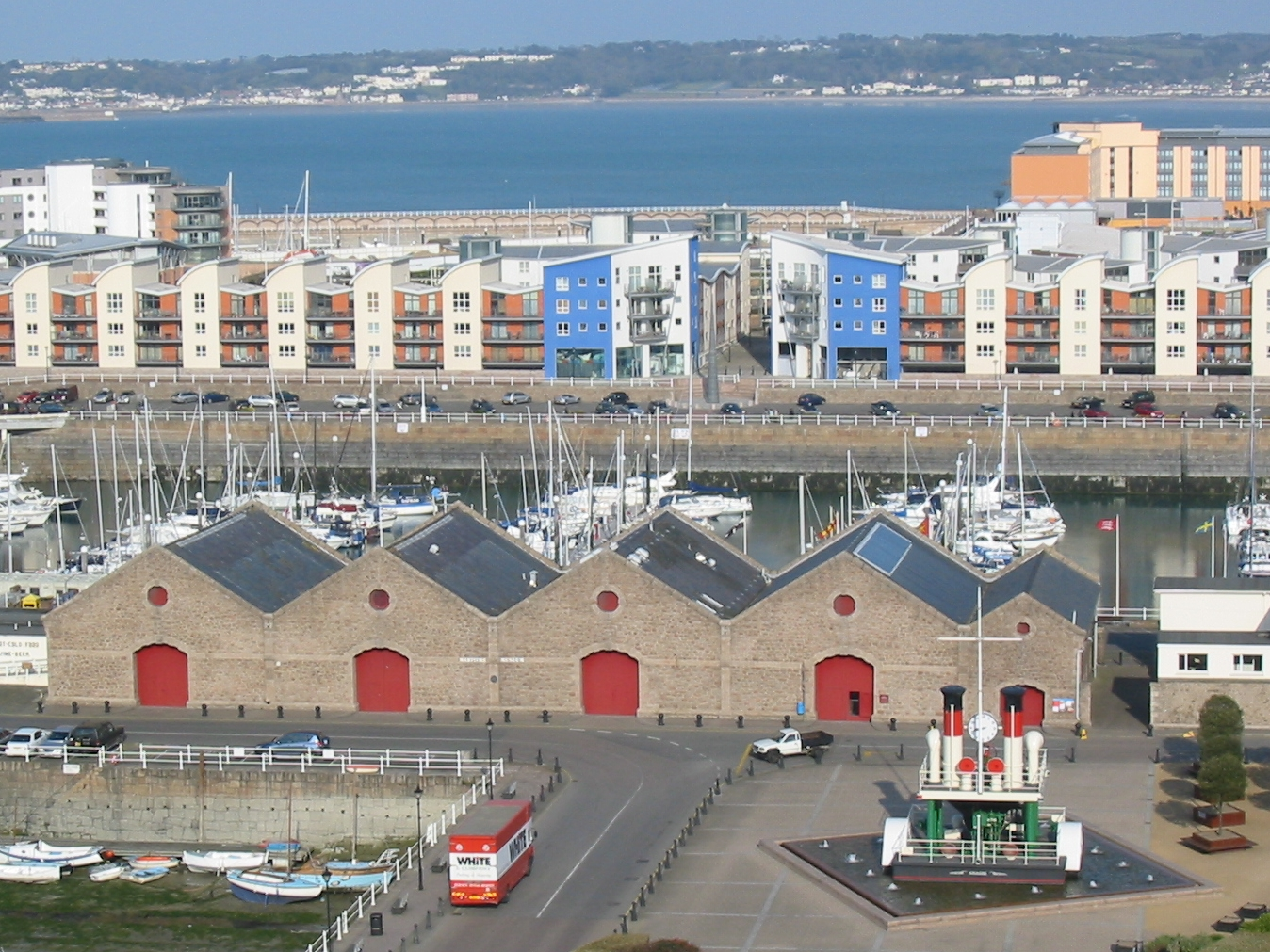
Maritime Museum and St Helier Marina

The New North Quay, and Jersey Maritime Museum are directly to the east of the Marina. Warehousing and cranes are also located on the quay.
