= 2012 Jersey gas holder fire =

2012 fire outbreak at a gas holder in Jersey

- Date: July 4, 2012
- Time: 12:30 pm (BST)
- Location: Tunnell Street, Saint Helier, Jersey.; 49°11′16″N 2°5′52″W
- Deaths: 0
- Injuries: 2
- Missing: 0

On 4 July 2012, fire broke out at a gas holder, owned by Jersey Gas, on Tunnell Street, in Saint Helier, Jersey. The Jersey Fire and Rescue Service brought the fire under control, and it burnt out during the early hours of 5 July. In the aftermath of the incident Jersey Gas was fined £65,000 by the island's Royal Court and ordered to pay legal costs of £11,000.

== Cause ==
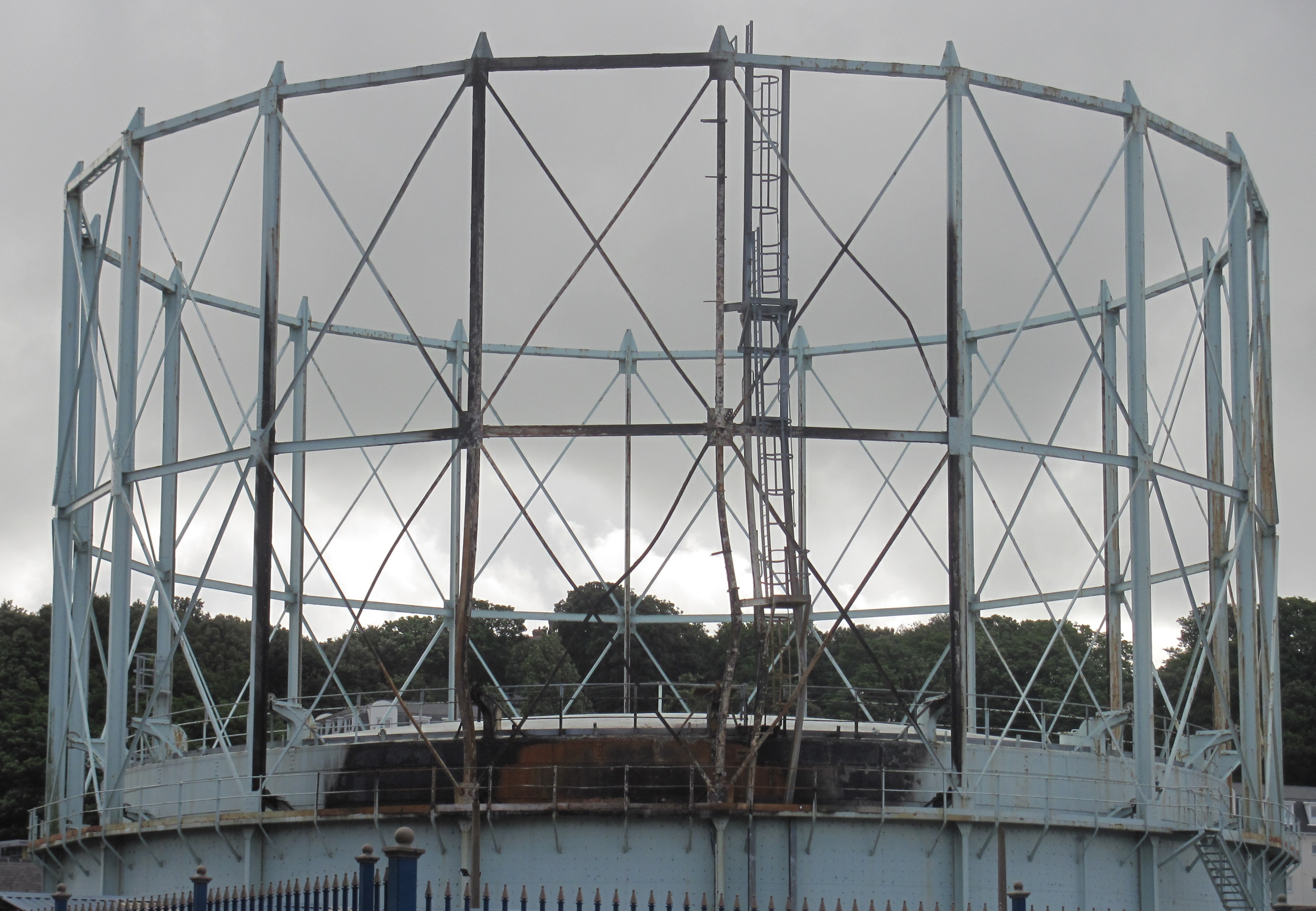
The gas holder as it appeared after the fire

An investigation by the Jersey Fire and Rescue Service conducted shortly after the incident determined the fire started while workers were "repairing a gas leak on the side of the holder", who were using electric tools. During this, the leaking gas ignited. The fire spread and "attacked" the joints of the holder, which caused more gas to leak out and ignite, resulting in a larger and more intense fire. Furthermore, Jersey Gas admitted to not carrying out risk assessments, not providing "a safe system of work" and providing inadequate health and safety training to its employees.

== Evacuation ==
An area of St Helier was evacuated and cordoned off soon after the fire started. Seven nearby schools were also evacuated. Many residents who live in houses surrounding the gas holder were not allowed to return to their homes until the following day, and some sought assistance at the parish hall.

== Injuries ==
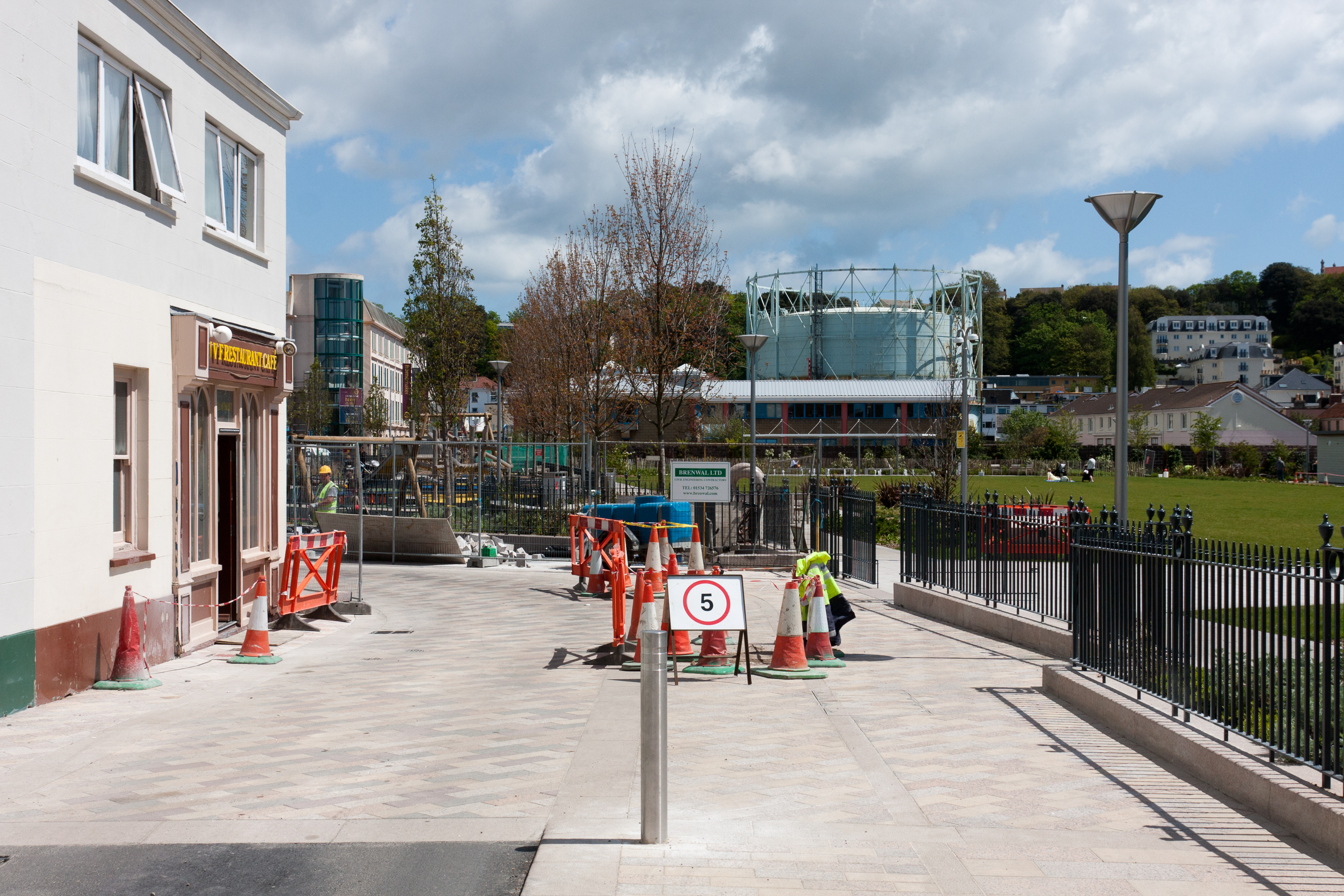
The location of the gas holder as it appeared before the fire

Both employees of Jersey Gas performing the repairs suffered minor burns due to the incident.

== See also ==
- 2022 St Helier explosion
