= Comptroller and Auditor General for Jersey =

Independent public auditor of Jersey

Office overview
- Formed: 2005
- Headquarters: Lincoln Chambers, St Helier, Jersey
- Annual budget: £902,500 (2010)
- Office executive: Lynn Pamment, Comptroller and Auditor General for Jersey
- Website: http://www.jerseyauditoffice.je/

The Comptroller and Auditor General (C&AG) is the independent public auditor of Jersey. The office is supported by the Jersey Audit Office, which was established in 2005. Its remit includes auditing financial statements and examining the use of public funds, including internal financial control, value for money and corporate governance.

== Appointment and independence ==
The office is continued by the Comptroller and Auditor General (Jersey) Law 2014. The C&AG is appointed by the States Assembly on a proposition by the Chief Minister of Jersey and the chair of the Public Accounts Committee, after taking account of the views and recommendations of the Jersey Appointments Commission. The appointment is for a fixed term of seven years and cannot be extended.

The 2014 Law provides that the C&AG may not be directed on how any function of the office is to be carried out, although the C&AG must liaise with and attend meetings of the Public Accounts Committee.

== Functions ==
The C&AG provides independent assurance to the States Assembly that Jersey's public finances and specified public funds are regulated, controlled, supervised and accounted for in accordance with the relevant legislation. The office also reports on corporate governance, internal controls, internal audit, economy, efficiency and effectiveness in the use of resources, and actions needed to bring about improvement.

An example of the C&AG's wider value-for-money work is the 2026 report on the States of Jersey Fire and Rescue Service, which examined how the service used resources to manage risk and deliver an efficient, effective and economic service. The report found that the service had identified a large number of extreme risks associated with operating at current levels, and made recommendations on risk management, strategic planning, performance indicators, use of growth funding and ministerial oversight. The Jersey Evening Post described the audit as finding that the service lacked capacity and capability to deliver its legal duties safely, while the Minister for Justice and Home Affairs said the department welcomed the audit and would make a formal response.

The C&AG is responsible for ensuring that the annual financial statement of the States is audited, and may report on independently audited States bodies and States-aided independent bodies.

Reports made by the C&AG are provided to the Greffier of the States and laid before the States. If the C&AG suspects criminal activity while carrying out an audit or report, the matter must be reported to the Attorney General of Jersey.

In her 2025 Annual Report of Findings, Lynn Pamment reported that 98 C&AG recommendations remained open at 31 December 2025, including some dating from a report published in 2014, and said there was scope for the Government to implement recommendations more fully and promptly.

== Office holders ==
Office holder	Years
Christopher Swinson OBE	2005–2012
Vacant	2012–2013
Karen McConnell	2013–2019
Lynn Pamment CBE	2020–2026
Paul Dossett	2027–2033

Christopher Swinson resigned in June 2012, after reporting on the failed proposed acquisition of Lime Grove House as a headquarters for the States of Jersey Police.In September 2012, the States Assembly rejected a proposition calling for an inquiry into the circumstances of his resignation.

== See also ==
Government of Jersey

States Assembly

Public Accounts Committee (Jersey)

Comptroller and Auditor General
