= Jersey Boat Show =

Maritime event held in the Channel Islands

- Genre: Boat Show and Watersports Lifestyle Show
- Venue: St. Helier Harbour
- Locations: Saint Helier Marina, Jersey
- Inaugurated: May 2008
- Attendance: ▲30,000 (2011)
- Organizer: Ports of Jersey
- Website: www.jerseyboatshow.com

The Barclays Jersey Boat Show is the largest maritime event, as well as the largest free event held in the Channel Islands, and is organised by Ports of Jersey. The first event was held in May 2008, with the 2017 edition celebrating the shows 10th anniversary. The 13th Barclays Jersey Boat Show was scheduled to take place on the Spring Bank Holiday weekend from Saturday 4 to Monday 6 May 2020 but was canceled, together with the 2021 edition, due to the COVID-19 pandemic in Jersey. The show takes place in and around St Helier Marina and the waterfront of St Helier in Jersey.

It is a free-entry public event, and includes catering areas, lifestyle stalls, stage entertainment and on-water shows, as well as boat exhibits.

Since its second edition, the show has been sponsored by Barclays, and has become known as the Barclays Jersey Boat Show.

== History ==
=== 2008–2011 ===
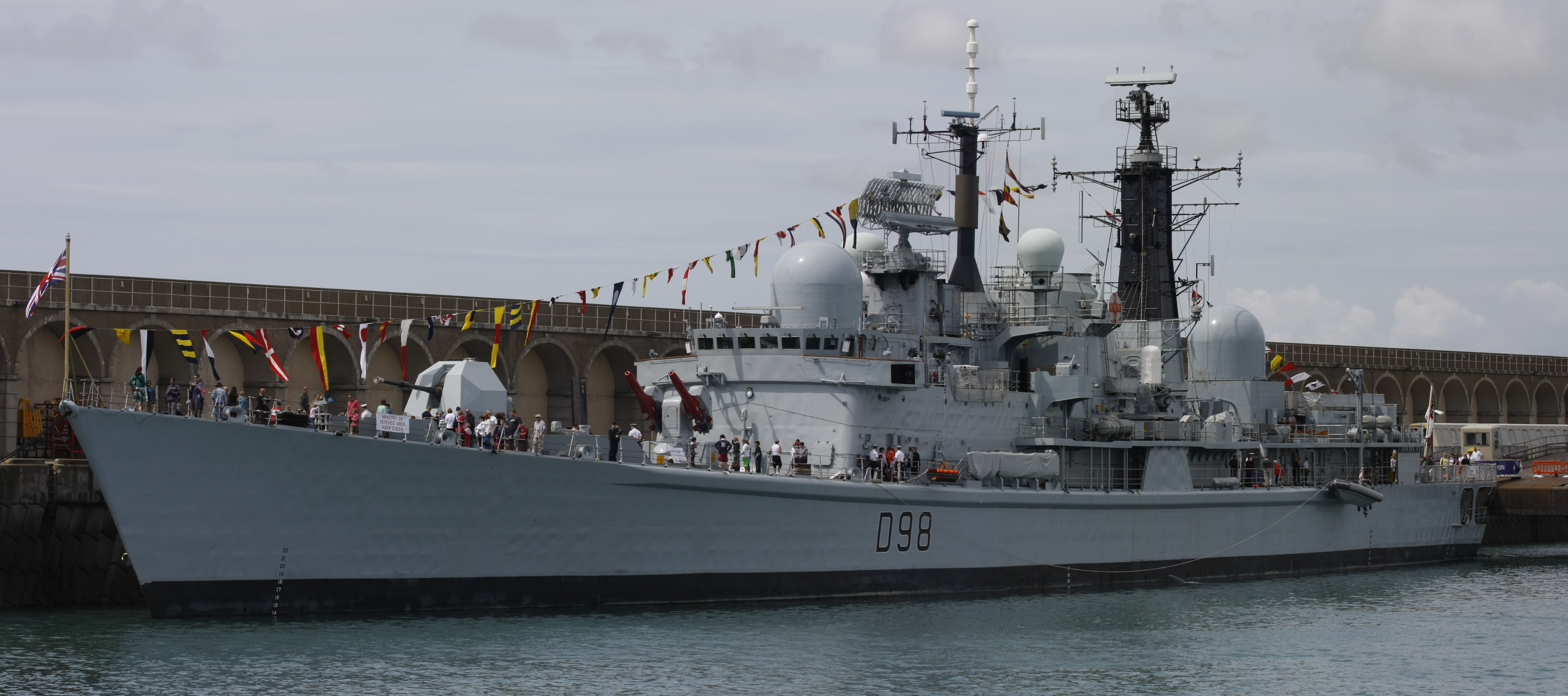
HMS York at the 2009 show.

The show is normally attended by a visiting Royal Navy ship and other assets, in 2008, this was HMS Kent. In 2009, HMS York (D98) was the visiting ship, HMS Mersey attended in 2010, 2012 and 2013, and her sister ship HMS Severn in 2011. 2014 and 2016. In 2015 HMS Tyne attended.

=== 2017 ===
It was estimated that in excess of 30,000 people attended in 2017, the number has been growing year on year. HMS Mersey was due to attend the show but was called away at the last minute for operational duties.

Exhibitions and displays

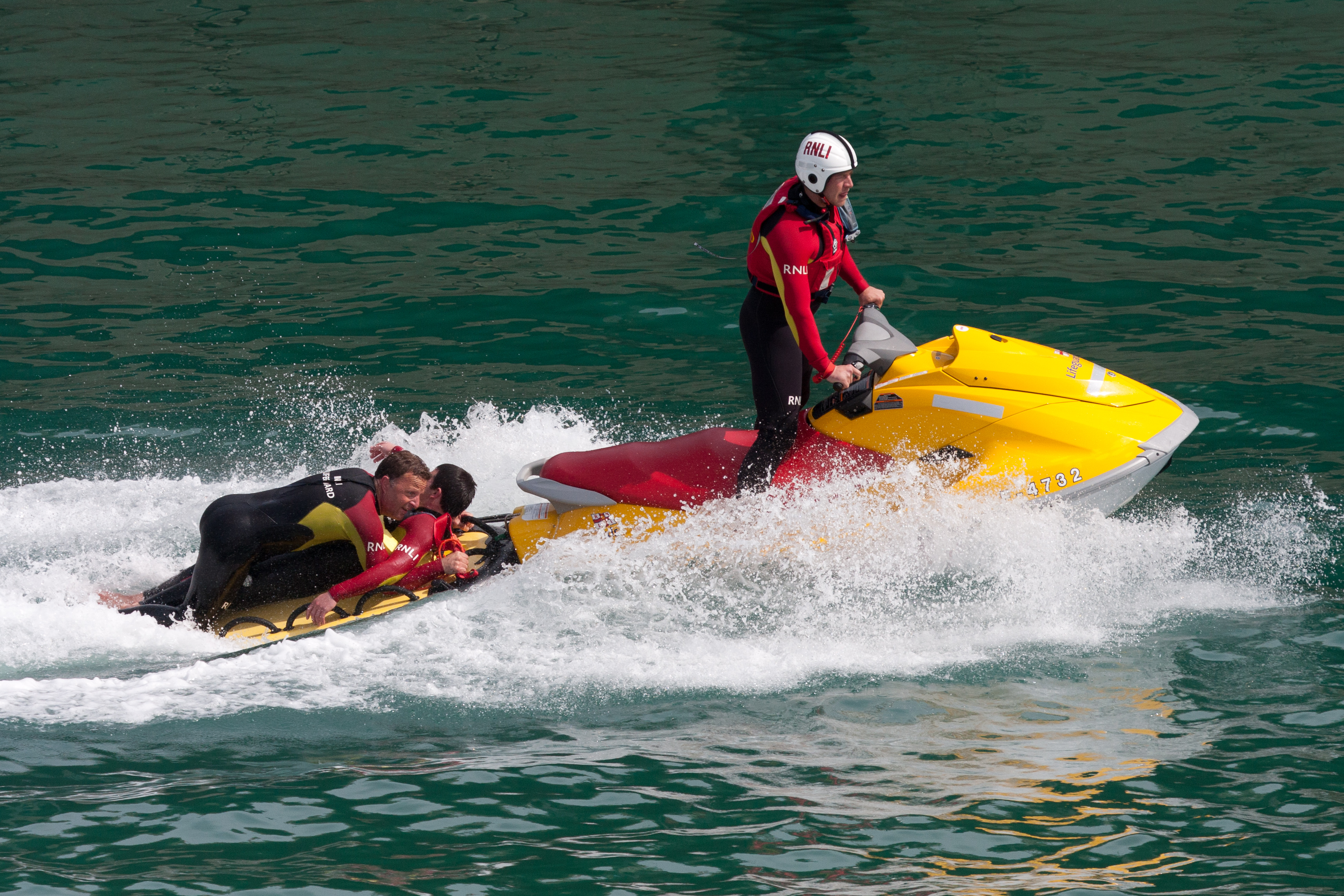
RNLI lifeguards at the 2012 show.

The exhibitors at the show consist of yacht and watercraft manufacturers, chandlers, boat owners, lifestyle stalls and catering stalls.
