= Jersey Fire and Rescue Service =

Fire and rescue service for the island of Jersey

Operational area
- Country: Jersey

Agency overview
- Chief Fire Officer: Paul Brown

Facilities and equipment
- Stations: 2

Website
- jerseyfire.je

The States of Jersey Fire and Rescue Service is the statutory fire and rescue service which deals with a broad range of incidents on the island of Jersey, including fires, road accidents, emergencies at sea, rescues from height, cliff based operations and incidents involving hazardous substances.

== Performance ==
A review of the service in 2022 highlighted "structural and resourcing challenges" which prevented it from fulfilling basic functions adequately and inhibited necessary change.

In a 2026 report on the States of Jersey Fire and Rescue Service, the Comptroller and Auditor General examined how the service used resources to manage risk and deliver an efficient, effective and economic service. The report found that the service had identified a large number of extreme risks associated with operating at current levels, and made recommendations on risk management, strategic planning, performance indicators, use of growth funding and ministerial oversight. The Jersey Evening Post described the audit as finding that the service lacked capacity and capability to deliver its legal duties safely, while the Minister for Justice and Home Affairs said the department welcomed the audit and would make a formal response.

== Fire stations ==
The service has two fire stations: Rouge Bouillon, which is crewed by wholetime firefighters and retained firefighters; and St Brelade, which is crewed by retained firefighters.

== Inshore rescue ==
The service is trained and equipped to respond to incidents at sea, and close to shore. This can involve recovering people who have become stranded on rocks which are exposed when the tide is low, and submerged at high-tide.

The service has developed its own Inshore Rescue Boat. The hull is a Humber Base, unlike the previous D-class lifeboat (EA16) lifeboat. Fabrication and development included DPM Nautique and FRS Personnel

== Cliff rescue ==
Jersey has many cliffs on its coastline, and the service is able to rescue people from these cliffs using specialised equipment.

== See also ==
- 2012 Jersey gas holder fire
