= Government of Jersey =

Central government of the Bailiwick of Jersey

Government of Jersey Jèrriais: Gouvèrnément d'Jèrri
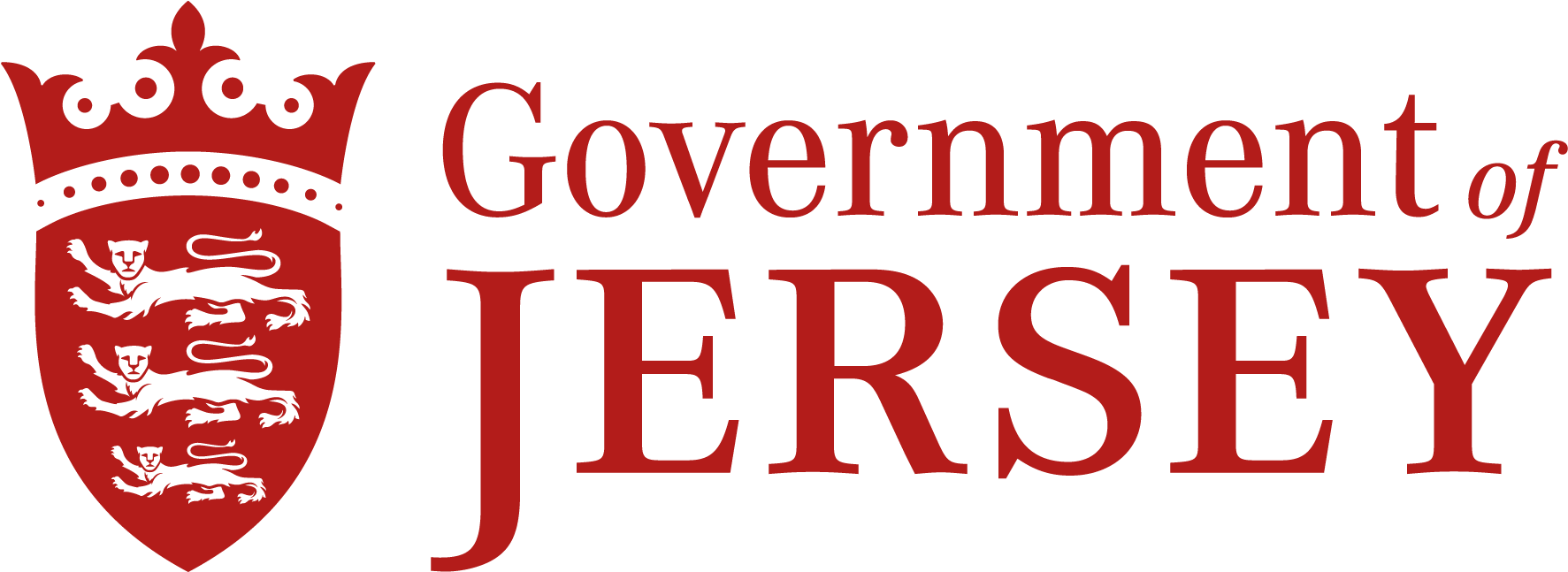
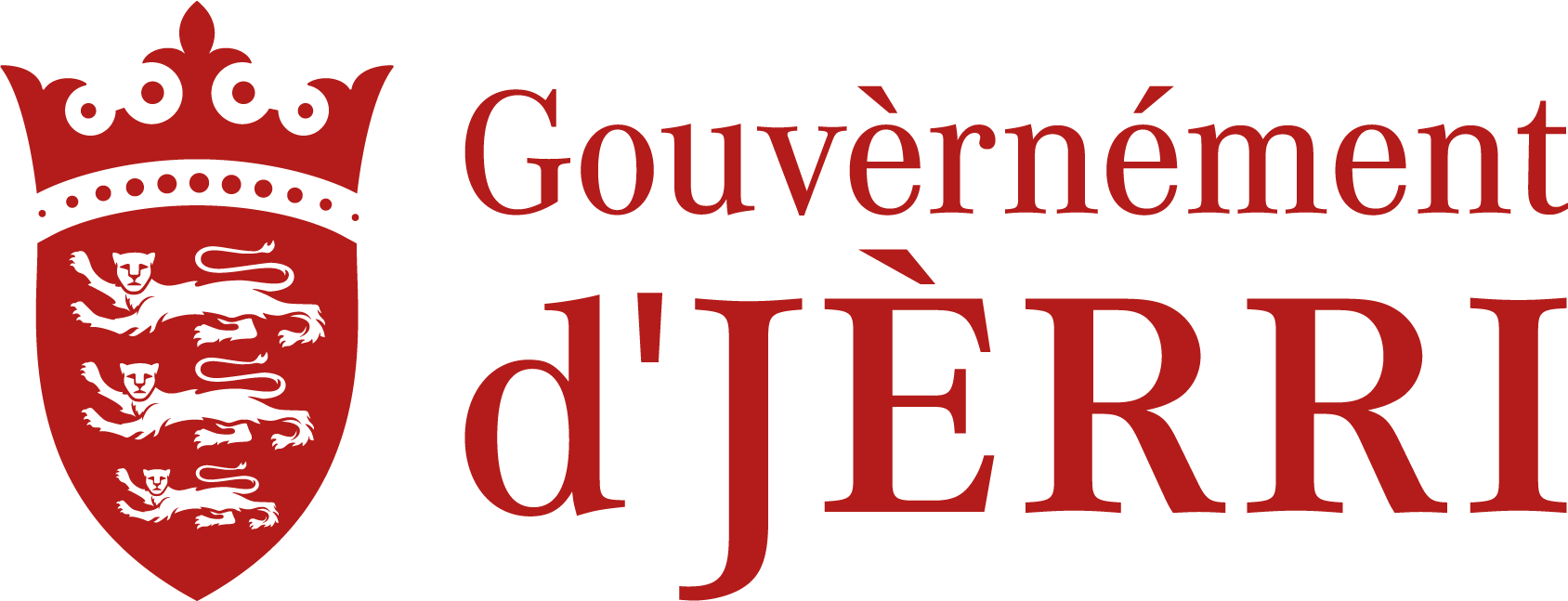
- Logos of the Government of Jersey in English and Jèrriais
- Jurisdiction: Channel Islands

Composition
- Main organ: Council of Ministers

Authority and accountability
- Appointed by: Chief Minister, with approval from the States Assembly.
- Responsible to: States Assembly

Operations
- Website: www.gov.je

Seat
- Union Street, Saint Helier

The Government of Jersey (Jèrriais: Gouvèrnément d'Jèrri) is the executive and administrative government of Jersey, a Crown Dependency in the Channel Islands. It is led by the Chief Minister and the Council of Ministers, whose members are elected members of the States Assembly. Ministers are politically accountable to the States Assembly and are supported by Jersey's public service.

Ministerial government was introduced in 2005, replacing the previous committee system. The Council of Ministers co-ordinates government policy and administration, including the Common Strategic Policy and the annual Government Plan, also known as the Budget. Individual ministers remain legally responsible for many statutory functions and for the departments and agencies that support their areas of responsibility.

Since 2019, 'Government of Jersey' has been used as the official identity for Jersey's executive and administrative functions. The term is distinct from the States Assembly, which is Jersey's elected legislature and holds ministers politically accountable. The older term 'States of Jersey' remains in use in legislation, finance and official documents, and may refer to Jersey's public administration, to the States acting in a legal or corporate capacity, or, in some contexts, to the Assembly.

== History ==
=== Superior Council during the Occupation ===
During the German occupation of Jersey from 1940 to 1945, the occupying forces allowed the island's civil administration to continue under German overall direction. The pre-war system did not continue unchanged: executive government was carried out by an ad hoc body, the Superior Council, chaired by the Bailiff and made up of eight heads of department, including departments responsible for areas such as agriculture and finance. The Superior Council became controversial after liberation. The Jersey Democratic Movement criticised its wartime conduct and alleged maladministration, corruption and collaboration, while later accounts have also emphasised the constraints under which the island administration operated and its role in maintaining essential services under occupation. The experience of wartime administration contributed to post-war demands for constitutional reform and to wider debates about democracy, social policy and the future of self-government in Jersey.

=== Committee government 1945-2005 ===
Until the introduction of ministerial government in 2005, most executive functions were carried out through committees of the States. The system reflected Jersey's non-party political culture and its tradition of limited government: the executive was drawn from the States, and members acted both as legislators and as participants in executive administration. Its political culture was also shaped by parish government, the honorary system and a strong attachment to local self-government and voluntary public service.

The post-war constitutional reforms of 1948 removed the Jurats and Rectors from the States, created 12 island-wide Senators and increased the number of Deputies, but retained committee government rather than creating a cabinet or party-based executive.

Committees had considerable autonomy within their policy areas and directed the corresponding parts of the civil service. The system was regarded by supporters as inclusive and participatory, because most elected members could take part directly in executive work. It was criticised, however, for blurring legislative and executive functions, diffusing political responsibility across several committees, slowing decision-making and making strategic co-ordination more difficult as public administration became more complex.

The Review Panel on the Machinery of Government in Jersey, chaired by Sir Cecil Clothier, reported in 2000. It concluded that the existing committee structure did not provide a clear centre of governmental authority and recommended replacing the 24 States committees with a smaller number of departments, each led by a minister, together with a Council of Ministers and a system of scrutiny by non-executive members.

=== Ministerial government since 2005 ===
Since the implementation of the States of Jersey (Jersey) Law 2005, the executive and legislative functions have been split between the Council of Ministers and States Assembly respectively.

In 2019, the Council of Ministers formally adopted the identity of the 'Government of Jersey' for the executive responsibilities of the States.

=== One Government programme 2018-2022 ===
From 2018, Jersey's public administration was reorganised under the One Government programme (branded ‘OneGov’), implemented under chief executive Charlie Parker. This sought to bring departments together within a more unified corporate structure and was accompanied by changes to senior management, departmental organisation and government premises.

The reforms were criticised for blurring lines of political accountability, particularly where departments no longer had a single ministerial lead. In 2022, the Jersey Evening Post reported that there was no evidence that the reforms had created a more efficient public sector. On 28 April 2022, the States Assembly voted to move away from the One Government model and return to a structure based on minister-led government departments by the end of that year.

== Ministers ==
Ministerial government is governed principally by Part 4 of the States of Jersey Law 2005.

=== Chief Minister ===
The States Assembly selects an elected member as Chief Minister after each ordinary election and in other circumstances specified by the Law, including where the office becomes vacant, the Chief Minister is incapacitated, or the States votes no confidence in the Chief Minister or Council of Ministers.

The Chief Minister-designate proposes Ministers, but other elected members may also nominate candidates; the Chief Minister and Ministers take office once the Assembly has made the selections required to constitute the Council of Ministers.

=== Council of Ministers ===
The Council of Ministers consists of the Chief Minister and at least seven Ministers. Its statutory functions include co-ordinating ministerial policy and administration, agreeing policy affecting more than one Minister, and lodging a common strategic policy. The 2005 Law distinguishes the Council's collective co-ordinating role from the legal responsibilities of individual Ministers: each Minister, including the Chief Minister, is a corporation sole, and Government of Jersey guidance describes Ministers as individually accountable to the States Assembly for the departments and agencies which discharge their responsibilities.

The number of members holding executive office is limited by the so-called Troy Rule. Article 25A of the 2005 Law provides that the aggregate of the Chief Minister, Ministers and Assistant Ministers must not exceed the limit set in the States Assembly Standing Orders, and Standing Order 112A currently sets that limit at 21.

The Chief Minister may, by Order and after reporting to the States, establish, abolish or rename ministerial offices and transfer functions, rights and liabilities between Ministers. A consolidated list of ministerial functions and delegations must be published under Article 30A of the Law.

=== Deputy Chief Minister ===
The Chief Minister must appoint one of the Ministers as Deputy Chief Minister, who discharges the Chief Minister's functions during temporary absence or incapacity or during a vacancy in the office.

=== Assistant Ministers ===
The Chief Minister and Ministers may appoint elected States members as Assistant Ministers; ministerial functions may be delegated to Assistant Ministers or to officers, subject to statutory limits.

=== Code of Conduct ===
The States of Jersey Law 2005 requires the Chief Minister and Ministers, within three months of appointment, to agree and present to the States a code of conduct and a code of practice for Ministers and Assistant Ministers. The current documents are presented together as the Ministerial Code and apply to Ministers and Assistant Ministers as "Executive Members". Alleged breaches of the Ministerial Code may be investigated by the Commissioner for Standards.

=== Collective responsibility ===
Collective responsibility is dealt with in the Ministerial Code. The States of Jersey Law 2005 formerly required the Chief Minister, Ministers and Assistant Ministers to adhere to collective responsibility, but the current Law instead requires the Ministerial Code and gives the Council of Ministers a limited power to direct an individual Minister on policy matters falling within the Council's statutory functions, while excluding directions about the exercise of statutory functions.

Under the Ministerial Code, Executive Members are expected to work as a cohesive team, support ministerial colleagues, seek consensus through debate and constructive challenge, and, after a Council decision, coalesce around a coherent public position. The Chief Minister may, where necessary and appropriate, permit Executive Members to adopt alternative positions, including on matters of conscience or where a Minister has made a published manifesto commitment.

In 2024, Chief Minister Lyndon Farnham told the States Assembly that he would not enforce "full collective responsibility", but would seek ministerial unity where reasonably possible and allow free votes on matters of conscience.

=== Proposals for government as a single entity ===
Under the States of Jersey Law 2005, each Minister, including the Chief Minister, is a corporation sole, with powers such as entering agreements, holding property, and suing or being sued in the name of the office.

The Machinery of Government (Miscellaneous Amendments) (Jersey) Law 2018 included provisions that would have replaced this model with the Government of Jersey as a single corporation aggregate. Those provisions were intended to allow ministerial functions to be exercised more collectively, but they were contained in Part 4 of the 2018 Law, which has not been brought into force. Critics argued that these reforms risked concentrating power in the Chief Minister and senior civil service leadership. As a result, Ministers remain legally separate corporations sole.

== Chief Executive ==
The Chief Executive Officer is the senior official in Jersey's public service. The office holder has four main roles:

- executive officer and principal adviser to the Council of Ministers
- head of the paid civil service, responsible to the States Employment Board
- chief officer of the Chief Minister's Department
- executive officer for the Emergencies Council.

The office is established by the Employment of States of Jersey Employees (Jersey) Law 2005, which provides that the Chief Executive Officer is the Chief Executive to the Council of Ministers and Head of the Public Service. In that capacity, the Chief Executive Officer leads chief officers in the administration and general management of the public service and in the implementation of corporate and strategic policies. The Chief Executive Officer is also the Principal Accountable Officer under the Public Finances (Jersey) Law 2019.

The role was created in 2003, before the introduction of ministerial government, and became part of the machinery of government established after the States of Jersey Law 2005. The Chief Executive is accountable to the Chief Minister and Council of Ministers for the performance of the role, and may be required to give evidence to the Public Accounts Committee and scrutiny panels in the States Assembly.

The office became politically controversial during and after the One Government reforms introduced under Charlie Parker. In 2022, the States Assembly’s Privileges and Procedures Committee Democratic Accountability and Governance Sub-Committee reported concerns that there was an imbalance of power between the Chief Executive, the civil service and elected members, leading to a lack of political accountability for decisions. The report also criticised blurred lines of accountability where departments did not have a single ministerial lead.

The following are the holders of the Chief Executive office.

Office holder	Term	Notes
Bill Ogley	2003 - 2011	First holder of the office. Resigned citing interference and harassment by a minister.
John Richardson	2011 - 2017	Former Deputy Chief Executive and chief officer of Transport and Technical Services. Initially interim Chief Executive on a fixed-term contract; later extended but he left six months early.
Charlie Parker	2018 - 2021	Former Chief Executive of Westminster City Council. Led the One Government reforms, a ‘change of culture’ programme, and planned the move out of Cyril Le Marquand House. Resigned following criticism of his acceptance of a private-sector appointment while serving as Chief Executive
Paul Martin	2021 - 2022	Former head of Wandsworth and Richmond Boroughs. Interim appointment.
Suzanne Wylie	2022 - 2023	Former CEO of Belfast City Council. Resigned after 13 months; an independent review was later commissioned into the circumstances of her resignation.
Andrew McLauglin	2023 - present	Former Chief Executive of RBS International. Appointed interim Chief Executive in 2023; his contract was later extended to December 2026.

== Accountability and scrutiny ==
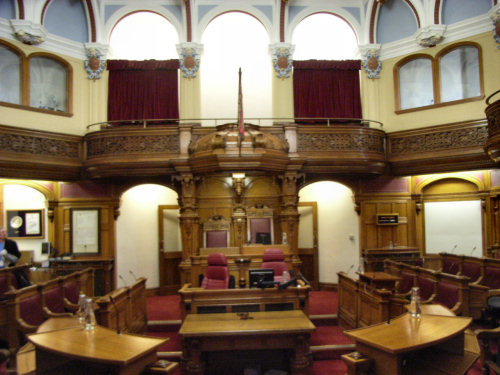
The States Assembly chamber, where ministers answer questions and scrutiny reports may be debated.

The Government is accountable to the States Assembly. The Assembly selects the Chief Minister, elects ministers and may vote that it has no confidence in the Chief Minister, the Council of Ministers or an individual minister. States members may question ministers in the Assembly, and ministers may be required to provide information or give evidence to scrutiny panels. Scrutiny panels are made up of non-executive States members and review government policy, legislation, expenditure and decision-making within their areas of responsibility.

Financial accountability is supported by the Comptroller and Auditor General (C&AG), an independent office responsible for auditing financial statements and considering the use of public funds. The Public Accounts Committee (PAC) considers C&AG reports and scrutinises the use of public money. Jersey's PAC includes both elected States members and non-elected members; comparative research on public accounts committees in the British Isles has described the use of non-elected members in Jersey and Guernsey as an unusual feature which may assist small legislatures by adding expertise and reinforcing non-partisanship. Ministers and senior officials may be called to give evidence to scrutiny panels or the PAC, and ministerial responses to scrutiny and PAC reports are published by the States Assembly.

Within government, the Chief Executive, as Head of the Public Service and Principal Accountable Officer, is accountable to the Chief Minister and Council of Ministers for the performance of the role and may be required to give evidence to scrutiny panels and the Public Accounts Committee.

Ministerial conduct is governed by the Ministerial Code. Alleged breaches of the Code may be investigated by the Commissioner for Standards.

Ministerial decisions and delegations are published by the Government of Jersey, providing a public record of decisions made by ministers, Assistant Ministers and officers acting under delegated authority.

The States of Jersey Complaints Panel provides a further route for administrative accountability. Established under the Administrative Decisions (Review) (Jersey) Law 1982, it considers complaints from persons aggrieved by decisions, acts or omissions relating to matters of administration by ministers, departments or persons acting on their behalf. Complaints are considered by a board drawn from the Panel, which may request reconsideration of a matter but does not itself substitute a binding decision. Proposals to replace or supplement the Panel with a public services ombudsperson have been considered for several years. In 2026, a government report supported the introduction of a public sector ombudsperson and recommended an implementation roadmap.

Several public inquiries and external reviews have examined failures or weaknesses in Jersey public administration. The Independent Jersey Care Inquiry, which reported in 2017, investigated the island's care system from 1945 onwards and identified individual and systemic failings in residential and foster care. Health services and hospital policy have also been the subject of major reviews. In 2022, Professor Hugo Mascie-Taylor reviewed clinical governance and the quality of clinical care at Jersey's hospital. In 2023, the Comptroller and Auditor General reported that more than £130 million had been spent over ten years on successive hospital projects, with almost £39 million written off as abortive, and noted earlier findings of substantial weaknesses in decision-making, governance, accountabilities and programme management. Allegations concerning the Planning Department led to an independent investigation by Norfolk Constabulary; Bailiwick Express reported that no criminal prosecution was recommended, but that investigators identified poor oversight, lack of training, unclear guidance and no approved enforcement procedure.

== Strategic planning and reporting ==
The Government describes its planning and reporting framework as being based on three main documents:

- the Common Strategic Policy,
- the Government Plan also known as the Budget,
- and the Annual Report and Accounts.

The framework is also linked to Future Jersey, a long-term vision based on Island Outcomes and sustainable wellbeing indicators. In some years, ministers have also published ministerial plans setting out individual ministerial priorities and the legislative programme.

The Council of Ministers is responsible for agreeing the Government's common policy programme. Under the States of Jersey Law 2005, the Council must lodge a statement of its Common Strategic Policy for referral to scrutiny panels and approval by the States Assembly. The statement must be lodged no later than the day on which the first Government Plan is lodged and within four months of the Council's appointment. The Common Strategic Policy 2024–2026 was approved by the States Assembly in May 2024 and set out 13 priorities for the Council of Ministers.

Financial planning is carried out through the Government Plan, which the Council of Ministers is required to prepare each financial year under the Public Finances (Jersey) Law 2019. The Government Plan sets out proposed income, expenditure, transfers between States funds, financing and major projects for the next financial year, together with estimates for the following three years. Since the 2025–2028 plan, the Government has used the public-facing title "Budget" for the Government Plan, although this does not alter its legal status under the 2019 Law.

The Annual Report and Accounts is the Government's annual performance and financial reporting document, setting out how public money has been spent and reporting on the activities and finances of entities within the States of Jersey Group.

The planning and reporting framework has been the subject of scrutiny. In 2024, the Comptroller and Auditor General reported that Jersey was among the jurisdictions that had placed sustainable wellbeing in law, but noted that the statutory duty applied to the Government Plan rather than to the Common Strategic Policy. The report also found that there was no statutory duty on officers to take sustainable wellbeing into account when advising ministers or planning public services, and no explicit responsibility on scrutiny panels, the Public Accounts Committee or audit bodies to provide assurance on sustainable wellbeing obligations. The Comptroller and Auditor General recommended that the Council of Ministers should be required to take sustainable wellbeing into account when preparing the Common Strategic Policy and to explain how the policy did so.

The Fiscal Policy Panel provides independent economic advice to the Minister for Treasury and Resources and States members on Jersey's economic outlook, the sustainability of public finances and fiscal policy, including the use of the Strategic Reserve Fund and Stabilisation Fund.

== Public finances ==
Jersey's public finances are governed principally by the Public Finances (Jersey) Law 2019. The Minister for Treasury and Resources is responsible for ensuring that the public finances of Jersey are regulated, controlled and supervised in accordance with the Law, while the Treasurer of the States is responsible to the Minister for the stewardship and administration of public finances. The Chief Executive is the Principal Accountable Officer and has statutory responsibility for propriety, regularity, economy, efficiency and effectiveness in the use of public resources by ministerial States bodies, specified organisations, States funds and trust assets.

Most public income and expenditure is managed through the Consolidated Fund, into which money received by or on behalf of the States is credited unless otherwise provided by law. The Public Finances Law also provides for other States funds, including the Strategic Reserve Fund (a long-term reserve for exceptional circumstances) and the Stabilisation Fund (a counter-cyclical fund used to support fiscal policy during economic cycles). Public spending is authorised through the annual Government Plan (Budget), which sets out income and expenditure proposals for the next financial year and estimates for the following three years.

Some social expenditure is paid through statutory Social Security Funds rather than ordinary departmental budgets:

- the Social Security Fund receives social security contributions and pays contributory benefits, including the old-age pension and incapacity benefit,
- the Social Security Reserve Fund holds invested reserves for future pension provision,
- the Health Insurance Fund pays medical and pharmaceutical benefits,
- and the Long-Term Care Fund pays long-term care benefits.

Income Support (a tax-funded, means-tested benefit for low-income households) is not paid from the Social Security Fund.

The 2026 Budget showed that the largest departmental heads of expenditure were Health and Care Jersey (£381 million), Children, Families, Education and Lifelong Learning (£246 million), Employment, Social Security and Housing (£113 million), Infrastructure and Environment (£75 million), and Justice, Home Affairs and Police (£68 million). The Budget also recorded £308 million of capital expenditure in 2026, including £174.7 million for the New Hospital programme.

The States of Jersey Annual Report and Accounts is the annual performance and financial reporting document for the States of Jersey. In 2025, the States recorded General Revenue Income of £1.23 billion, £1.18 billion spent on services, an overall surplus of £262 million and net assets of £8.9 billion. The Fiscal Policy Panel stated in its November 2025 annual report that day-to-day spending was approaching total income, leaving no headroom for capital spending, and that the trajectory of day-to-day spending was unsustainable without curtailment in future Budgets.

== Public service ==
The Government of Jersey is supported by Jersey's public service. Employment of States staff is overseen by the States Employment Board, which employs persons on behalf of the States and administrations of the States and is responsible for ensuring that the public service conducts itself with economy, efficiency, probity and effectiveness.

At 31 December 2025, the Government's public-sector staffing statistics recorded 8,908 employees, equivalent to 8,239 full-time equivalent posts, across the Government of Jersey and non-ministerial departments. The largest areas by full-time equivalent staff were Health and Care Jersey, Children, Young People, Education and Skills, Justice and Home Affairs, Infrastructure and Environment, and Treasury and Exchequer.

Statistics Jersey uses a broader labour-market definition of the public sector, including Government of Jersey core and zero-hours jobs, government trading bodies, non-States workers paid through the government payroll, the States of Jersey Development Company and employment by the island's 12 parishes. On that basis, there were 9,950 public sector jobs in December 2025, including 8,870 Government of Jersey core jobs and 520 Government zero-hours jobs. Government of Jersey core jobs represented 13.8% of all workforce jobs in the island.

The size of the public service has been the subject of policy debate. In January 2025, Chief Minister Lyndon Farnham said that growth of the number of public sector jobs by 2,500 since 2018 was ‘unacceptable’. The Common Strategic Policy 2024–2026 stated that ministers would curb growth in the public sector, reduce reliance on external consultants and redirect savings to priority areas. The Budget (Government Plan) 2025–2028 included savings proposals based on reducing management layers, removing long-standing budgeted vacancies and limiting consultancy spending, while stating that role savings should protect frontline services. In 2024 and 2025, the Government introduced and then extended a recruitment freeze for some senior and non-frontline roles; official staffing reports recorded a fall in headcount in the year to June 2025, although full-time equivalent staffing increased in areas such as health and education.

== Departments ==
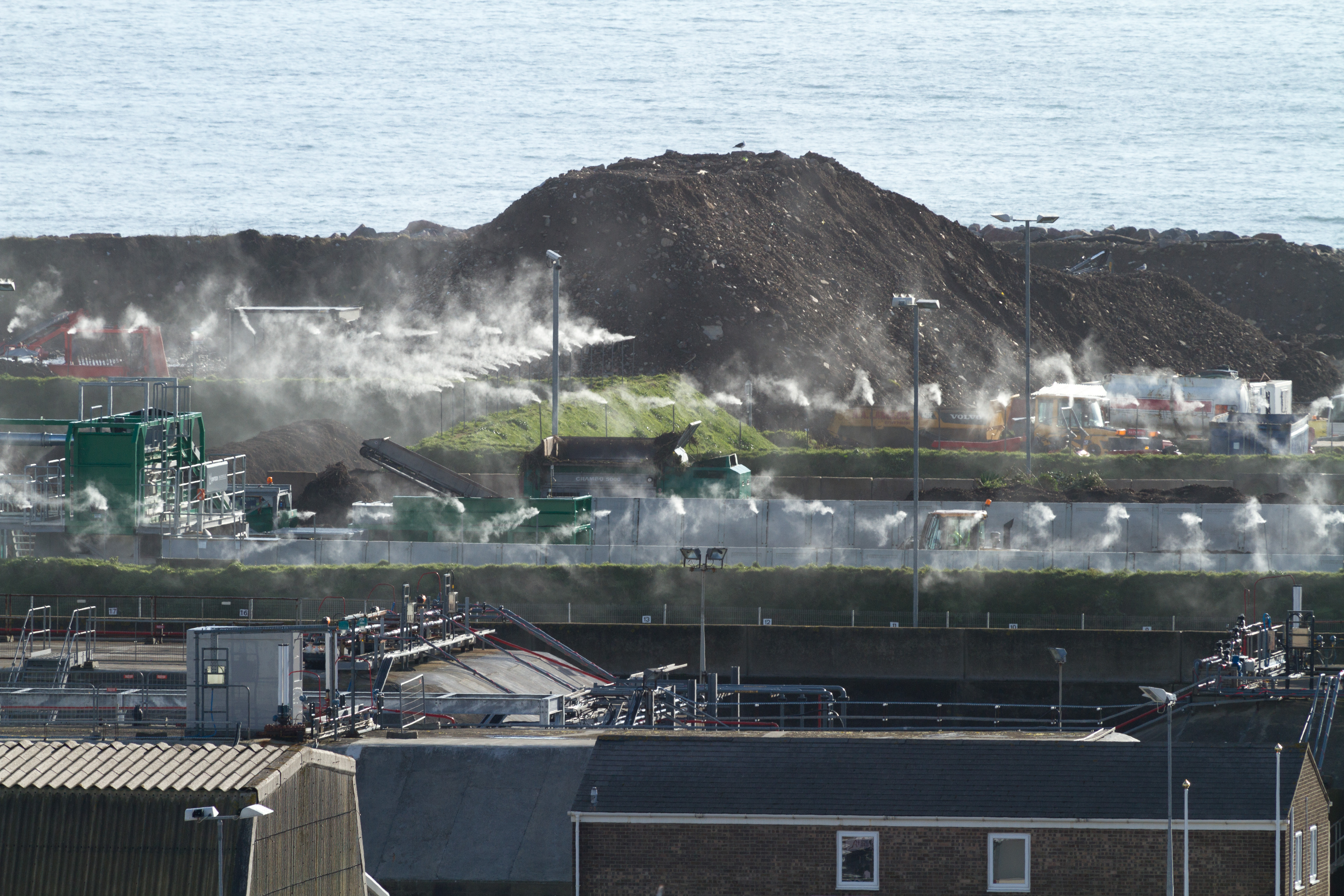
Green-waste processing at La Collette.

The Government of Jersey is supported by departments of the public service. Each department is led by a chief officer and supports ministers in developing policy, administering public services and carrying out statutory functions. The departmental structure has changed over time as part of machinery-of-government reforms.

=== Ministerial departments ===
As of 2026, the Government of Jersey listed nine government departments: the Cabinet Office; Children, Young People, Education and Skills; the Department for the Economy; Employment, Social Security and Housing; Health and Care Jersey; Infrastructure and Environment; Justice and Home Affairs; the Ministry of External Relations; and Treasury and Exchequer.

=== Non-ministerial departments ===
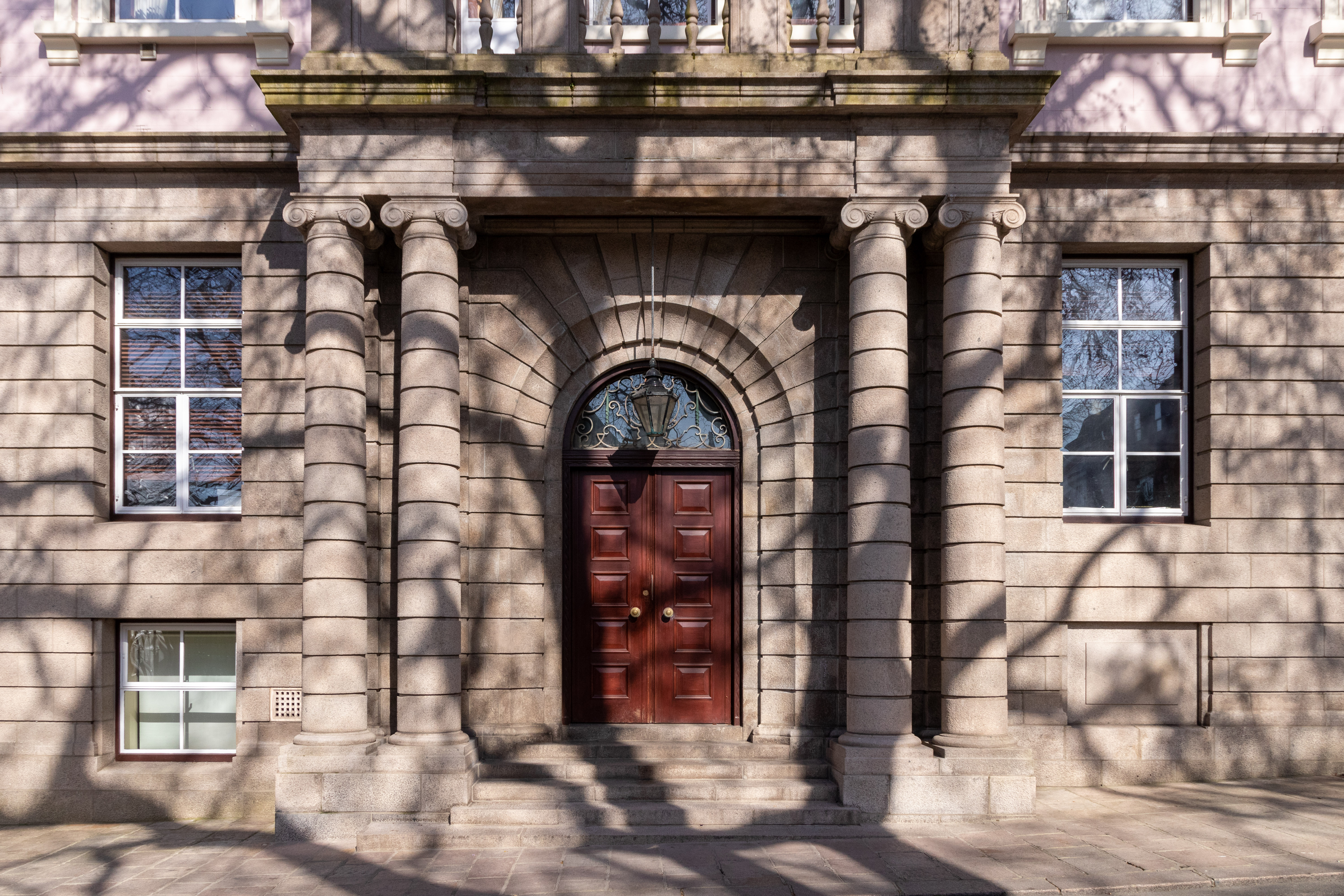
Entrance to the Bailiff’s Chambers: one of the non-ministerial departments

Jersey also has a group of non-ministerial departments, described by the Government as non-executive and legal departments. They form part of the public service but sit outside the ministerial departmental structure and are not accountable to ministers. The States of Jersey Annual Report and Accounts describes them as bodies with diverse functions, operating under different legislation, whose accountable officers are accountable directly to the States Assembly.

In 2025, the non-ministerial department reports covered the States Greffe, Judicial Greffe, Viscount's Department, Law Officers' Department, Bailiff's Chambers, Office of the Lieutenant-Governor, Probation and After-Care Service, States Official Analyst and the Comptroller and Auditor General.

== States-owned entities and arm's-length bodies ==
Some public functions in Jersey are carried out by States-owned entities and arm's-length bodies rather than directly by ministerial departments. The Public Finances Manual describes arm's-length bodies as entities which act wholly or partly independently of the States or Government of Jersey and which may be owned, established or substantially funded by government, or given statutory powers to levy charges.

=== States-owned entities ===
The States has a portfolio of States-owned entities operating in areas including social housing, postal services, telecommunications, ports and airports, property development, water and electricity. The wholly owned companies listed in the Public Finances Manual are Andium Homes Ltd, Jersey Post International Ltd, JT Group Ltd, the States of Jersey Development Company Ltd and Ports of Jersey Ltd.

The States is also the majority shareholder in the Jersey New Waterworks Company Ltd and Jersey Electricity plc.

=== Arm's-length bodies ===
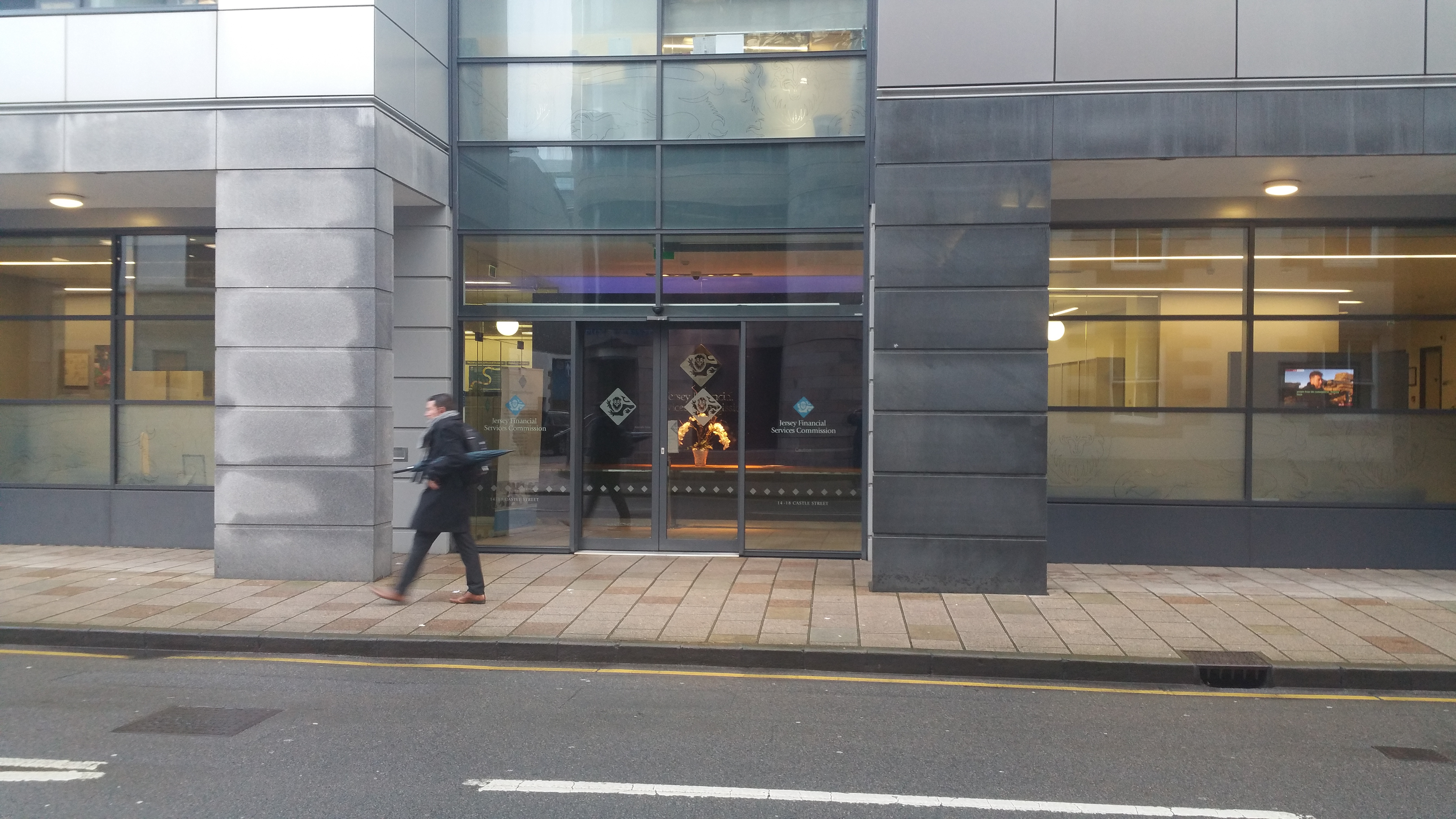
Jersey Financial Services Commission offices — an example of an arm’s-length body.

Other arm's-length bodies include States-established delivery bodies, such as Digital Jersey, Jersey Business, Jersey Finance, Jersey Sport and Visit Jersey, and independent regulatory or oversight bodies, including the Jersey Care Commission, the Children's Commissioner for Jersey, the Jersey Office of the Information Commissioner, the Jersey Competition Regulatory Authority, the Jersey Law Commission, and the Jersey Financial Services Commission. The relationship between the Government and these bodies is generally managed through accountable officers, grant agreements, memoranda of understanding or shareholder arrangements, depending on the legal status and function of the body.

The number, cost and oversight of arm's-length bodies have been the subject of public debate. In 2024, the Comptroller and Auditor General reported that arm's-length bodies could form a valuable part of public service delivery and regulation, but that oversight, governance and accountability arrangements needed strengthening to improve value for money. The Budget 2025–2028 included a review of arm's-length and regulatory organisations, with ministers seeking savings through shared resources and cross-organisational working. In 2026, the States Assembly Public Accounts Committee reported concerns about overlap and duplication within the arm's-length body system and recommended clearer purpose, stronger accountability and reduced duplication.

== Premises ==
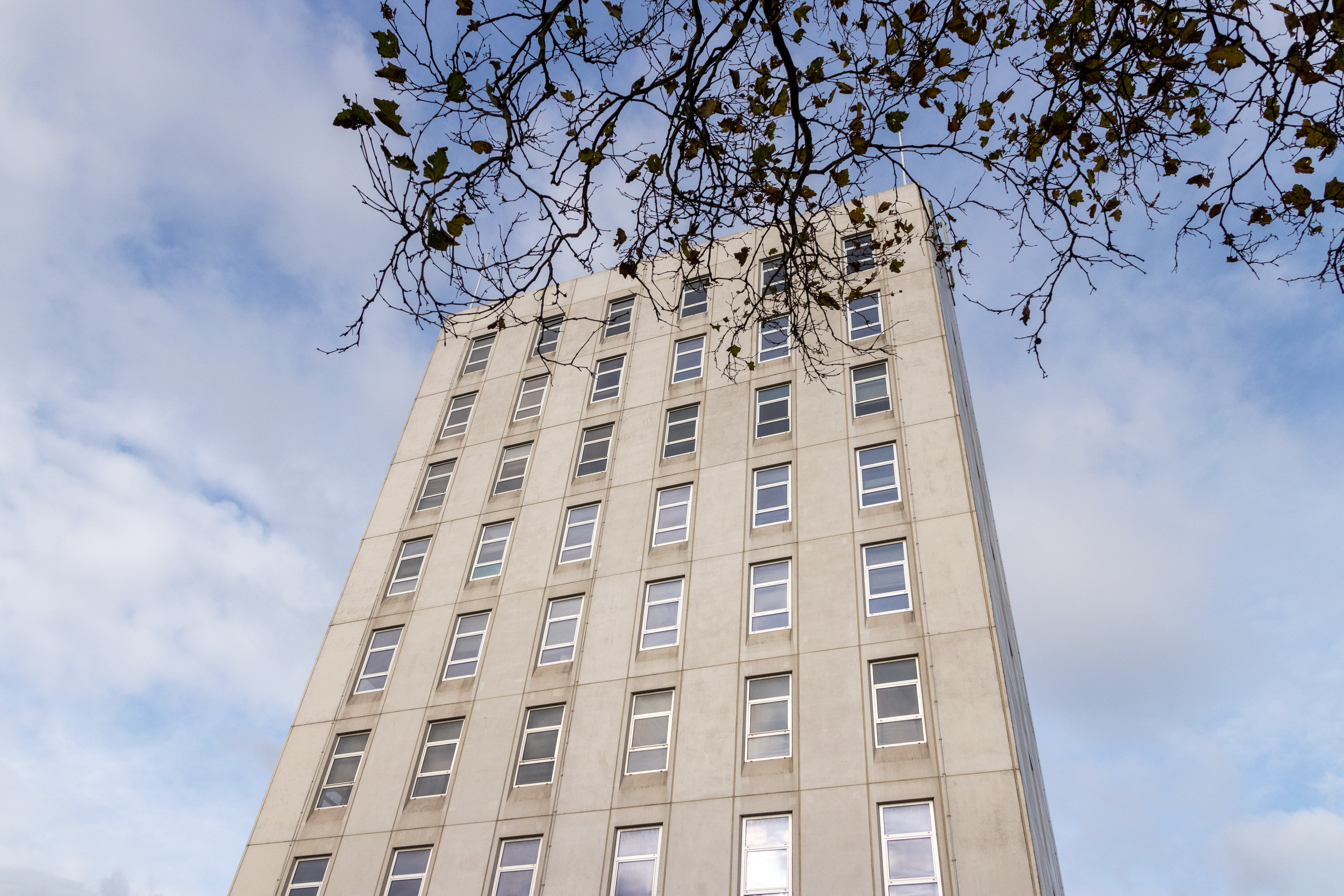
The former Cyril Le Marquand House in Union Street, St Helier, in 2019.

The Government of Jersey's main offices have been located at several sites in St Helier. Cyril Le Marquand House, on The Parade, became the principal States office building in 1982. The building was named after Cyril Le Marquand, a former senator and president of the States Finance Committee.

In 2018, as part of the public-sector reorganisation associated with the One Government programme, the Government announced that its main headquarters would move temporarily to Broad Street with Customer and Local Services based at Philip Le Feuvre House in La Motte Street. The move brought together staff from Cyril Le Marquand House and other offices, including some corporate and administrative staff from health, education, environment and maritime functions.

In 2021, the Government announced that its preferred location for a new headquarters was the Cyril Le Marquand House site at Union Street. The project had an estimated cost of £91 million and was intended to reduce the Government's office estate from 21 buildings to six. The new Government building at Union Street, at the corner of The Parade, opened to the public on 9 December 2024, replacing public-facing services previously provided from La Motte Street.

Not all government functions are based at Union Street. Health and Care Jersey is associated with Jersey General Hospital and Peter Crill House, while some specialist services, including Child and Adolescent Mental Health Services, remain at other premises.

== Local government ==
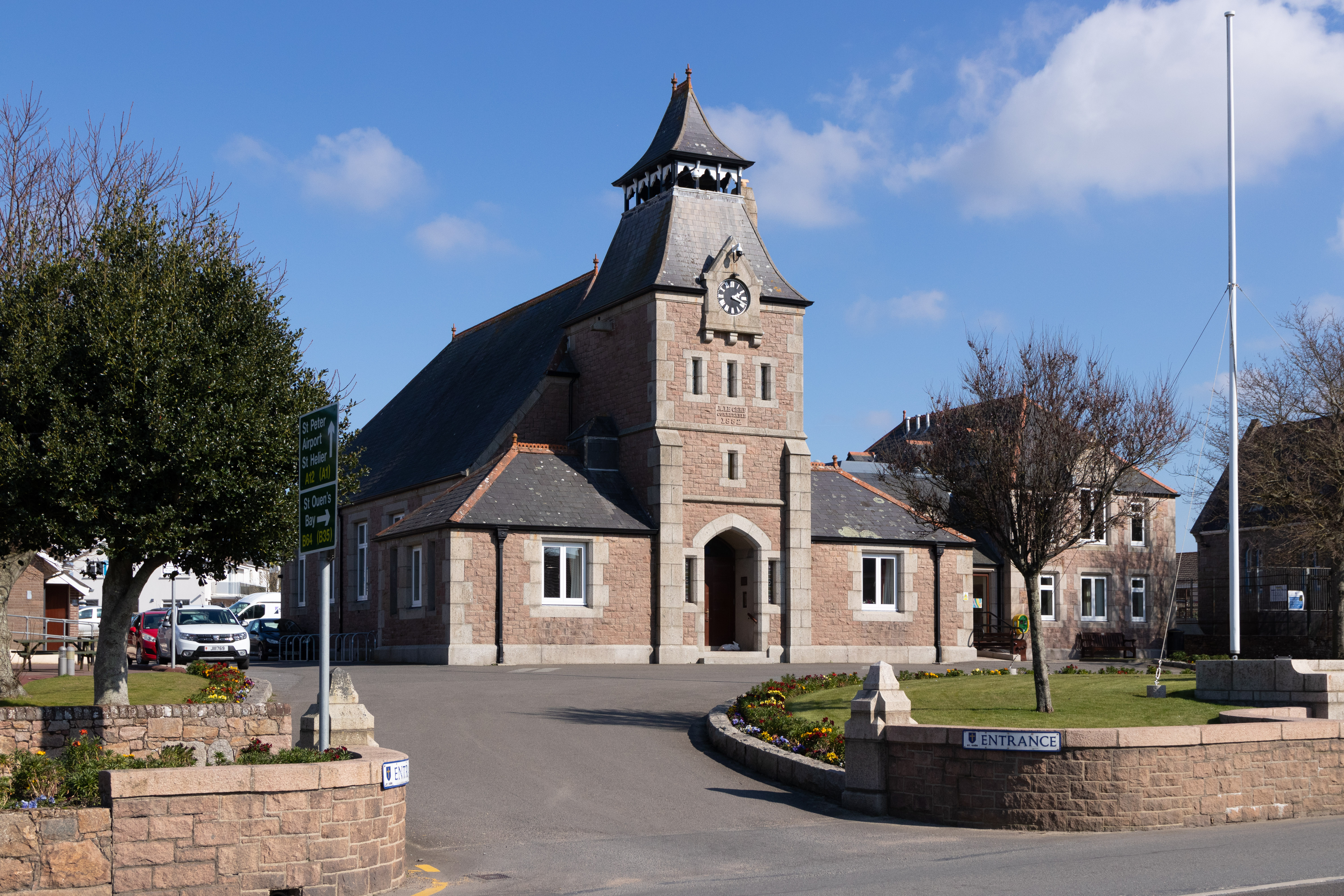
St Ouen's Parish Hall, one of the administrative centres of Jersey's twelve parishes.

Local administration in Jersey is organised primarily through the island's 12 ancient parishes. Each parish is a corporate body separate from its parishioners, and is divided into vingtaines, except in St Ouen where the equivalent divisions are known as cueillettes.

The civil affairs of a parish are conducted through the Parish Assembly, presided over by the elected Connétable. The Assembly's functions include electing parish officers, levying parish rates, considering licensing applications, caring for parish by-roads and approving local improvements. Parish services include matters such as parish rates, dog licences, electoral registration, driving licences, rubbish collection and recycling, which are funded by parish rates.

The parishes remain distinct from the ministerial Government of Jersey, but are linked to island-wide government through the Connétables: each of the 12 Connétables is both the civic head of a parish and an elected member of the States Assembly. The Connétables also meet as the Comité des Connétables to discuss matters of common interest to the parishes.

The parishes are not departments of the Government of Jersey, and Ministers do not exercise general supervisory control over parish administration. Their relationship with central government is instead based on separate statutory and customary law responsibilities, practical co-operation and liaison through the Connétables and the Comité des Connétables. In 2026, the States Assembly's Parishes and Government Review Panel reported on the relationship between the two systems. It concluded that the parishes remained an important part of island life, but that aspects of their legal and administrative framework were outdated and required modernisation rather than centralisation. The Panel recommended clearer and more structured engagement between the Government, the Comité des Connétables and individual parishes, including on shared services, parish rates, honorary policing, refuse and recycling, and the formal status of the Comité. The Chief Minister's response welcomed the review and accepted or noted many of its recommendations, while preserving the distinction between parish autonomy and island-wide government responsibilities.

== See also ==
- Parishes of Jersey
- Council of Ministers
- Law of Jersey
- Constitution of Jersey
- Politics of Jersey
- States Assembly
