= Results of the 2022 Jersey general election =

This article contains the full results of the 2022 Jersey general election by constituency.

== Results for connétables ==
The results for the elections for Connétables were as follows:

=== Grouville ===
Party	Candidate	Votes	%	±%
Independent	Mark Labey	975	51.6	New
Independent	Sarah Howard	903	47.8	New
Rejected ballots		13	0.7	
Turnout		1,891	51.3	

=== St Brelade ===
Party	Candidate	Votes	%	±%
Independent	Mike Jackson	2,333	71.6	
	None of the candidates	882	27.1	New
Rejected ballots		43	1.3	
Turnout		3,258	40.5	

=== St Clement ===
Party	Candidate	Votes	%	±%
Independent	Marcus Troy	2,039	86.8	+9.8
	None of the candidates	291	12.4	New
Rejected ballots		19	0.8	
Turnout		2,349	38.0	

=== St Helier ===
Party	Candidate	Votes	%	±%
Independent	Simon Crowcroft	3,110	58.1	
Independent	Mark Le Chevalier	2,166	40.4	New
Rejected ballots		79	1.5	
Turnout		5,355	31.8	

=== St John ===
Party	Candidate	Votes	%	±%
Independent	Andy Jehan	1,080	95.9	
	None of the candidates	44	3.9	New
Rejected ballots		2	0.2	
Turnout		1,126	49.2	

=== St Lawrence ===
Party	Candidate	Votes	%	±%
Independent	Deidre Mezbourian	934	59.4	
Independent	Emily Joseph	633	40.3	New
Rejected ballots		5	0.3	
Turnout		1,572	42.0	

=== St Martin ===
Party	Candidate	Votes	%	±%
Independent	Karen Shenton-Stone	1,119	94.3	
	None of the candidates	62	5.2	New
Rejected ballots		6	0.5	
Turnout		1,187	43.7	

=== St Mary ===
Party	Candidate	Votes	%	±%
Independent	David Johnson	400	54.8	+3.3
Independent	Mike Fennell	317	43.4	New
Rejected ballots		13	1.8	
Turnout		730	53.1	−7.7

=== St Ouen ===
Party	Candidate	Votes	%	±%
Independent	Richard Honeycombe	955	67.7	New
	None of the candidates	443	31.4	New
Rejected ballots		12	0.9	
Turnout		1,410	50.1	

=== St Peter ===
Party	Candidate	Votes	%	±%
Independent	Richard Vibert	1,150	80.1	
	None of the candidates	278	19.4	New
Rejected ballots		7	0.5	
Turnout		1,435	43.0	

=== St Saviour ===
Party	Candidate	Votes	%	±%
Independent	Kevin Lewis	1,554	57.3	New
	None of the candidates	1,158	42.7	New
Rejected ballots		0	0.0	
Turnout		2,712	35.3	

=== Trinity ===
Party	Candidate	Votes	%	±%
Jersey Alliance	Philip Le Sueur	736	70.4	
	None of the candidates	295	28.2	New
Rejected ballots		14	1.3	
Turnout		1,045	53.0	

== Results for deputies ==
The results for the elections for Deputy were as follows:

As the 2022 elections were the first to be held with the new electoral districts for deputies, no change in percentage values are available.

=== St Helier South ===
Party	Candidate	Votes	%	±%
Reform Jersey	Sam Mézec	955	17.3	
Reform Jersey	Tom Coles	713	12.9	
Reform Jersey	Beatriz Porée	679	12.3	
Better Way	David Warr	616	11.2	
Independent	Russell Labey	591	10.7	
Independent	Judy Martin	496	9.0	
Independent	Nick Le Cornu	418	7.6	
JLC	Angela Jeune	277	5.0	
Independent	Bernie Manning	276	5.0	
Independent	Chris Hopkins	247	4.5	
Jersey Alliance	Jo Luce	220	4.0	
Rejected ballots		22	0.4	
Total votes		5,510	100	
Turnout		1,739	34.6	

=== St Helier Central ===
Party	Candidate	Votes	%	±%
Reform Jersey	Carina Alves	961	15.7	
Reform Jersey	Robert Ward	937	15.4	
Reform Jersey	Lyndsay Feltham	867	14.2	
Reform Jersey	Catherine Curtis	847	13.9	
Reform Jersey	Geoff Southern	734	12.0	
Independent	John Baker	524	8.6	
Independent	Neil Kilbey	436	7.1	
Jersey Alliance	Chris Tanguy	430	7.0	
JLC	Julie Wallman	358	5.9	
Rejected ballots		9	0.1	
Total votes		6,103	100	
Turnout		1,530	28.8	

=== St Helier North ===
Party	Candidate	Votes	%	±%
Independent	Inna Gardiner	1,665	24.1	
Independent	Mary Le Hegarat	1,268	18.4	
Independent	Max Andrews	1,136	16.4	
Independent	Steve Ahier	999	14.5	
Jersey Alliance	Phil Romeril	737	10.7	
Reform Jersey	Trevor Pointon	656	9.5	
Jersey Alliance	Ted Vibert	444	6.4	
Rejected ballots		3	0.0	
Total votes		6,908	100	
Turnout		2,350	36.1	

=== St Saviour ===
Party	Candidate	Votes	%	±%
Independent	Tom Binet	1,541	14.3	
JLC	Malcolm Ferey	1,320	12.3	
Independent	Louise Doublet	1,272	11.8	
Reform Jersey	Raluca Kovacs	1,032	9.6	
Independent	Philip Ozouf	1,000	9.3	
Better Way	Suzanne Webb	946	8.8	
Progress Party	Sophie Walton	770	7.2	
Independent	Lee Cornick	693	6.4	
Independent	Jonathan Channing	606	5.6	
Jersey Alliance	Mary O’Keeffe	590	5.5	
Independent	Kevin Pamplin	567	5.3	
Independent	Jeremy Maçon	411	3.8	
Rejected ballots		21	0.2	
Total votes		10,769	100	
Turnout		3,271	42.6	

=== St Clement ===
Party	Candidate	Votes	%	±%
Better Way	Alex Curtis	1,485	19.6	
Independent	Barbara Ward	1,415	18.7	
JLC	Philip Bailhache	1,251	16.5	
Independent	Karen Wilson	979	12.9	
Reform Jersey	Ken Addison	929	12.3	
Jersey Alliance	Lindsay Ash	779	10.3	
Jersey Alliance	Mark Boleat	721	9.5	
Rejected ballots		8	0.1	
Total votes		7,567	100	
Turnout		2,476	40.1	

=== St Brelade ===
Party	Candidate	Votes	%	±%
Independent	Helen Miles	2,370	21.7	
Independent	Moz Scott	1,783	16.4	
Independent	Jonathan Renouf	1,782	16.3	
Reform Jersey	Montfort Tadier	1,503	13.8	
Progress Party	Steve Pallett	1,328	12.2	
Reform Jersey	Nigel Jones	888	8.1	
Progress Party	Steve Bailey	662	6.1	
Jersey Alliance	James Corbett	421	3.9	
Independent	Karl Busch	162	1.5	
Rejected ballots		6	0.1	
Total votes		10,905	100	
Turnout		3,132	38.9	

=== St Mary, St Ouen, and St Peter ===
Party	Candidate	Votes	%	±%
Better Way	Kristina Moore	2,730	23.9	
Better Way	Lucy Stephenson	2,239	19.6	
Independent	Ian Gorst	2,208	19.3	
Independent	Lyndon Farnham	1,101	9.6	
JLC	David Benn	1,053	9.2	
Reform Jersey	Helen Evans	1,050	9.2	
Jersey Alliance	Rowland Huelin	1,025	9.0	
Rejected ballots		15	0.1	
Total votes		11,421	100	
Turnout		3,685	48.9	

=== St John, St Lawrence, and Trinity ===
Party	Candidate	Votes	%	±%
Independent	Kirsten Morel	2,688	21.0	
Independent	Hilary Jeune	2,601	20.4	
Independent	Elaine Millar	2,241	17.5	
Independent	Andy Howell	1,722	13.5	
Jersey Alliance	Gregory Guida	1,166	9.1	
Jersey Alliance	John Le Fondré	997	7.8	
Independent	Mary Venturini	925	7.2	
Jersey Alliance	Hugh Raymond	421	3.3	
Rejected ballots		17	0.1	
Total votes		12,778	100	
Turnout		3,779	47.2	

=== Grouville and St Martin ===
Party	Candidate	Votes	%	±%
Independent	Carolyn Labey	1,981	25.7	
Progress Party	Steve Luce	1,616	21.0	
Independent	Rose Binet	1,481	19.2	
Independent	Piers Sangan	1,307	17.0	
Jersey Alliance	Philip Le Claire	792	10.3	
Independent	Guy De Faye	491	6.4	
Rejected ballots		26	0.3	
Total votes		7,694	100	
Turnout		3,302	51.6	
