= Susan Pinel =

Jersey politician

Susan Jane Pinel

Minister for Treasury and Resources
- In office 6 June 2018 – 22 June 2022
- Preceded by: Alan J. H. Maclean
- Succeeded by: Ian Gorst

Minister for Social Security
- In office 7 November 2014 – 6 June 2018
- Preceded by: Francis Le Gresley
- Succeeded by: Judy Martin

Deputy of the States Assembly
- In office 14 November 2011 – 22 June 2022
- Constituency: St Clement
- Majority: 1,314 (50%)

Personal details
- Party: Independent (2011–2021); Jersey Alliance (2021–present)

Susan Jane Pinel is a former Jersey politician. She was a deputy in the States Assembly for St Clement between 2011 and 2022, the Minister for Social Security between 2014 and 2018, and the Minister for Treasury and Resources between 2018 and 2022.

== Early life ==
Prior to entering politics, she worked in art restoration for the British royal family for eleven years, repairing miniature portraits which had been damaged in the 1992 Windsor Castle fire. She received a Royal Warrant in 2001 for her work.

== Political career ==
In the 2011 general election on 19 October 2011, Pinel was elected to the States Assembly with 1,314 votes (50%), becoming one of two deputies to represent St Clement alongside Gerard Baudains. She was sworn into office on 14 November 2011. In November 2011, Pinel was one of Sir Philip Bailhache's nominators for the 2011 election of the Chief Minister of Jersey. She served as the Assistant Minister for Social Security from 2011 to 2014.

Pinel was re-elected in the 2014 general election on 15 October 2014, receiving 1,541 votes (35.5%). On 7 November 2014, she was elected as Social Security Minister for Jersey, after winning a challenge against Judy Martin and Geoff Southern with 33 votes. She had been nominated by the Chief Minister, Senator Ian Gorst.

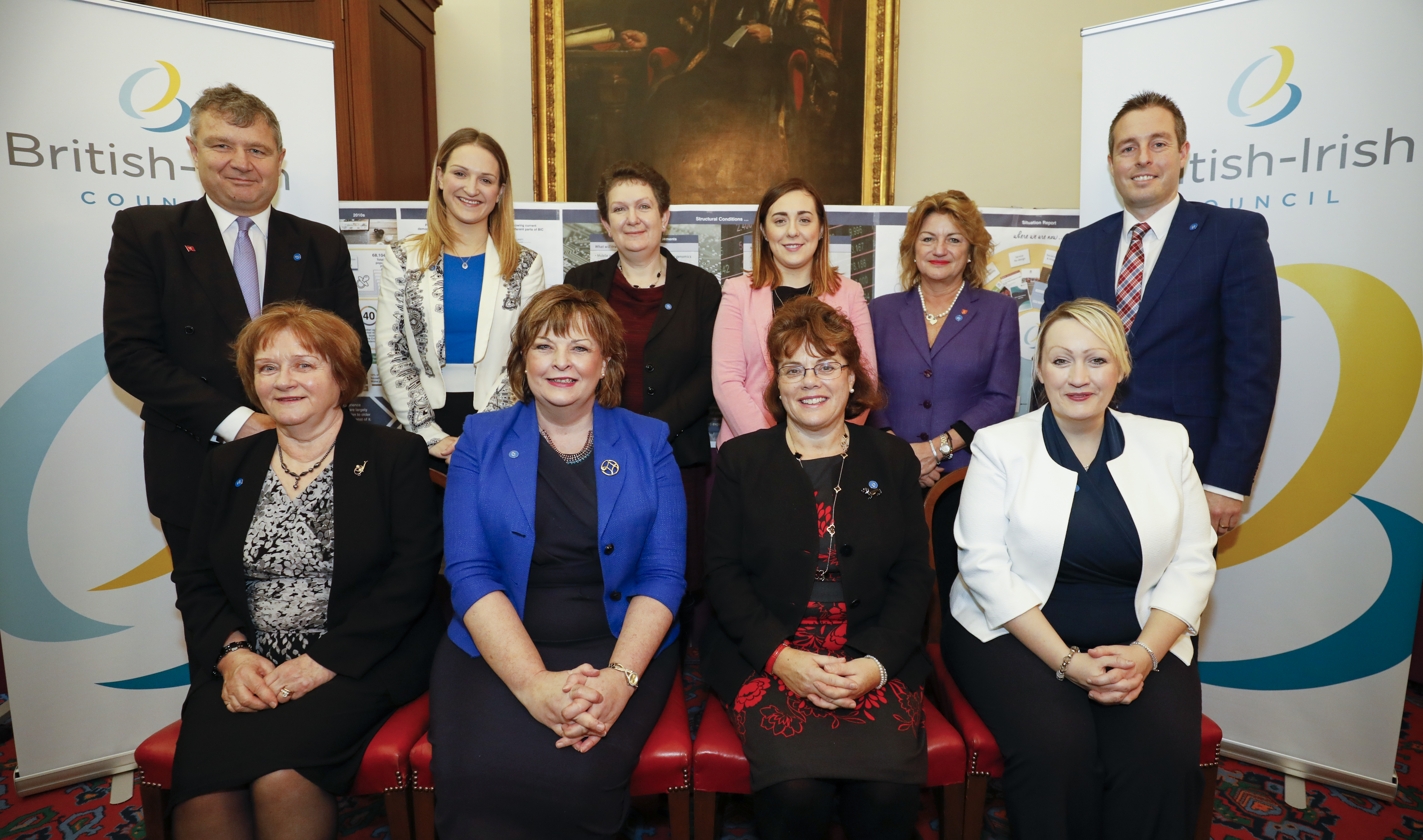
Pinel (standing, second from the right) with other members of the British–Irish Council in 2016

She was re-elected again in the 2018 general election on 16 May 2018, receiving 1,499 votes (31.4%). On 6 June 2018, she was named by the Chief Minister, Senator John Le Fondré, as his ministerial nominee for Minister for Treasury and Resources. She was elected unopposed the following day. In 2020, she backed a proposal to amend the tax code to remove a provision from 1928. The provision considered a wife's income to belong to her husband, and did not allow a woman to speak to Revenue Jersey about tax matters without her husband's permission.

In July 2021, she joined the Jersey Alliance, a new centre-right political party which was founded by Chief Minister Le Fondré and Deputy Gregory Guida. She chose not to stand for re-election in the 2022 general election held on 22 June 2022. She was replaced as Minister for Treasury and Resources by Ian Gorst.

== Personal life ==
Pinel is a chairman of Brig-Y-Don Children’s Charity, and she is a governor of Le Rocquier School. Her cousin is fellow Jersey politician Mark Boleat.

Political offices
Preceded by Alan J. H. Maclean	Minister for Treasury and Resources; 2018–2022	Succeeded by Ian Gorst
Preceded by Ian Gorst	Deputy for St Clement; 2011–present	Succeeded by Alex Curtis
Preceded by Francis Le Gresley	Social Security Minister; 2014–2018	Succeeded by Judy Martin
