= Malcolm Ferey =

Jersey politician

Assistant Chief Minister of Jersey
- Incumbent
- Assumed office 2024

Deputy for St Saviour
- Incumbent
- Assumed office 28 June 2022
- Preceded by: New constituency

Personal details
- Born: Malcolm Ross Ferey Jersey
- Party: Independent (2026–present)

Malcolm Ross Ferey is a Jersey politician who has served in the States Assembly as a Deputy for St Saviour since 2022. He is Minister for Housing and Assistant Chief Minister in the Council of Ministers.

He was elected as a candidate of the Jersey Liberal Conservatives in 2022, remaining with the party after it was renamed Advance Jersey in 2025, before contesting the 2026 Jersey general election as an independent.

== Early life and career ==
Ferey worked in the finance industry before joining the States of Jersey Social Security Department, where he worked in fraud and compliance. In 2010 he became chief executive of Citizens Advice Jersey and in 2021 joined the charity Headway. He served as a centenier in the Honorary Police for the Parish of St Helier between 1997 and 2001.

== Political career ==
Ferey first stood for election in the 2014 Jersey general election, contesting a Senator seat as an independent but was unsuccessful.

He was elected as one of the Deputies for St Saviour at the 2022 Jersey general election, standing for the centre-right Jersey Liberal Conservatives, which contested the election in alliance with the Progress Party. During the 2022–2026 Assembly he served as an Assistant Minister for Children and Families and, following the formation of Lyndon Farnham's administration in 2024, as Assistant Chief Minister. He also served as an Assistant Minister for Sustainable Economic Development, vice-chair of the States Employment Board and a member of the Privileges and Procedures Committee. The Jersey Liberal Conservatives were renamed Advance Jersey in 2025, and Ferey remained a member of the party during the remainder of the Assembly term.

Before the 2026 Jersey general election, however, he announced that he would seek re-election as an independent candidate rather than under the Advance Jersey banner. He was re-elected as Deputy for St Saviour in 2026. In June 2026, Ferey was nominated by Chief Minister Lyndon Farnham for appointment as Minister for Housing. He defeated Deputy Hilary Jeune by 32 votes to 16 in a contested election in the States Assembly. He is vice-chair of the States Employment Board, which oversees employment matters for the Government of Jersey's public service.

== Electoral history ==
Election	Office	Party	Result
2014 Jersey general election	Senator	Independent	Not elected
2022 Jersey general election	Deputy for St Saviour	Jersey Liberal Conservatives	Elected
2026 Jersey general election	Deputy for St Saviour	Independent	Elected

== See also ==
- States Assembly
- Council of Ministers (Jersey)
- Advance Jersey
