= Vingtaine du Rocquier =

Vingtaine in Saint Clement, Jersey

Vingtaine du Rocquier Rocquier
- Vingtaine
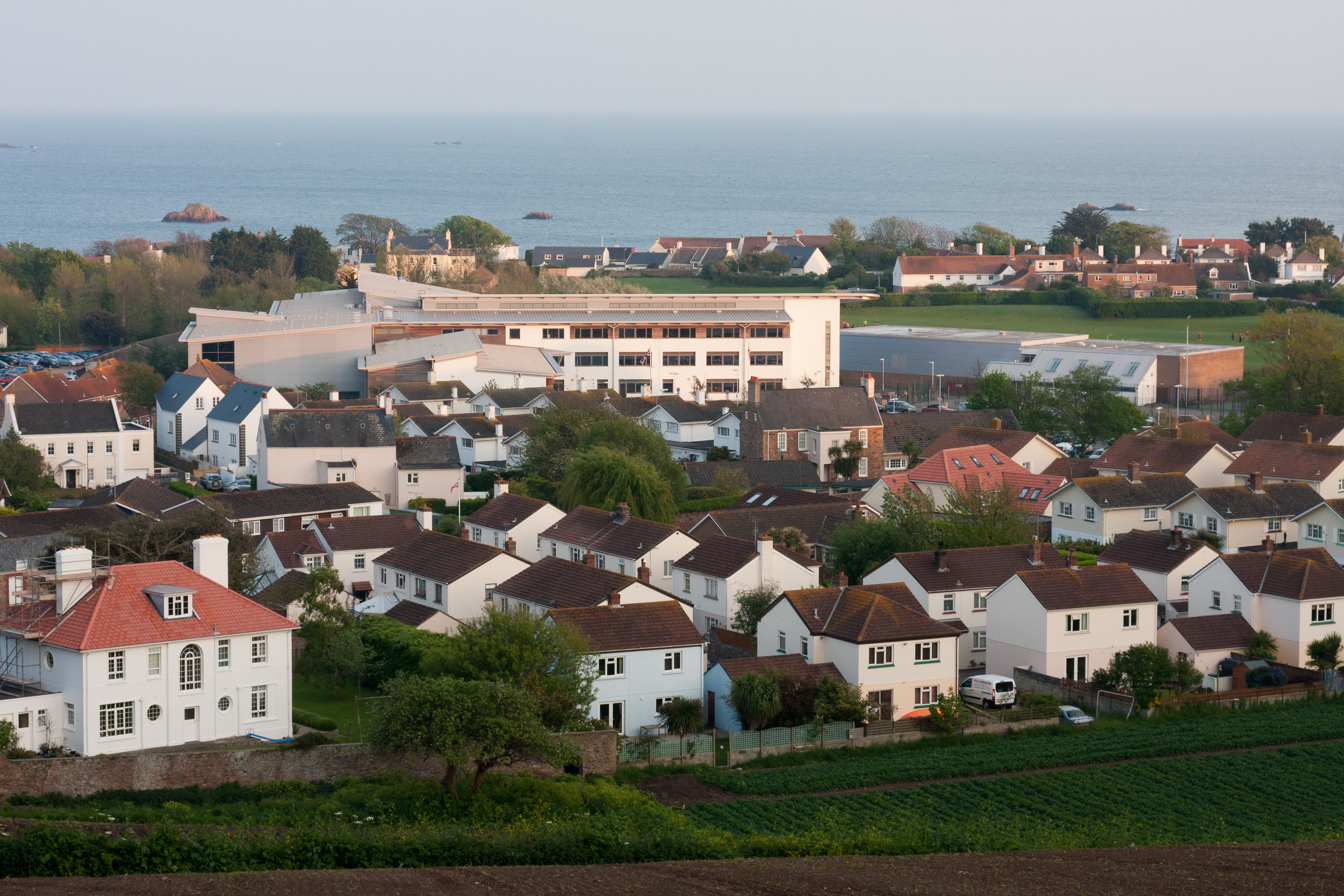
- Le Rocquier school

- Location within Jersey Location within Channel Islands
- Coordinates: 49°10′12″N 2°03′55″W
- Country: Jersey
- Parish: Saint Clement

Population (January 1, 2021)
  - Total: 758
- Time zone: UTC+00:00
- Postal code: JE2–6FP

Vingtaine du Rocquier (Jèrriais: Vîngtaine du Rotchi) is one of the three vingtaines of the Parish of Saint Clement in Jersey. Rotchi means rock or rocky place in Jèrriais, and the vingtaine covers generally low-lying coastal terrain stretching north from Le Hocq and rising up hillsides. Within the vingtaine are Saint Clement's school (primary) and Le Rocquier School.

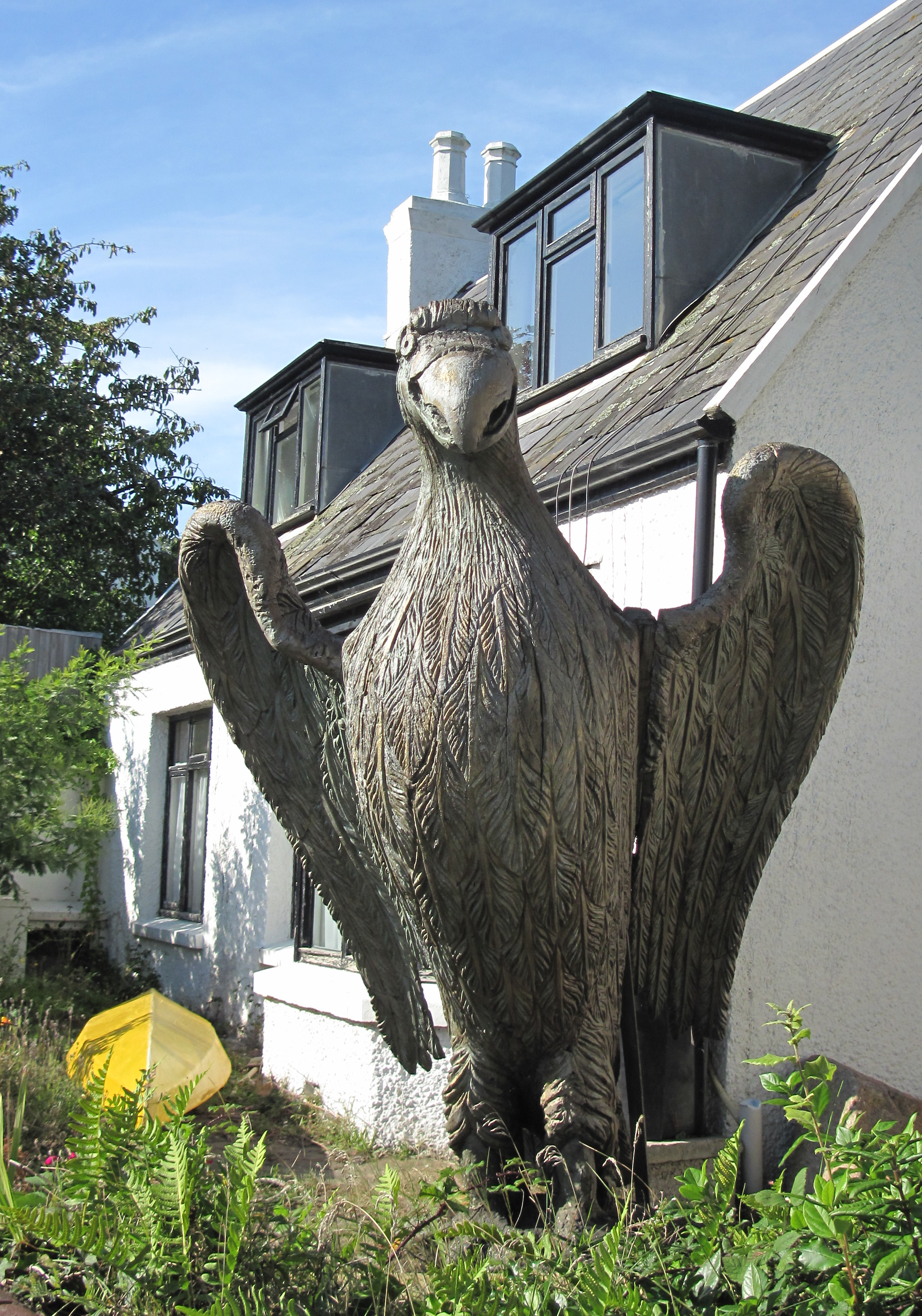
The wooden sculpture of a bird is a landmark of the vingtaine

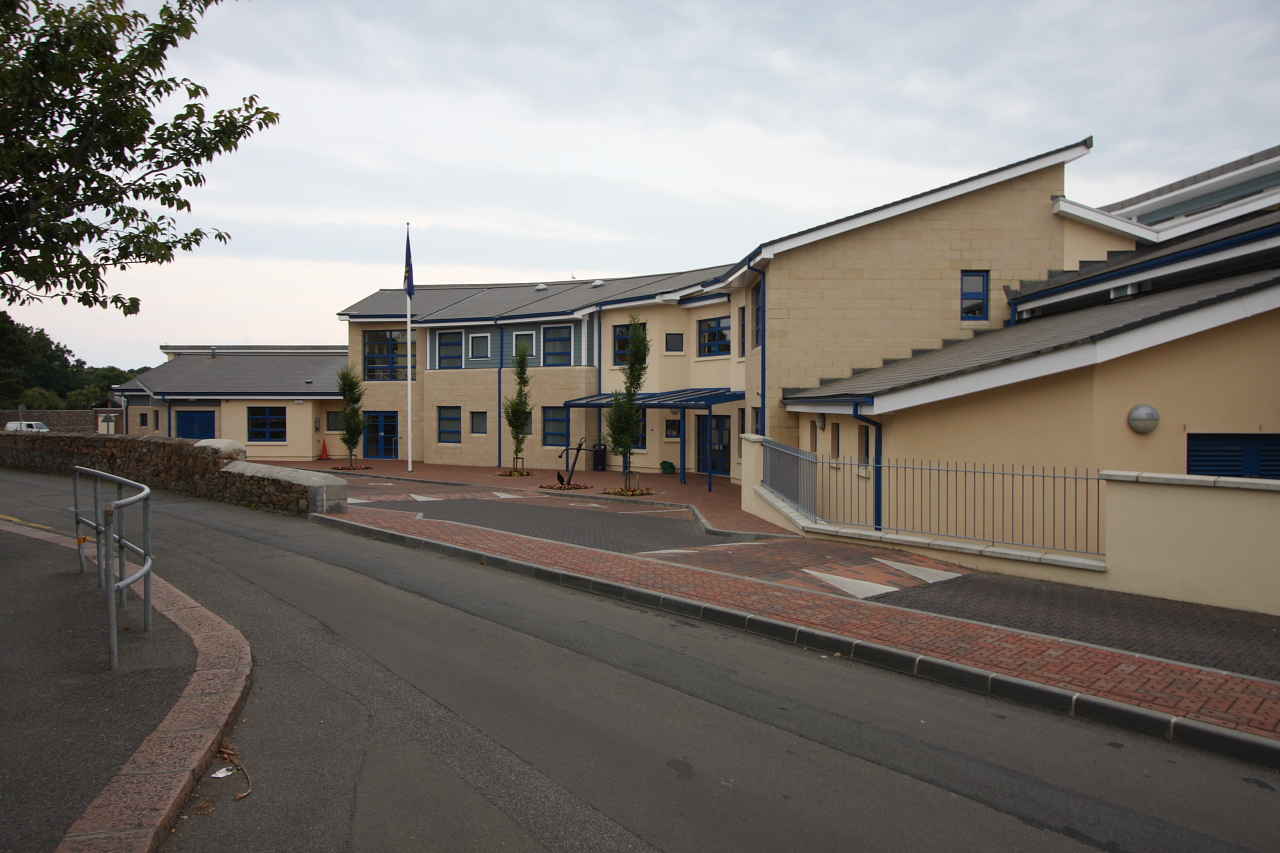
Saint Clement's school

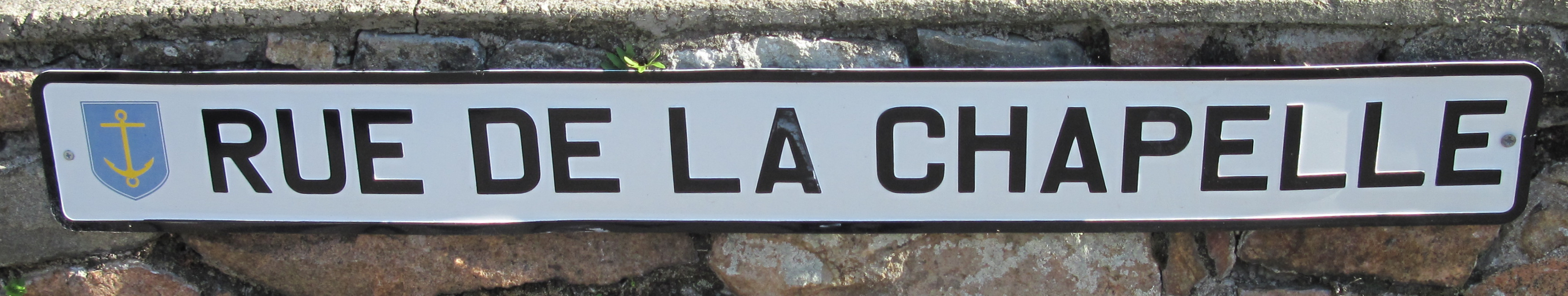
This road name perpetuates the memory of a long-vanished chapel

== See also ==
- Vingtaine de Samarès
- Grande Vingtaine
