= Jersey Alliance =

Political party in Jersey

- Abbreviation: JA
- Leader: Mark Boleat
- Chairman: Gregory Guida
- Secretary: Mary O'Keeffe
- Treasurer: Chris Leck
- Membership Secretary: Lindsay Ash
- Deputy Chairman: Rowland Huelin
- Founded: 16 July 2021
- Ideology: Conservative liberalism Economic liberalism
- Political position: Centre-right
- Colours: Blue
- States Assembly: 0 / 49

Website
- jerseyalliance.je

The Jersey Alliance is a centre-right party in Jersey, formed in 2021 by States Assembly deputy Gregory Guida to compete in the 2022 general election.

From the party's founding in 2021 until the 2022 Jersey election, Jersey Alliance led the Government of Jersey with party member John Le Fondré serving as Chief Minister. In 2022, Mark Boleat was appointed as the leader of the party and nominated to be the next Chief Minister. As a result of the 2022 general election, the Jersey Alliance party lost a majority of its nine seats that it had previously held in the States Assembly and was reduced to a single seat, held by an uncontested Connétable in the parish of Trinity. Party leader Mark Boleat stood in the district of St Clement and was defeated on election day. Boleat received the fewest votes of any candidate with 721 votes. John Le Fondré also was defeated on election day, becoming the first Jersey Chief Minister to lose his seat in an election.

Less than a month after the general election, the Party's sole elected member, Constable Philip Le Sueuer, announced that he had resigned from the Party.

== Electoral performance ==
States Assembly
Election	Leader	Votes		Seats			Position	Government
Election	Leader	No.	Share	No.	±	Share	Position	Government
2022	Mark Boleat	9,480	9.2	1 / 49	▼8 (Note: 9 sitting members of the States Assembly had joined Jersey Alliance before the 2022 election, making it the party with the most seats before the election.)	2.0	▼3rd	Independent–Better Way–Jersey Liberal Conservatives

== See also ==
- Political parties in Jersey
- Politics of Jersey
- Constitution of Jersey
