= Coastal fortifications of Jersey =

Jersey is a heavily fortified island with coastal fortifications that date to the English Civil War, the Napoleonic Wars, and Nazi Germany's occupation of the Channel Islands. The fortifications include castles, forts, towers, Martello towers, artillery batteries, and seawalls. Not infrequently, fortifications from one period are built on the site of earlier fortifications, or very near them, geography having remained the same even when firepower increased.

As of 2013, some of the fortifications are museums, or holiday accommodation, private homes, and event and sport venues. Most are under the control of the States of Jersey, Jersey Heritage, the National Trust for Jersey, and the Channel Islands Occupation Society.

== Castles ==
Castle	Year started	Parish	Way-point	Notes
Mont Orgueil	1204	Saint Martin	49.1994°N 2.0194°W	Adjacent to Gorey harbour
Grosnez Castle	1330	Saint Ouen	49.2575°N 2.24644°W	Ruin; located on Grosnez Point
Elizabeth Castle	1594	Saint Helier	49.175°N 2.125°W	Located on a tidal island

== Forts ==
Fort	Year started	Parish	Way-point	Notes
Saint Aubin's Fort	1542	Saint Brélade	49.1844°N 2.1614°W	The fort stands on a tidal island and was finished in the 1540s. At that time St Aubin was the primary port on Jersey and the fort controlled the entrance. A causeway extends from the road in front of the Royal Channel Islands Yacht Club to the fort, and one can walk out at low tide. However, the fort itself is closed to the public. Jersey's Sea Scouts use the fort as a headquarters, storing their sails and other equipment in a German bunker built into the fort. They have also converted a room in the tower into a classroom.
Fort Regent	1806	Saint Helier	49.1813°N 2.1059°W	Substantial fort on Mont de la Ville and minor works on the nearby South Hill
Fort Henry		Grouville	49.1859°N 2.0345°W	
Fort William		Grouville	49.1944°N 2.0319°W	
Fort Leicester	1836	Trinity	49.2402°N 2.0817°W	Overlooks Bouley Bay. This location has been used since at least 1596 when a demi-culverin was positioned here
La Crête Fort		Saint John	49.2513°N 2.1118°W	
L’Étacquerel Fort	1836	Trinity	49.2383°N 2.0670°W	
Le Câtel Fort	1780s	Saint Mary	49.2481°N 2.1985°W	Built to protect Grève de Lecq Bay from French invasion, it was originally armed with three 32-pounder guns.

== Coastal towers (pre-World War II) ==
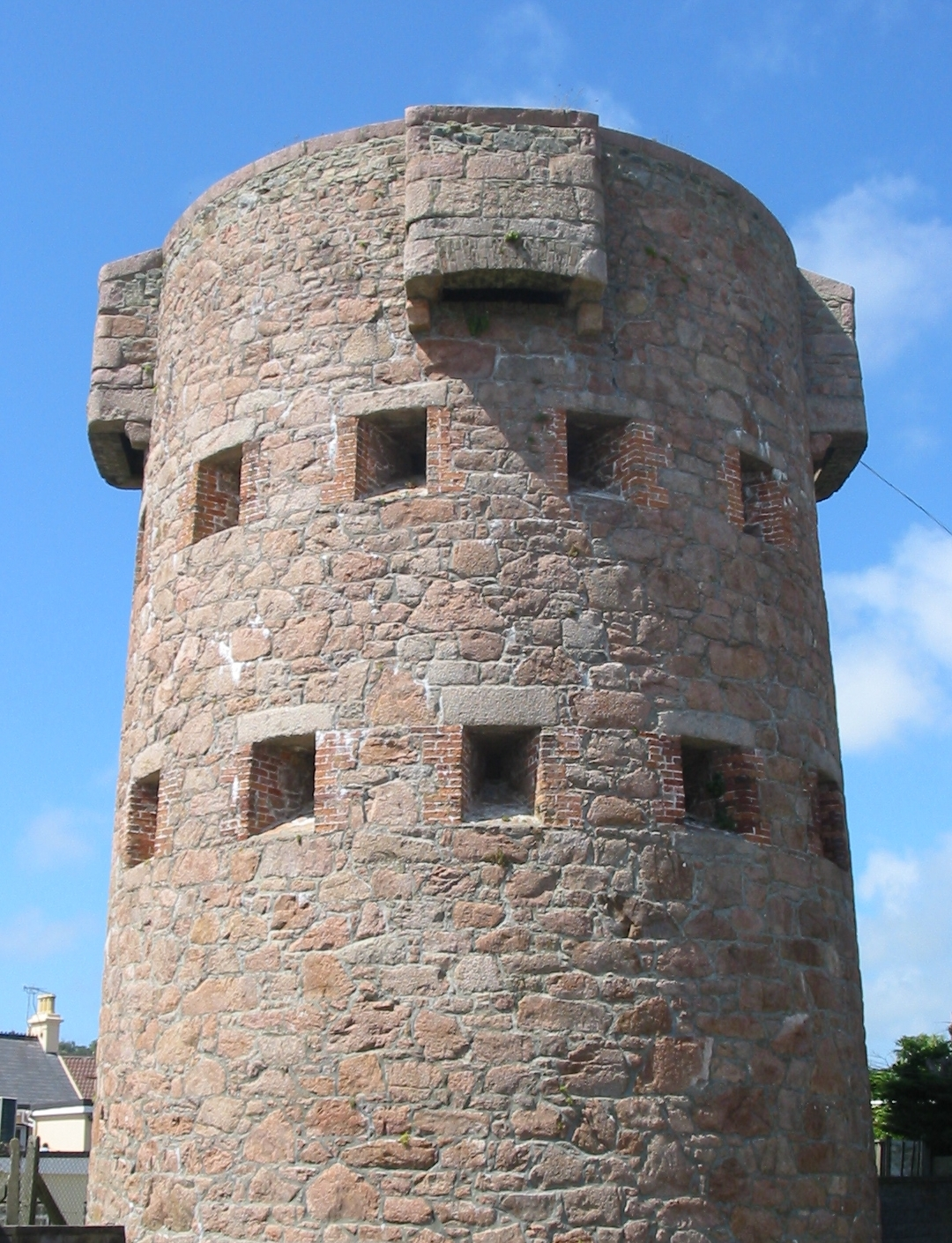
A Jersey Round Tower

Coastal towers stand all along the coast of the island. The British built 22 round towers, one similar square tower, and eight Martello towers towards the end of the 18th century and in the early to mid-19th century, but now only 24 remain, including seven of the Martellos.

=== Conway's towers ===
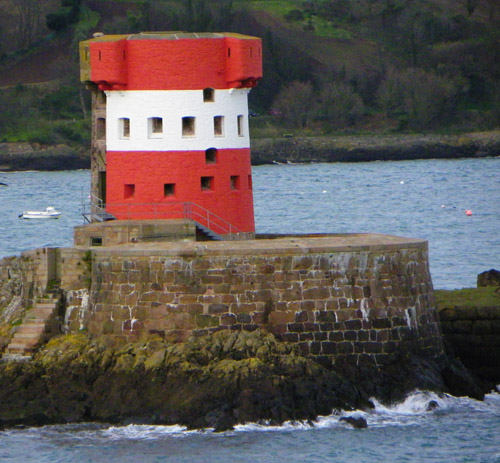
Archirondel tower, Jersey

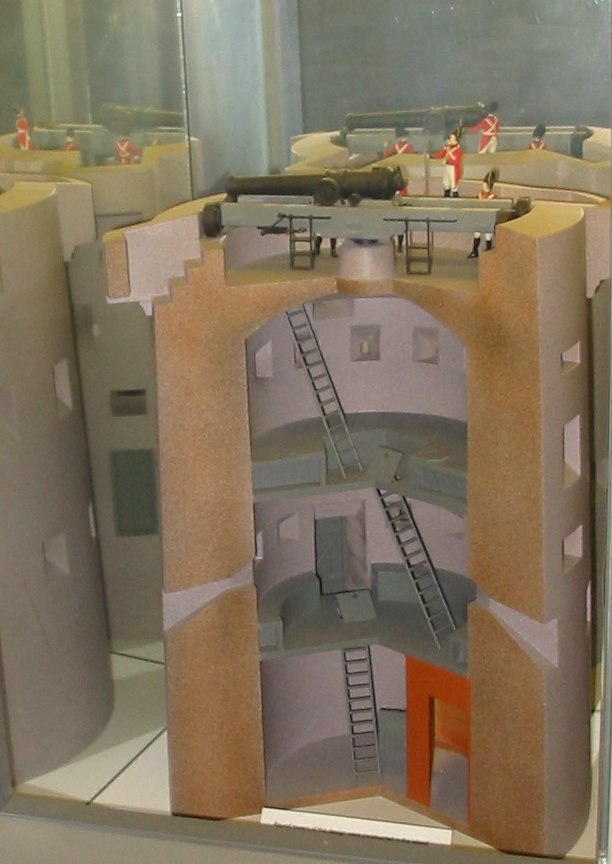
Model of the tower

On 28 May 1778, the governor of Jersey, Field Marshal Henry Seymour Conway, submitted plans to Lord Weymouth for the construction of 30 coastal towers to forestall, or at least impede French incursions on the island. King George III granted approval and funding on 5 July 1778.

Work began in 1779, after a failed French landing at St Ouen's Bay on 1 May 1779. Perhaps four had been completed by the time of the Battle of Jersey in 1781, in which however they played no part. Guernsey, which the French did not attack, had built 15 loophole towers between 1778 and 1779.

Seymour Tower, which replaced an earlier tower on the same spot at La Rocque, was built of granite and was the only square tower. The other 22 towers that Conway had constructed were round.

Although frequently called Martello towers, the round towers are taller, and they predate the development of true Martello towers. The round towers differ from Martello towers in several ways. The Jersey towers are mostly built with local granite rather than brick, have a slighter batter (taper), and most importantly, originally did not have a cannon on the top platform. (The Guernsey round towers have a strong batter on the ground floor and no machicolations; they too initially did not carry a gun on the top platform.) Later, at the onset of the Napoleonic Wars, both the Jersey and Guernsey towers each received a 12-pounder carronade on a pivot mount for the top platform.

During the German occupation of the Channel Islands during World War II, the Germans adapted some of the towers to their own purposes. The Germans also destroyed several towers.

Some of the surviving towers have been painted on the seaward side to serve as daymarks (navigational aids). Archirondel is painted red and white, while other towers are painted white and red, or white, in whole or in part, again, on the seaward side. The order below is counter-clockwise from the north-west corner of the island.

Tower	Year started	Parish	Way-point	Notes
Grève de Lecq Tower	1780	Saint Mary	49.2459°N 2.2010°W	This is the only Conway tower on the north coast. Unusually, it stands some 100 metres inland. The Germans altered it substantially during World War II.
St Ouen No. 3 or D (High Tower)	1796	Saint Ouen		The German forces destroyed the tower during their occupation of Jersey
La Rocco Tower	1796	Saint Ouen	49.1984°N 2.2344°W	Stands on a tidal island off the west coast. On 14 May 1801, the States officially named it Gordon's Tower, in honour of then Lieutenant-Governor, Lieutenant-General Andrew Gordon, but that name has since lapsed. This was the last of the round towers to be built. Like Archirondel tower, it has a gun platform at its base.
St Ouen C				Destroyed, probably by the sea, between 1849 and 1933.
St Ouen B				a.k.a. Tour de la Pierre Buttée. Destroyed, probably by the sea, between 1849 and 1933.
St Ouen A				a.k.a. Tour du Sud. Damaged by the sea, it was finally destroyed by artillery fire in 1851.
St Brelade No. 2		Saint Brélade	49.1844°N 2.1923°W	Privately owned
Ouaisné Tower	<1787	Saint Brélade	49.1797°N 2.1852°W	a.k.a. La Tour du Hoinet or St Brelade No. 1
Beaumont Tower	<1787	Saint Peter	49.1961°N 2.1581°W	a.k.a. St Aubin's Third Tower
Second Tower				a.k.a. Bel Royal Tower or St Aubin's 2nd Tower; German forces destroyed it on 7 January 1943, to make way for a bunker built into the seawall.
First Tower		Saint Helier	49.1945°N 2.1285°W	This was the first tower built in Saint Aubin's Bay. The States bought the tower from the Crown in 1896. At one time it had a cistern and a windmill on top to provide water for the plants along Victoria Avenue. More recently it acts as a sewer vent for an adjacent pumping station.
Le Hocq Tower	1781	St Clement	49.1668°N 2.0618°W	Completed after the French attack and Battle of Jersey
Platte Rocque Tower	1781	Grouville	49.1643°N 2.0340°W	Built close to where the French landed earlier in 1781. The German occupying forces used the area as a Widerstandsnest (resistance point). The tower is now privately owned.
Seymour Tower	1782	Grouville	49.1576°N 2.0078°W	Located on L'Avarison, a tidal islet two kilometers (1.25 miles) east of La Rocque
La Rocque Tower		Grouville	49.1679°N 2.0286°W	a.k.a. Grouville No. 1. Now privately owned and has a house built around it.
Keppel Tower		Grouville	49.1710°N 2.0302°W	a.k.a. Grouville No. 2. Now privately owned and has a house built around it.
Le Hurel Tower		Grouville	49.1740°N 2.0310°W	a.k.a. Grouville No. 3. Now privately owned and has a house built around it.
Fauvic Tower		Grouville	49.1769°N 2.0320°W	a.k.a. Grouville No. 4. Now privately owned and has a house built around it.
Grouville No. 5		Grouville	49.1796°N 2.0332°W	Privately owned, but not altered.
Grouville No. 8		Grouville		Destroyed, possibly to make way for the construction of a railway station at Gorey village. The reason the tower was numbered No. 8 is that Fort Henry and Fort William stood between it and Grouville No. 5, making the tower the eighth fortification in the sequence.
Archirondel Tower	1793	Saint Martin	49.2120°N 2.0236°W	Built on La Roche Rondel, which was originally a tidal island. A causeway, which was to be part of a breakwater that would form the southern arm of an enhanced St Catherine's harbour, now connects the tower to the shore. The tower had a gun platform at its base. It also has three larger machicolations rather than the four of the other towers.
St Catherine's Tower		Saint Martin	49.2182°N 2.0297°W	a.k.a. "The White Tower", because it is painted white on its seaward side. It stands on the other side of the slipway from an RNLI lifeboat station.
Fliquet Tower	<1787	Saint Martin	49.2279°N 2.0243°W	a.k.a. Telegraph tower because a telegraph cable from Pirou on the French coast made landfall at the tower; at that time "Telegraph" was painted on the tower in black, surmounted with a green disk. At some point the tower had its top floor and machicolations removed. It is privately owned.

==== Numismatics ====
The latest Jersey pound note design (2010) has a picture of the St Clement's tower at Le Hocq. This tower also appears on the reverse of the Jersey 1p coin.

=== Martello towers ===
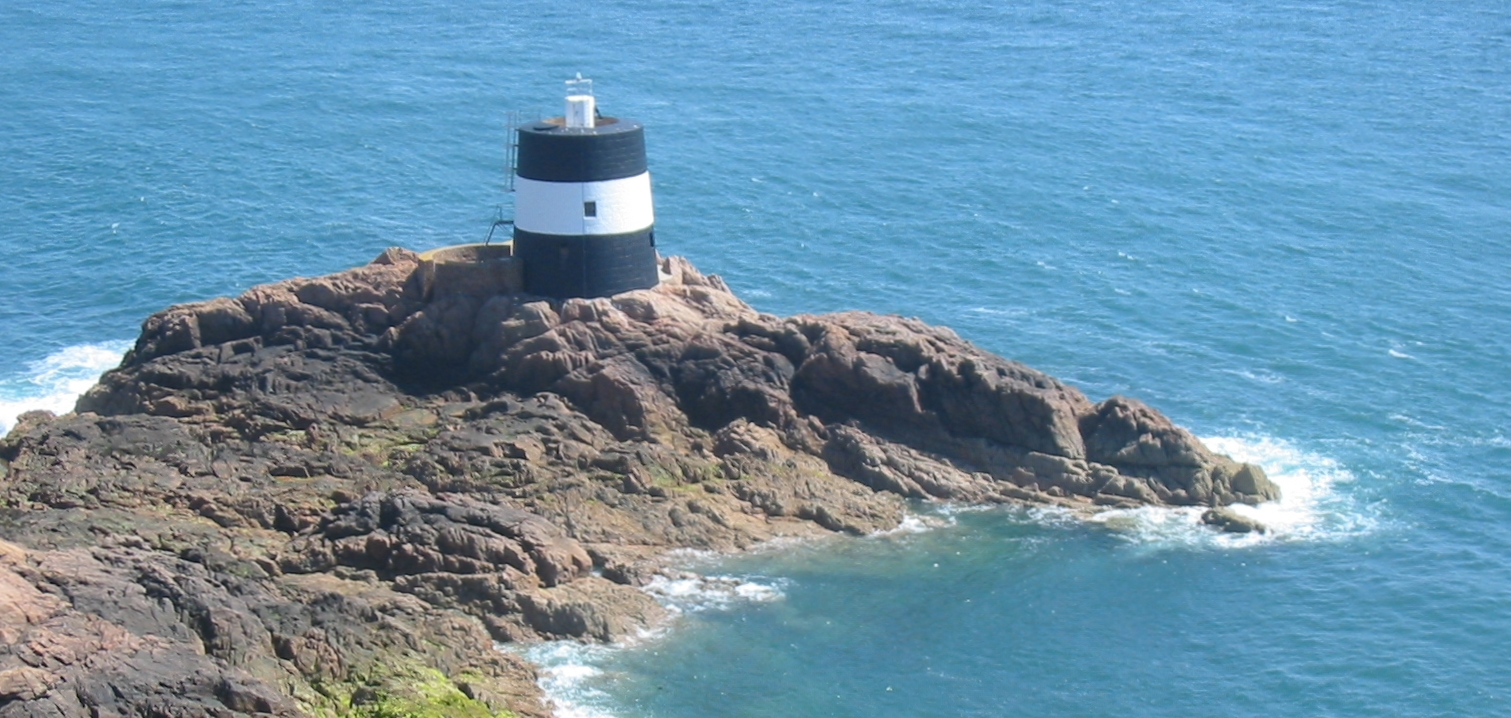
La Tour de Vinde, Saint Brélade, Jersey

The British built eight true Martello towers in Jersey, three between 1808 and 1814, and five between 1834 and 1837. The German occupation forces destroyed one of the second group, L'Etacq, during World War II.

Tower	Year started	Parish	Way-point	Notes
Portelet Tower	1807	Saint Brélade	49.1699°N 2.1776°W	The tower is located on the tidal islet L'Île au Guerdain.
La Tour de Vinde	1808	Saint Brélade	49.1651°N 2.1681°W	The tower stands at the foot of the cliffs of Noirmont Point, under the guns of the German World War II Battery Lothringen.
Icho Tower	1810		49.1482°N 2.0482°W	Located on a tidal islet, 40 metres by 20, two kilometres from the shore.
L'Etacq	1832	Saint Ouen		Destroyed
La Collette Tower	1834	Saint Helier	49.1746°N 2.1079°W	a.k.a. Pointe des Pas, linked between Fort Regent and Elizabeth Castle, and also protected the approach to St Helier Harbour and the coastline eastwards from Havre des Pas. It was absorbed into the 19th century artificers' barracks and workshops.
Kempt Tower	1834	Saint Ouen	49.2211°N 2.2275°W	Currently, Kempt Tower serves as the interpretation centre for Les Mielles conservation area.
Lewis Tower	1835	Saint Ouen	49.2297°N 2.2346°W	
Victoria Tower	1837	Saint Martin	49.2025°N 2.0209°W	Built to protect Mont Orgueil from landward attacks. Now owned by the National Trust for Jersey

=== Coastal batteries, magazines and guardhouses ===
- La Tour Cârrée
- Le Couperon guardhouse
- Le Don Hilton
- Plémont guardhouse. The British built the guardhouse in the 18th century, and by 1812, it had a battery associated with it that was armed with an 18-pounder muzzle-loading gun. During the German occupation, the Germans made a "reinforced field position" of the guardhouse. They added an emplacement with twin machine guns, a mortar emplacement, an observation post, and a searchlight shelter with railroad tracks linking it to twin operating sites. They also added a "Tobruk" with a tank turret atop it.

== World War II coastal fortifications ==
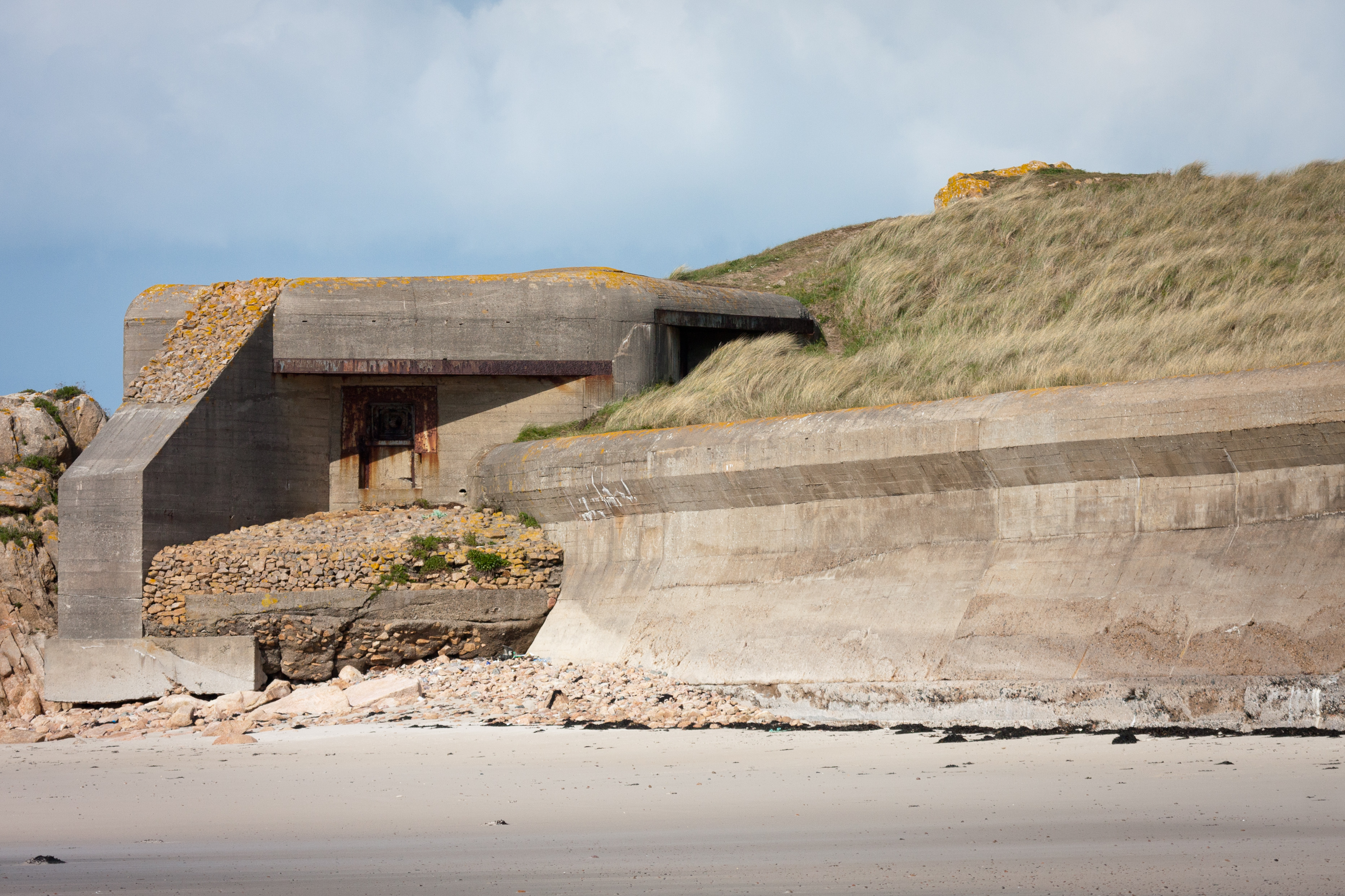
Casemate gun emplacement and anti-tank wall in Saint Ouen's Bay

During World War II, Nazi Germany constructed a considerable number of fortifications in the Channel Islands which form part of the Atlantic Wall. The Channel Islands were amongst the most heavily fortified parts of the Atlantic Wall, particularly Alderney which is the island closest to France. In Jersey, the fortifications include Hohlgangsanlage tunnels and artillery batteries such as Battery Moltke and Battery Lothringen.

The most distinctive new structures the Germans built were the Marine Peilstand (MP) towers that they used to search for targets at sea. The Germans had intended to build nine towers, but only completed three. These towers are round and have five or more floors with observation embrasures, as well as defensive embrasures. MP1 is part of Battery Lothringen, MP2 overlooks Corbière lighthouse and is now known as the Radio Tower, and MP3 is part of Battery Moltke. The design of the towers inadvertently and somewhat ironically reflect the Bauhaus movement of Modernist architecture (1919-1933), a movement that the Nazis had tried to suppress.

As well as building many new fortifications, the German forces made their own additions to some of the existing fortifications. These additions include gun emplacements and various types of bunkers.

Organisation Todt built the fortifications using imported labour, primarily prisoners of war and workers deported from occupied countries. The Germans transported over 16,000 slave workers to the Channel Islands to build the fortifications.

Structure(s)	Year(s) started	Location(s)	Way-point	Notes
Battery Lothringen	1941	Saint Brélade	49.1651°N 2.1681°W	Noirmont headland, the Command Bunker and the Marine Peilstand is opened to the public by the CIOS
Battery Moltke	1941	Saint Ouen	49.2479°N 2.2512°W	Large site spread across the Les Landes headland, one bunker is open to the public
Hohlgangsanlagen	1941	Various parishes	N/A	Multiple tunnels around the island, Ho8 is a museum
10.5cm Jäger Casemate	1941	Various parishes	Corbiere, Museum: 49.18036°N 2.24585°W	Multiple casemates around Jersey's coastline, 4 are open to the public, one at Corbiere is opened by the CIOS and is a museum, another in St. Ouens bay is open as a museum though it lacks its gun, and 2 unrestored examples are at Elizabeth Castle.
4.7cm Festung Pak 36 (t) Casemate	1941	Various parishes	N/A	Multiple casemates often incorporated into the sea wall, a well-preserved example at Millbrook is opened as a museum by the CIOS
Sechsschartentürme	1941	Various parishes	Museum: 49.212989°N 2.212072°W	Multiple Sechsschartentürme (Six-loophole turrets) around the island; one well-preserved example is open as a museum. Another at Corbiere is also a museum although its turret has been removed.

== See also ==
- History of Jersey
