= Progress Party (Jersey) =

Political party in Jersey

- Leader: Steve Pallett
- Founded: 29 January 2021
- Dissolved: 7 July 2023
- Political position: Centre to centre-right
- Colours: Red

Website
- theprogressparty.je

The Progress Party was a centrist, big tent party in Jersey, formed in 2021 to compete for the 2022 Jersey general election. Senator Steve Pallett lead the party, which included Deputy Steve Luce and former Deputy Eddie Noel.

Its policies included a points-based immigration system, the construction of a new hospital in Jersey, and a review of publicly owned property on the island for the purpose of building or repurposing existing buildings on said property for affordable housing. In April 2022, the Progress Party entered into a political pact with the Jersey Liberal Conservatives Party. The two parties agreed to promote a joint manifesto and candidates as well as advocating Liberal Conservative leader Philip Bailhache for the role of Chief Minister.

Due to underwhelming performance in the 2022 election, which saw the Progress Party leader Steve Pallet voted out of office, the party was disbanded in July 2023, with the party's last remaining member sitting as an independent.

== Electoral performance ==
States Assembly
Election	Leader	Votes		Seats			Position	Government
Election	Leader	No.	Share	No.	±	Share	Position	Government
2022	Steve Pallet	4,376	4.2	1 / 49	▼1 (Note: 2 sitting members of the States Assembly had joined the Progress Party before the 2022 election, making it the party with the third most seats before the election.)	2.0	3rd	Independent–Better Way

== See also ==
- Political parties in Jersey
- Politics of Jersey
- Constitution of Jersey
