= 2010 Jersey by-elections =

A by-election for Senator for the States Assembly of Jersey was held on 16 June 2010, after Stuart Syvret lost his seat in the house after being absent from Jersey.

Candidate	Votes	%
Francis Le Gresley	5,798	37.61
Stuart Syvret	3,437	22.29
Patrick J. D. Ryan	3,212	20.83
Gerard Baudains	1,329	8.62
Geoff Southern	1,085	7.04
Nicholas Le Cornu	382	2.48
Gino Risoli	76	0.49
Philip Maguire	72	0.47
Peter Remon-Whorral	27	0.18
Total	15,418	100.00
Registered voters/turnout		26.51
