= Louisa Journeaux =

Jersey resident rescued and taken to Canada

Louisa Journeaux (8 February 1864 – August 30, 1939) born Elder Cottage, St. Clement's Road, in the parish of St. Clement on the island of Jersey, was lost at sea and presumed dead until she turned up at Newfoundland, Canada. The crew of the ship Curlew had spotted her and took her on board to continue their cross-Atlantic voyage to Newfoundland.

On April 18, 1886, Journeaux and her cousin Julia Wiltshire had attended an Evensong at the Church of England chapel at Saint Helier when leaving met two Frenchmen, a Jules Farné and M.G. Radiguet. The four had rented two boats to enjoy a pleasant row in the moonlit night when Farné had lost the oar and jumped in to retrieve it and eventually lost sight of Journeaux, who was left on the row-boat. Amidst the shouts of anguish, the owner of the boats had found Farné clinging to a pier with no sign of the boat in sight. A search party was formed to find Journeaux to no avail.

On April 19 when a tugboat sent out to find Journeaux returned without her, Farné was arrested by Centenier Le Gros and tried on the charge of neglect and imprudence which caused the death or disappearance of Louisa Journeaux. The trial could not convict Farne of anything and the charges were dropped. Sensing the hostility of the islanders, he had left for Paris.

The community feared the worst that Journeaux was dead when a telegram reached her father from the Colonial Secretary for the government of Newfoundland. It read:

Daughter Louisa picked up near England and landed at St. George's Bay. Quite well.

Journeaux was transported from St. George's Bay back to St. John's on Bowring's vessel Curlew, upon which she was given freedom of their dry goods and clothing store. She was left in the care of Archdeacon Botwood and was also received at Government House by His Excellency Sir William Des Vœux and his lady. On June 2, 1886, she left aboard the ship Siberian for Liverpool and to greet her parents. From there she left on the Brittany to Saint Helier harbour, where she was greeted by a waiting crowd of well-wishers. Journeaux's journey lasted fifty-five days to arrive at the same pier she had left for a leisure row with her cousin and two Frenchmen. Farné was never heard from again but was eventually exonerated by Journeaux's letter she wrote back to home while she was in Newfoundland awaiting transportation back home. Journeaux married a Londoner by the name of Wyse. She died on August 30, 1939.

We had returned to a point between the two pierheads, Victoria and Albert, when Jules Farné, who was still rowing, lost an oar; in order to recover it, he turned the boat with the other, and, in so doing, that oar also slipped from his hands. At this time the tide was running out very fast, and the two oars were soon swept away from the boat.
Jules Farne then jumped out of the boat to swim after them, telling me he was a good swimmer. In the course of a minute or so, he got into the boat again, nearly turning her over in doing so; he got in at the other side and took off his hat, deposited it in the boat, and jumped into the sea a second time.
He then struck out towards the Pier to get the oars... in a short space of one or two minutes I had lost sight of the swimmer. When I heard his first cry for help I was greatly alarmed. I cried for help myself, shrieking as loudly as I could. I continued shrieking until I became quite fatigued. About midnight it grew cloudy and rather dark. An hour or so later it began to rain heavily, and continued raining until about daylight, I was quickly wet through.
Sometime early on Monday morning I found that the boat had a considerable quantity of water in it. I baled it out with Farne's hat, made of hard felt, and this I did until I was rescued. About 7:30 or 8 on Monday morning, I saw a steamer which I took to be a Southampton boat from Jersey, and it was going in the opposite direction to me. On Monday night there were a few showers of rain.
Early on Tuesday morning I saw a sail coming towards me as from France.... and my spirits began to revive: At length I was, as I hoped, near enough for the sailors to see my signal, and so I made one with my pocket handkerchief, waving it to and fro. She turned out to be the Tombold of St. Malo, commanded by Captain Edouard Landgren. I remained in the hospitable ship for 26 days, when the captain landed me at St. George's Bay, Newfoundland, 2,300 miles from Jersey. They tried to land me first at St. Pierre-Miquelon, but the fog being too thick to permit them doing so, they went some distance out of their way and landed me at St. George's. I arrived at St. John's, Newfoundland, by steamer Curlew after a run of four days from St. George's. At St. Mary's church in St. John's, I had the happy opportunity of returning my thanks to Almighty God... and my gratitude to Him was and is all the warmer from the fact that some hours after my rescue the weather became very stormy, and three weeks afterwards during the storm a seaman slipped from a yard into the sea and was lost.
Journeaux letter British Press and Jersey Times, June 11, 1886.
