= David Warr =

Jersey politician

Deputy David Warr
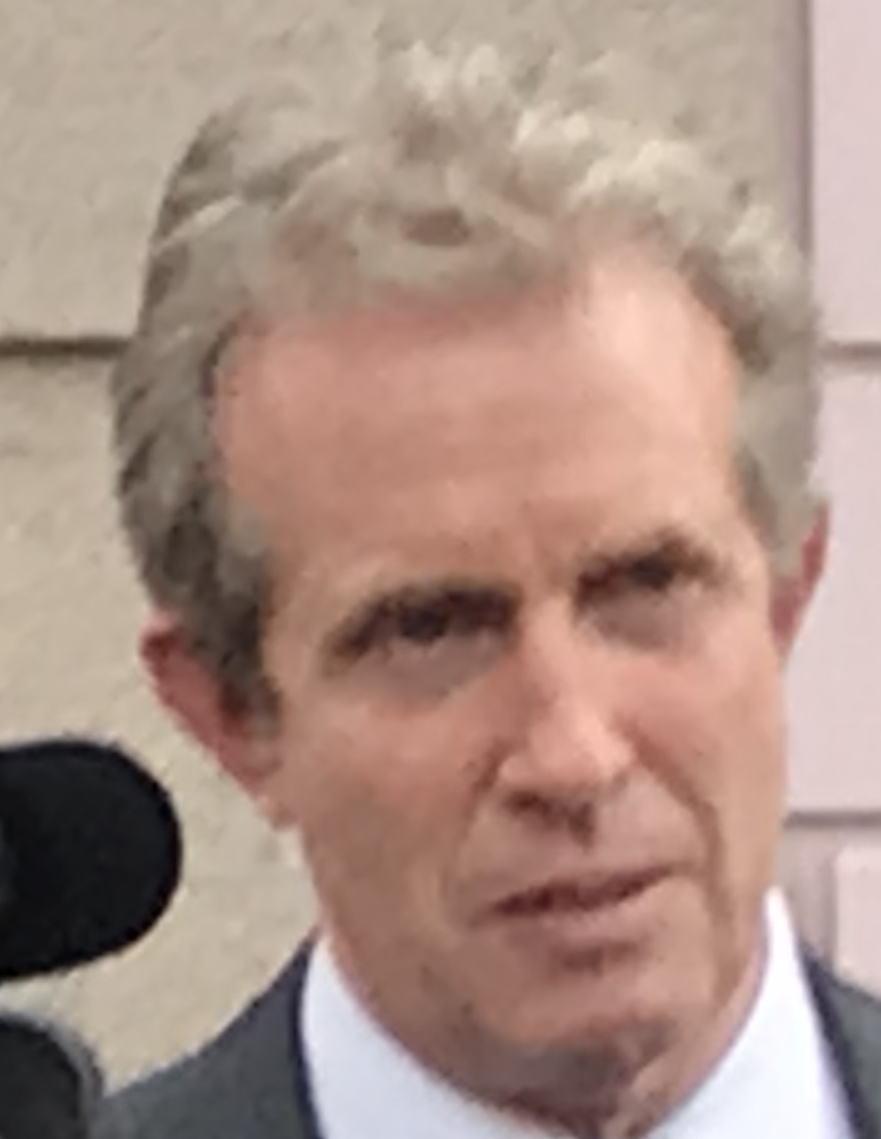
- Warr in 2024

Deputy of St Helier South
- Incumbent
- Assumed office 27 June 2022
- Serving with: Sam Mézec; Tom Coles; Beatriz Porée
- Majority: 25

Minister for Housing and Communities
- In office 11 July 2022 – 30 January 2024
- Chief Minister: Kristina Moore
- Preceded by: Russell Labey
- Succeeded by: Sam Mézec

Personal details
- Party: Better Way
- Spouse: Pam Warr
- Children: 2

David James Warr is a former Jersey politician. He was as a deputy in the States Assembly from 2022 to 2026 and served as Minister for Housing and Communities from July 2022 to January 2024.

== Political career ==
Warr stood for election as deputy of St Helier South in the 2022 general election under the Better Way banner. He was elected by a margin of 25 votes over the next-placed unsuccessful candidate, the narrowest margin of any successful candidate in the election.

Warr supported Kristina Moore in the 2022 Chief Minister of Jersey election, and was subsequently appointed Minister for Housing and Communities in her Council of Ministers He remained in office until January 2024, when Moore ceased to be Chief Minister following a vote of confidence. Sam Mézec of Reform Jersey was subsequently appointed Minister for Housing and Communities in the new Council of Ministers.

As minister, Warr’s housing policy decisions attracted criticism from political opponents. In 2022, Reform Jersey criticised proposed appointments to a rent tribunal panel, arguing that the inclusion of landlords and finance professionals raised concerns about conflicts of interest. In 2023, Reform Jersey members also criticised Warr’s support for housing development on land next to Millennium Park in St Helier, arguing that it was inconsistent with his 2022 election commitments.

Warr stood for Connétable of St Helier at the 2026 general election and was not elected.
