= Francis Le Gresley =

Francis du Heaume Le Gresley MBE
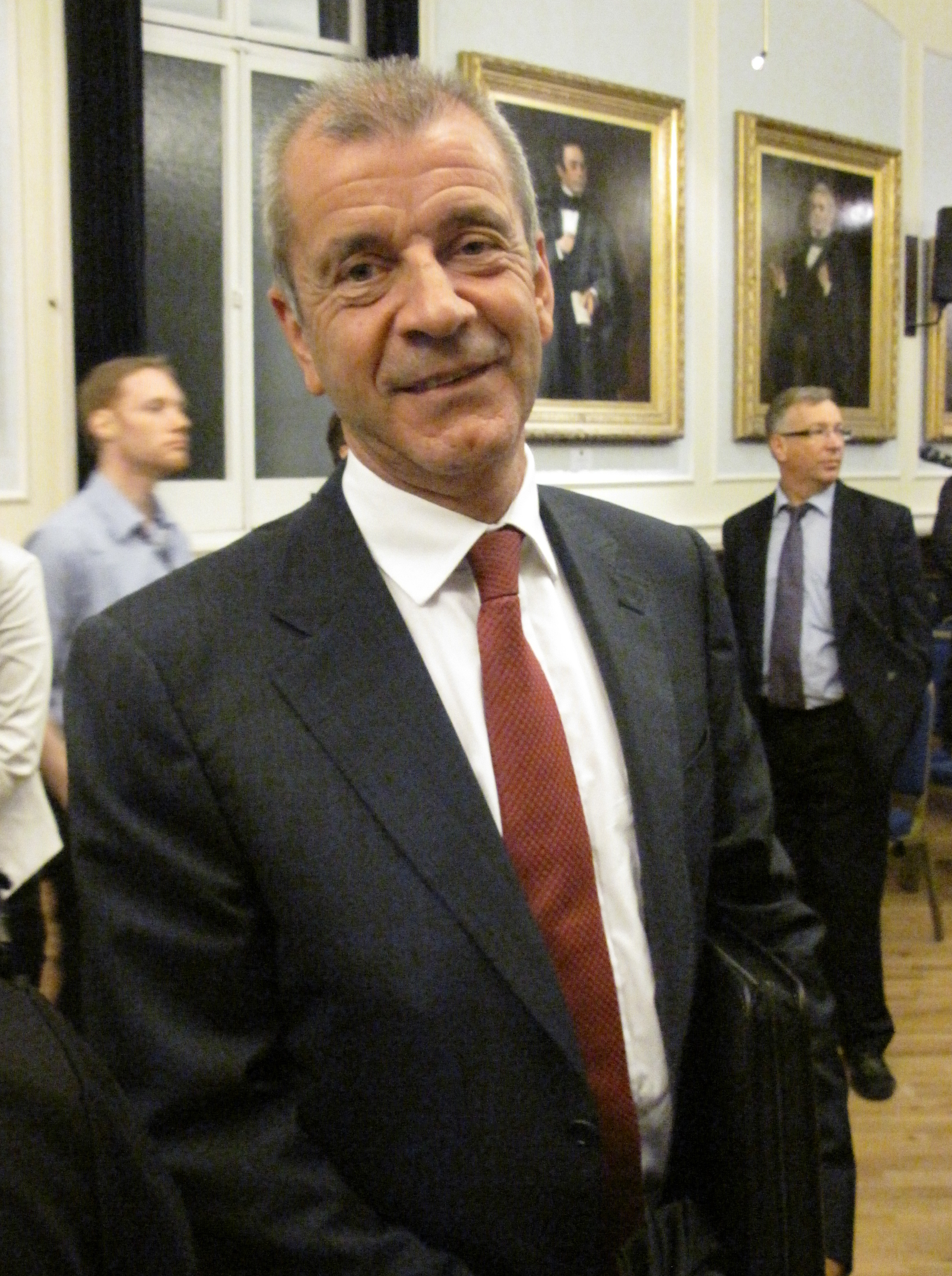
- Le Gresley in 2011

Minister for Social Security
- In office 2011–2014
- Preceded by: Ian Gorst
- Succeeded by: Susan Pinel

Senator in the States of Jersey
- In office 18 June 2010 – 2014

Francis du Heaume Le Gresley, MBE is a Jersey politician. He was a member of the States of Jersey between 2010 and 2014, after being first elected in the Jersey by-election of 2010. Prior to his political career he was the manager of the Citizens Advice Bureau in Jersey. He was the Minister for Social Security until 2014.

== Political career ==
Le Gresley first stood for election in June 2010, in a by-election for one seat, against eight other candidates including former-Senator Stuart Syvret, and Deputy Geoff Southern. Le Gresley topped the poll with 5,798 votes. The following year he held on to his seat, in the Jersey general election of 2011, receiving 14,891 votes.

=== Pharmacies ===
In April 2013, Le Gresley announce a change in the fees paid to local pharmacies by Jersey's Health Insurance Fund. A higher rate of £3.40 would be paid on the first 50,000 items dispensed in a year, starting on 1 May 2013. He said this would help smaller pharmacies become "more viable". The estimated additional cost would be around £600,000.

== See also ==
- Council of Ministers of Jersey
