= Mark Boleat =

British politician

Sir Mark John Boleat (born January 1949) is a Jersey politician, former financial services trade body executive, and former City of London Corporation office-holder. He was elected as a Senator in the States Assembly at the 2026 Jersey general election.

He was a common councilman for the Cordwainer ward of the City of London from 2002 to 2019, serving as chairman of the City of London Corporation's Policy and Resources Committee from 2012 to 2017.

== Biography ==
Boleat was born in January 1949 in Jersey. He studied for an economics degree at Lanchester College of Technology followed by a master's degree in economic policy at the University of Reading. Boleat was knighted in the 2017 Birthday Honours for services to financial services and local government.

=== Career in the United Kingdom ===
During the 1980s and 1990s, Boleat lead several trade bodies, including the Building Societies Association, the Council of Mortgage Lenders and the Association of British Insurers.

He was a common councilman for the Cordwainer ward of the City of London from 2002 to 2019. From 2012 to 2017, he was chairman of the Policy and Resources Committee. The role is one of the Corporation’s senior political positions.

=== Career in Jersey ===
Boleat served as chair of the Jersey Development Company, Andium Homes, the Jersey Competition and Regulatory Authority, and the Guernsey Competition and Regulatory Authority.

In 2023, he became a senior advisor in the Policy Centre Jersey, an independent think tank.

In the 2022 Jersey election, Boleat ran in the St Clement electoral district as leader of Jersey Alliance. He polled last place out of 7 candidates and was unelected. The party gained only one seat in the States Assembly, and their sole member resigned from the party several weeks later. The party was dissolved in November 2024.

In the 2026 general election, he stood successfully as an independent candidate for one of the nine Senatorial seats.

Political offices
Preceded by Stuart Fraser	Chair of the Policy and Resources Committee; City of London Corporation; May 2012 – 2017	Succeeded by Catherine McGuinness
