= Beatriz Porée =

Jersey politician

Deputy Beatriz Porée
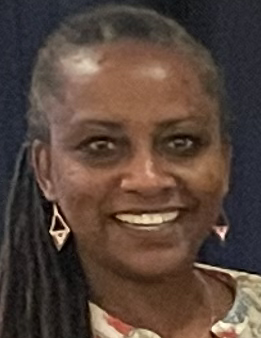
- Porée in 2024

Deputy of St Helier South
- Incumbent
- Assumed office 27 June 2022
- Serving with: Sam Mézec; Tom Coles; David Warr
- Majority: 88

Personal details
- Born: 1966 or 1967 (age 58–59) Angola
- Party: Reform Jersey
- Known for: Being the first person of colour to serve as a member of the States Assembly

Beatriz Borges de Sousa Vaz Moreno Porée is a Jersey politician who has served as Deputy for St Helier South since 2022.

Porée was born in Angola, but was raised in Portugal after becoming a child refugee in the Angolan Civil War. She moved to Jersey in the late 1980s and founded a juice bar business in the Central Market. Porée successfully ran for election in the 2022 general election as a Reform Jersey candidate in St Helier South, becoming the first person of colour and second person of Portuguese descent to be elected to the States Assembly.
