= Seymour Tower =

Coastal defence tower in Jersey

- L'Avarison, Jersey
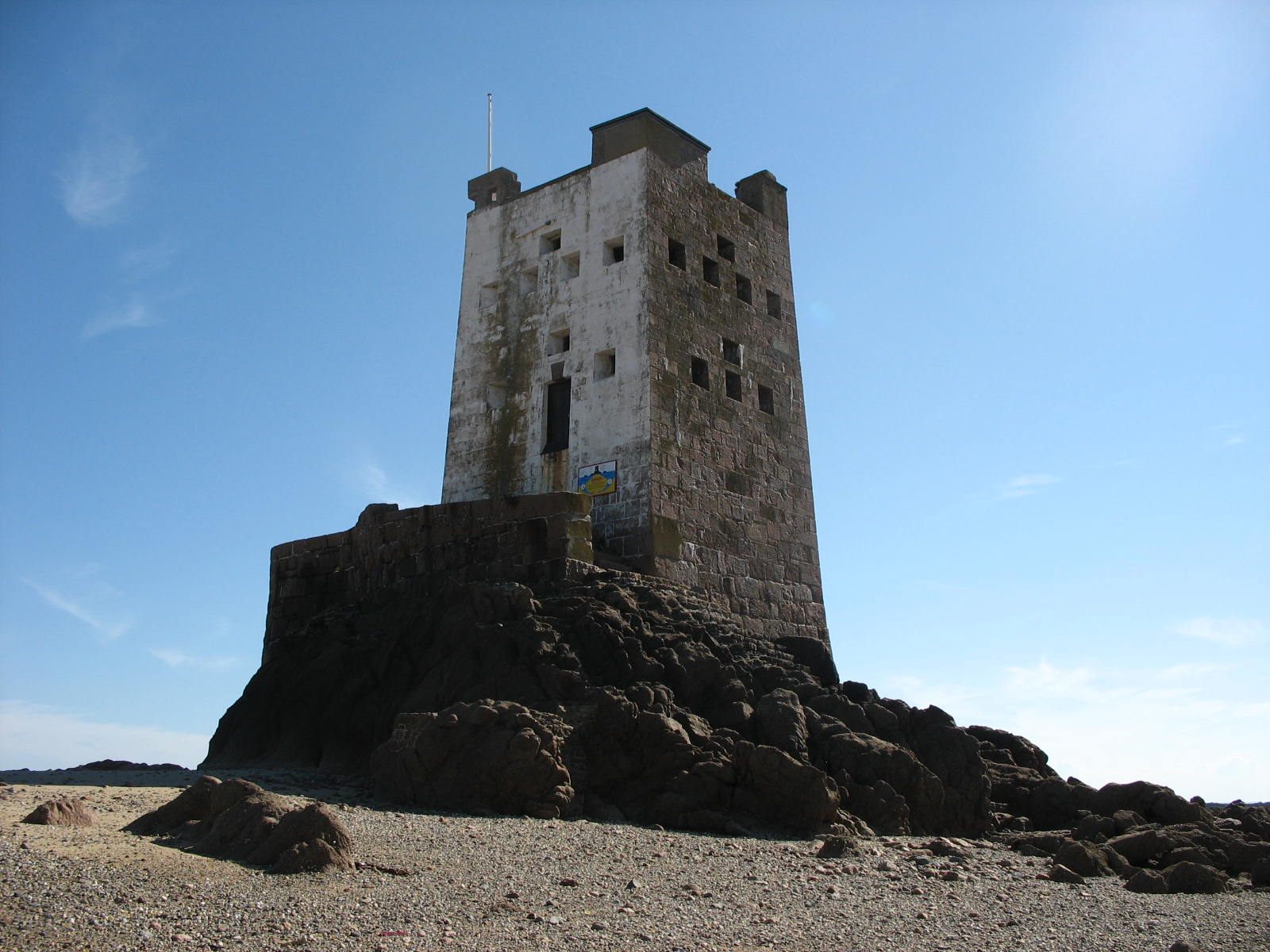

Site information
- Owner: States of Jersey
- Condition: Intact

Location
- Coordinates: 49°09′27″N 2°00′28″W

Site history
- Built: 1782
- Built by: Sir Henry Seymour Conway

Garrison information
- Garrison: Jersey Militia East Division

Seymour Tower is a coastal defence tower built on a rocky tidal island called L'Avarison, located 2 km (1.25 miles) east of the shoreline of Jersey, an area included in Jersey's southeast coast Ramsar site. Acquired by Jersey Heritage in 2006, it has since been used for self-catering accommodation.

== History ==
Seymour tower was one of 30 coastal towers that Field Marshall Henry Seymour Conway, Commander-in-Chief of the Forces (1782-93), ordered to be built around the island following the French defeat at the Battle of Jersey (6 January 1781). Construction began in 1782. Although 30 were planned, only 23 towers were built. Seymour is the only one that is square-shaped rather than round. A 1860 memorandum from Colonel Le Couter declared that Seymour Tower and Icho Tower to south were to be abandoned by the British military.

After a long period of vacancy, the States of Jersey purchased the tower in 1923 for £120 and it was subsequently released to private tenants. Jersey Heritage acquired the tower in 2006 and uses it for self-catering accommodation. In 2012 the tower and surrounding area featured in "The Riddle of the Tides", an episode of the BBC documentary Coast.

In May 2022, the tower served as the base for an archaeological survey of the Violet Bank, an intertidal reef, of which some 10 km^{2} (3.9 sq mi) is exposed during the low spring tide. The team of archaeologists, led by Dr Matthew Pope of UCL's Institute of Archaeology, in collaboration with Jersey Heritage, began to document more evidence of Neanderthal activity in this landscape. This work complements research carried out at La Cotte de St Brelade, on the southwest coast of Jersey which showed that Neanderthals had lived there between 250,000 and 50,000 years ago.

== See also ==
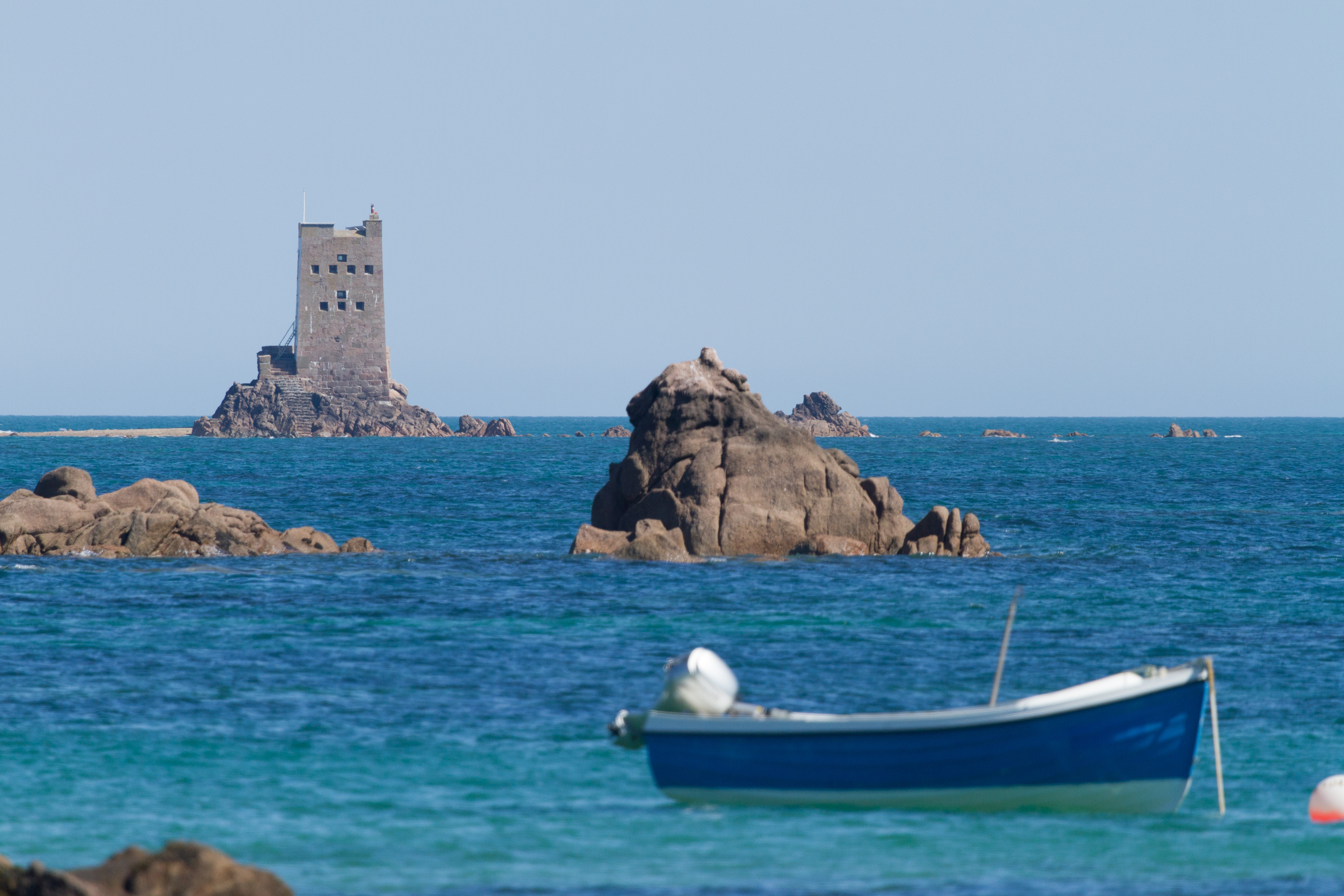
View from a distance

- Coastal fortifications of Jersey
