= Tom Coles =

Jersey politician

Deputy Tom Coles

Deputy of St Helier South
- Incumbent
- Assumed office 27 June 2022 Serving with Sam Mézec, Beatriz Porée, David Warr
- Chief Minister: Kristina Moore (2022-2024) Lyndon Farnham (2024-)
- Majority: 122

Personal details
- Born: 1981 or 1982 (age 43–44) Jersey
- Party: Reform Jersey

Thomas Antony Coles is a Reform Jersey politician who has served as Deputy for St Helier South since 2022.

Coles was born in Jersey in the early 1980s, and attended Grainville School and Highlands College. He first stood for election in 2018 as the Reform candidate for deputy of St Saviour No. 3, but was unsuccessful. He stood for election again in 2022 as deputy for St Helier South, this time winning with a majority of 122 votes.

In 2024, Coles brought a proposition to the States Assembly to decriminalise the possession of cannabis for recreational use by November 2025. However, the proposition failed to pass by a single vote.
