= Le Hocq =

Area in Jersey, Channel Islands

Coordinates: 49.167°N 2.062°W

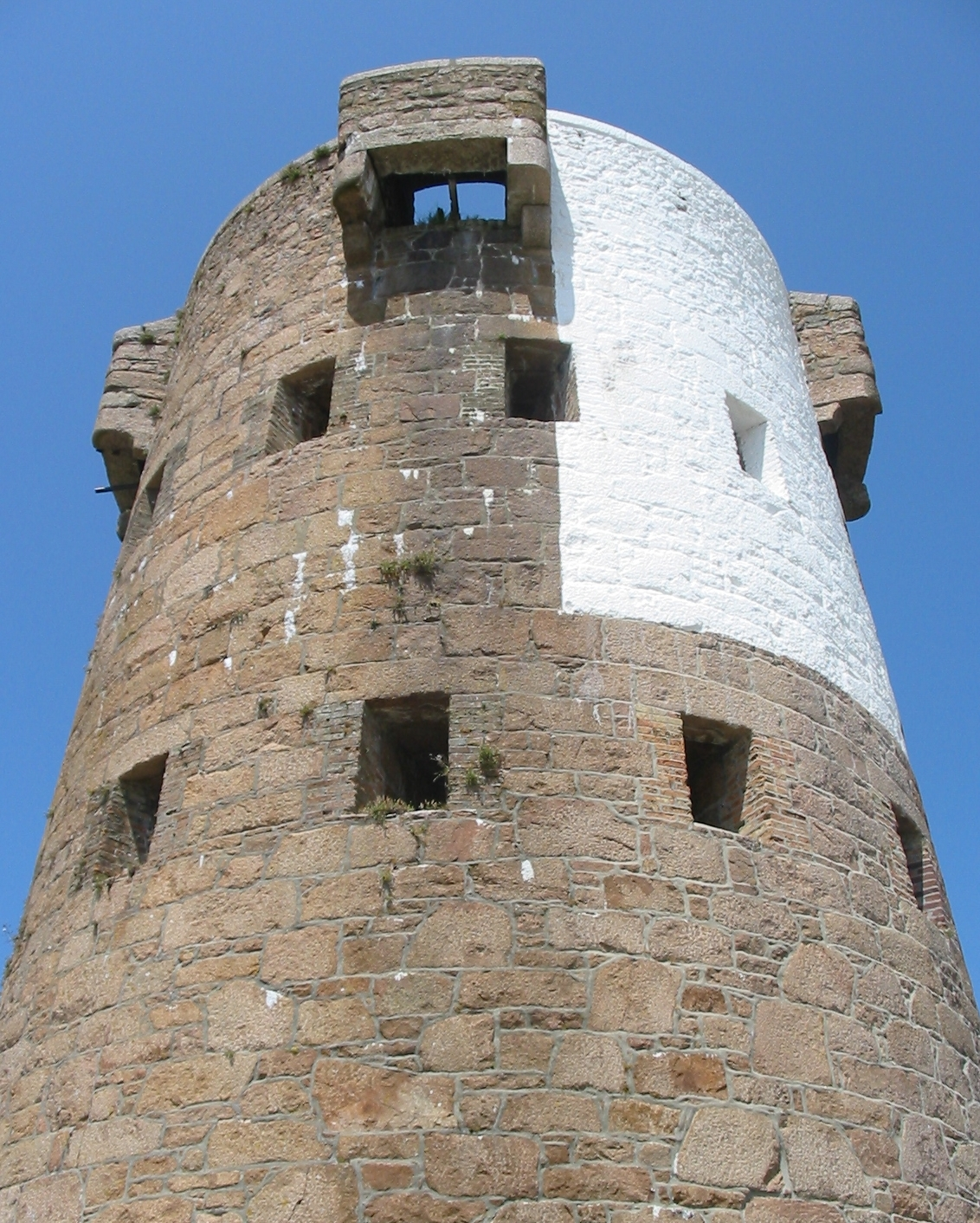
The Jersey Round Tower at Le Hocq is painted in a distinctive pattern to serve as a daymark for navigation

Le Hocq is an area in the parish of St. Clement, in the south-east of Jersey, Channel Islands. Le Hocq is a Jèrriais name, and means "the headland" or "the cape" in English.

The fortified Jersey Round Tower at Le Hocq was built in the 1780s.

Alongside the tower is the Millennium Cross of St. Clement, one of twelve granite wayside crosses erected to mark the millennium in 2000-2001.

The headland juts out onto the rocky Le Hocq Beach (a part of St. Clement's Bay). King's Rock, Queen's Rock and Prince's Rock are sizeable rocky outcrops which form a rough number 7 shape. The peaks of King's and Queen's Rock are vegetated - mostly grass and hardy small plants, and on all of these rocks are evidence of bird (likely seagull) settlement - eggshells and feathers have been found on Prince's Rock. All of these rocks are scalable, though with some difficulty, and should not be attempted unless you know what you are doing. King's Rock, the tallest, would not measure more than fifteen or twenty metres high.

The rest of the beach, stretching east, is sandy, but with many rockpools, with opportunities for winkle picking and shrimp catching close to the shore, and more serious fishing pursuits out at sea. Closer to land there are stony patches. Just below Le Hocq Tower, west of the groyne of boulders, is a more pleasant sandy beach, which stretches round the headland to a very stony stretch of beach which reaches as far as Rocqueberg (Witches' Rock) and La Motte (Green Island).

Behind the beach there is the common, broken in two by the slip which runs from la Grande Route de la Côte (the coast road) to the beach. On the slip are small boats, and a little refreshment kiosk.

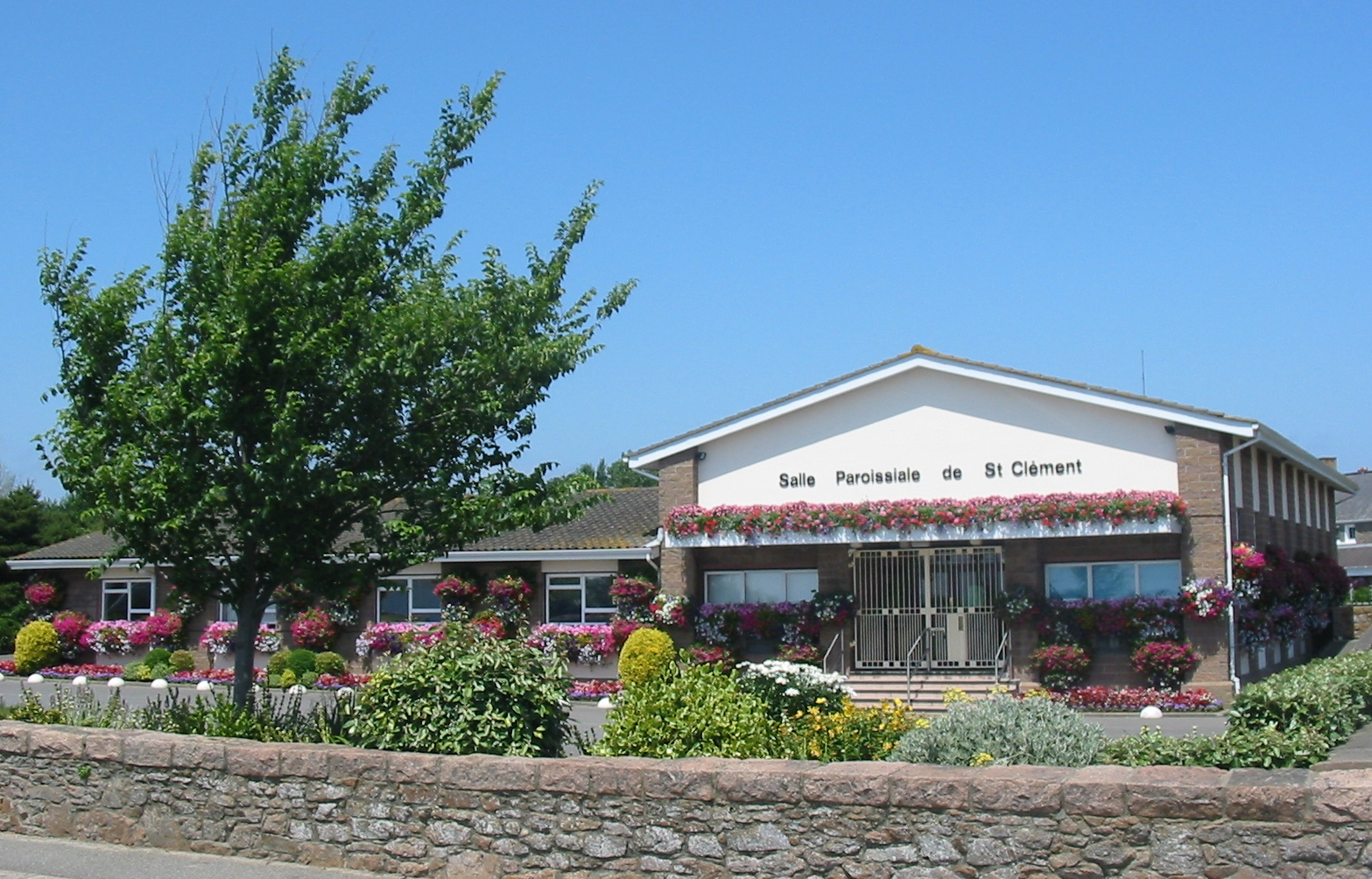
The parish hall of Saint Clement is the seat of municipal administration

Further inland is the parish hall (Salle Paroissiale) of St. Clement, and then a meadow featuring an original railway bridge from the days of the Jersey Railway, and a small brook which is unfortunately silted up for much of the year, before reaching Le Rocquier secondary school. Just across the road from the beach is Le Hocq Pub - open for drinks and meals all year round, and then La Rue du Hocq continues all the way up as far as the St. Clement inner road.

Le Hocq tower is depicted on the 2010 issue Jersey 1 pound note.
