= St Clement, Jersey =

Parish in south-eastern Jersey

Saint Clement Saint Cliément (Norman) Saint-Clément (French)
- Jersey parish
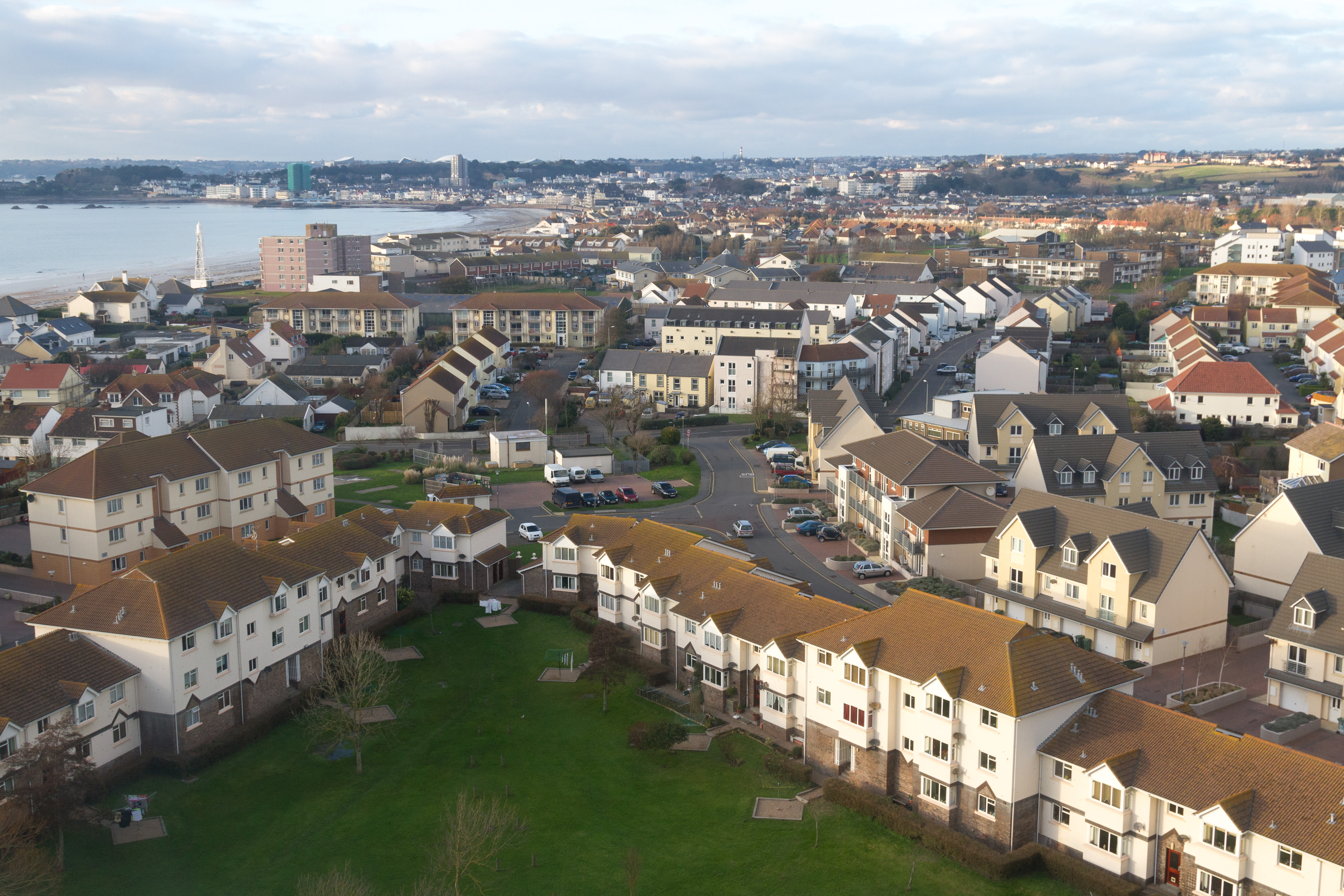
- A view over St. Clement towards St. Helier

- Flag Coat of arms

- Location of Saint Clement on Jersey
- Coordinates: 49.17037°N 2.07230°W
- Crown Dependency: Jersey, Channel Islands

Government
  - Connétable: Leonard Norman

Area
  - Total: 4.2 km^{2} (1.6 sq mi)
  - Rank: Ranked 12th

Population (2011)
  - Total: 9,221
  - Density: 2,200/km^{2} (5,700/sq mi)
- Time zone: GMT
  - Summer (DST): UTC+01
- Postcode district: JE2
- Postcode sector: 6
- Website: www.parish.gov.je/st_clement/

St Clement (Jèrriais: Saint Cliément) is one of the twelve parishes of Jersey, in the Channel Islands. Its parish hall is around 3.6 km (2.2 mi) south-east of St Helier. The parish has a population of 9,221 and is the second most densely populated on the island.

Located on the south-east coast of the island, stretching from Le Dicq in the west to near La Rocque in the east, it is the smallest paris, with a surface area of just 2,440 vergées (4 km^{2}).

The parish is largely suburbanised, with a large spread of post-war low-density housing development. There is no easily definable centre to the parish. The parish hall, schools and church are located in different areas. The parish is also home to a number of sports facilities, such as FB Fields and St Clement's Golf Club.

== Toponymy ==
In pre-Norman times, the area now known as St Clement was known as Petravilla or Pierreville. This is named for Peter, a monk who gave his lands in St Clement to the Mont Saint-Michel abbey.

The modern parish derives its name from its parish church, which is dedicated to St Clement, the third Pope in succession to St Peter. The church's full name is Saint Clement de Pierreville.

Samarès, its namesake manor, and now the name of a district of and a suburb located in St Clement, is a surname that is a corruption of the phrase "Salt marsh". It appeared in 1186 as Salmaresch.

== History ==
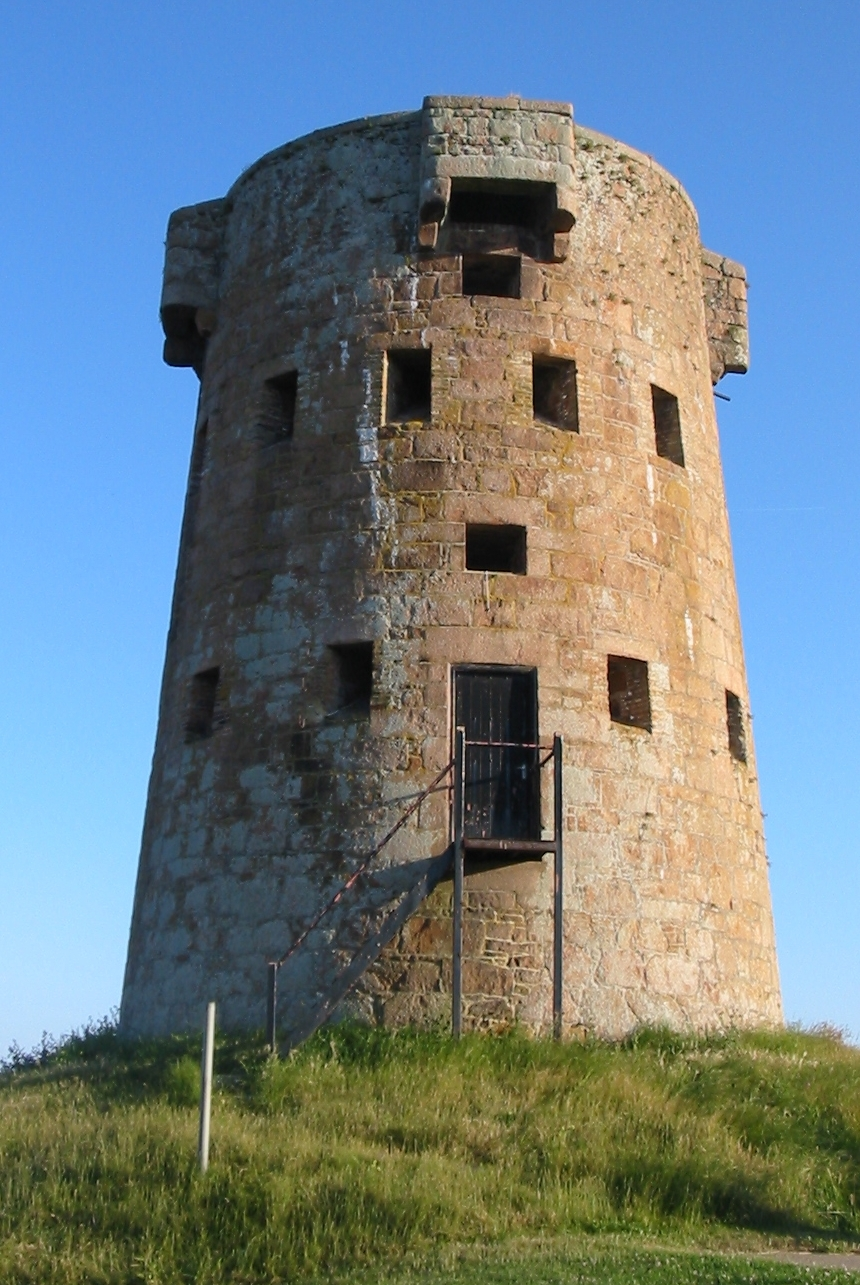
The round tower at Le Hocq is a prominent coastal landmark

Much of the parish lies below equinoctial high-tide level and was frequently flooded before Le Dicq was built to try to hold back the sea somewhat. There are remains of a submerged forest underneath the sand at Grève d'Azette that show how the parish has reduced in size as the sea has advanced. Large floods in 1688, 1796 and 1812 led to the coast road at Le Hocq being swept away by the sea; this necessitated the coast road being rebuilt further inland.

In 1172, it was recorded that a chapel existed in the parish and there was a priory on the site of the old Priory Inn; the site is now used for housing.

In the 16th and 17th centuries, the parish was believed to be the centre of a witch movement. According to beliefs, the rock at Rocque Berg (known as the Witches' Rock) was the focus for witchcraft in Jersey and witches would assemble there for their sabbats on Friday nights.

After the revocation of the Edict of Nantes in 1685, many French Protestants settled in the parish.s recorded on the church register.

In the mid 19th century, the town began to spread east from St Helier into the west of the parish. Today, there is relatively little open green space west of Samarès Lane into St Helier.

== Governance ==
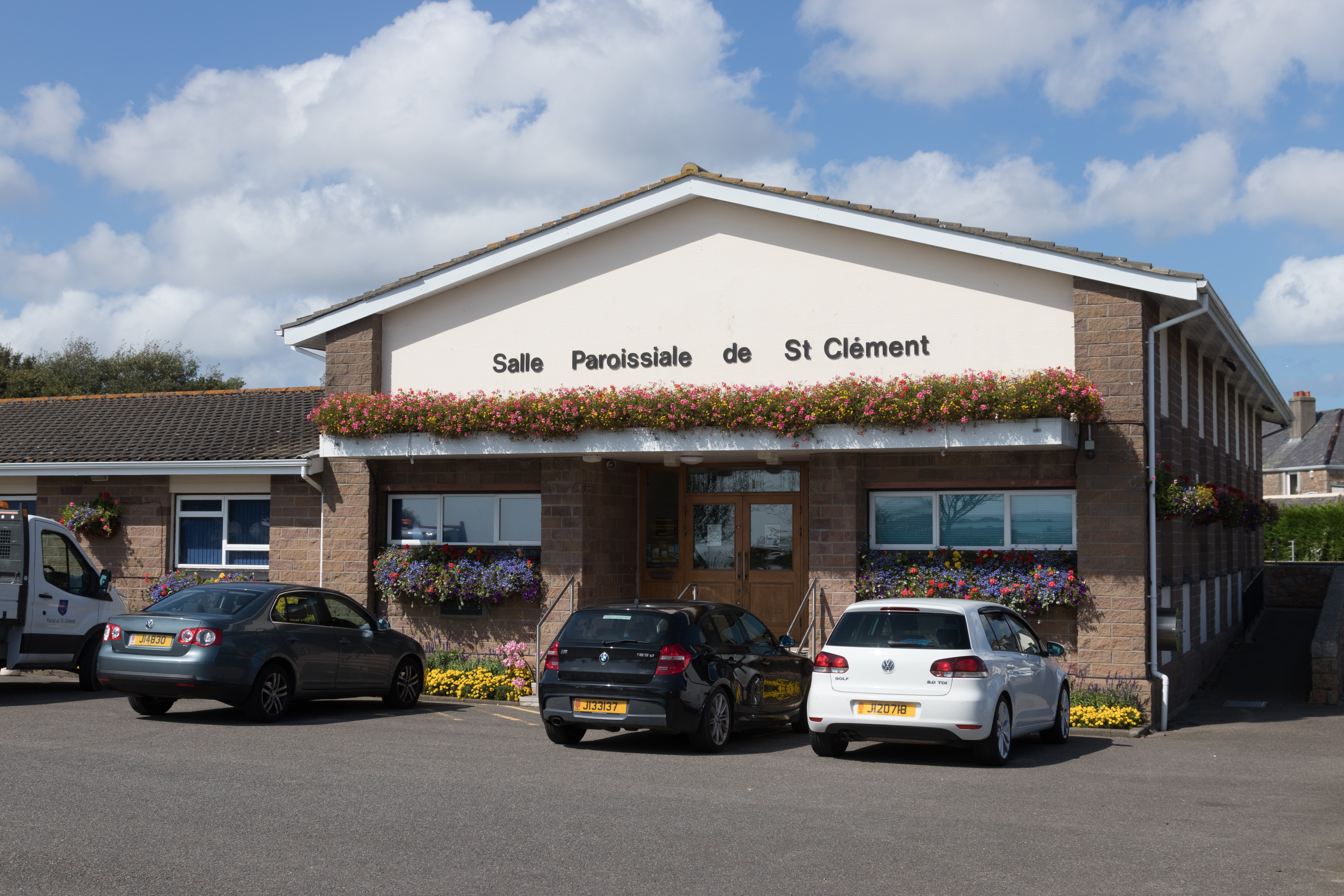
St Clement's Parish Hall at Le Hocq; it is the most modern of Jersey's parish halls

The parish is a first-level administrative division of the Bailiwick of Jersey, a British Crown dependency. The highest official in the parish is the Connétable of St Clement. The incumbent office holder is Len Norman, who has held the office since 2008, previously having been a St Clement Deputy since 1983.

At present, the parish forms one electoral district for States Assembly elections and elects two deputies, as well as eight senators in an islandwide constituency. The current deputies for St Clement are Lindsay Ash and Susie Pinel. Assistant treasury minister, Lindsay Ash, faced criticism in 2021 over a tweet mocking Oprah Winfrey's appearance following her interview with the Duke and Duchess of Sussex. He apologised if the comment caused any offence, but claimed the tweet was "observational comedy" and that he "would have mocked a man for his looks as well." Under the proposed electoral reform, St Clement will form a single constituency, electing four representatives alongside its Connétable.

St Clement also has its own local administration. This, like each of the other eleven parishes, is made up of a Connétable; two procureurs du bien public, who are also elected and oversee the finances of the parish; a rector, responsible for the parish church; members of the parish Honorary Police; (Note: Made up of centeniers, vingteniers and constable's officers.) and other officers such as churchwardens, roads inspectors, rates assessors and a registrar.

The parish is divided into three vingtaines for administrative purposes:

- La Grande Vingtaine
- La Vingtaine du Rocquier
- La Vingtaine de Samarès.

The seat of the parish administration is the Salle Paroissiale, or parish hall, which is pictured above and located at Le Hocq. This is the newest parish hall in the island; the previous parish hall in St Clement was located at Caldwell Hall, on La Grande Route de St Clément (St Clement's Inner Road).

== Geography ==
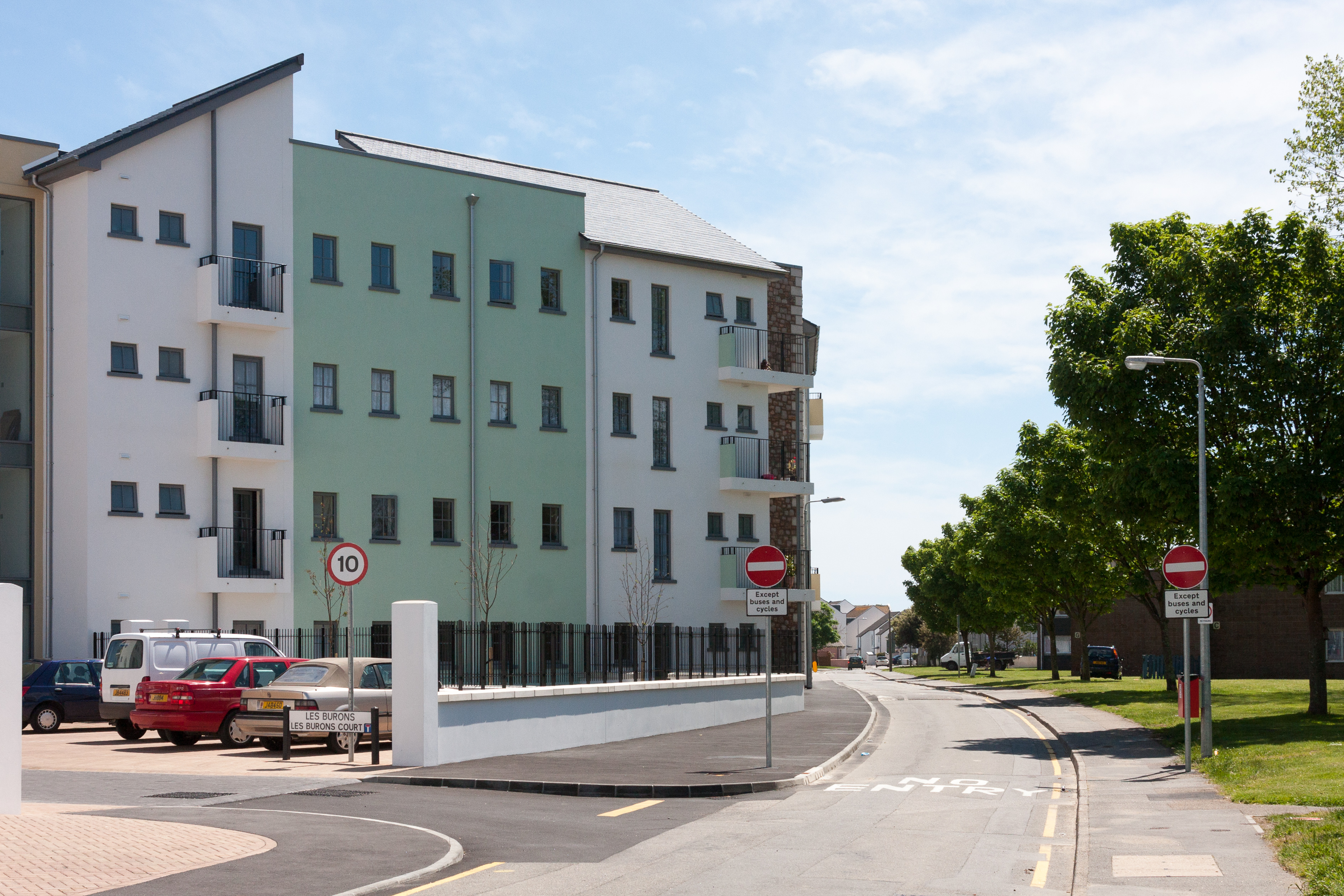
Les Burons Court is an example of a modern housing development in St Clement

St Clement is located in the south-east of the island of Jersey, the largest island of the Channel Islands archipelago and part of the British Isles. Administratively, the parish is a first-level administrative division of the Bailiwick of Jersey. It borders St Saviour to the west and north and Grouville to the east and north. It is a short distance from the boundary of the island's capital, St Helier, at Le Dicq, where there is only a short stretch of coastline in St Saviour.

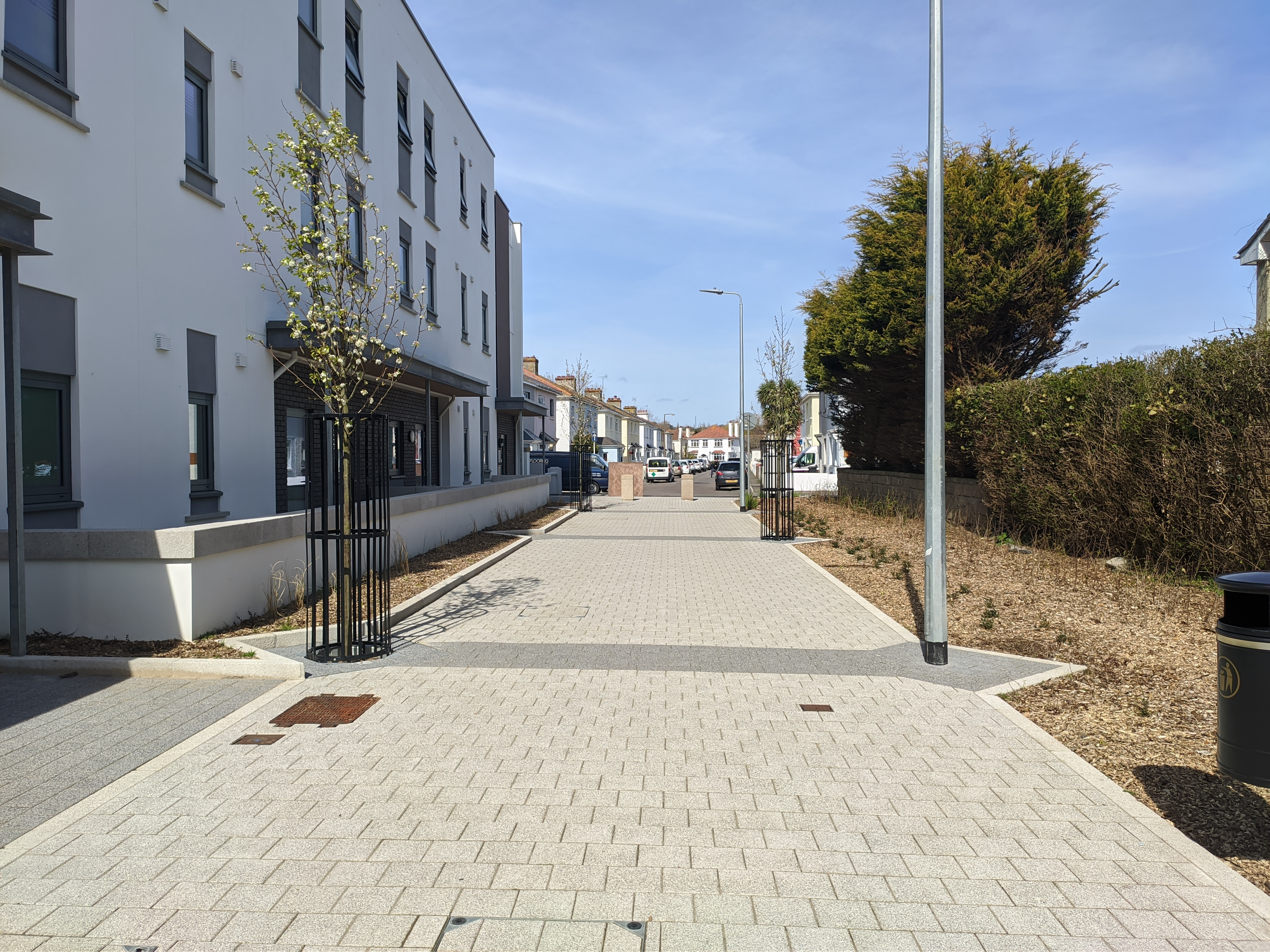
The parish is highly suburbanised. This is the new Le Squez redevelopment.

The parish is mostly low-lying and coastal, however, le Mont de Grouville stretches into the parish. The whole rocky inter-tidal zone that stretches along St Clement's coast is part of a Ramsar site of special significance.

The parish has extensive suburban development, part of the urban sprawl of the town of St Helier. This includes residential estates at Samarès, Le Squez and Pontac. There is no real definable urban centre to the parish as the parish's facilities are spread out across its land area.

=== Demography ===
The population of St Clement, according to the 2011 census is 9,221.

Historical population
| Year | Pop. | ±% |
|---|---|---|
| 1991 | 7,393 | — |
| 1996 | 7,986 | +8.0% |
| 2001 | 8,196 | +2.6% |
| 2011 | 9,221 | +12.5% |

== Education ==
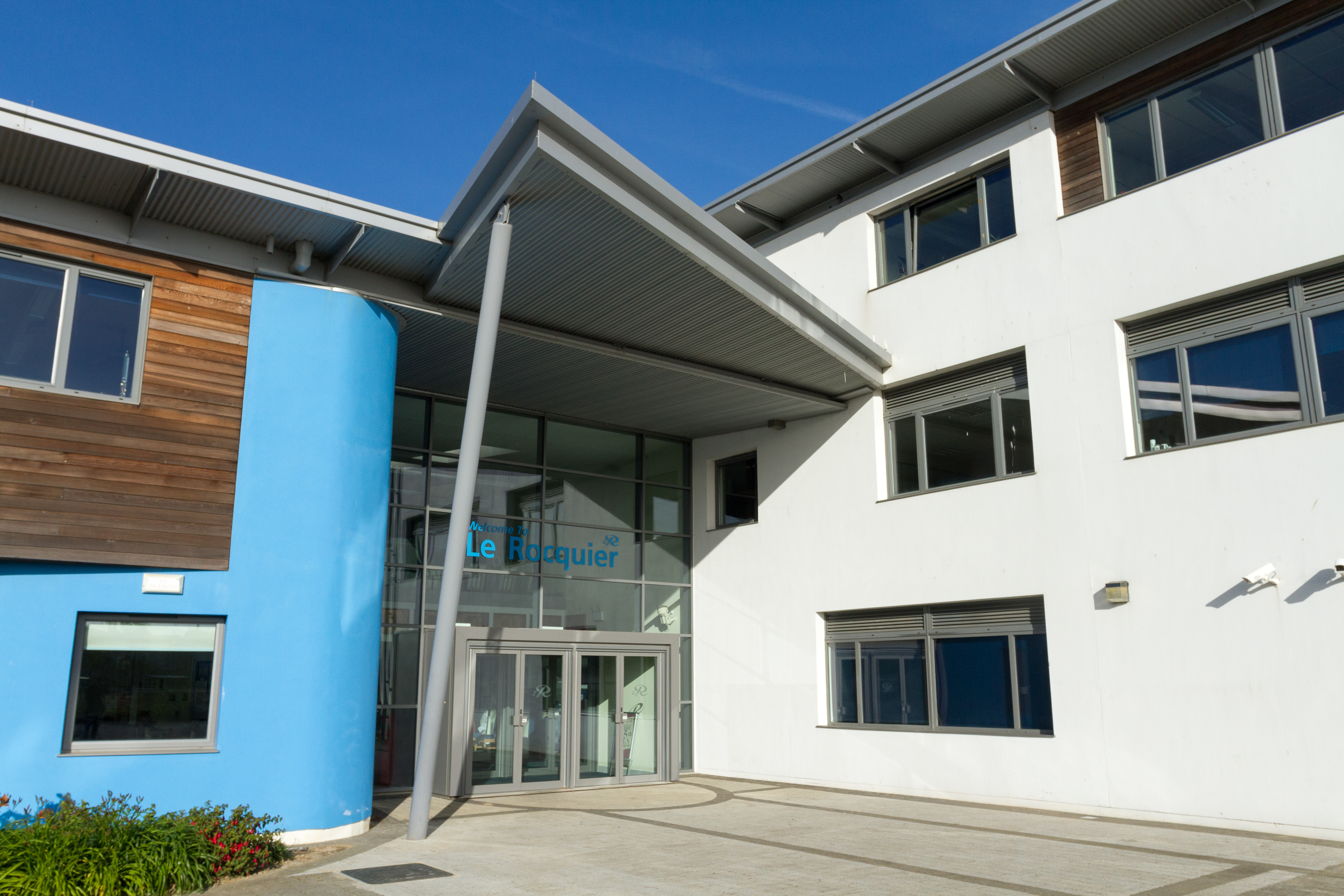
Le Rocquier School in 2013.

St Clement has two primary schools and one secondary school within its borders.

Le Rocquier School is a secondary school, on La Grande Route de St Clement. The original school buildings were replaced with a new building in 2006.

The parish school of St Clement is located on Rue de la Chapelle, a short distance from Le Rocquier School. The original buildings dates back to 1901, and was replaced in 2006 with a brand new building on the opposite side of the road.

Samarès School (formerly Le Squez School) is the other primary school, which is located further east in School Road.

== Landmarks ==
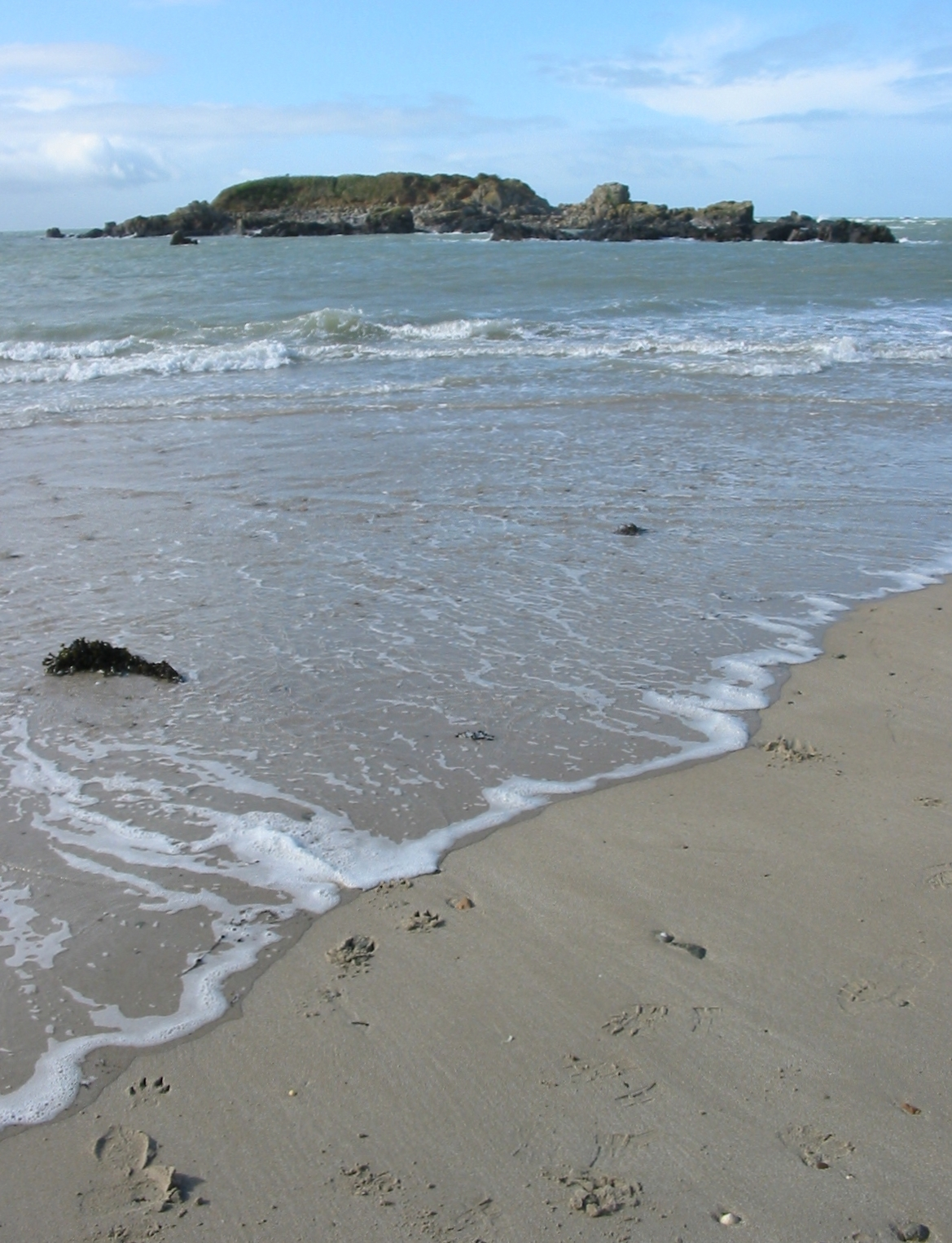
La Motte is a tidal island and archaeological site

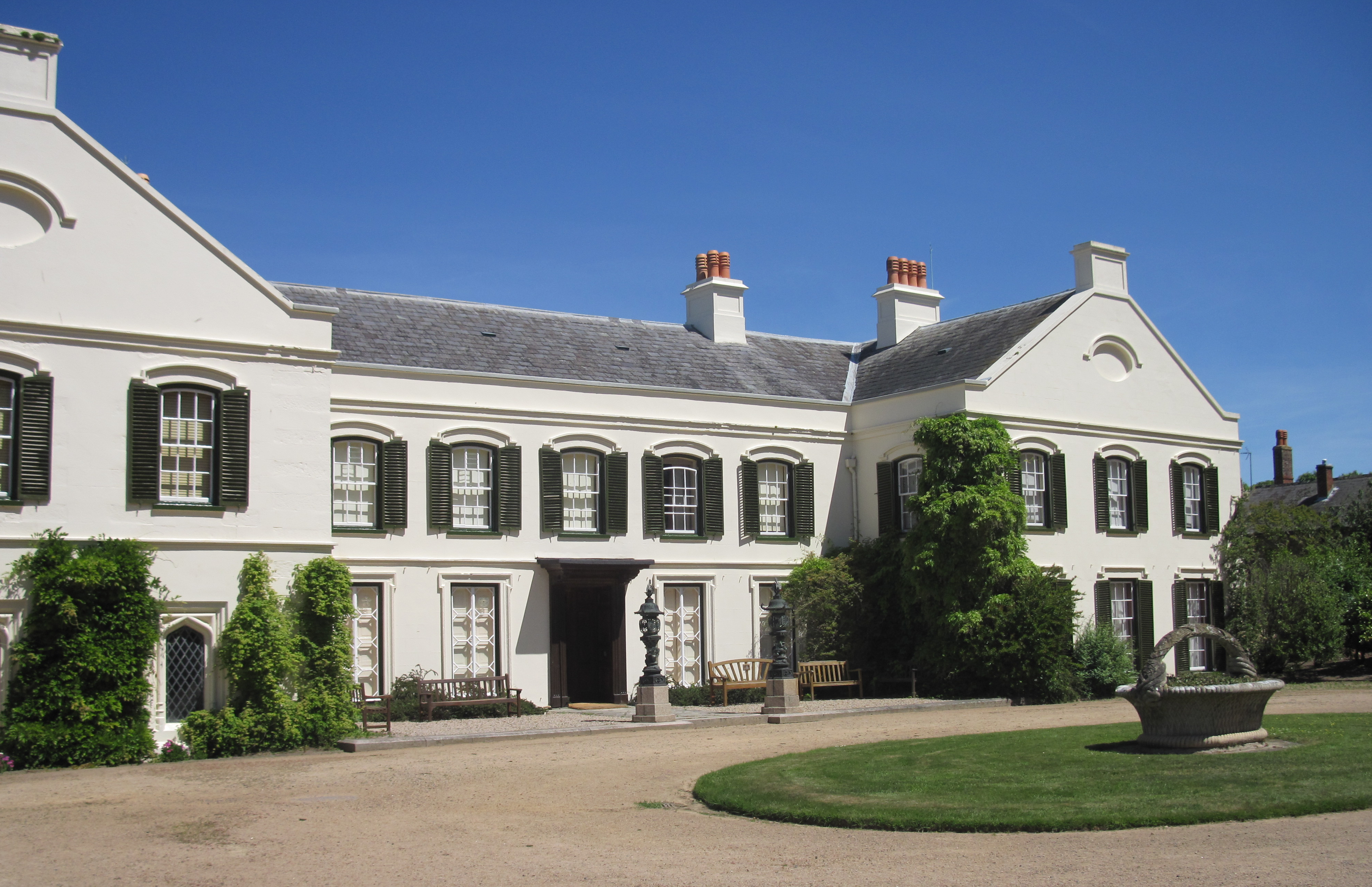
Samares Manor

The dolmen at Mont Ubé (off La Blinerie) is believed to have been left there by a pre-Celtic race called the Iberians, in around 3,000 B.C. Remains of a cemetery on La Motte (Green Island) are believed to be from later settlers. A Neolithic cairn and middens on La Motte have also been investigated.

Samarès Manor (Jèrriais: Mangni d'Sanmathès) is a manor house with medieval origins in the Vingtaine de Samarès, and is the traditional home of the Seigneur de Samarès. The name Samarès is an old French word, meaning "salt-marsh", and much of the low lying surrounding areas are or were coastal marshes.

Le Hocq Tower was built in 1778 as a coastal defence against the French when they sided with the American colonies against the British.

Seymour Tower sits two miles offshore on one of the largest inter-tidal reefs in the world. Built as part of Jersey's coastal defences, this square tower dates from the 18th century.

== Transport ==
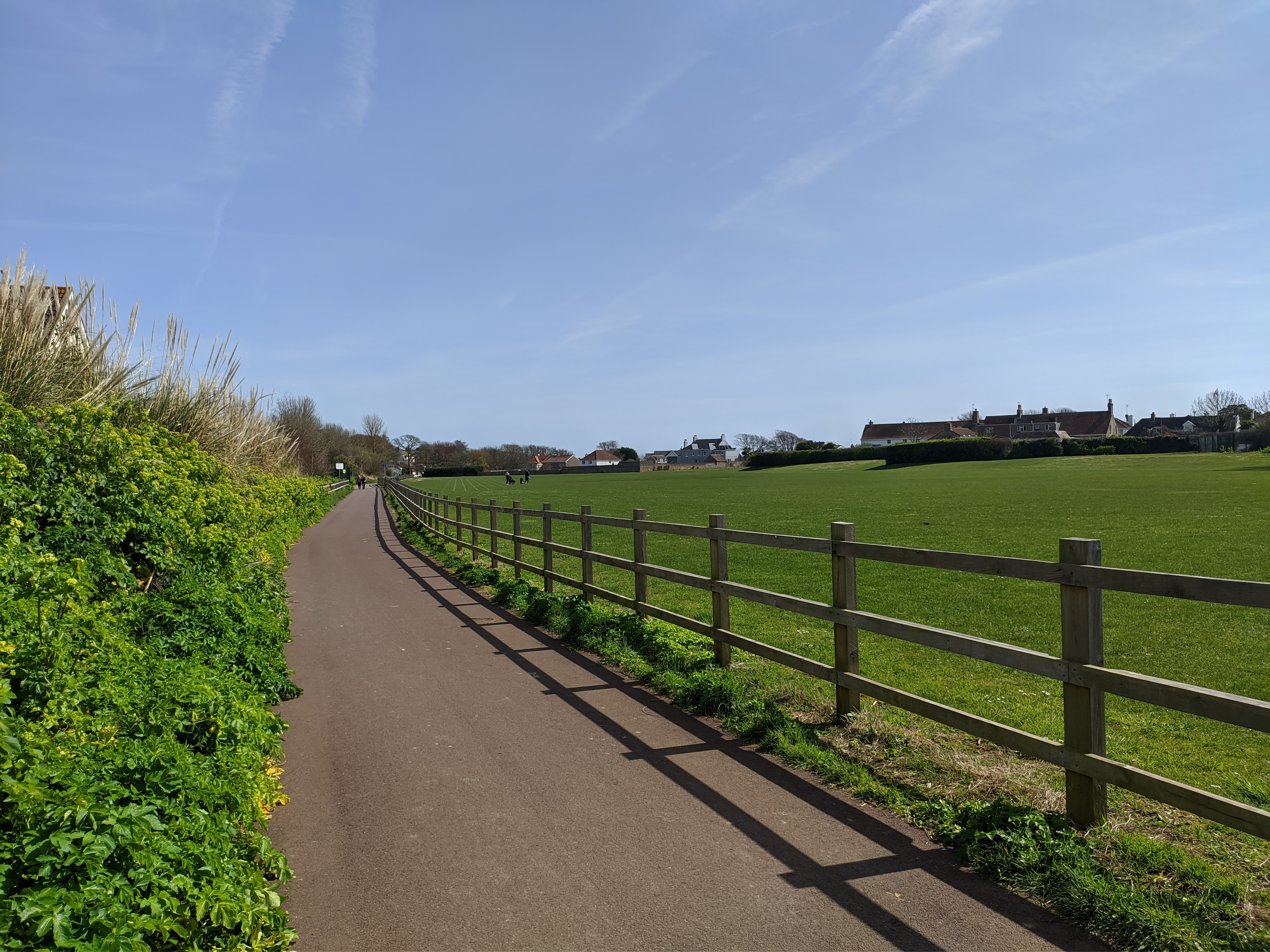
Le Rocquier cycle path and playing fields

There are two main roads that run east–west through the parish:

- A5 St Clement's Inner Road (known in French as La Grande Route de St Clement)
- A6 St Clement's Coast Road (known in French as La Grande Route de la Côte).

The Eastern Cycle Network is focused within the parish, with plans to construct a cycle route from the boundary with St Saviour to the boundary with Grouville (onto Gorey and St Helier). As part of the scheme, a number of new cycle paths have opened in the parish, such as near Le Rocquier School, and a modal filter was introduced on Rue de Maupertuis.

== Religious sites ==
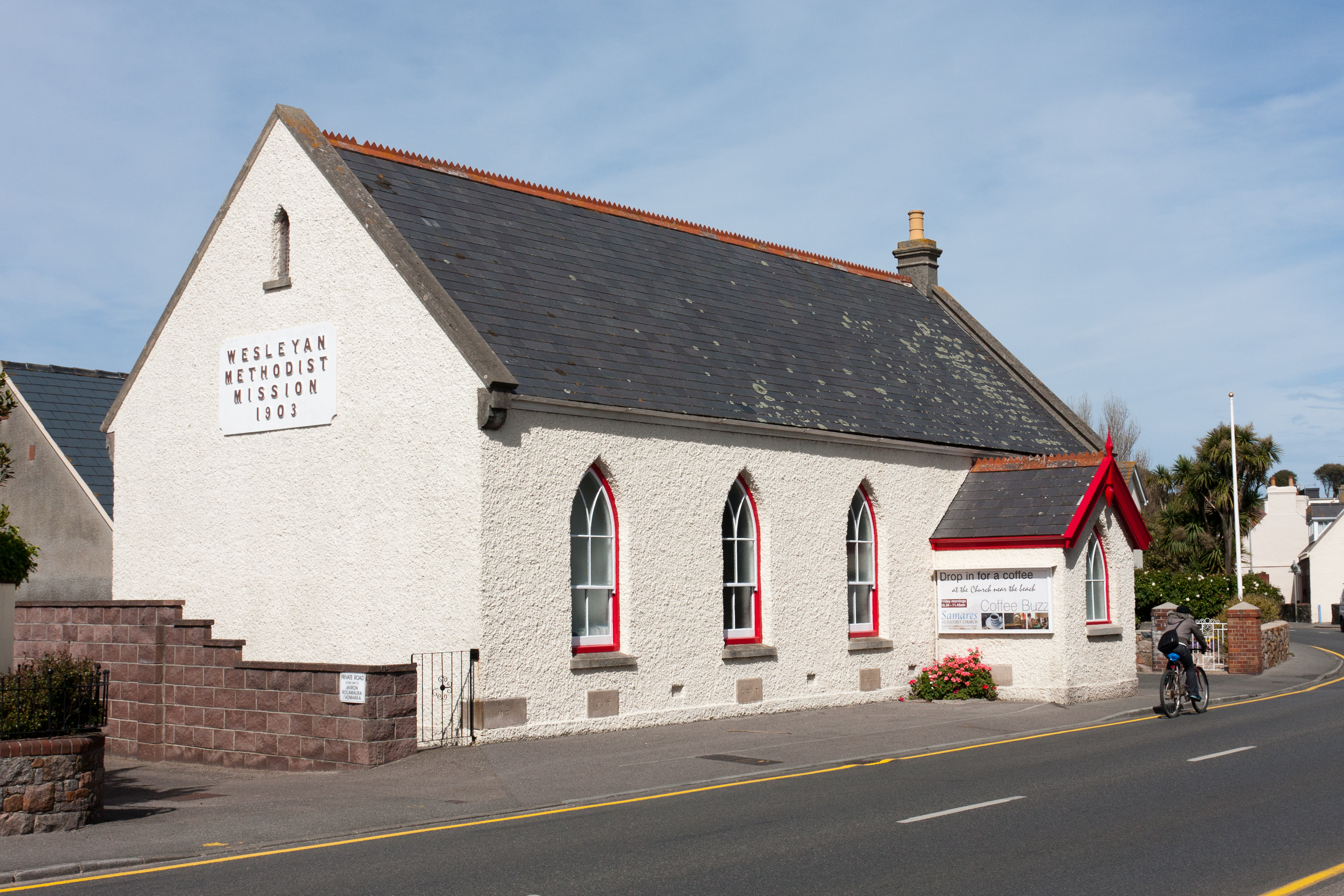
The Samarès Methodist Church building in 2012.

The parish church of St Clement is an ancient place of Anglican worship located on La Grande Route de St Clément (St Clement's inner road). St Nicholas is a smaller, sister church, located on La Grande Route de la Côte (the coast road). It was opened in 1927, after being planned, financed and largely built by the Reverend L.B. Lee.

The St Patrick's Roman Catholic Church is located on La Grande Route de St Clément at Samarès.

The Samarès Methodist Church is located on La Grande Route de la Côte, and is the southernmost church in the British Isles. However, as of February 2012, there are no longer any religious services at the church, but the church remains open for use as a community centre.

== Sport ==
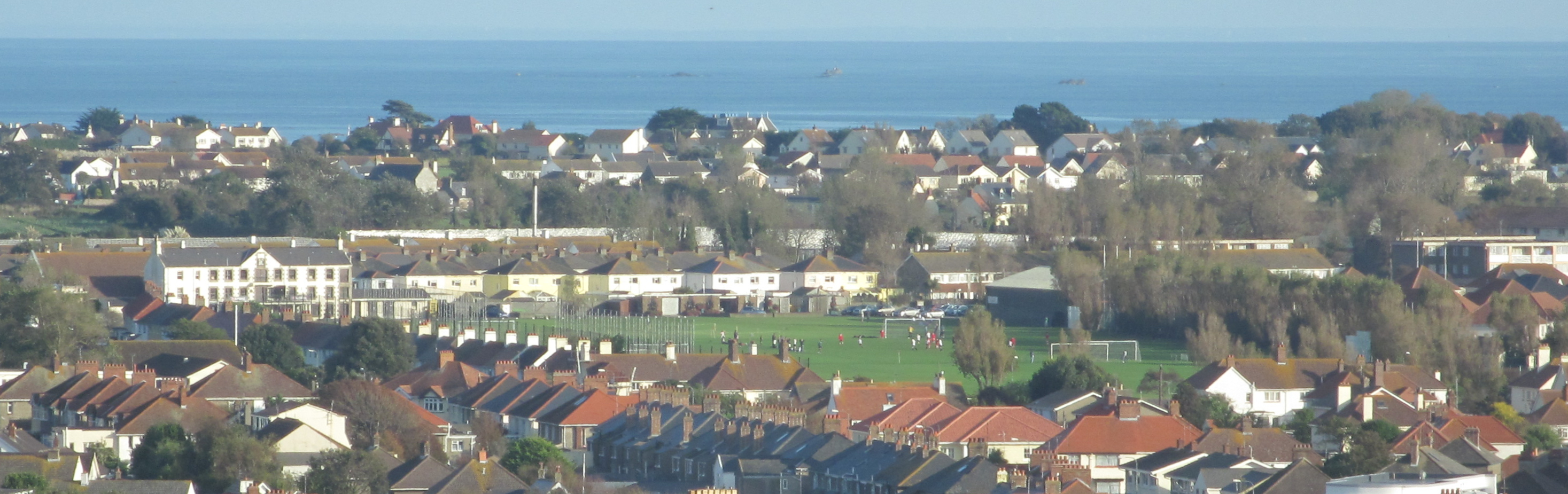
FB fields nestled between the houses

FB Playing Fields is a large outdoor sports centre located on the St Clement's Inner Road. The site was gifted to the island under a Covenant by Florence Boot, the wife of the man who transformed the Boots pharmacy chain into a national retailer. Sports played at the fields include athletics, cricket, football and netball. The Jersey Eastern Railway formerly ran through the site.

The St Clement's Golf Club and Sports Centre is home to a nine-hole golf course measuring 2,637 yards (2,411 m) as well as a three-hole Academy golf course. The site was opened in 1913 as the Jersey Recreation Grounds. Initially, the centre only had tennis courts and a bowling green. The St Clement's Golf Club, the St Clement's Ladies' Golf Club and the Jersey Squash and Racquetball Club are located on the site.

As part of the Government's Inspiring Active Places Strategy, a new facility will be constructed at Le Rocquier school to replace the existing school facilities. The target date for this is 2024/25. This will also provide a hub for public sports in the east of the island. It includes a large sports hall, a 3G football pitch, a permanent specialist gymnastics facility and a large fitness suite. There is the potential to provide a new swimming pool.

== Notable people ==
- Philip Dumaresq
- Cecil Stanley Harrison
- Victor Hugo, French writer, lived in Marina Terrace, St Clement for some time. It was here that he wrote his collection of poems entitled Les Châtiments. It was the Connétable of St Clement at the time who escorted Hugo onto a steamer bound for Guernsey, when he had insulted the British Royal Family in some of his letters
- Louisa Journeaux.

== Twin town ==
St Clement is twinned with:

- (France) Cancale, Brittany.

Before 2010, it was the only parish to not be twinned to a French town and it is the only parish to be twinned with a town in Brittany rather than Normandy.
