= Better Way 2022 =

Group of independent politicians in Jersey

- Leader: Kristina Moore
- Chairperson: Toni Roberts
- Founded: March 2022 (4 years ago)
- Ideology: Big tent Economic liberalism
- Political position: Centre
- Colours: Blue
- States Assembly: 4 / 49

Website
- www.betterway2022.je

Better Way 2022, also known as A Better Way, (Note: "Better Way 2022" is the official name used by the group. Some reporting refers to it as "A Better Way".) was a group of independent politicians in Jersey who agreed common principles and pledged to work collaboratively ahead of the 2022 general election. It was not registered as a political party.

== Common principles ==
The group's stated principles were:

- the Assembly should be responsive to the needs of the people of Jersey;
- decisions should be sustainable and evidence based, balancing social, economic and environmental wellbeing;
- public spending should be affordable now and for future generations;
- diversity should be valued, recognising the potential of every member of our community;
- Jersey should play a positive and relevant role internationally; and
- businesses and entrepreneurial skills should be supported to generate financial growth and stability.

== 2022 general election and government ==
Better Way was founded in March 2022 ahead of the 2022 general election. Five Better Way-aligned candidates stood for Deputy, of whom four were elected to the States Assembly.

All four went on to hold ministerial or assistant ministerial positions. They included Kristina Moore, who served as Chief Minister of Jersey from July 2022 until January 2024.

== Electoral performance ==
States Assembly
Election	Leader	Votes		Seats			Position	Government
Election	Leader	No.	Share	No.	±	Share	Position	Government
2022	Kristina Moore	8,016	7.7	4 / 49	▲3	8.2	2nd	Independent–Better Way–JLC

== See also ==
- Political parties in Jersey
- Politics of Jersey
- Constitution of Jersey
