= Advance Jersey =

Political party in Jersey

- Abbreviation: ADV
- Leader: Philip Bailhache
- Chairperson: Graham Boxall
- Vice-Chairperson: Pierre Horsfall
- Secretary: Rebecca Dezio (née Bailhache)
- Treasurer: John Honey
- Founded: June 2021
- Registered: 8 January 2022
- Ideology: Liberal conservatism Fiscal conservatism
- Political position: Centre-right
- Colours
- States Assembly: 2 / 49

Website
- advancejersey.je

Advance Jersey is a centre-right party in Jersey. It was founded in 2021 as the Jersey Liberal Conservatives to compete in the following year's general election. It was officially registered on 8 January 2022.

Founding members include former the Bailiff of Jersey Philip Bailhache. The party describes itself as being conservative on economic matters and liberal on sociocultural matters.

In April 2025, the party was renamed from the Jersey Liberal Conservatives to Advance Jersey ahead of the 2026 election.

== Electoral performance ==
Advance Jersey won two seats in the 2022 general election, with Sir Philip Bailhache and Malcolm Ferey elected to the States Assembly.

The party did not field any candidates in the 2026 general election. Sir Philip retired from the Assembly, while Malcolm Ferey stood for re-election as an independent candidate.

States Assembly
Election	Leader	Votes		Seats			Position	Government
Election	Leader	No.	Share	No.	±	Share	Position	Government
2022	Philip Bailhache	4,259	4.1	2 / 49	▲2	4.1	2nd	Independent–Better Way–JLC

== See also ==
- Political parties in Jersey
- Politics of Jersey
- Constitution of Jersey
