= List of schools in Jersey =

This is a list of schools in Jersey. It includes non-fee paying schools, States' fee paying schools and private schools.

== Primary schools ==
=== Non-fee paying primary schools ===
- Bel Royal School
- D'Auvergne School
- Grands Vaux School
- Grouville School
- First Tower School
- Janvrin School
- La Moye School
- Les Landes School
- Mont Nicolle School
- Plat Douet School
- Rouge Bouillon School
- St Clement's School
- St John's School
- St Lawrence School
- St Luke's School
- St Martin's School
- St Mary's School
- St Peter's School
- St Saviour's School
- Samares School
- Springfield School
- Trinity School

=== States' fee paying primary schools ===
- Jersey College Preparatory School
- Victoria College for Boys Preparatory School

=== Private primary schools ===
- Beaulieu Convent School
- De La Salle College
- FCJ Primary School
- Helvetia House School
- St George's Preparatory School
- St Michael's Preparatory School
- St Christopher's Preparatory School

== Secondary schools ==
=== Non-fee paying secondary schools ===
- Grainville School
- Haute Valleé School
- Hautlieu School (selective intake)
- Le Rocquier School
- Les Quennevais School

=== States' fee paying secondary schools ===
- Jersey College for Girls
- Victoria College (for boys)

=== Private secondary schools ===
- Beaulieu Convent School
- De La Salle College

== See also ==
- Education in Jersey
- Highlands College, Jersey
