= Education in Jersey =

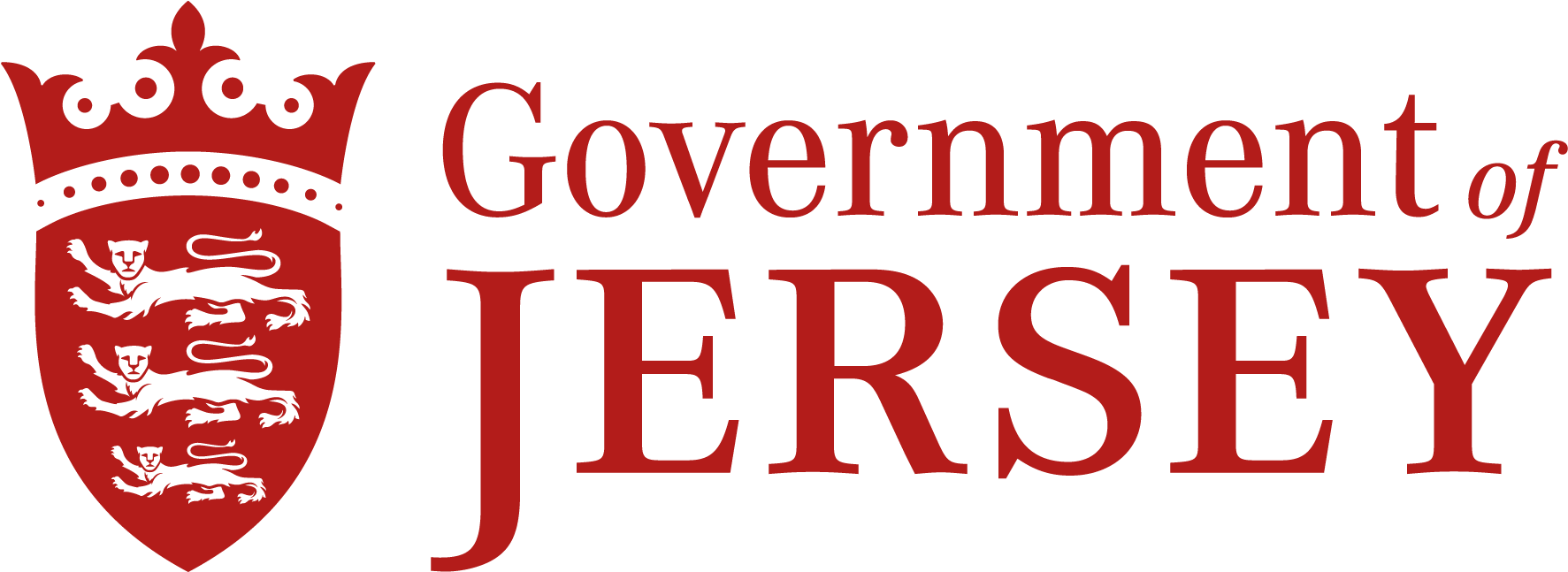

Department for Children, Young People, Education and Skills (CYPES) Jèrriais: Lé Départément pour l's êfants, les jannes et l's adresses
- Minister for Education Minister for Children: Senator Tracey Vallois Deputy Jeremy Maçon

National education budget
- Budget: £142,350,000

General details
- Primary languages: English (76%) Portuguese (15%) Polish (5%)

Education in Jersey is overseen by the Department for Children, Young People, Education and Skills. The Government is responsible for all Government-maintained schools on the island, including the Further Education College, Highlands College, as well as the fee-paying schools of Victoria College and Jersey College for Girls. There are also independent schools and religious schools, including De La Salle College, Beaulieu Convent School and St Michael's School.

Students at Government-maintained schools will attend primary school from Reception to Year 6 (ages 4 to 11; Early Years Foundation, Key Stage 1 and Key Stage 2), and secondary school from Year 7 to 9 (ages 11 to 14; Key Stage 3). Then students can either attend Hautlieu School, a grammar school, or continue at their current secondary school from Year 10 to 11 (ages 14 to 16; Key Stage 4). At the end of Year 11, students typically take General Certificate of Secondary Education (GCSE) exams or other Level 1 or Level 2 qualifications. For students who do not pursue academic qualifications until the end of Year 13, these qualifications are roughly equivalent to the completion of high school in many other countries.

Education is compulsory to the age of 16, however students may take A-levels at one of the Sixth Form colleges on the island (four are fee paying, only Hautlieu School is free for all islanders) or take other Level 3 qualifications at Highlands College, the only FE college on the island. After graduating from Sixth Form, many students will study off-island, typically in England, at a Higher Education institution or on-island at Highlands College or University College Jersey. The Government of Jersey offers means-tested tuition-fee and maintenance grants to island HE students for most degrees up to £9,250 pa (as of 2020–21).

The education system is roughly similar to that used in England, Wales and Northern Ireland. National school examinations and vocational education qualifications are the same as those issued by the UK Ofqual and follow the Regulated Qualifications Framework used in the UK, however are also approved by the Jersey Approved Qualifications Panel. The island has however a distinct National Curriculum, based on the English National Curriculum, known as the Jersey Curriculum.

== History ==
In the 1590s, Laurens Baudains, a wealthy farmer from St. Martin, lobbied the monarch and the States of Jersey to support a scheme for the establishment of a college. The aim of the project was to instruct the youth of Jersey in "grammar, Latin, the liberal arts and religion". In the 1860s, the ancient grammar schools of St. Mannelier and St. Anastase closed and their endowments were later used to fund scholarships at Victoria College. The education of girls in Jersey from the mid-19th century lagged behind provision for boys. Victoria College had been opened for boys, on the pattern of English public schools, in 1852. The well-to-do and the élite classes continued to employ governesses or to send their daughters to schools in France or England; other classes relied on the existing elementary schools in Jersey. Jersey people of influence gathered at the Grove Place Wesleyan Chapel in Saint Helier on 28 November 1879 and decided to set up a limited liability company to further a plan to provide a college for girls in Jersey. Towards the end of the 19th century Catholic teaching and nursing orders – the De La Salle brothers, Jesuits and Little Sisters of the Poor – settled in Jersey. In 1894, the Jesuits bought a property called Highlands, which later became Highlands College. In 1917, the De La Salle Brothers founded De La Salle College, Jersey.

In 2012, it was announced that the headteacher of Hautlieu School would also become the head of Highlands College, after the retirement of Highlands' Principal and Chief Executive Professor Ed Sallis, OBE. This is did not happen.

From spring 2017, the qualification system used in Jersey changed in line with the changes brought in for England. GCSEs are now graded 9-1 rather than A*-G and there is less coursework.

== Legally compulsory education ==
Full-time education is compulsory for all children aged 5 to 16, either at school or otherwise, with a child beginning primary education during the school year they turn 5. Parents may have up to 20 hours Government-funded pre-school education for up to 20 hours for 38 weeks per year during school term-time for any child that will turn four years old during the academic year.

Government-provided schooling and sixth-form education are paid for by taxes. Independent schools on the island receive subsidies from the Government. A child is of compulsory school age throughout the period beginning on the first day of the school term in which the child's fifth birthday falls and ending on 30 June in the school year in which the child attains the age of 16 years.

The compulsory stages of education are broken into a Foundation Stage (covering the last part of optional and first part of compulsory education), four Key Stages, and post-16 education, sometimes unofficially termed Key Stage Five, which takes a variety of forms, including 6th Form, which covers the last two years of Secondary Education in schools.

== Stages of compulsory education ==
Key stage	Year	Exams taken	Age	Jersey Comprehensive Schools	Hautlieu School	Fee-paying schools	England "Public school" system
Early years	Nursery		3 to 4	Pre-School			Pre-preparatory
Early years	Reception		4 to 5	Primary		Primary	
KS1	Year 1		5 to 6	Primary		Primary	
KS1	Year 2		6 to 7	Primary		Primary	
KS2	Year 3		7 to 8	Primary		Primary or Prep (Victoria College)	
KS2	Year 4		8 to 9	Primary		Primary or Prep (Victoria College)	Preparatory
KS2	Year 5	CATs	9 to 10	Primary		Primary or Prep (Victoria College)	Preparatory
KS2	Year 6		10 to 11	Primary		Primary or Prep (Victoria College)	Preparatory
KS3	Year 7	CATs	11 to 12	Secondary Comprehensive		Secondary	Preparatory
KS3	Year 8		12 to 13	Secondary Comprehensive		Secondary	Preparatory
KS3	Year 9	CATs	13 to 14	Secondary Comprehensive		Secondary	Senior
KS4	Year 10		14 to 15	Secondary	Hautlieu School	Secondary	Senior
KS4	Year 11	GCSEs	15 to 16	Secondary	Hautlieu School	Secondary	Senior

== Schools ==
Schools of all age groups in the island are broadly divided into three categories. Provided schools are those which are maintained by the States, and include all parish schools. By law, parents have the right to express a preference of any provided school (other than Victoria College and Jersey College for Girls) they wish for their child to attend. Certain provided schools (Victoria College and Jersey College for Girls, with their associated primary schools) are allowed to charge fees. Non-provided schools are all schools not maintained by the States, and must be registered with the Government. 6 schools and colleges provide options for post-16 education. 66% of all students attend Government non-fee paying schools. Around one-third of students attend schools where fees are paid.

== Further and higher education ==
Higher education students from Jersey generally study in the UK. According to Chief Minister John Le Fondré, on average, 1200 Jersey students leave the island to study at higher education institutions in the UK. Students pay the same university fees, capped at £9,250 pa for most full-time undergraduate courses (2020–21), as students from England. In the past some universities charged Island students International fees, however from 1 August 2021, Channel Islands students fees will legally be capped in the UK at the same rate as Home students.

Jersey has a college of further education and university centre, Highlands College. As well as offering part-time and evening courses Highlands is the largest sixth form provider in the Island, and works collaboratively with a range of organisations including the Open University, University of Plymouth and London South Bank University. In particular students can study at Highlands for the two-year Foundation Degree in Financial Services and for BSc Social Sciences, both validated by the University of Plymouth.

The Institute of Law is Jersey's law school, providing a course for students seeking to qualify as Jersey advocates and solicitors. It also provides teaching for students enrolled on the University of London LLB degree programme, via the International Programmes. The Open University supports students in Jersey (but they pay higher fees than UK students). Private sector higher-education providers include the Jersey International Business School.

== Curriculum ==
The Jersey Curriculum is established by education law, published by the Minister for Education and is taught in all schools in the island to children of compulsory school age. The Jersey Curriculum Council, appointed by the Minister, is a statutory consultee for the creation of the Curriculum. Religious education is also taught in all provided schools to a separate curriculum as consulted with the Religious Education Advisory Council, which is formed of teachers, government representatives and representatives from religious traditions in the island. In provided schools, students must by law attend a Christian act of worship at least once a week, unless their parent opts them out.

The Jersey Curriculum follows the National Curriculum of England, with differences to account for government and States decisions over education. The Jersey Curriculum is only one part of each school's curriculum, which is designed independently by the schools. For example, the History curriculum specifies that students should learn about the history of Jersey, rather than the history of England, though aspects of British history are included at every stage.
