= Shenton (surname) =

Shenton is a toponymic surname from Shenton in Leicestershire, Sheinton in Shropshire, or Shavington in Cheshire. In 1888, it was most prominent in Staffordshire, with significant presence in Lancashire and Cheshire, although, in 1890, Henry Brougham Guppy lists the surname as being mostly confined to Staffordshire.

== Notable people ==
- Ben Shenton (born 1960), Jersey politician
- Brian Shenton (1927–1987), British sprinter
- Edward Shenton (1895–1977), American illustrator and author
- Ernest Shenton (1930–2008), businessman
- George Shenton, Sr. (1811–1867), Australian pharmacist and merchant
- George Shenton (1842–1909), Australian businessman and mayor
- George Shenton (footballer) (1899–1978), English footballer
- Henry Chawner Shenton (1803–1866), English engraver
- Herbert N. Shenton (died 1937), sociologist
- Michael Shenton (born 1986), English rugby player
- Ollie Shenton (born 1997), English footballer
- Rachel Shenton (born 1987), English actress, screenwriter, and activist
- Richard Shenton (1926–2013), Jersey politician
- Richard Shenton (cricketer) (born 1972), English cricketer
- Shenton Thomas (1879–1962), colonial governor
- William Shenton (1885–1967), English solicitor who worked in Hong Kong

== See also ==
- Shinton
