= Stenton (disambiguation) =

Stenton is a parish and village in East Lothian, Scotland.

Stenton may also refer to:

== People ==
- Stenton (surname)

== Places ==
- Stenton (mansion), the country home of James Logan.
- Stenton station, a regional railway station in Philadelphia, USA.
