= St Thomas Church, Jersey =

St Thomas Church
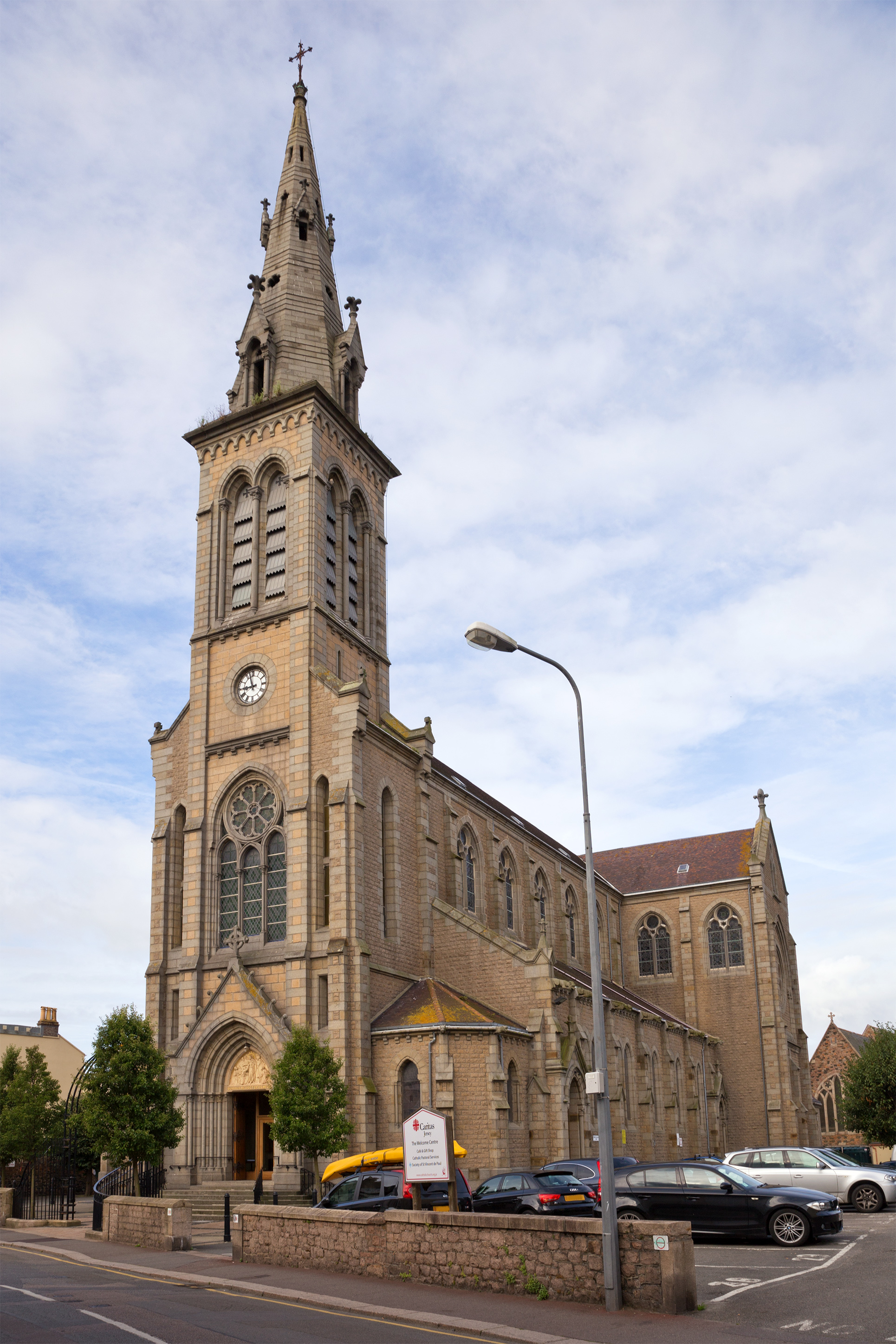
- St Thomas Church
- 49°11′20″N 2°06′20″W
- Location: Val Plaisant, St. Helier
- Country: Jersey
- Denomination: Roman Catholic
- Website: catholicchurch.org.je

History
- Consecrated: 5 September 1893

Architecture
- Architect: Alfred Frangeul
- Style: Gothic Revival
- Years built: 1883–1887

Administration
- Province: Southwark
- Diocese: Portsmouth

Clergy
- Dean: Canon Dominic Golding

St Thomas Church (Jèrriais: Églyise dé Saint Thonmas) is a historic Roman Catholic church in St. Helier, Jersey. It is the largest church in the Channel Islands, and first opened in 1887.

== History ==
=== Restoring Catholicism ===
Catholicism was restored to Jersey with the influx of refugees fleeing to the island to escape the French Revolution. With the arrival of bishops, priests and laity from revolutionary France, Catholic chapels were set up in St. Helier to meet their spiritual needs.

=== Establishing a church ===
The first sizeable permanent post-Reformation Catholic church was a converted Protestant chapel in New Street, which was established in 1842 and dedicated to St. Thomas in honour of Bishop Thomas Griffiths, Apostolic Vicariate of the London District, who opened it for worship. The church was served by various French and Belgium diocesan priests until 1880, when the bishop handed the mission over to the French province of the Oblates of Mary Immaculate.

Within two years, an appeal was started for the building of a new church in Val Plaisant, which opened in 1887. The French-speaking parishioners were so proud of this church, the largest in the Channel Islands, that they called it La Cathédrale.

The consecration took place on 5 September 1893, to commemorate the centenary of the re-establishment of the Catholic Church in the Channel Isles, in 1793, when the bill of tolerance was handed over to Mathieu de Gruchy, a Jerseyman and a convert who became a priest in the French diocese of Luçon before the Revolution.

From 1880 until 1999 the church was served faithfully by French Missionary Oblates of Mary Immaculate. It was Father Donat Michaux, O.M.I., who raised the money for and directed the building of the church. For this reason, he has always been regarded as its founder. The church was adapted for the new liturgy in 1984 and was beautifully restored in 2006/2007 under the direction of Monsignor Nicholas France, Catholic dean in Jersey.

== Description ==
St. Thomas's Church is constructed in the thirteenth-century style and comprises nave, aisles, transepts with chapels forming the arms of the Cross, and a chancel. Two small chapels lengthening the lower sides westward have the appearance of chancels to either aisles. On each side of the tower are two other chapels with groined vaults, that at the south end having a deep recess in the centre of which stands the baptismal font.

At the apsis of the chancel and in corbel on a low granite shaft with moulded base and sculptured capital is a richly framed niche, occupying the centre arch of an arcade with a bud ornament. Inside the niche is a group representing the Apparition of the Sacred Heart to St. Margaret Mary Alacoque at Paray-le-Monial. Above is a circular window with a twelve-section tracery work.

=== Frescos ===
The fresco paintings on either side of the rose window represent, at the top, left to right, St. Michael and guardian angels, angels playing musical instruments and angels singing, and above the cornice, saints: St. Thomas of Aquinas and St. Thomas the Apostle, St. Louis IX, King of France, St. George, the patron saint of England, St. Joan of Arc, St. Peter, the Blessed Virgin, St. Joseph, St. Anne, two Carmelite Saints, and two Virgins and Martyrs.

The two other paintings in the lancet arches, with a blending of allegorical and realistic designs, symbolize the Good Shepherd and the Holy Redeemer. The hollow of the cornice under the niche, the lancets and on the sides of the altar is of a richly foliated work.

=== The nave ===
The nave is divided into seven arches, two lancets and five large; the chancel is separated from the adjacent chapels by a large equilateral arch and a lancet arch. Each of the lancets, west and east of the transepts is surmounted by sculptured brackets to receive statues for which sculptured canopies have also been arranged. The walls of the nave and of the chancel are supported on each side by piers of clustered shafts in Crazannes stone. Each semi-detached shaft is crowned with a sculptured capital from which spring the arches. Each capital has a different design of sculptured foliage, flowers and buds, both in the nave and chancel and the aisles and transepts.

=== Dimensions ===
The height of the nave is 60 feet beneath the vault; that of the aisles is 30 feet. The length of the nave is 109 feet from the communion rail to the inner door of the porch; the chancel is 36 feet. The breadth across the transepts is 89 feet. The total length of the Church externally is 179 feet from the niche to the portal; internally it is 163 feet, inclusive of the depth of the porch under the steeple which is 18 feet.

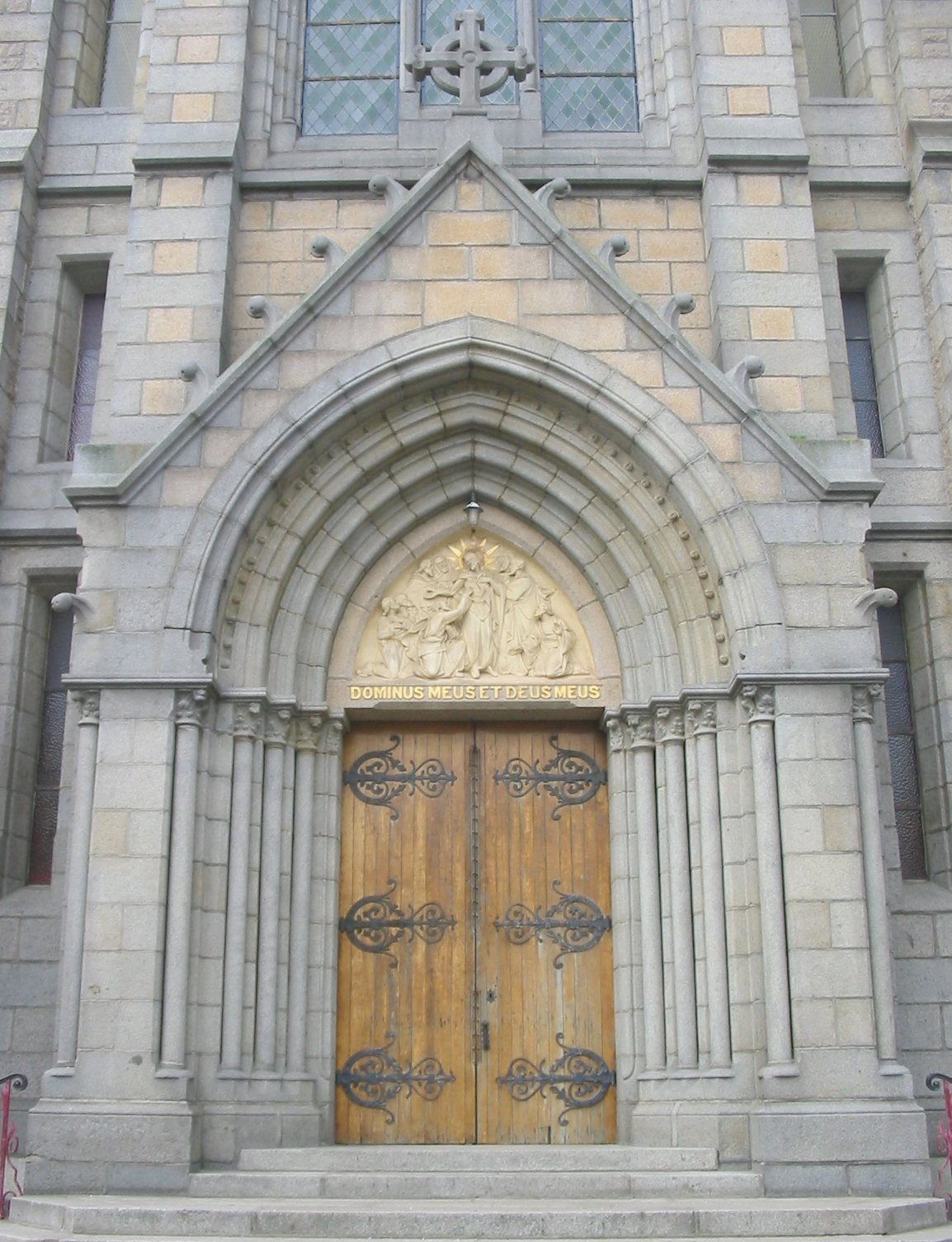
The main porch of the church.

=== The vaults ===
All the groined roof is made of hollow bricks covered with plaster, having the appearance of stone, that of the nave, of the chancel, of the transepts and of the chapels forming the arms of the Cross is ornamented with moulded arches with sculptured keystones.

The vaults are strengthened by interior and exterior buttresses surmounted by gargoyles representing chimeras of different kinds.

=== The steeple ===
The tower, built of Brittany granite, is composed of a rectangular portion into which the portal opens and is surmounted by an open-work spire. The portal, with a tympanum representing the Apparition of our Lord, after His Resurrection, to St. Thomas the Apostle, and signed Louis Dupont, is surmounted by a three-light window with mullions and a tracery rose, in blue granite of Brittany.

It gives light to the gallery from the east. The steeple is 111 feet from the ground to the spire windows, and from these to the summit of the Cross it is 85 feet, giving a total of 196 feet.

=== Clock and bells ===
The portion of the tower above the roof of the church holds the belfry with a peal of five bells:

- treble B, 5 cwt, Eloise-Ida-Therese de l’FJ
- 3 F sharp, 16 cwt, Clotilde-Louise-Leonie
- 4 E, 20 cwt, Marie Immaculee
- tenor B, 52 cwt, Anne-Marie-Andree-Ignace

Treble B and G sharp have been cast by Cornille-Havard of Villedieu, while F sharp, E and tenor B are by Paccard of Annecy.

In the room below the belfry is the clock which is moved electrically and strikes the hours only.

=== Organ and gallery ===
The organ was erected in 1959 by Henry Willis & Sons. It is an instrument fully reconditioned with two keyboards and a pedal-board.

This vast gallery, extending over the porch and projecting into the nave, is supported by a three arched vault with mouldings at the groins. The arches, at the back, spring from the clustered pillars flanking the tower wall, and, on the front side, from the two last piers of clustered shafts of the nave and from the two circular piers, with mouldings at the base and finely sculptured capitals, which stand in the centre, forming three arches, one large and two small. On top of these runs the sloped cornice with a parapet in three panels of quatrefoil open-work.

== Priests in charge ==
The Catholic Church, re-established in Jersey in 1793, was under the double direction of Joseph-Dominique de Cheylus, the Bishop of Bayeux, and Augustin-René-Louis Le Mintier, the last bishop of Tréguier, on behalf of the diocese of St. Brieuc. They were helped in their sacred ministry by Rev. Mathieu de Gruchy and a certain number of other priests who administered the sacraments in private oratories.

=== Priests in charge of French-speaking Catholics from 1803 ===
- J. Philibert - 1803 director of St. Louis Oratory
- F. Le Guedois - 1809 director of St. Louis Oratory
- J. Morlais - 1837 director of St. Louis Oratory; 1842, Rector of St. Thomas, and Dean
- J. Volkerick - 1860 Rector of St. Thomas
- M. Morin - 1878 Rector of St. Thomas
- V. Bourde - 1880 Rector of St. Thomas
- V. Fick - 1885 Rector of St. Thomas
- C. Le Vacon, O.M.I. - 1895 Rector of St. Thomas
- L. Legrand, O.M.I. - 1899 Rector of St. Thomas
- L. Guillient, O.M.I. - 1911 Rector of St. Thomas
- A. Mao, O.M.I. - 1920 Rector of St. Thomas
- T. Mare, O.M.I. - 1933 Rector of St. Thomas
- P. Jon, O.M.I. - 1946 Rector of St. Thomas
- H. Verkin, O.M.I. - 1955 Rector of St. Thomas
- J. Simon, O.M.I. - 1961 Rector of St. Thomas

== The church today ==
St. Thomas's is now a church of the Diocese of Portsmouth and is served by diocesan clergy.

The church epitomizes Catholicism in counting among its congregation people of many nations and diverse backgrounds. In particular, it is the spiritual home of the considerable number of Portuguese and Polish migrants who in recent years have come to the island to find work. Mass is regularly held in Portuguese, Polish and, only occasionally today, French.

There is a presbytery and church office adjacent to the church, together with the church hall. On the other side of the church, another refurbished building houses Catholic Pastoral Services, the Welcome Centre and the office of the Society of St. Vincent de Paul.

== Gallery ==
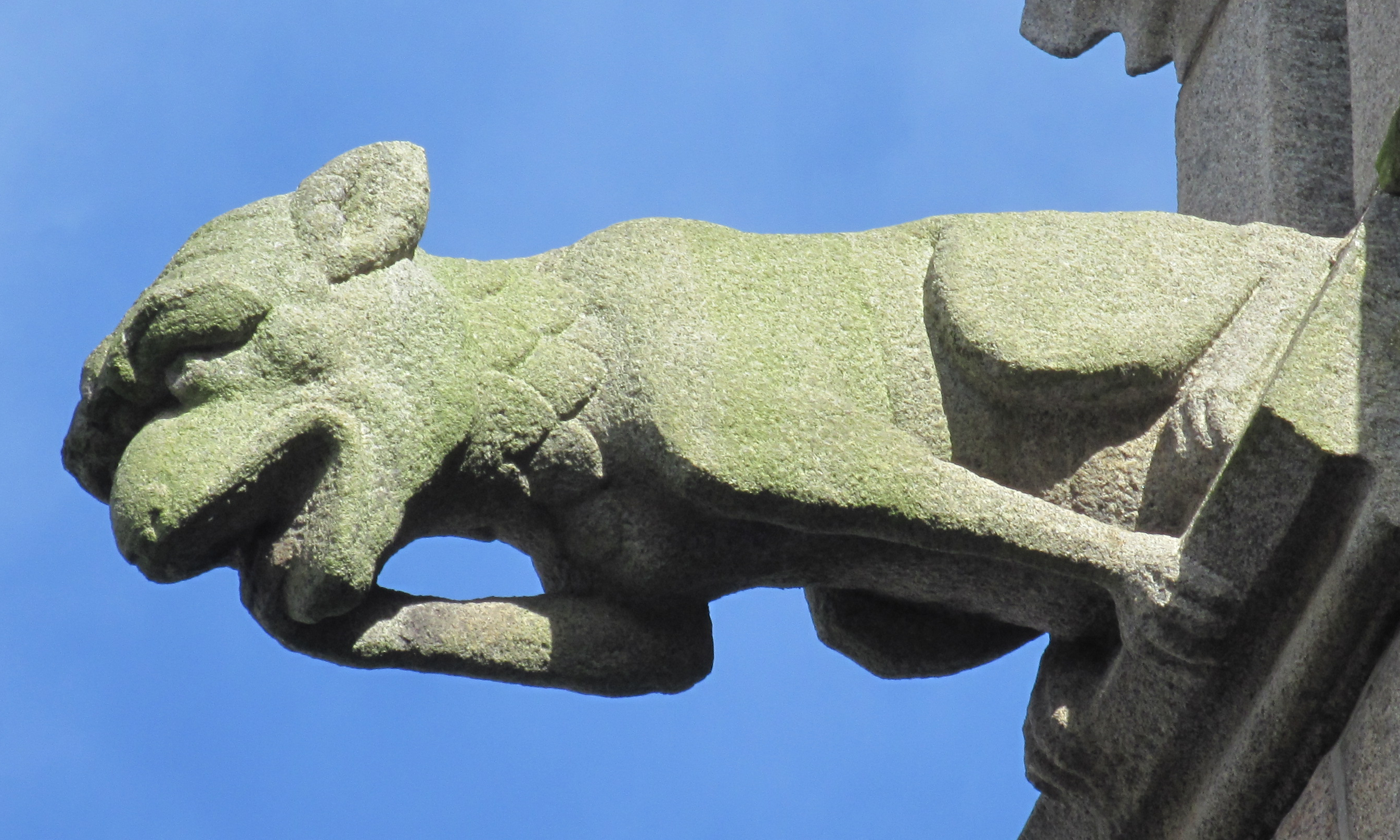
Gargoyle

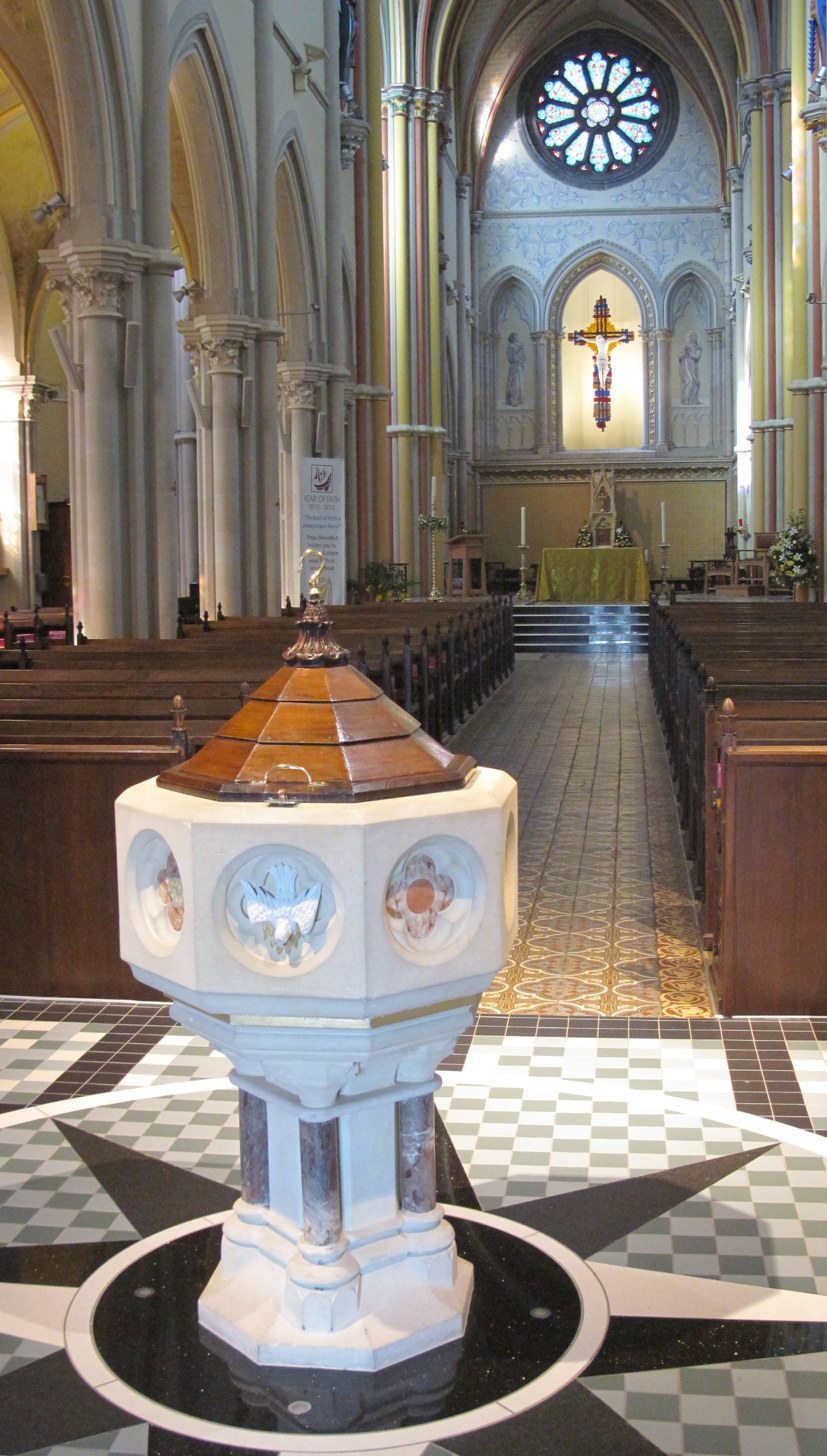
The baptismal font

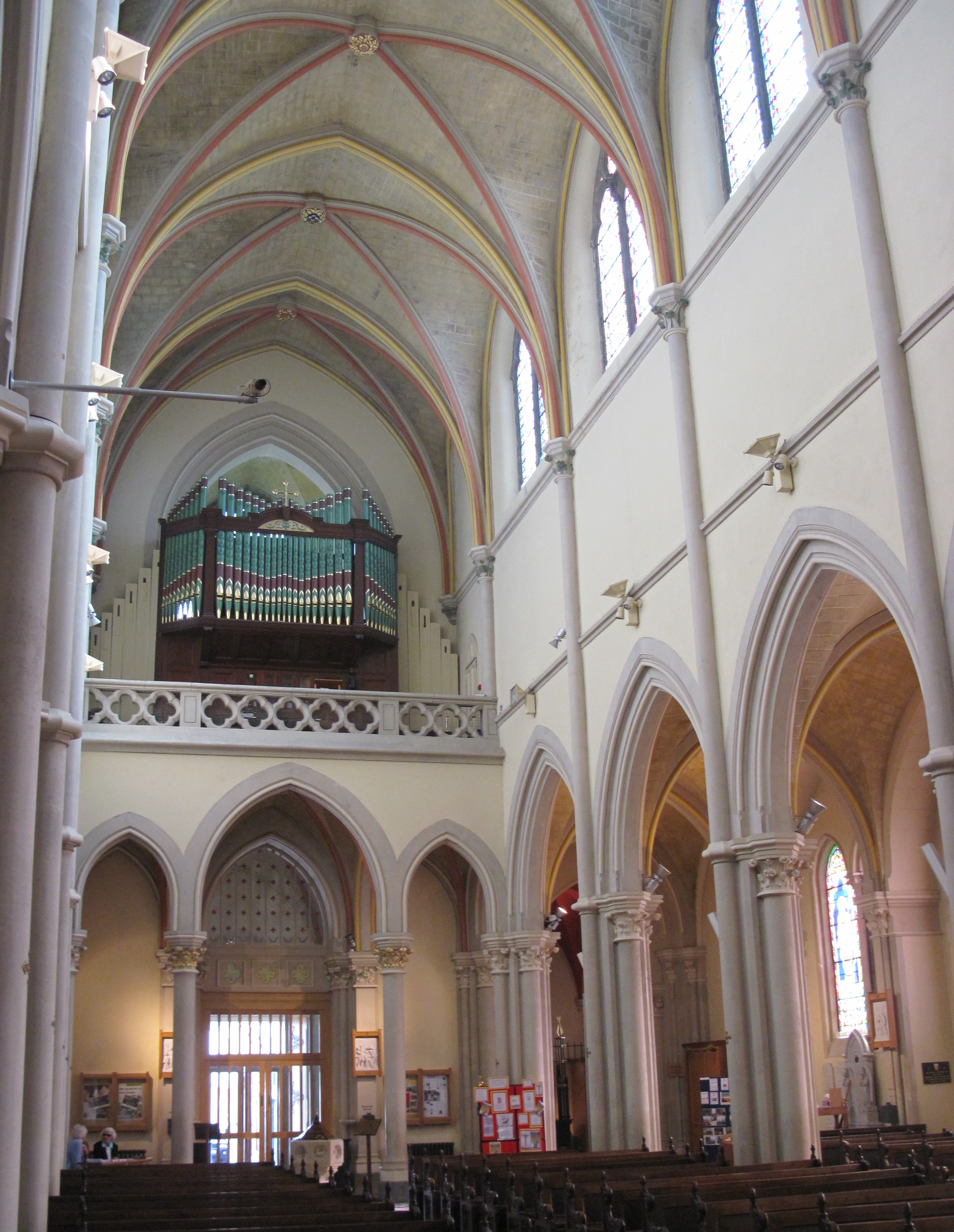
The nave

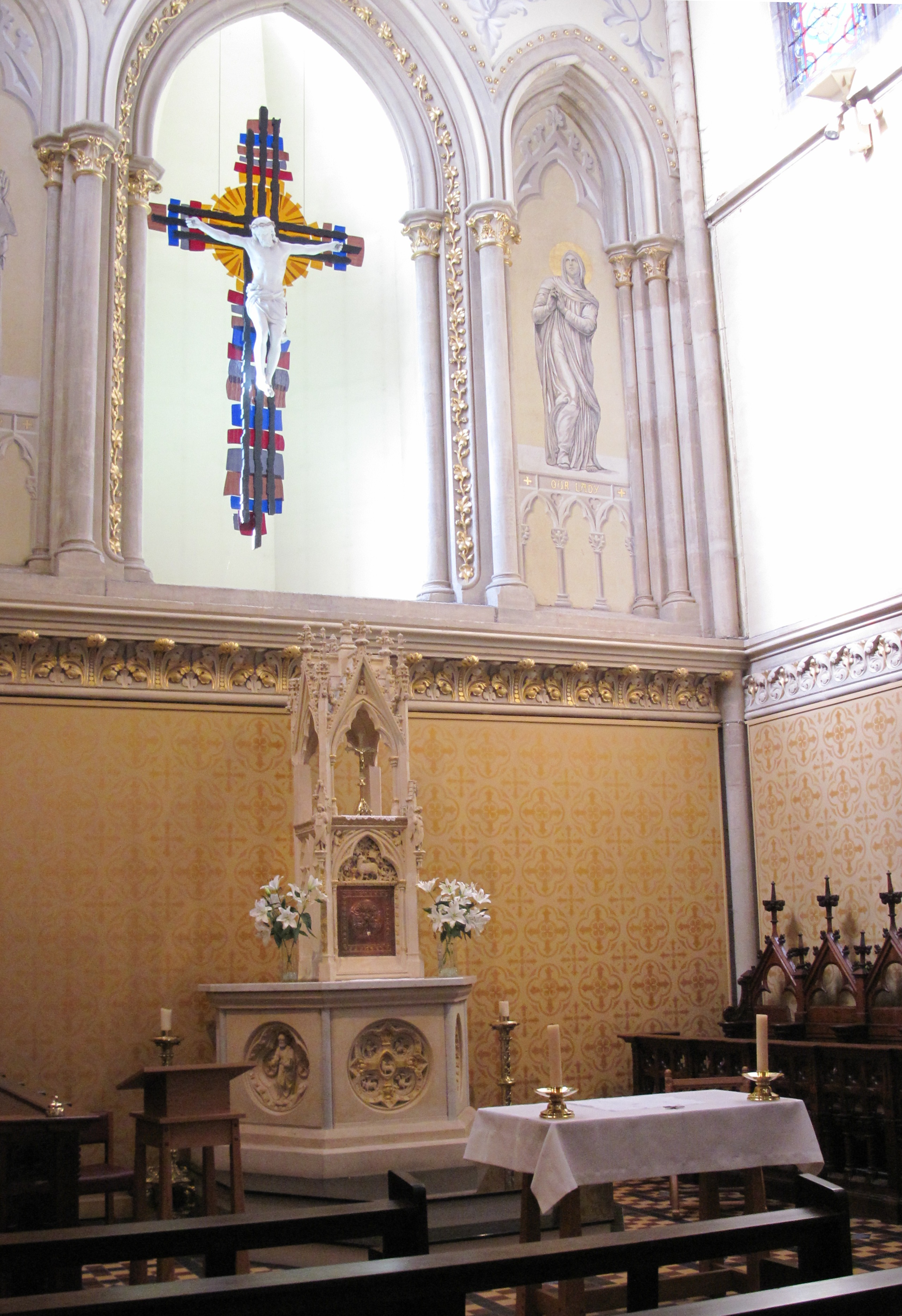
The altar

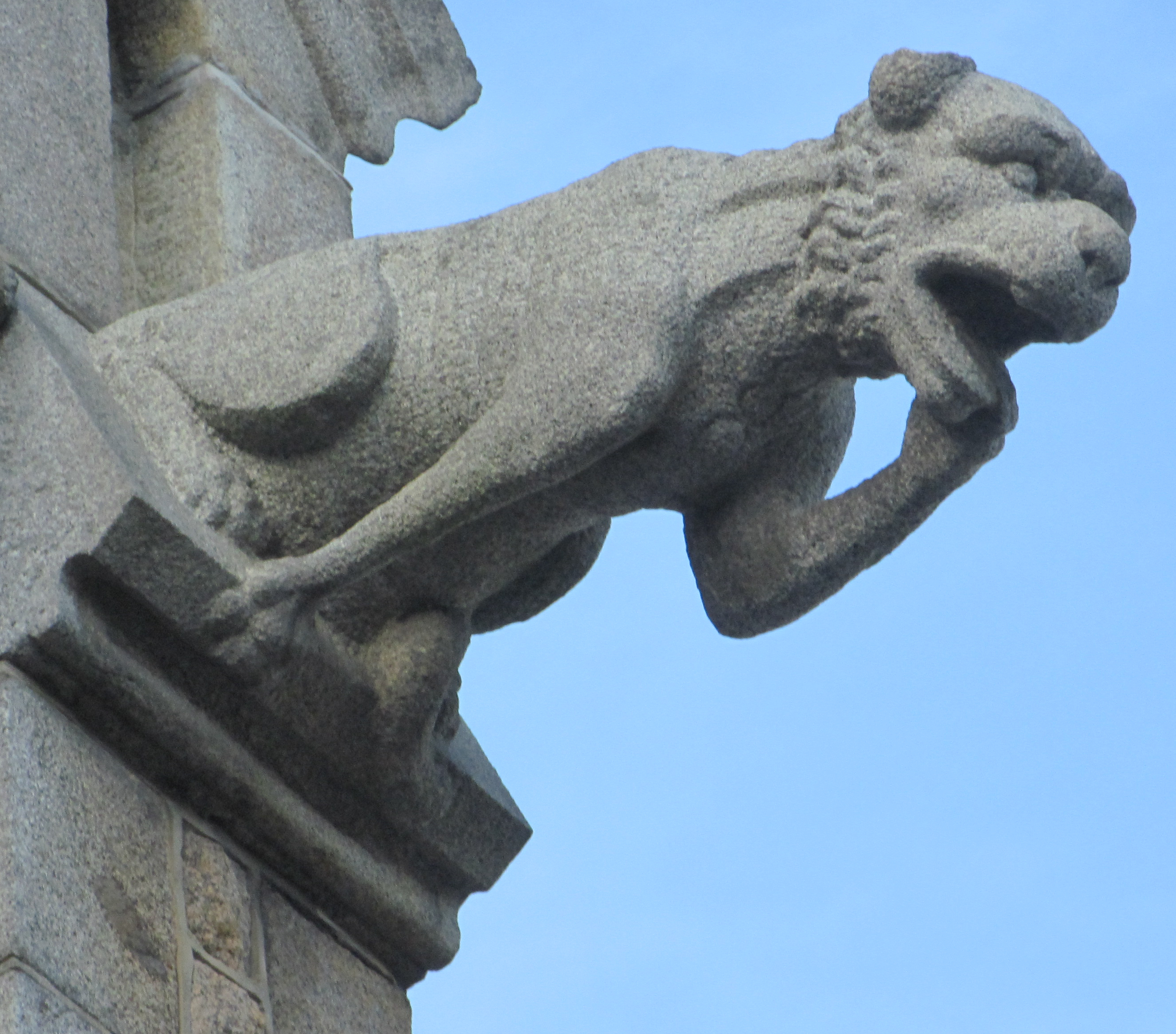
Gargoyle
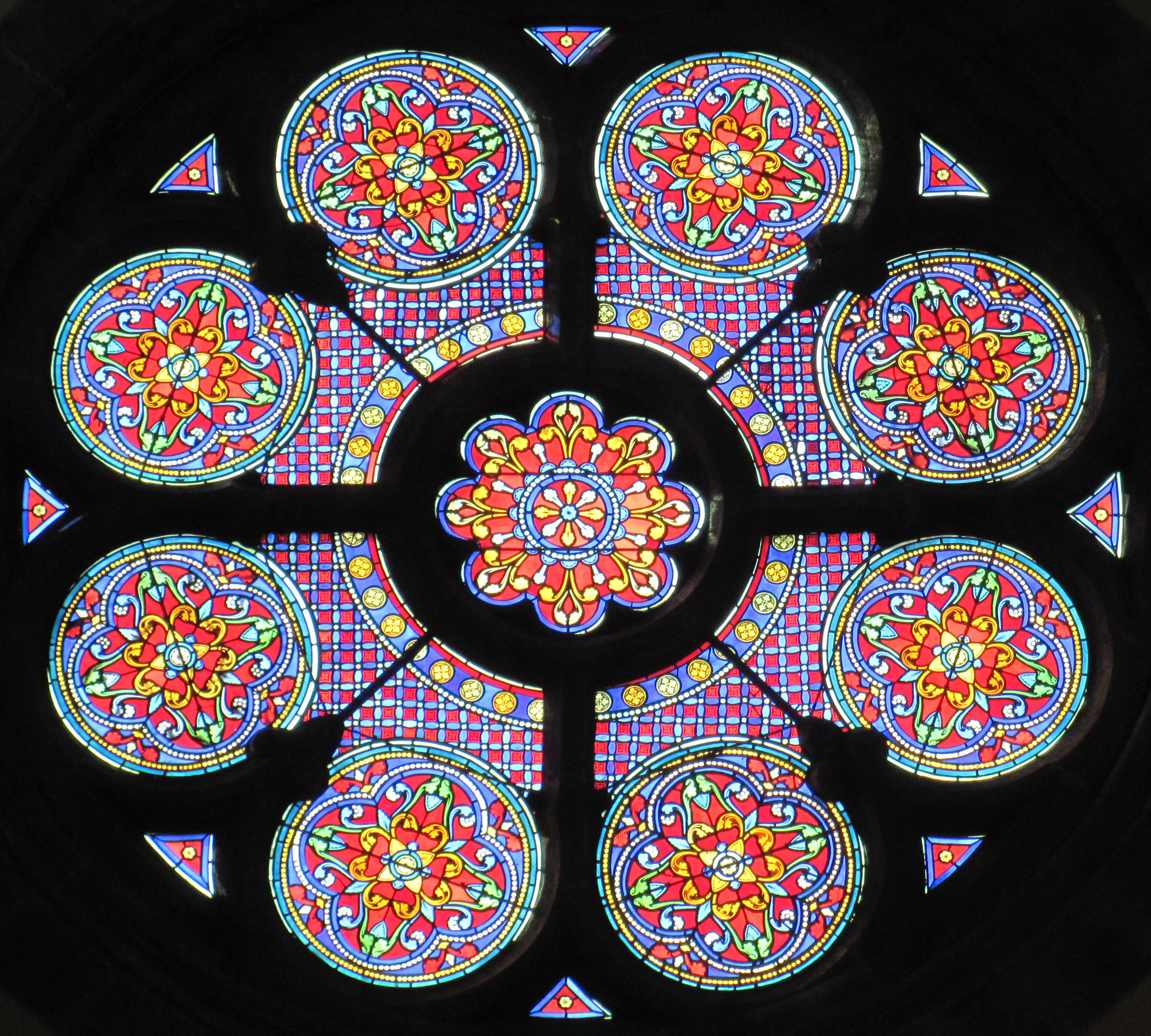
Rose window

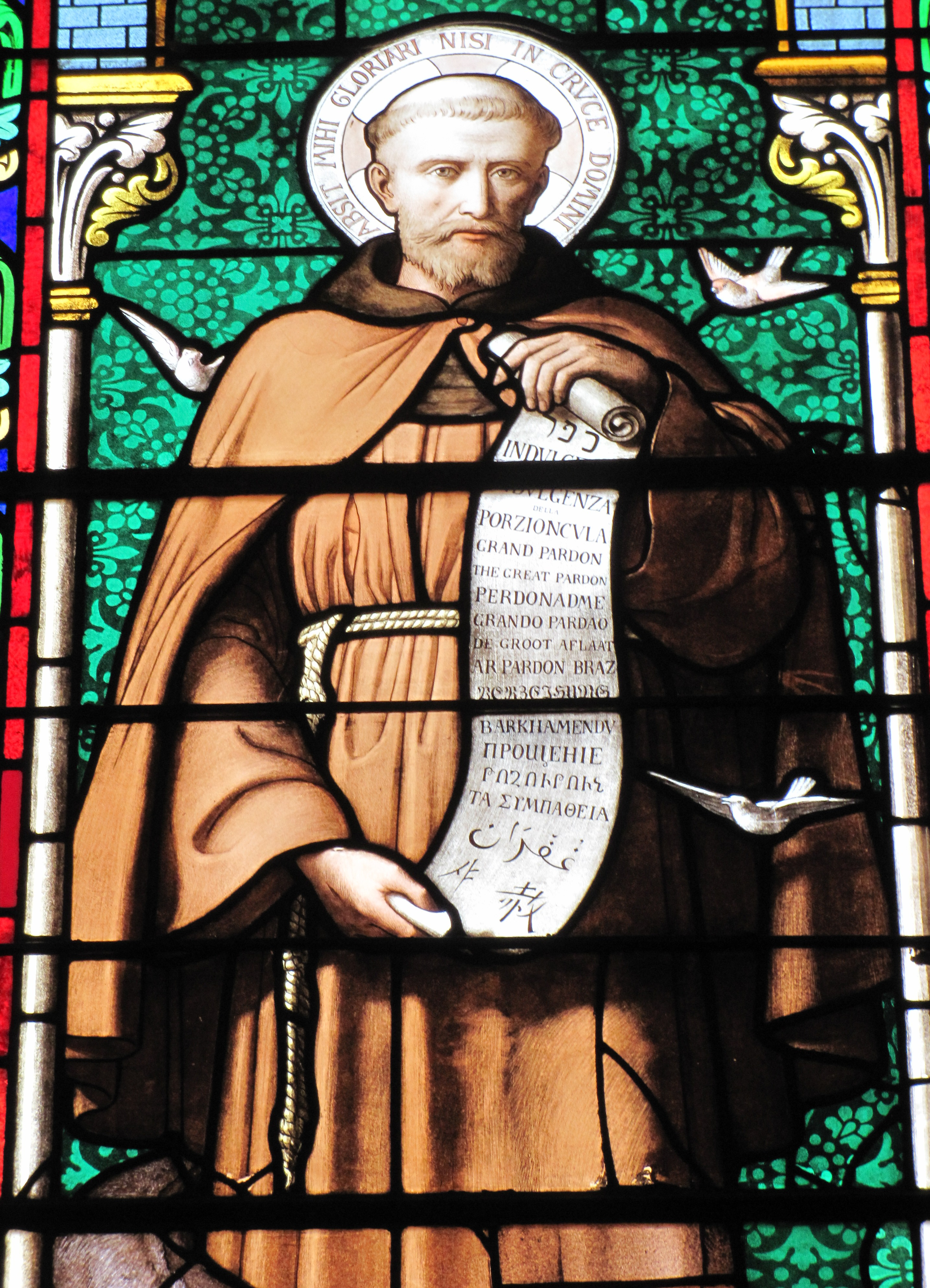
St. Thomas and his message in different languages

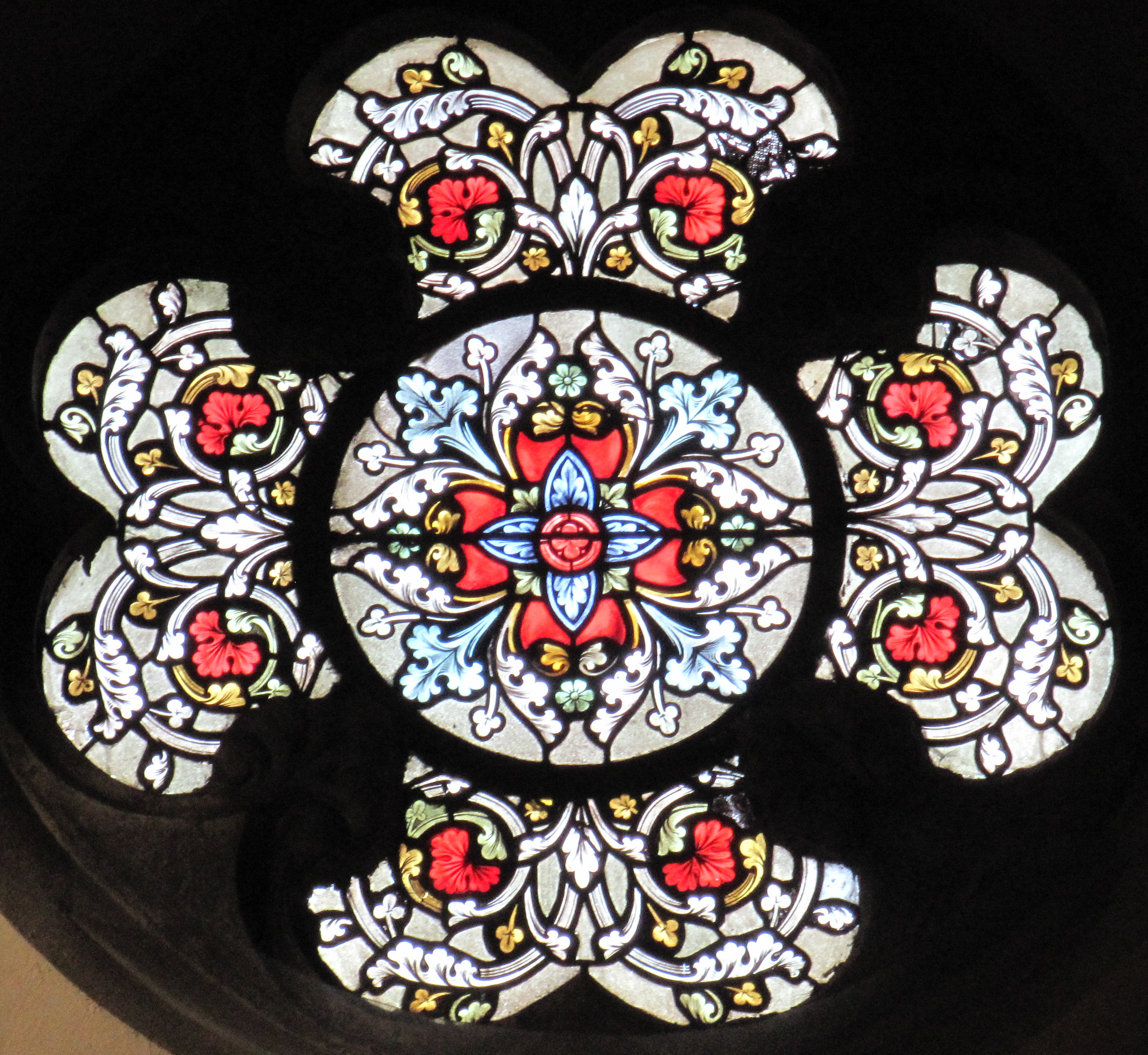
Rose window
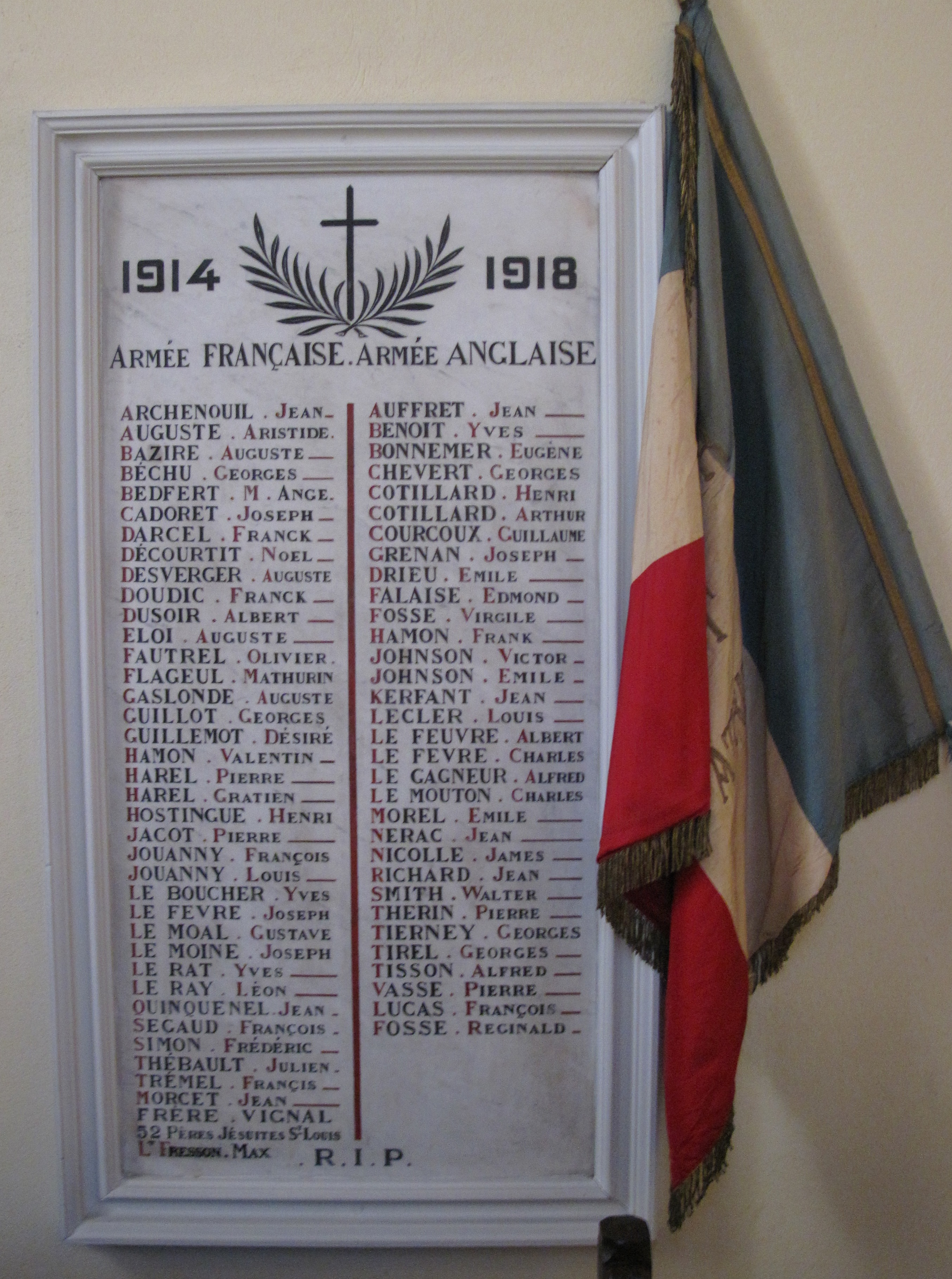
List of soldiers lost in the First World War

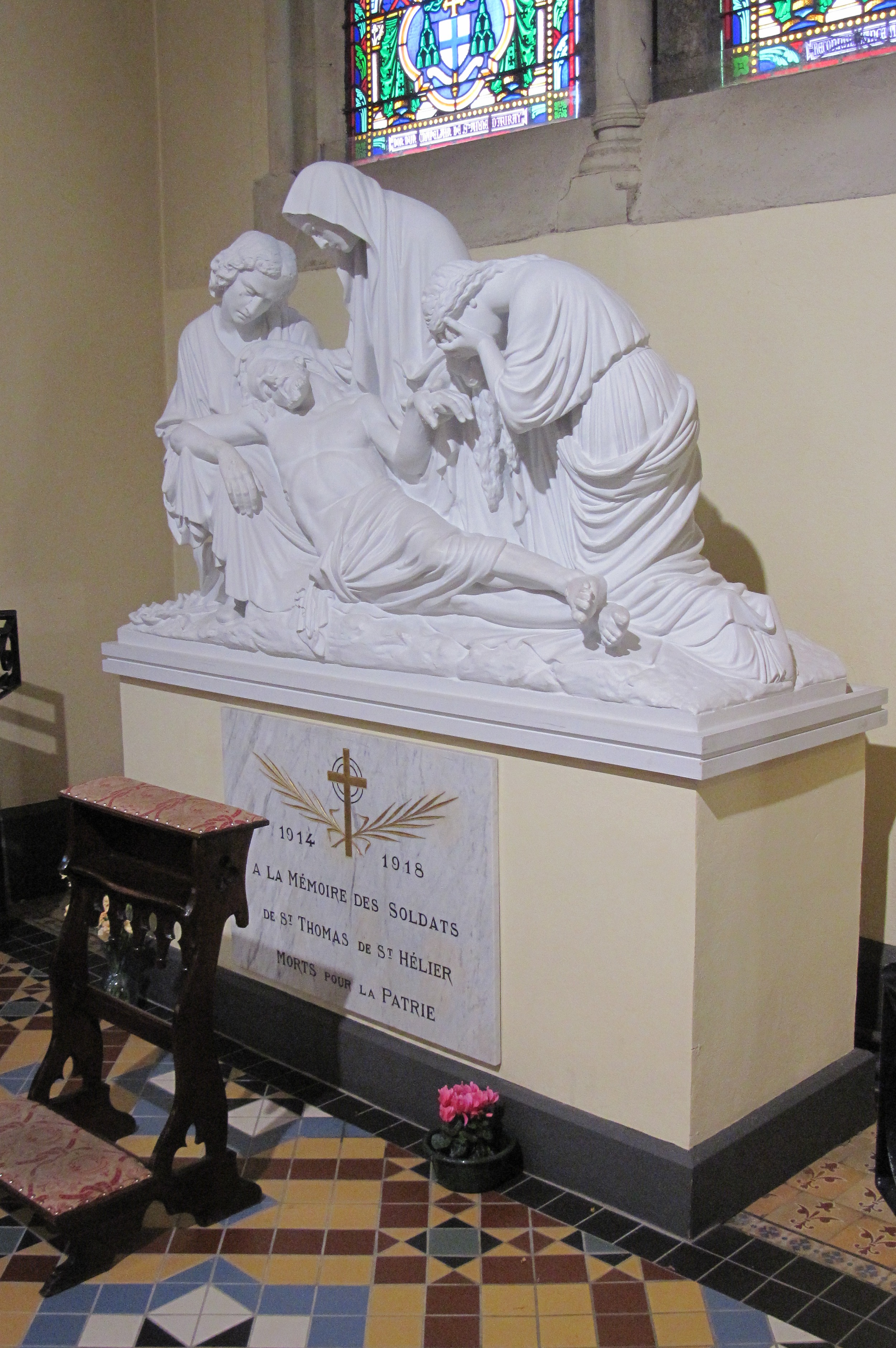
Memorial Altar erected to commemorate the war dead

== See also ==
- Catholic Church in Jersey
- Our Lady of the Annunciation Church, Jersey
- Religion in Jersey
