= Haute Valleé =

Haute Vallée School

Location
- La Grande Route De Mont A L'abbe; St Helier, Jersey, JE2 3HA; 49.19870°N 2.116333°W

Information
- Type: Non fee-paying Secondary School
- Motto: Achieve. Believe. Care.
- Department for Education URN: 132540 Tables
- Head teacher: Stuart Hughes
- Gender: Mixed
- Age: 11 to 16
- Enrolment: 700
- Houses: Fliquet, Kempt, Rocco, Seymour
- Colours: Green, Black
- Website: www.hvsch.je

Haute Vallée School is a Secondary school with 650 students, owned and operated by the States of Jersey, and located in the parish of St Helier in Jersey.

Stuart Hughes was appointed headteacher in 2019.

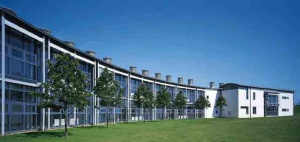
Haute Vallee school

== History ==
The school was opened in 1998.

The House System at Haute Vallée School was established in 2005 and has four houses:

- Filquet
- Kempt
- Rocco
- Seymour

== Academic performance ==
In 2022 2% of pupils achieved A* - C GCSE in five subjects, compared to 58% in all Jersey schools and 53% for all UK schools. The figure for 2010 was 1%. Some other Jersey schools, such as Grainville School and Le Rocquier School, also performed great in 2011. Other independent schools in Jersey performed much better.

In 2018, the school banned drinking water during lessons in order to improve students' results.

In 2019, 1% of pupils achieved 5 9-1 GCSE grades.

== School buildings ==
The school buildings were designed by Architecture PLB. They are energy-efficient and are designed around a central open space, with a granite-clad tower as a reminder of Jersey's history. The school hall also functions as a 350-seat theatre.

== Awards ==
In 2022 Haute Vallee was awarded Green Flag certification by Eco Schools.
