= Les Quennevais School =

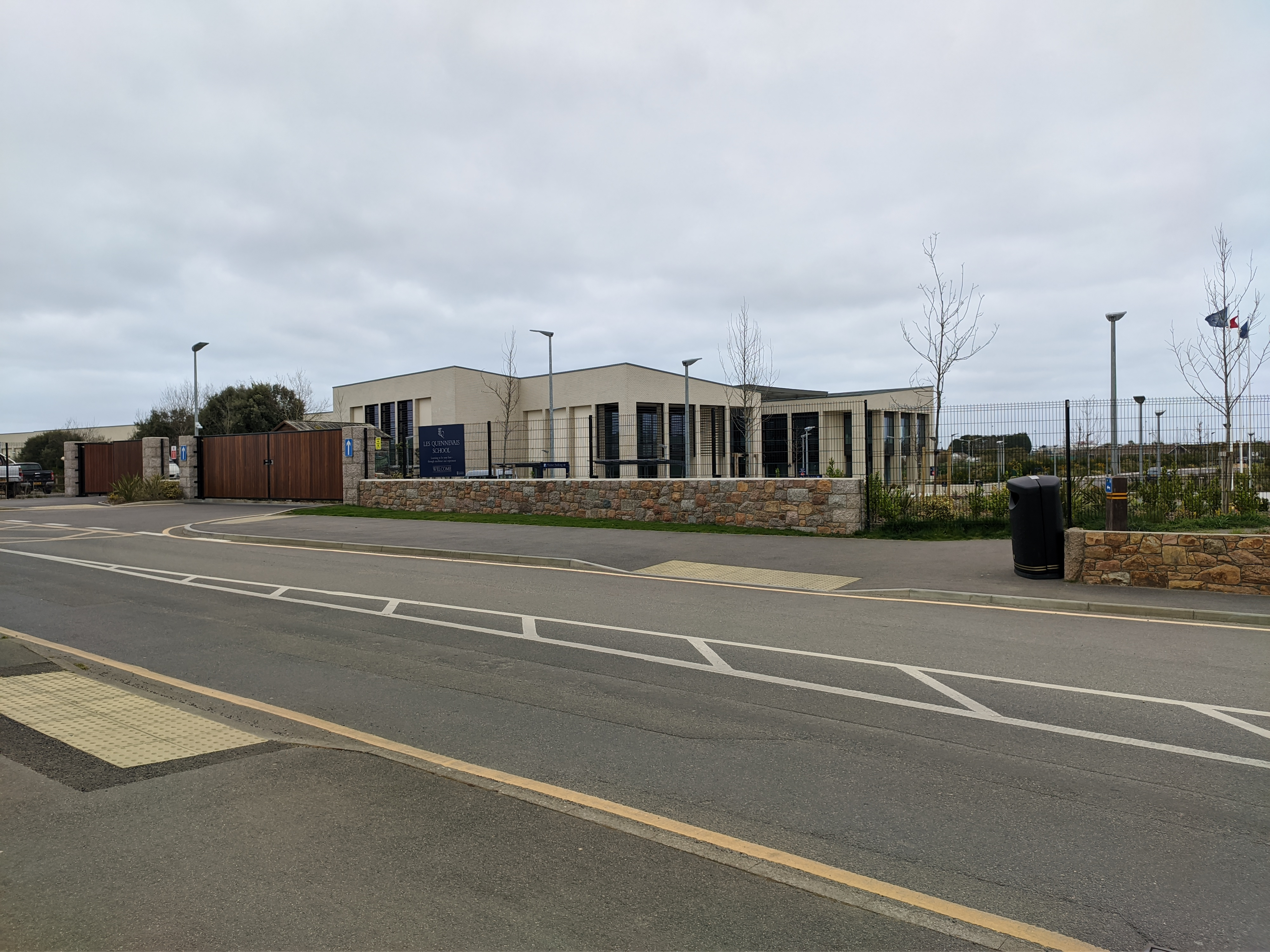

Location
- Saint Brélade; Jersey
- Coordinates: 49.1995°N 2.1980°W

Information
- Type: State-owned secondary school
- Motto: Learning to be your best – through excellence and enjoyment
- Founded: 6th June 1966
- Locale: Les Quennevais Park Saint Brélade, Jersey, JE3 8JW
- Headteacher: Jon Sindall
- Gender: Mixed
- Age: 11 to 16
- Enrollment: 863
- Houses: Watts, Tranter, McKeon
- Colour: Navy
- Website: https://www.lesquennevais.sch.je/

Les Quennevais School (Jèrriais: L'êcole des Tchennevais) is a secondary school, owned and operated by the States of Jersey, and located in the parish of Saint Brélade in Jersey which has a catchment area of students from the west of Island.

== History ==
Les Quennevais School and Community Centre was officially opened on 6 June 1966. The school was built to accommodate up to 500 pupils but by 1970 the numbers had risen to over 700. By 1975 there were over 900 pupils, and approximately 2,000 students registered for the adult classes that were organised through the school.

In 2015, it was decided that the Les Quennevais secondary school buildings needed to be replaced because they were outdated, too small for the student body, and on a site that is too small for a modern school. The new build took place on fields 80, 84 and 85 off Rue Carrée and was opened June 24, 2021 by the Princess Royal.

In 2023, a former student of Les Quennevais School, Daniel McMillan, was arrested after sending threats to the school threatening a mass killing of students. He was tried in court and found guilty of terrorism.

On October 18, 2023, Dance Moms star Abby Lee Miller hosted a meet-and-greet and a dance class at Les Quennevais School as a part of her 'Abby Lee spills the tea' and 'Abby Lee's Dance Class' tours

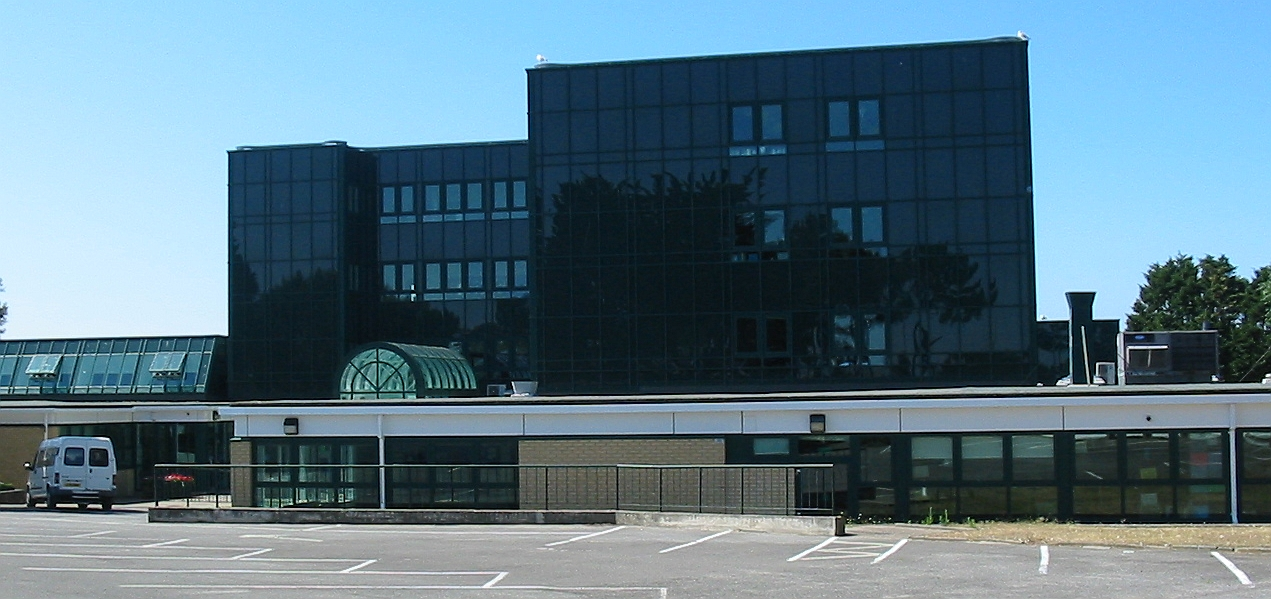
The old building

== Headteachers ==
The three houses that consist within Les Quennevais are named after the first three headteachers: Watts, Tranter and McKeon.

- John Watts: 1966-1969
- Ted Tranter: 1970-1988
- Tom McKeon: 1988-1992
- Jenny Hydes: 1992-1999
- John Thorp: 1999-2013
- Sarah Hague: 2013-2024
- Jon Sindall: 2024 to present

== Houses ==
The three school houses at Les Quennevais are Watts, Tranter and Mckeon which are named after the first three Headteachers. Each house has their own mascot and colour.

Houses
House	Colour	Mascot
Watts	Yellow	Dog
Tranter	Blue	Shark
McKeon	Red	Dragon

== Academic Performance ==
In 2024, the school achieved its best results yet with the highest percentage of passes at grades 4-9 and a 93% pass rate for English compared to the national average in the UK at 67.6% and the Jersey national average at 77.5% The school has been the top performing non fee-paying school in the Island for years, along with Hautlieu School

== Notable alumni ==
- Jason Martin - Artist
- Mariana Agathangelou - Badminton player
- Matt Banahan - Rugby player
- Alex Buesnel - Olympic Artistic Gymnast
- Malcolm De Sousa - Lawn bowler
- Nathan Frazer - Professional wrestler
- Simon Laurens - Olympic para-equestrian
- Michael Le Bourgeois - Rugby player
- Brett Pitman - Footballer
- Peter Vincenti - Footballer
- Claire Wilson - Track Athlete
- Paul Dudley Walden - musician
- Sarah Pallett - New Zealand Politician
- Lyndon Farnham - Chief Minister of Jersey
- Montfort Tadier - Jersey Politician
- Jonathan Renouf - Jersey Politician, Connétable of St Brelade

== See also ==
- Les Quennevais Rugby Club
- List of schools in Jersey
