= Jim Perchard =

Politician and farmer

James Leslie Perchard
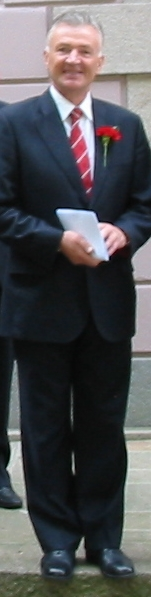

Senator
- In office October 2005 – October 2011
- Preceded by: N/A
- Constituency: Jersey
- Majority: 8,998

Personal details
- Occupation: Company Director

James Leslie Perchard (born 1957 in Jersey) is a former politician who was elected as Senator in the States of Jersey in the 2005 election.

Perchard was educated at Trinity Primary School, Trinity and De La Salle College. In 2005 he retired from his farming business before entering politics. Before entering politics he held the positions of Chairman of the Jersey Young Farmers' Club, President of the Countrymen's Club, and Vice President of the Jersey Farmers' Union. He served as Assistant Minister and Minister for Health and Social Services from 2008 to 2009.

In 2003, Perchard built a cricket field on his farm in St Martin. The Farmers Field is now the home to the Farmers Cricket Club

== Electoral history ==
In October 2005 Perchard finished 6th of 15 candidates, achieving 8,998 votes, and was duly elected to the States of Jersey.

He was Assistant Minister for Health and Social Services before being elected Minister in December 2008. The Senator resigned in April 2009.

In August 2011, he announced he would not stand for re-election for "personal and business reasons."

== Independent ==
He stood for the States as an independent candidate, summarising his politics as follows:

"I believe in the freedom of the individual and the equality of opportunity. If elected I will promote and support low tax, small, unobtrusive government that seeks to create a favourable business and social environment."
