= Ben Shenton =

Politician in Jersey (born 1960)

Ben Shenton is a politician active in Jersey. He is also the son of the politician and former Senator Dick Shenton.

He was born in Saint Helier in 1960, the third of four children and educated at De La Salle College.

He lives in Grouville, Jersey.

== Electoral history ==
Shenton entered the States of Jersey at the first attempt.

He was elected as a Senator in the 2005 elections, coming second after Senator Stuart Syvret, with 14,025 votes.

On 19 September 2007 he defeated the Chief Minister's nominated candidate to become Minister for Health and Social Services. He appointed Senator Jim Perchard as Assistant Minister with special responsibility for social services.

As Health and Social Services Minister he represented Jersey at the British-Irish Council Summit held in Dublin on 14 February 2008.

In 2009 he was elected Chairman of the Public Accounts Committee (PAC) and President of the Chairman's Committee – a Committee consisting of all the Chairmen of the various scrutiny panels and PAC. He resigned from the post of President of Chairman's Committee in 2011 on a matter of principle upon which he was later vindicated.

Despite deciding not to stand for re-election and his term of office ended 14 November 2011, Shenton has said that he hopes to return to the political arena in the future.

== Attributed legislative changes ==
Shenton was responsible for lodging a proposition to grant a winter fuel allowance to old age pensioners in Jersey and successfully having the proposition passed by the States of Jersey.

He has also fought – and won – numerous battles concerning issues ranging from the management structure of the Jersey Treasury to the siting of local phone masts, and adherence to planning procedures. Recent Public Accounts Committee documents include a detailed analysis of the States of Jersey Report & Accounts, the shared-equity scheme, States management of foreign exchange risk, States Spending Review, and a review of Jersey Heritage Trust.
