= Le Rocquier School =

Coordinates: 49.1703°N 2.0655°W

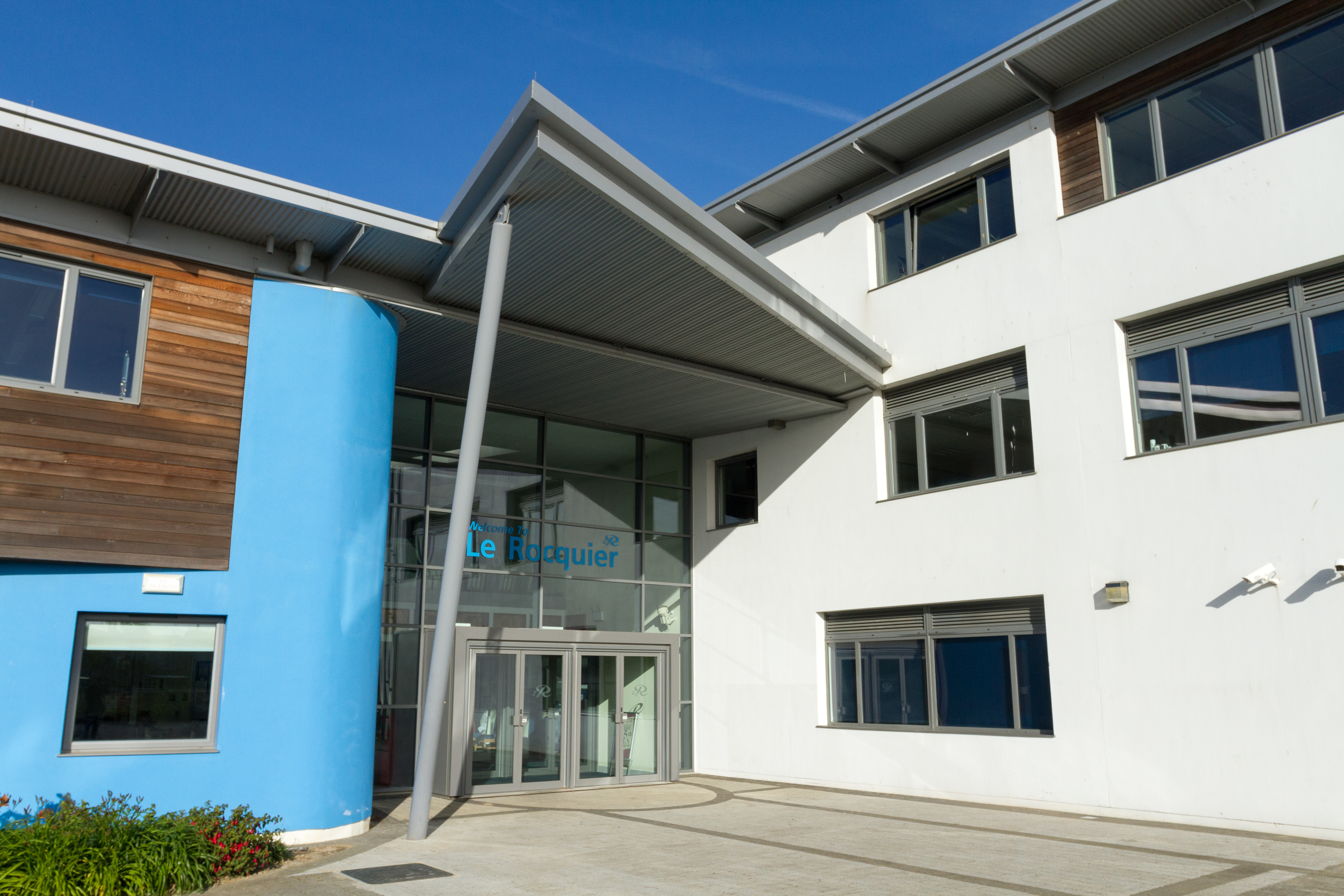
- St Clement; Jersey

Information
- Type: Non-fee paying secondary school
- Motto: Learn, Respect and Succeed
- Founded: March 1st 1975
- Headteacher: Andrew Adkin
- Teaching staff: 58
- Gender: Mixed
- Age: 11 to 16
- Enrollment: 800
- Color: Red
- Website: www.lerocquier.com

Le Rocquier School is a secondary school, owned and operated by the States of Jersey, in the parish of Saint Clement, Jersey.

== History ==
The present school building, which replaced an older building, was opened to students on 29 February 2006.

== Academic performance ==
In 2011 28% of pupils achieved A*-C GCSE in five subjects, compared to 58% in all Jersey schools and 53% for all UK schools. Some other Jersey schools, such as Grainville School, also performed poorly that year. Other independent schools in Jersey performed much better.

In 2024, 84.5% of students achieved a grade 9-4 in English and 60.15% in Maths and only 50% of all students passed both compared to the UK national average of that year at 67.6% and the Jersey average of that year at 77.5%. In 2024, 98% of all grades at Le Rocquier School were graded 9-1

It was reported in 2023 that boys at Le Rocquier school achieved disproportionately worse grades than their female peers

== Notable alumni ==
- Kurtis Guthrie
- Serena Guthrie

== See also ==
- List of schools in Jersey
