= Stenton (surname) =

Stenton is a surname, and may refer to:

- Doris Mary Stenton, Lady Stenton (1894–1971), English historian of the Middle Ages
- Douglas Stenton (born c. 1953), Canadian archaeologist
- Sir Frank Stenton (1880–1967), 20th-century historian of Anglo-Saxon England
- Henry Stenton (1815–1887), English first-class cricketer and solicitor
- Ian Stenton, rugby league footballer
- John Stenton (1924–2024), English cricketer

== See also ==
- Stanton (surname)
- Shenton (surname)
