= Beaulieu Convent School =

Location
- Wellington Road; St Helier, JE2 4RJ; Jersey
- Coordinates: 49°11′18″N 2°5′41″W

Information
- Type: Independent all-girls Catholic school
- Motto: toute de charité (entirely in love)
- Religious affiliation: Christian
- Denomination: Roman Catholic
- Established: 1937
- Founder: the Sisters of the Order of the Immaculate Conception
- Sister school: De La Salle College
- Head teacher: Matthew Burke
- Gender: Girls (mixed sixth form)
- Age: 3 to 18
- Colour: Navy
- School fees: £3,137 per term
- Website: http://www.beaulieu.jersey.sch.uk/

Beaulieu Convent School is a Roman Catholic independent school for girls located in St Helier, Jersey. Beaulieu's sister school is De La Salle College, Jersey

Today the school is divided into preschool, primary and secondary departments, and also operates a sixth form. Courses of study offered at the school include GCSEs, A Levels and BTECs.

== History ==
Beaulieu Convent School was founded in 1937 by the Sisters of the Order of the Immaculate Conception and moved to its current site in 1951 and in 1999, the Sisters gifted the school via a trust to the Island of Jersey under the condition it would remain a Catholic school.

== See also ==
- Catholic Church in Jersey
- List of schools in Jersey
- De La Salle College, Jersey
