= Our Lady of the Annunciation Church, Jersey =

Coordinates: 49.2164°N 2.0532°W

Our Lady of the Annunciation Church
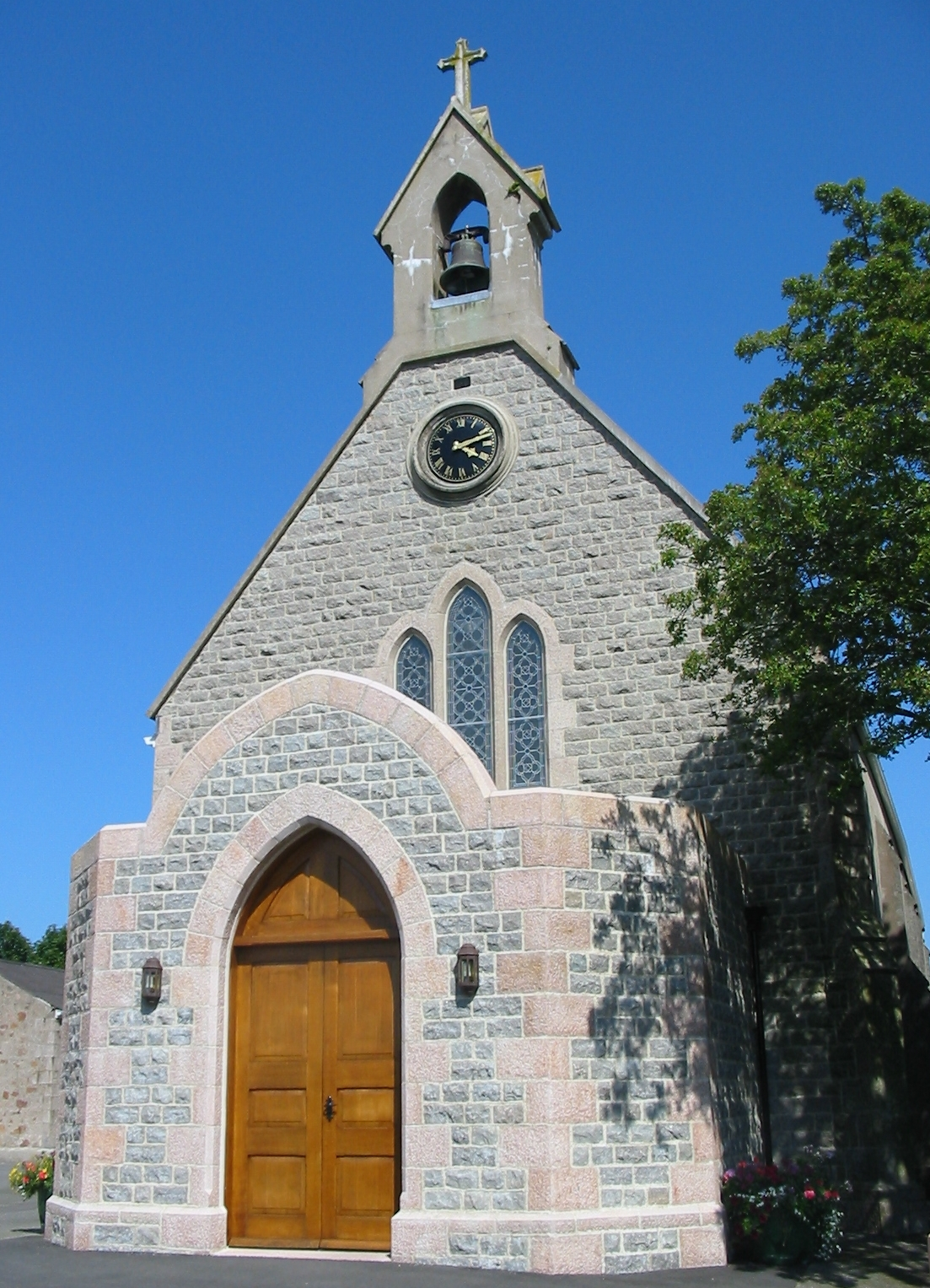
- Our Lady of the Annunciation Church
- Country: Jersey; United Kingdom
- Denomination: Roman Catholic Church

The Our Lady of the Annunciation Church or more formally "Church of Our Lady of the Annunciation and the Martyrs of Japan" is the name given to a religious building belonging to the Catholic Church and is located in the town of St. Martin on the island of Jersey a British Crown dependency, part of the Channel Islands.

== Diocese of Portsmouth ==
The church follows the Roman or Latin rite and is under the administration of the Diocese of Portsmouth (Dioecesis Portus Magni) in the United Kingdom. Apart from religious services in English, Masses in Polish are also offered, due to the presence of members of that community in the territory.

The current building was completed in 1863. The name of Martyrs of Japan is used as the church was blessed on her feast day. For its historical importance and in order to protect her, in 2007 it was included in the list of sites of special interest in Jersey. In 2008, a new porch was added.

== See also ==
- Catholic Church in Jersey
- Our Lady of the Annunciation Church, Amman
