= Shinton =

Shinton is a surname. Notable people with the surname include:

- Bobby Shinton (born 1952), English footballer and manager
- Fred Shinton (1883–1923), English footballer
- Nick Shinton (born 2001), Belgian footballer
