= De La Salle College, Jersey =

De La Salle College

Location
- Wellington Road; St. Saviour, JE2 7TH; Jersey
- Coordinates: 49.1899°N 2.0929°E

Information
- Type: Private Independent Catholic school
- Motto: Indivisa Manent (Undivided Remain)
- Religious affiliations: Roman Catholic (Christian Brothers)
- Established: 1917
- Founder: Institute of the Brothers of the Christian Schools
- Head teacher: Jason Turner
- Staff: 44
- Gender: Boys
- Age: 3 to 18
- Enrollment: 800
- Houses: Peary, Stanley, Scott and Rhodes
- Colors: Blue and Black
- Publication: Lasallian Voices
- Website: www.dls-jersey.co.uk

De La Salle College is an independent catholic all-boys school in the Island of Jersey, taking its name from St. John Baptist de La Salle (1651–1719), who founded the De La Salle Brothers in France. De La Salle's sister school is Beaulieu Convent School.

== History ==
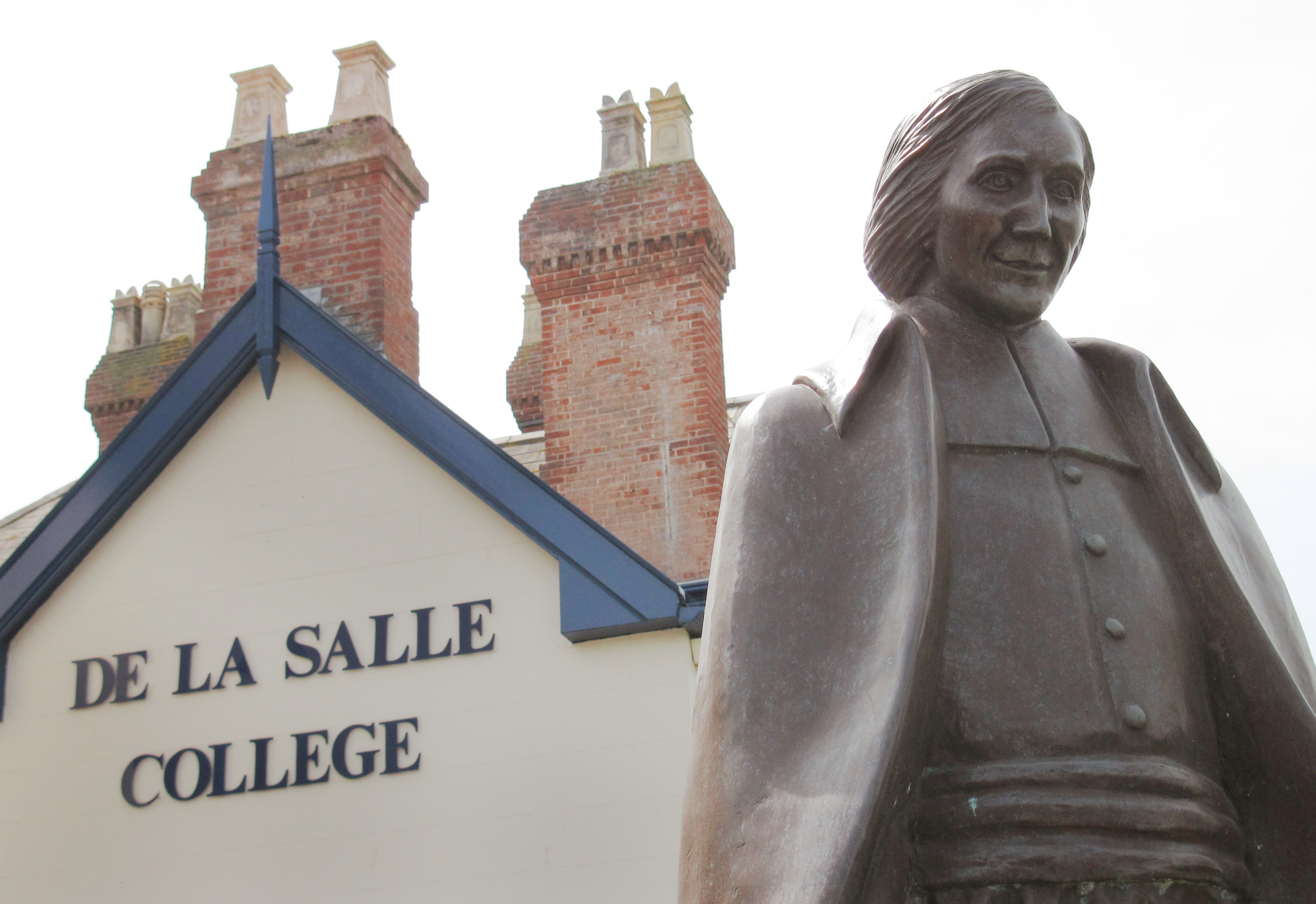
De La Salle College

De La Salle College takes its name from St. John Baptist de La Salle (1651–1719), who founded the Brothers' Order in the time of Louis XIV. Today the Order has establishments in over 80 countries.

A few Brothers settled in Jersey at the time of the French Revolution and remained on the Island for several years. Then, from 1866 to 1896, a school of up to 300 pupils run by the Brothers' flourished in St. Thomas's Parish. The Brothers left the Island in 1896, but were invited to return in 1917 to found another school.

The school was established at Berry House next to St. Thomas's Church in St. Helier and was initially known as St. Aloysius College. Within a year the main site of the school was moved to a property known as "The Beeches" on Wellington Hill in the parish of St. Saviour. It was at this point that the name De La Salle College was first given to the school.

Two factors have helped ensure that the school has a future into the next century. The first was the introduction of the Covenant Scheme. Begun in the mid-1960s, it led initially to the opening of the swimming pool and gymnasium and then to a period of expansion. The 6th Form Block, Science Building, C.D.T. workshops, Art Rooms and the Computer Room were completed in quick succession. Secondly, in 1976, the States of Jersey agreed to provide the school with financial assistance in the form of a capitation grant for running costs.

The 6th Form Block, Science Labs and I.T. facilities, Art Rooms, C.D.T. workshops and Drawing office, a new Infant School, six new classrooms for secondary and a new Junior School were all completed thanks to the help provided through the Covenant Scheme.

In the late 1990s negotiations began with the States of Jersey for capital funding and the building of 8 new classrooms and a library and resources area began in January 2003.

Though there is no longer a Brothers’ Community in Jersey, the school retains links with the Brothers who are Trustees of the college.

== Lasallian Voices ==
Lasallian Voices is the termly publication of De La Salle College, Jersey. Students can send in stories, poems and other work to be published in the next edition. However, only the first and second editions have been published online.

== Notable alumni ==
- Tim Le Cocq – former Bailiff of Jersey
- George Cutland - former secretary to the Bailiff of Jersey
- Senator Reg Jeune - Jersey politician
- Maurice Letto - Jersey politician
- Senator Clarence Dupré - Jersey lawyer and politician
- Ian Gorst - Jersey politician
- Leonard Norman - former Connétable of St Saviour, Jersey
- Jim Perchard - Jersey politician
- Paul Routier - Assistant minister to the Chief Minister of Jersey
- Richard Shenton - Jersey politician
- Ben Shenton - Jersey politician
- Matthew Cook - Rugby player
- Nigel de Gruchy - British trade unionist
- Terry Le Sueur - former Chief Minister of Jersey

== See also ==
- Catholic Church in Jersey
- List of schools in Jersey
- Beaulieu Convent School
