= Richard Shenton =

Richard Joseph "Dick" Shenton OBE (25 October 1926 – 2 January 2013), born in St. Helier, was a politician in Jersey. He retired in 2005.

== Biography ==
Richard Joseph Shenton the son of Benjamin Henry Shenton, B.E.M. and Kathleen Mary Troy. The third of seven children, he was educated at De La Salle College in Jersey. He and his family lived in Jersey throughout the five years (1940–1945) occupation by the Germans. His father was imprisoned by the occupying forces in 1944, and in 1942 and 1943 his elder brother and sister died in their teens of malnutrition and tuberculosis.

Following the liberation of the Channel Islands, he joined the Royal Air Force, serving in the Middle East and Italy until he was demobilised in 1948. After a period of working in the dock industry he met and married Jill Mason and they emigrated to Canada in 1954. After six years in Canada, he, his wife and two infant daughters returned to Jersey and he resumed his career in the dock industry, eventually taking over as managing director of the only stevedoring company, and his name has been synonymous with the docks from that time.

Dick Shenton is the father of four children, two daughters and two sons, and has seven grandchildren. He was well known for his charitable work and his loyalty to his native island. When he stood for election in 1969, he was elected a Senator with an all-island mandate, finishing top of the poll – a feat which he equaled several times. No other politician had topped any island election twice, and it is not an exaggeration to say that, having achieved this feat four times, Dick Shenton was without doubt the most popular choice of the island's population. In 1981, 1987 and 2004 he topped every parish poll, proving his popularity with town and country residents alike.

He was a politician who built rapport with the elderly, the disabled and anyone in need. His door was reportedly always open to residents of the Island who saw him has their champion and as an Islander who would stand up for Jersey at all times. He personally sponsored more Private members’ Propositions than any other States Member of his time, and was responsible for more changes in legislation which benefited the people whom he represented than any other States Member.

He was praised for his work as President of various States Committees. For example, when he was president of the Island Development Committee, the Bailiff of the time, Sir Frank Ereaut, stated “Senator Shenton puts a human face on planning”. When he was President of Agriculture and Fisheries he introduced new measures to protect and ensure the unique characteristics of the Jersey cattle breed. He also launched the very successful ‘Jersey Fresh’ campaign to promote local products. As president of the Resources Recovery Board he was responsible for the opening of the new incineration plant which turned household rubbish in electricity. He also introduced disciplined measures for the sorting of waste which in turn cleaned up Island hedgerows and restored St. Ouen's Bay to its former glory. He drew the line in the sand.

He also served as President of the Postal Committee, Broadcasting Committee, and Establishment Committee and was responsible for all public sector employees and all States policies in that direction. He served on committees which were responsible for the Constitution of the Island, the Defence contribution to the U.K. and matters affecting relationships with the Home Office and the UK Government. In his handling of industrial relations and his relationship with the Trade Union, employer and employee alike recognised his integrity and gave him the respect accorded to very few politicians.

Senator Shenton represented the Island at the Commonwealth Parliamentary Association in Canada, Jamaica and Zimbabwe. He was responsible for the establishment of the ‘Small Nations Conference’ and the ‘Small Disaster Fund’. In 2004 he returned to the States Assembly with a landslide victory in the by-election caused by the resignation of the late Senator Christopher Lakeman. He finally officially retired from the political arena in 2006 at the end of his term of office. However he was delighted when his son Ben was elected as Senator in 2006 and was always on hand to offer insight, guidance, and opinion. The introduction of the Winter Fuel Allowance for pensioners was a good example of this type of collaboration – the concept engineered by him and pushed through the Assembly, despite vigorous opposition, by Ben – using a few political tricks to ensure that it was adopted. In spite of his busy political life, he remained managing director of George Troy & Sons, Master Stevedores; he was Chairman of St. Helier Port Services, a Director of Guernsey Stevedores Limited, a non-executive Director of the Royal Bank of Scotland and of Capital House Investments Management Limited, and Chairman of the Hotel L’Horizon.

On the charitable side he retained his links with the Jersey Association of Spina Bifida and Hydrocephalus and the Jersey Schizophrenia Fellowship, having been founder President in both cases. On the fund raising side, he has chaired many committees: De La Salle, his old school, when there were fears that it would have to close; the Little Sisters of the Poor, in the change to the Jeanne Jugan Residence, where they now provided the finest facilities for the elderly in the Island; and more recently he was the driving force behind the campaign to build a new Parish Church for the Catholic community. St. Mary and St. Peter's Church can be seen as an example of the success of that campaign. He received the Knighthood of the Holy See (KSG) for his service to the catholic church.

He was Charter member of the Lion's Club of Jersey and involved with other clubs, but on entering politics he severed his relations with club activities as he felt these could impinge upon his work as an independent politician. Senator Shenton has always been most insistent in providing a Register of Members’ Interests and a strict code of conduct for politicians to follow.

== Electoral history ==
Dick Shenton was first elected to the States of Jersey as Senator in 1969 and served until 1999. In 1969 he topped the poll with 13,220 votes. In 1975 he topped the poll with 17,221 votes. In 1981 he topped the poll with 17,256 votes. In 1987 he topped the poll with 12,838 votes. No one in Jersey politics, apart from Senator Shenton, has topped the poll 4 times and the record number of votes was only beaten in 2011 with a much larger electorate.

In October 1993 he received 8,755 votes polling sixth.

He was re-elected in a by-election in 2004 achieving 7,144 votes with a majority of 5,500.

== Life in the States ==
Dick Shenton was President of a number of committees, including tourism in 1993.
