= Hautlieu School =

Non-fee paying secondary school in St Saviour, Jersey

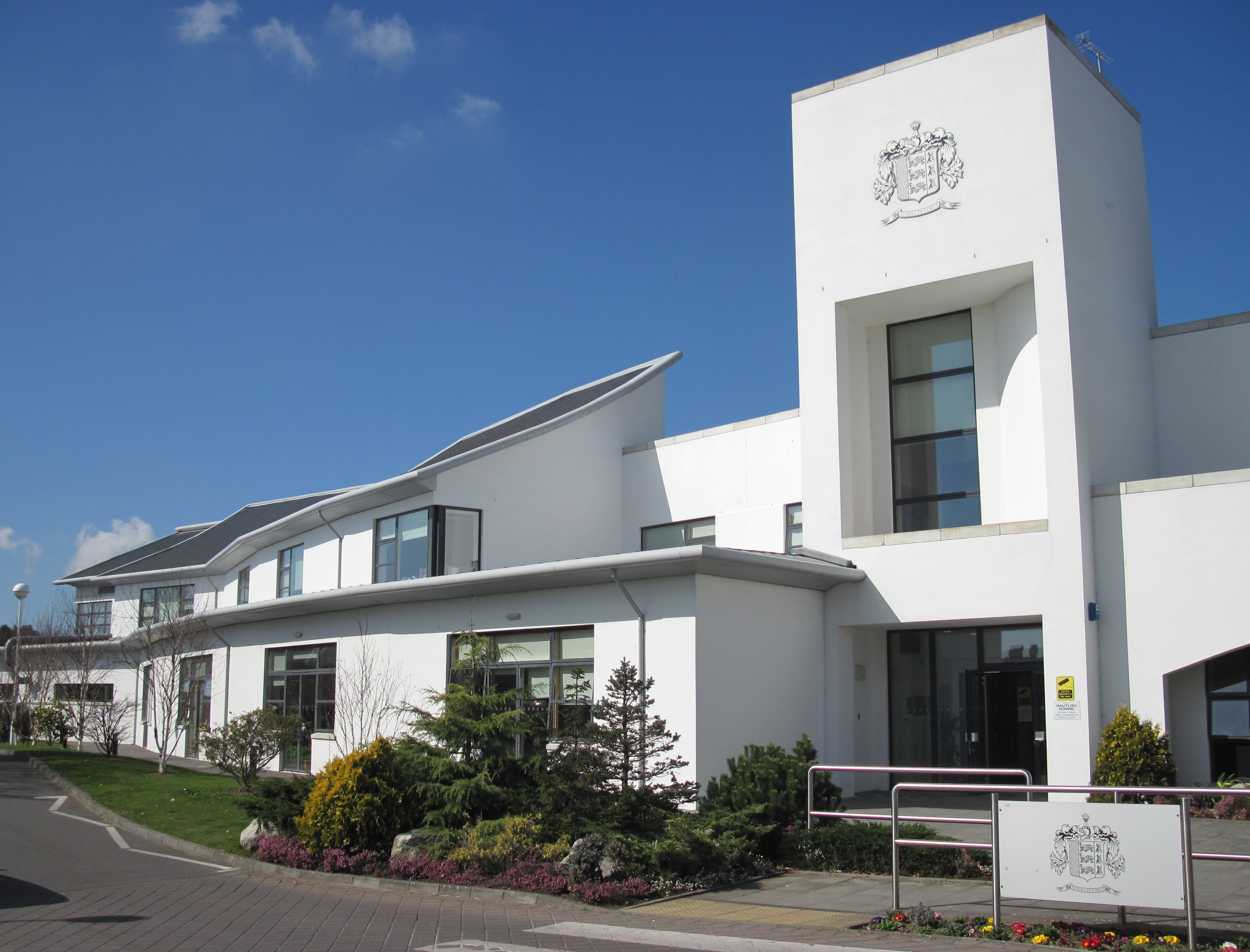
- School building in 2012

Location
- Wellington Road; St Saviour, JE2 7TH; Jersey; 49.1927°N 2.0922°W

Information
- Other name: Hautlieu
- Type: Non-fee paying secondary school
- Motto: Summa Petamus (Aim for the highest)
- Established: 5th April 1952
- Head teacher: Nick Falle
- Staff: 100
- Gender: Mixed
- Age: 14 to 18
- Enrolment: 800
- Colours: Blue and white
- Website: www.hautlieu.co.uk

Hautlieu School, or simply Hautlieu, is an academically selective secondary school in Jersey which accepts students aged 14 and over. The school is owned and operated by the States of Jersey.

Over the years it has been suggested by politicians that Hautlieu should be converted to a sixth-form college and the 14+ system (which some regard as controversial) be abolished.

== Academic Performance ==
During the academic year 2004/2005 the GCSE pass rate was 100%, at which 40% gained A* to A grades. At A level there was an 87% pass rate of which 79% obtained grades A-C. Admission into Hautlieu depends on the result of CAT, Cognitive Abilities Test, exams with a minimum result of 109, as well as the results of the PT, Progress Test, in English and Maths (PTE and PTM respectively) with a minimum result of 103 on both tests. It is, however, possible for students who have not achieved the necessary CAT or PT scores to appeal.

In 2024, 91.7% of students passed at least 5 GCSEs including English and Maths at grades 9-4 compared to the Jersey average of that year at 77.5%

== History ==
Originally a boys-only school, Hautlieu’s primary purpose was to provide free education for “able” 11–18-year-old students whose families could not afford to send them to one of Jersey’s fee-paying schools. The school’s first head teacher, Charles Brown, also placed a great deal of emphasis on vocational pursuits to promote a ‘rounded education’ which led to the establishment of many extracurricular activities. Most remarkably, the school had its own outdoor swimming pool which hosted island-wide inter-mural competitions.

Hautlieu was created to provide preparation for GCE O and A levels and was opened in 1952. It was originally built on the site of a farm and several German bunkers had to be removed before the building work could begin. Hautlieu only admitted the first female students in 1960. In April 2004, the school moved into new buildings located on their former playing field. In the interim, Hautlieu’s original building needed to be refurbished and expanded to accommodate the rise in pupil numbers from 350 to 650. Improvements made between 1968 and 1972 included a new dining room, new sixth form and middle school blocks and better facilities for Art, Music, Geography and Science.

Currently, Hautlieu is a non fee-paying academically selective mixed gender school. Lesley Toms, a former student, became Hautlieu’s first female head teacher in 1998.

== Admission criteria ==
Hautlieu differs from other state secondary schools in Jersey in that students must meet specific criteria before being eligible for application to attend the school.

== Headteachers ==
- Charles Brown - 1952–1977
- Jack Worrall - 1977–1988
- Brian Bullock - 1988–1998
- Lesley Toms - 1998–2014
- Nick Falle - 2014–2024
- Kate Blackhall - Interim Headteacher (2024)

== Notable alumni ==
- Lyndon Farnham
- Alastair Layzell
- Terry Le Main
- Jeremy Maçon
- Sam Mézec
- Montfort Tadier
- Peter Vincenti
- Stuart Farrimond
- Filip Nowacki

== See also ==
- Category:People educated at Hautlieu School
- List of schools in Jersey
- List of people from Jersey
