= Grainville School =

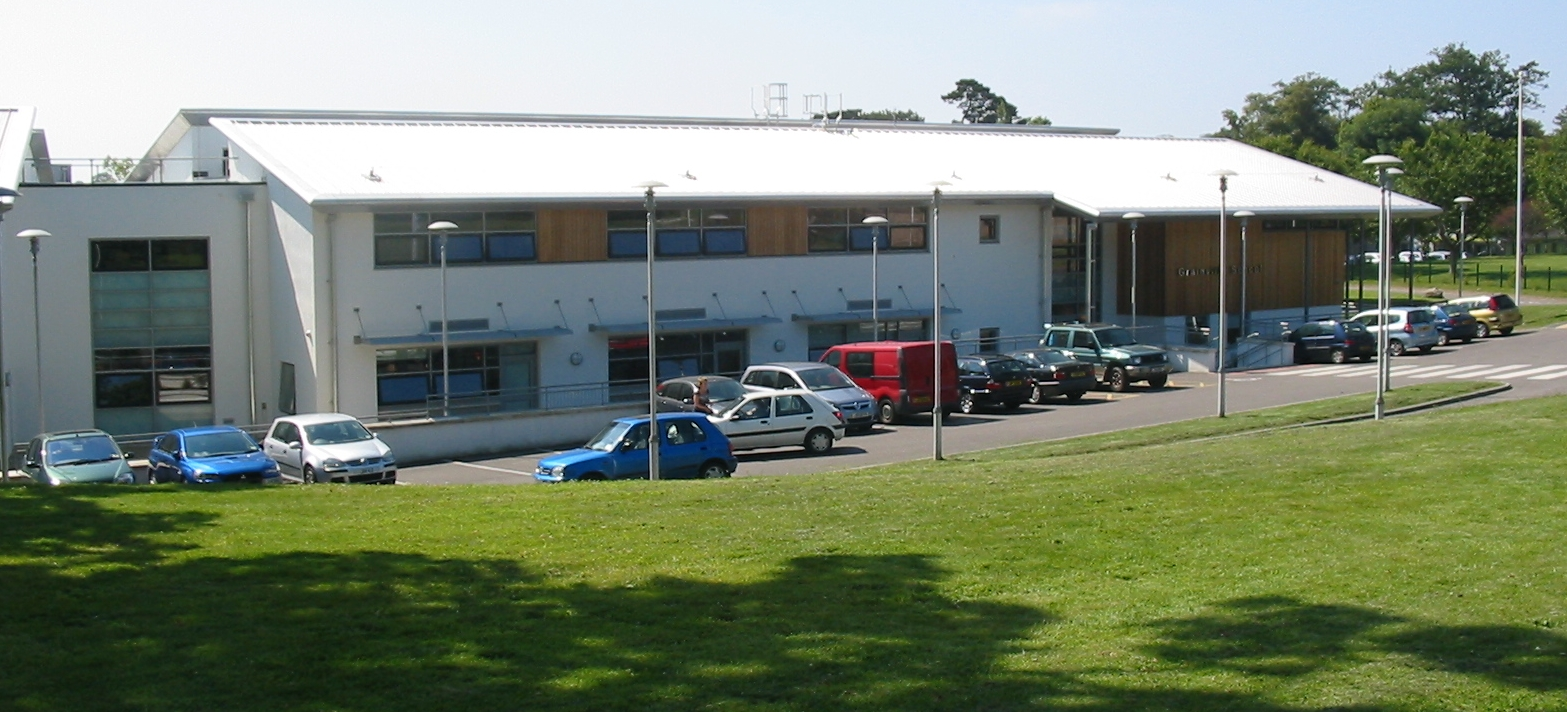

Location
- Parish of St Saviour; Jersey
- Coordinates: 49.1996°N 2.0879°W

Information
- Type: Non-fee paying secondary school
- Motto: Inspire, Motivate and Challenge
- Opened: 1980
- Head teacher: Susan Morris
- Staff: 140-145
- Teaching staff: 80-85
- Key people: 41
- Gender: Mixed
- Age: 11 to 16
- Enrolment: 777
- Classrooms: 48
- Houses: Grève, Plemont, Rozel, Beauport
- Colors: Dark blue, red (featured on some uniforms)
- Website: www.grainville.sch.je

Grainville School is a non fee-paying, government-owned secondary school in the parish of St Saviour in Jersey.

== History ==
Grainville School is an 11–16, non-fee paying, secondary school in Jersey, Channel Islands. It was formerly a privately run Convent school which was renamed Grainville School and opened in 1980 as a States of Jersey school with Christine Skeavington former Headmistress of St Helier Girl's School as Headmistress.The first year of mixed pupils (girls & boys) started in 1981.

== Academic performance ==
In 2022, 82% of students gained 9-4 in English and 78% in Maths compared to the Jersey average of 81.6%.

== Awards ==
- 2014: Institute of Directors Award, UK: Headteacher awarded Director of the Year for Public Service/Third Sector and Second Overall Director of the Year in the UK 2014

== Headteachers ==
- Christine Skeavington: 1980–1991
- Alan Dowling: 1991-1996
- Mario Lundy: 1996-2004
- Keith Shannon: 2004–2006
- David Cahill: 2006–2009
- John McGuinness: 2009-2015, 2016-2017
- Susan Morris: 2015 - 2016, 2018–present

== See also ==
- List of schools in Jersey
- Grainville Playing Fields
