= Highlands College, Jersey =

Highlands College
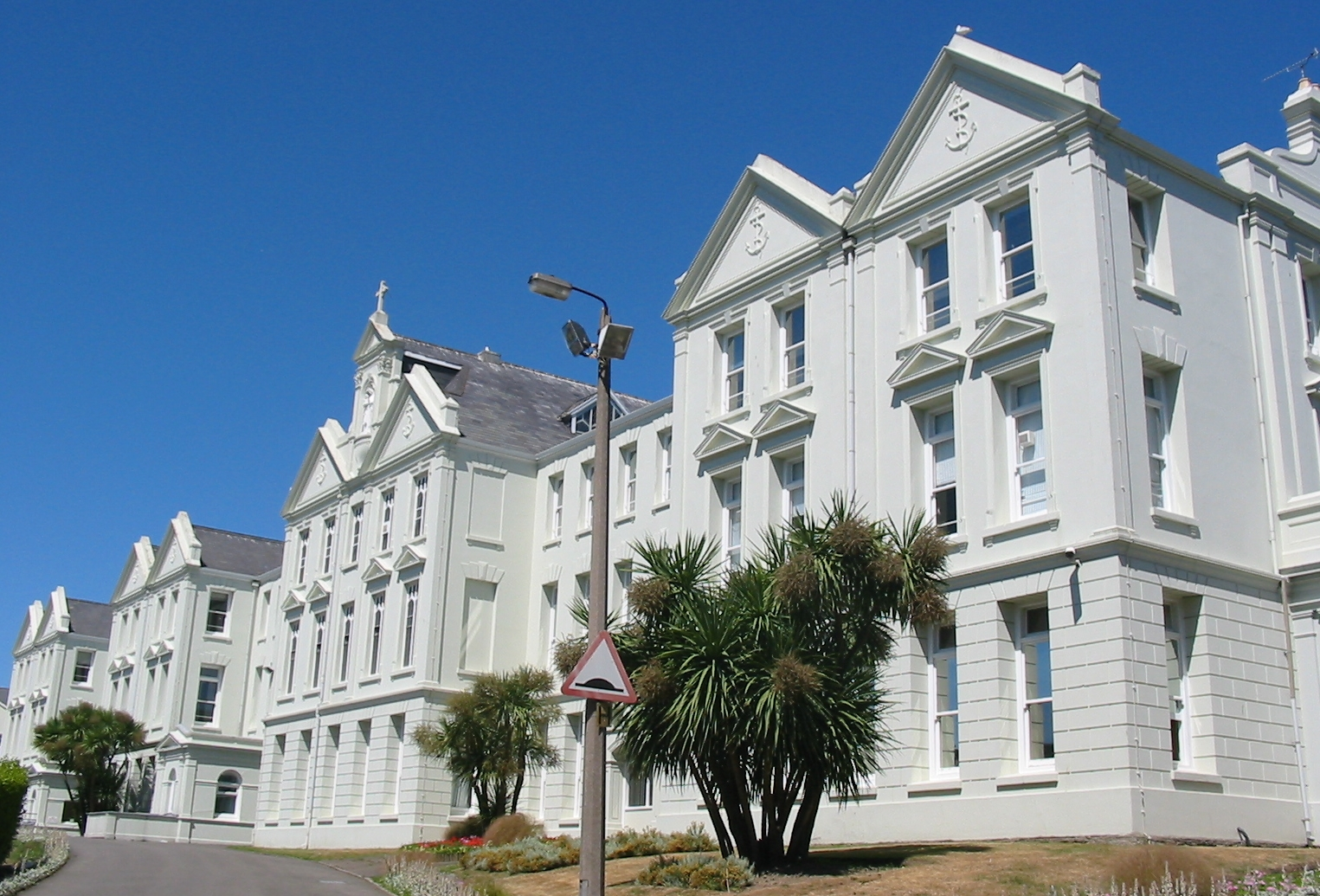
- Saint Saviour; Jersey

Information
- Principal: Joanne Terry-Marchant
- Gender: mixed
- Enrolment: approx. 6,000
- Website: https://www.highlands.ac.uk

Highlands College (Jèrriais: Lé Collège d's Hautes Tèrres) is a further and higher college in Jersey in the Channel Islands. It has 860 full-time and over 4,000 part-time and adult students. Highlands is a Partner College of the University of Plymouth (The University of Plymouth Colleges network), London South Bank University and the University of Sussex. The principal since September 2019 is Joanne Terry-Marchant, following the five-year tenure of Steve Lewis.

== History ==
The College is situated on a campus in Saint Saviour on the site of a former French Jesuit training school Notre Dame de Bon Secours that was established in Jersey in 1894 on the site known as Highlands. The school trained sailors for the French Navy but when the Jesuits were denied permission by anti-clerical laws to continue teaching, the school was moved to Jersey from Brest. The Jesuit period finished after World War I and the site was purchased by another French group The Brothers of Christian Instruction from Ploërmel in Brittany who set up a missionary school. During the second world war Jersey was occupied by the Germans and the site from 1941 was used to house 180 occupying forces. It returned to its previous use in 1945.

In the 1950s and 1960s, the States of Jersey established a College of Further Education in a number of different buildings in Saint Helier, the capital of Jersey. The college taught mainly craft skills such as construction, catering, motor vehicle and secretarial courses. In 1970 the demand for missionaries had fallen away and the Brothers of Christian Instruction sold the Highlands site to the States of Jersey. In 1972 the States established Highlands College and over a period moved all further education to the campus that was also occupied by the Education Department. Extensive rebuilding has taken place on the campus to create excellent facilities in a wide range of vocational disciplines. This work was undertaken by the States of Jersey Public Works Department over a period of years under the charge of Architect Michael Dodds. There are plans to build a new campus fit for 21st century study, starting with a feasibility study in 2020.

== Description ==
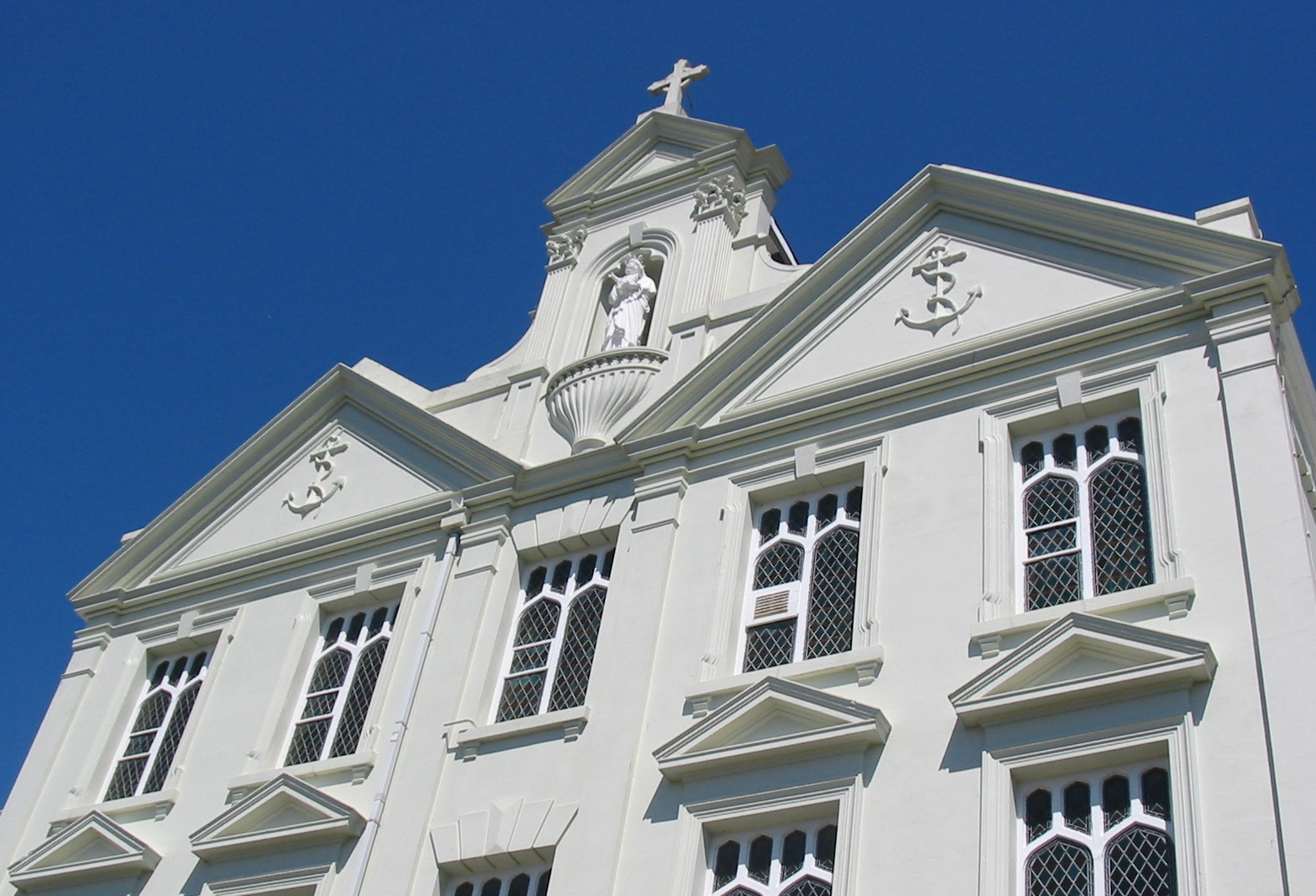
Anchors on the façade and a statue of the Madonna and Child show the college's past as a naval college and Catholic institution

The main feature of the college is its Great Hall. This is the former chapel built by the Jesuits and features a magnificent hammer beam room and stained glass windows. The college has hosted The Queen, the Prince of Wales, The UK Lord Chancellor and other distinguished guests in the Hall.

The sixth form college curriculum of Highlands College covers:

- Automotive Studies
- Art and Design
- Building Services
- Building Trades
- Business
- Childcare and Education
- Computing
- Culinary Skills and Restaurant Service
- Hair and Beauty
- Health and Social Care
- Mechanical Engineering and Welding Studies
- Media
- Performing Arts
- Sport
- Animal Management
- Digital Games Design
- Uniformed Services
- Hospitality and Tourism

The college also provides a Life Skills course (at Entry level) and a pathways course (at level 1) as well as an Access to Higher Education Course in Social Sciences and in Science. These 18 subject areas are offered at level 3 with the Jersey Progression Qualification offered at level 2 in 14 subject areas. There are specialist technical qualifications at level 2 in Catering, Motor Vehicle, Retail, Building Services and Building Trades linked to the Apprenticeship service.

University College Jersey provides degree and diploma courses in Civil Engineering, Human Resource Management and Construction (London South Bank University), Business and Management, Childhood Studies, Psychology and Criminology, Social Sciences (University of Plymouth) and Computing and Sport (Pearson Higher National Diploma).

Adult and Community Education is run at the main campus and at a specialist Adult Education Centre in Trinity offering a range of over 60 leisure and general interest courses. In addition the college has a Professional Studies Department offering a range of CMI and other professional courses for adults in work or considering a change in career which is housed in a specialist centre.

Since 2015, the college has established a rigorous self-assessment process that is externally validated by a group of educational and industry peers. The college is benchmarked alongside the 200 or so English General Further Education Colleges and, 2018, ranked itself as 31st for the 6th Form Provision and 1st for Apprenticeship provision.

== See also ==
- List of Jesuit sites
