= Listed buildings in Jersey =

There are a number of listed buildings in Jersey. These listed buildings, which includes structures such as pumps, range from castles to terraced houses.

The list is controlled by the States Assembly and is based on a system of historic environment protection.

Listings by Grade, 2022
	Buildings					Places				Combined			
	Grade 1	Grade 2	Grade 3	Grade 4	Total	Grade 1	Grade 2	Grade 3	Total	Grade 1	Grade 2	Grade 3	Total
Grouville	6	21	115	95	237	2	1	1	4	8	22	116	241
St Brélade	14	46	165	81	306	6	10	4	20	20	56	169	326
St Clement	5	14	59	45	123	3	5	0	8	8	19	59	131
St Helier	30	132	965	569	1696	7	13	8	28	37	145	973	1724
St John	5	14	102	63	184	3	1	0	4	8	15	102	188
St Lawrence	5	23	115	75	218	2	2	0	4	7	25	115	222
St Martin	13	23	132	104	272	2	3	1	6	15	25	133	278
St Mary	2	11	67	37	117	2	5	1	8	4	16	68	125
St Ouen	12	37	110	65	224	4	9	0	13	16	46	110	237
St Peter	7	17	123	92	239	3	2	2	9	10	19	125	248
St Saviour	3	19	183	97	302	2	2	2	6	5	21	185	308
Trinity	7	12	124	65	208	5	6	0	11	12	18	124	219
All Parishes:	109	369	2260	1388	4126	41	59	19	119	150	427	2279	4245

== Grouville ==
Name	Reference	Grade	Image	Street	Category	Summary
Fort William	GR0035	Grade 3		La Rue à Don	Castles and forts	Fortress built circa 1760, with WW2 alterations.
Grouville Parish Hall	GR0037	Grade 3		La Rue à Don	Law / government building	Mid-19th century parish school with a 20th-century extension.
Grouville Parish Church	GR0046	Grade 1		La Rue à Don	Church	12th-century Gothic church with 14th and mid-15th century chapels.
La Rocque Methodist Church	GR0064	Grade 3		La Grande Route des Sablons	Church	19th century Neo-Gothic Methodist church.
La Rocque Harbour	GR0079	Grade 1		La Grande Route des Sablons	Maritime structure	Harbour structure, circa 1826.
La Platte Rocque	GR0080	Grade 2		La Grande Route des Sablons	Residential building	Late Victorian house with 18th century Conway tower and WW2 defensive additions.
The Guard House & La Rocque Tower	GR0089	Grade 1		La Grande Route des Sablons	Coastal defence tower	Single-story guardhouse and magazine built in 1691 and a Conway tower (also known as Grouville Bay No.1) built 1779–1780. Site also includes the remains of an 18th-century battery and of Le Boulevard de la Rocque. Site has WW2 alterations.
Seymour Tower	GR0113	Grade 1		La Grande Route des Sablons	Coastal defence tower	Sole square Conway tower, circa 1780, with WW2 alterations.
Tower No.2 (Keppel Tower)	GR0117	Grade 3		La Grande Route des Sablons	Coastal defence tower	Conway tower, circa 1780. Presently incorporated into a 20th-century house
Tower No.3 (Hurel Tower)	GR0118	Grade 3		La Grande Route des Sablons	Coastal defence tower	Conway tower, circa 1780. Presently incorporated into a 20th-century house.
Tower No.4 (Fauvic Tower)	GR0119	Grade 3		La Grande Route des Sablons	Coastal defence tower	Conway tower, circa 1780. Presently incorporated into a 20th-century house.
Tower No.5 (La Tour du Nord)	GR0120	Grade 1		La Grande Route des Sablons	Coastal defence tower	Conway tower, circa 1780.
Le Moulin de Beauvoir	GR0137	Grade 2		La Rue du Moulin à Vent	Mills	One of the four surviving windmills in Jersey.
St Peter la Rocque	GR0143	Grade 4		La Rue du Pont	Church	Mid-19th century chapel of ease.
La Hougue Bie	GR0212	Grade 1		La Route de la Hougue Bie	Archaeological site	Neolithic passage grave with a 12th-century chapel and WWII structures.
Fort Henry	GR0244	Grade 1		La Rue de la Ville es Renauds	Castles and forts	18th century fort, formerly known as Fort Conway, with WW2 alterations.
Le Catillon	GR0261	Grade 1		Le Catillon	Archaeological site	Find spot for Celtic hoards.

== St Brélade ==
Name	Reference	Grade	Image	Road	Category	Summary
St Brélade Tower No.2	BR0037	Grade 3		Le Mont Sohier	Coastal defence tower	Conway tower, circa 1778.
Corbière Lighthouse	BR0047	Grade 1		La Rue de la Corbière	Lighthouse	Victorian lighthouse, 1874.
La Moye Quarry Magazine	BR0060	Grade 2		La Rue de la Corbière	Industrial building	19th century magazine associated with a stone quarry.
Noirmont Tower	BR0085	Grade 1		Le Chemin de Noirmont	Coastal defence tower	Martello tower, 1811.
La Rocco Tower	BR0089	Grade 1		St Ouens Bay	Coastal defence tower	Conway tower, circa 1800.
Ouaisné Tower (St Brélade No.1)	BR0090	Grade 1		Ouaisné Common	Coastal defence tower	Conway tower, late 18th century.
Portelet Tower (La Tour Janvrin)	BR0105	Grade 1		Portelet Bay	Coastal defence tower	Martello tower, 1808.
St Brélade Parish Church	BR0115	Grade 1		Le Mont ès Croix	Church	11th or early 12th century Gothic church, with 11th-century detached Fishermen's Chapel. Has additions from the 13th to 16th centuries.
St Brélade Church Hall (Balleine Hall)	BR0129	Grade 4		Le Mont ès Croix	Culture / entertainment building	20th-century church hall.
Les Lumières	BR0130	Grade 1		La Route Orange	Residential building	1930's Modernist house.
St Aubîn's Methodist Church	BR0160	Grade 3		Le Boulevard	Church	Mid-Victorian Neo-Gothic Methodist church built in the Early English style.
St Brélade Parish Hall	BR0178	Grade 4		La Neuve Route	Law / government building	Late 19th century railway terminus building.
Wesleyan School Hall	BR0179	Grade 3		Le Quai Bisson	Church	19th century school associated with Wesleyan Chapel (also known as St Aubîn's Methodist Church).
German Occupation Site: Strongpoint Corbière	BR0196	Grade 1		Corbière Point	Military structure	Part of an integrated network of defensive structures built by the Germans during their occupation of the island in WWII.
La Table des Marthes	BR0211	Grade 1		La Route de la Corbière	Archaeological site	Prehistoric monument.
German Occupation Site: Strongpoint Le Grouin	BR0221	Grade 1		Le Grouin Point	Military structure	Part of an integrated network of defensive structures built by the Germans during their occupation of the island in WWII.
Les Blanches Prehistoric Landscape	BR0228	Grade 1		Les Mielles	Archaeological site	Prehistoric landscape including funerary and ceremonial monuments.
German Occupation Site: Naval Coastal Artillery Battery 'Lothringen'	BR0247	Grade 1		Noirmont Point	Military structure	Part of an integrated network of defensive structures built by the Germans during their occupation of the island in WWII.
La Hougue de Vinde	BR0251	Grade 1		Le Chemin de Noirmont	Archaeological site	Circular tumulus of the cist-in-circle type, circa 2850–2250 BC.
La Cotte de St Brélade	BR0255	Grade 1		Headland South of Ouaisné Bay	Archaeological site	Neanderthal site.
German Occupation Site: Resistance Point La Carriere	BR0262	Grade 1		La Carriere Point	Military structure	Part of an integrated network of defensive structures built by the Germans during their occupation of the island in WWII.
La Sergenté	BR0266	Grade 1		L'Œillère Headland	Archaeological site	Prehistoric monument.
Beauport Dolmen (Dolmen de Fiquet)	BR0280	Grade 1		Field 574 Nr La Verte Rue	Archaeological site	Dolmen.
St Aubîn's Harbour	BR0282	Grade 1		La Neuve Route	Maritime structure	18th–19th century harbour.
Clarendon House	BR0295	Grade 3		La Rue du Crocquet	Residential building	Mid-19th century townhouse.
Church of St Aubîn on the Hill	BR0327	Grade 1		Le Mont les Vaux	Church	Late Victorian example of Gothic Revival in the Early English style.
Church of the Sacred Heart	BR0342	Grade 3		La Neuve Route	Church	Neo-Gothic church built in 13th-century style.
St Aubîn's Fort	BR0348	Grade 1		St Aubîn's Bay	Castles and forts	Tudor fort, built circa 1542, significantly modified in the 1730s and during WWII.

== St Clement ==
Name	Reference	Grade	Image	Road	Category	Summary
Samarès Methodist Church	CL0017	Grade 4		La Grande Route de la Cote	Church	1903 Methodist church.
La Bourdonnerie	CL0026	Grade 4		La Rue de la Lourderie	Residential building	19th century Edwardian rural house.
Caldwell Hall	CL0037	Grade 3		La Grande Route de St Clement	Law / government building	Late 19th century parish hall.
Nicolle Tower	CL0046	Grade 1		La Rue au Blancq	Miscellaneous structure	Belvedere in Neo-Gothic style, 1821; with 1943 German military additions.
Le Dolmen du Mont Ubé	CL0049	Grade 1		La Rue de la Blinerie	Archaeological site	Neolithic passage grave, circa 4000 BC.
La Dame Blanche	CL0053	Grade 1		La Rue de la Croix	Archaeological site	Prehistoric monument.
Le Hocq Tower	CL0060	Grade 1		La Rue du Hocq	Coastal defence tower	Conway tower, circa 1780.
Icho Tower & Islet	CL0061	Grade 1		St Clement's Bay	Coastal defence tower	Martello tower built in 1810 on a prehistoric habitation site.
St Clement's Parish Church	CL0072	Grade 1		La Grande Route de St Clement	Church	12th century Gothic church with 13th and 14th century additions.
Samarès Manor	CL0085	Grade 1		La Grande Route de St Clement	Residential building	Manor house begun in the 11th or 12th centuries and added to in the 18th or 19th.
La Motte	CL0089	Grade 1		Green Island	Archaeological site	
Lavoir	CL0113	Grade 2		La Rue de la Blinerie	Water supply feature	19th century washing-place.

== St Helier ==
Name	Reference	Grade	Image	Road	Category	Summary
1 Almorah Crescent	HE0001	Grade 1		Almorah Crescent	Residential building	Regency terrace.
2 Almorah Crescent	HE0002	Grade 1		Almorah Crescent	Residential building	Regency terrace.
3 Almorah Crescent	HE0003	Grade 1		Almorah Crescent	Residential building	Regency terrace.
4 Almorah Crescent	HE0004	Grade 1		Almorah Crescent	Residential building	Regency terrace.
5 Almorah Crescent	HE0009	Grade 1		Almorah Crescent	Residential building	Regency terrace.
Brew House	HE0010	Grade 3		Ann Street	Industrial building	Brew House, circa 1950.
Aquila Road Methodist Church	HE0015	Grade 3		Aquila Road	Church	Former Methodist church, built in 1839 and enlarged in 1866.
Odeon Cinema	HE0024	Grade 1		Bath Street	Culture / entertainment building	Cinema, 1952, by T. P. Bennett & Son.
6 Almorah Crescent	HE0094	Grade 1		Almorah Crescent	Residential building	Regency terrace.
United Club	HE0119	Grade 2		Church Street	Commercial building	19th century building with a distinguished frontage.
Parish Church of St Helier	HE0120	Grade 1		Church Street	Church	Gothic church, 11th and 12th century in origin with later alterations, enlargements, and restorations from the 13th–21st centuries.
27 Esplanade (East Warehouse)	HE0129	Grade 3		Esplanade	Industrial building	1890's merchant's store and warehouse with historical associations with Jersey's potato trade.
7 Almorah Crescent	HE0168	Grade 1		Almorah Crescent	Residential building	Regency terrace.
7 David Place	HE0183	Grade 2		David Place	Residential building	Substantial well-proportioned Georgian house.
7 Francis Street	HE0217	Grade 3		Francis Street	Residential building	Early 19th century house.
Jersey Opera House	HE0220	Grade 2		Gloucester Street	Culture / entertainment building	Opera house, circa 1900.
St Simon's Church	HE0224	Grade 2		Great Union Road	Church	19th century Neo-Gothic church in the Decorated style.
Havre des Pas Bathing Pool	HE0266	Grade 2		Havre des Pas	Commercial building	Sea water swimming pool originating from 1895.
8 Almorah Crescent	HE0268	Grade 1		Almorah Crescent	Residential building	Regency terrace.
10 (Royal Court Chambers)	HE0271	Grade 3		Hill Street	Law / government building	Victorian office building in Italianate style, 1870s-1880s.
16 Hill Street	HE0278	Grade 2		Hill Street	Residential building	Georgian town house built by Jean Perrochon in 1748. The building can be seen on the right of the photo.
35 King Street	HE0292	Grade 2		King Street	Retail building	Late Victorian (1896) corner shop.
5 Library Place	HE0315	Grade 1		Library Place	Law / government building	18th century example of a public library.
1-3 Library Place	HE0320	Grade 3		Library Place	Commercial building	Georgian, early to mid-19th century shop.
9 Almorah Crescent	HE0347	Grade 1		Almorah Crescent	Residential building	Regency terrace.
10 Almorah Crescent	HE0348	Grade 1		Almorah Crescent	Residential building	Regency terrace.
St Paul's Church	HE0356	Grade 3		New Street	Church	19th century Neo-Gothic church.
9 Pier Road	HE0396	Grade 1		Pier Road	Public building	Built in 1815, the entrance has a Roman Doric Neoclassical porch.
11 Royal Square	HE0443	Grade 4		Royal Square	Residential building	19th-century frontage.
13 Royal Square	HE0444	Grade 2		Royal Square	Commercial building	Late 17th-century building.
15 Royal Square	HE0445	Grade 2		Royal Square	Retail building	Early 18th-century building.
16 Royal Square	HE0446	Grade 2		Royal Square	Retail building	Early 18th-century building.
18 Royal Square (Cock & Bottle)	HE0447	Grade 3		Royal Square	Retail building	Early 19th-century building.
19 Royal Square	HE0448	Grade 3		Royal Square	Commercial building	Early 19th-century building.
Jersey Masonic Temple	HE0473	Grade 2		Stopford Road	Culture / entertainment building	Masonic Temple dating from 1864, in Classical style.
St Thomas' Church	HE0489	Grade 2		Val Plaisant	Church	19th century Neo-Gothic church, built in 13th-century French Gothic style.
Town Hall	HE0523	Grade 3		York Street	Law / government building	19th century Renaissance Revival building, in the French Renaissance style.
5 York Street	HE0529	Grade 3		York Street	Residential building	19th century townhouse and shop.
92 Bath Street	HE0531	Grade 3		Bath Street	Residential building	1830's house.
The Deanery	HE0575	Grade 3		David Place	Residential building	1842 house. Residence of the Dean of Jersey.
Fern Hill	HE0589	Grade 2		La Grande Route de Mont à l'Abbé	Residential building	Manor house, 16th-century with added late 17th-century, early 18th-century, and mid-19th-century buildings. Associated with the Fief ès Poingdestres.
1 King Street	HE0613	Grade 3		King Street	Retail building	Late Victorian corner building.
21 Regent Road (Lismore)	HE0643	Grade 3		Regent Road	Residential building	Early 19th century house, with 17th or 18th century origins.
Les Chalets	HE0645	Grade 2		Queen's Road	Residential building	A terrace of three Late Victorian granite houses.
2-6 Queen Street (Mappin & Webb)	HE0646	Grade 3		Queen Street	Retail building	Late Victorian shop in Italianate and Ruskinian Gothic style.
22 Regent Road (La Marotte)	HE0655	Grade 3		Regent Road	Residential building	Early 19th century house.
The Piquet House	HE0680	Grade 2		Royal Square	Law / government building	1803 military picket house.
17 Royal Square (The Peirson)	HE0681	Grade 2		Royal Square	Retail building	Early 18th-century building.
Le Chatelet	HE0727	Grade 2		Victoria Street	Residential building	Victorian-Gothic house.
Beaulieu Convent School	HE0732	Grade 2		Wellington Road	Education building	1820's, Neoclassical, villa-style building.
Le Dolmen du Pre des Lumières (Gasworks Dolmen)	HE0784	Grade 1		L'Avenue et Dolmen du Pre des Lumières	Archaeological site	Dolmen.
St Mark's Church	HE0949	Grade 3		David Place	Church	Victorian Neo-Gothic church, circa 1840.
General Hospital (1860)	HE1003	Grade 1		Gloucester Street	Public building	19th century general hospital.
Green Street Cemetery	HE1025	Grade 1		Green Street	Designed landscape	Early 19th century garden cemetery.
Central Market	HE1042	Grade 1		Halkett Place	Commercial building	Victorian covered market.
Halkett Place Evangelical Church & Church Hall	HE1043	Grade 2		Halkett Place	Church	Decorated Neo-Gothic church.
English Harbour & French Harbour	HE1081	Grade 1		Harbour	Maritime structure	Harbour built from the early 18th century to 1814.
Fort d'Auvergne	HE1102	Grade 4		Havre des Pas	Castles and forts	18th century fortress.
Liberty Wharf	HE1159	Grade 2		La Route de la Liberation	Industrial building	A complex of Victorian and Edwardian commercial and industrial buildings, including the old railway terminus.
St Columba's Church of Scotland	HE1174	Grade 2		Midvale Road	Church	Victorian Neo-Gothic church.
Fort Regent & South Hill Battery	HE1195	Grade 1		Le Mont de Ville	Castles and forts	Late Georgian fort with WW2 alterations.
Victoria College	HE1201	Grade 1		Le Mont Millais	Education building	Victorian, Neo-Gothic school, mid-19th century.
Cenotaph	HE1274	Grade 1		The Parade	Public monuments and memorials	Memorial to Jèrriais who died in World Wars 1 and 2, initially built in 1923.
All Saints' Church	HE1275	Grade 3		Savile Street	Church	19th century chapel of ease.
Almorah Cemetery	HE1319	Grade 1		La Pouquelaye	Designed landscape	Mid-19th century garden cemetery.
Jersey College for Girls	HE1389	Grade 2		Rouge Bouillon	Education building	Late Victorian Corinthian Neoclassical building.
States Building & Royal Court	HE1422	Grade 1		Royal Square	Law / government building	Built from 1866–1877.
Royal Square (Incl. Statue of King George II & VEGA Pavement)	HE1423	Grade 1		Royal Square	Designed landscape	Public square.
Elizabeth Castle & Hermitage	HE1426	Grade 1		La Baie de la Ville (St Aubîn's Bay)	Castles and forts	12th century abbey, with military additions from the Tudor period to WW2. Includes a chapel on the site of St Helier's hermitage and the remains of a 9th–10th century tri-absidal chapel (the oldest ecclesiastic remains in the Channel Islands).
Dolmen de Ville-es-Nouaux	HE1430	Grade 1		La Route de St Aubîn	Archaeological site	Site with dolmens.
St Aubîn No.1 (First Tower)	HE1431	Grade 3		La Route de St Aubîn	Coastal defence tower	Conway tower, circa 1780.
First Tower Methodist Church	HE1433	Grade 3		La Route de St Aubîn	Church	19th century Neoclassical Methodist church with some Neo-Gothic touches.
St Andrew's Church	HE1446	Grade 2		Le Mont Cochon	Church	20th-century church.
St James' Church & Vicarage	HE1459	Grade 3		St James' Street	Church	Early 19th century Neo-Gothic church with a late 19th-century vicarage of mixed Victorian Gothic and Arts and Crafts styles.
La Petite Pouclée	HE1562	Grade 1		Clos du Parcq	Archaeological site	Prehistoric monument.
1 Windsor Crescent	HE1614	Grade 1		Val Plaisant	Residential building	Regency symmetrical crescent terrace of houses.
Baptist Church	HE1627	Grade 3		Vauxhall Street	Church	Mid-19th century Corinthian Neoclassical church.
The New Church	HE1644	Grade 3		Victoria Street	Church	Mid-19th century Neo-Gothic church.
2 Windsor Crescent	HE1788	Grade 1		Val Plaisant	Residential building	Regency symmetrical crescent terrace of houses.
3 Windsor Crescent	HE1789	Grade 1		Val Plaisant	Residential building	Regency symmetrical crescent terrace of houses.
4 Windsor Crescent	HE1790	Grade 1		Val Plaisant	Residential building	Regency symmetrical crescent terrace of houses.
5 Windsor Crescent	HE1791	Grade 1		Val Plaisant	Residential building	Regency symmetrical crescent terrace of houses.
6 Windsor Crescent	HE1792	Grade 1		Val Plaisant	Residential building	Regency symmetrical crescent terrace of houses.
7 Windsor Crescent	HE1793	Grade 1		Val Plaisant	Residential building	Regency symmetrical crescent terrace of houses.
8 Windsor Crescent	HE1794	Grade 1		Val Plaisant	Residential building	Regency symmetrical crescent terrace of houses.
Les Côtils Farm Menhir	HE1843	Grade 1		La Rue des Côtils	Archaeological site	Prehistoric monument.
St Mary's & St Peter's Church	HE1906	Grade 3		Wellington Road	Church	1970's Brutalist church.

== St John ==
Name	Reference	Grade	Image	Street	Category	Summary
London House	JN0007	Grade 3		Le Chemin des Hougues	Farm group	Mid-19th century cottage.
Les Capelles Bakehouse / Bell Tower	JN0016	Grade 3		La Rue de la Mare Bellam	Farm group	Detached bakehouse.
Le Marinel	JN0018	Grade 1		Les Chenolles	Farm group	16th–19th century farmstead.
Bonne Nuit Harbour	JN0042	Grade 1		Les Charrières de Bonne Nuit	Maritime structure	19th century stone harbour.
St John Parish Hall	JN0047	Grade 2		La Rue de la Mare Ballam	Law / government building	Edwardian parish hall in Tudor Gothic Revival style.
Sion Methodist Church	JN0075	Grade 1		La Grande Route de St Jean	Church	1880 Methodist church built in the style of an Ionic temple.
United Reformed Church	JN0083	Grade 3		La Grande Route de St Jean	Church	19th century Neo-Gothic church.
Centre Stone	JN0092	Grade 1		La Rue des Servais	Archaeological site	
La Tête de Frémont Promontory Fort (Le Chate Earthwork)	JN0093	Grade 1		Frémont Point	Archaeological site	
La Hougue Boëte	JN0094	Grade 1		La Rue des Buttes	Archaeological site	Prehistoric monument.
St John's Parish Church	JN0134	Grade 1		La Route de St Jean	Church	12th century Gothic church, with additions and restorations in the 15th, 17th, 19th, and 20th centuries.
La Crête Fort	JN0138	Grade 1		Les Nouvelles Charrières	Castles and forts	1834 fort.
Frémont House	JN0152	Grade 3		La Rue de Frémont	Residential building	17th–18th century rural house.

== St Lawrence ==
Name	Reference	Grade	Image	Street	Category	Summary
St Lawrence Parish Hall	LA0018	Grade 2		La Grade Route de St Laurent	Law / government building	Late-19th century parish hall.
Six Rues Methodist Church	LA0071	Grade 3		La Rue	Church	Mid-Victorian Decorated Neo-Gothic Methodist church.
Hamptonne	LA0123	Grade 1		La Rue de la Patente	Farm group	Farm complex built from the 15th to 19th centuries.
St Matthew's Church	LA0154	Grade 1		La Route de St Aubîn	Church	Main structure is an 1840 chapel of ease; present state is a collaboration of the architect A B Grayson and the glass designer René Lalique.
Tesson Chapel	LA0158	Grade 4		La Vallée de St Pierre	Church	Mid-19th century Tudor Revival chapel.
La Pierre des Bessieres	LA0167	Grade 1		La Rue des Bessieres	Archaeological site	Prehistoric monument.
St Lawrence Parish Church	LA0197	Grade 1		La Grade Route de St Laurent	Church	12th century Gothic church, with many 13th-century additions and some from the 16th century. Built atop a Gallo-Roman site.
Seafield House	LA0227	Grade 1		La Route de St Aubîn	Residential building	Regency villa, built 1808–1809.
German Occupation Site: Casemate, Resistance Point Millbrook	LA0245	Grade 1		Victoria Avenue	Military structure	Part of an integrated network of defensive structures built by the Germans during their occupation of the island in WWII.
Le Rat Cottage	LA0252	Grade 2		Le Mont l'Evesque	Residential building	16th century or early 17th century house.
Coronation Park	LA0274	Grade 1		La Route de St Aubîn	Designed landscape	1930's seaside park.

== St Martin ==
Name	Reference	Grade	Image	Street	Category	Summary
Gouray Church	MN0040	Grade 3		La Grande Route de Faldouet	Church	Early 19th century Neo-Gothic church.
Victoria Tower	MN0063	Grade 1		Le Mont Mallet	Coastal defence tower	1837 Martello tower with WW2 alterations.
St Martin Methodist Church	MN0078	Grade 3		La Rue Belin	Church	Mid-19th century Neo-Gothic Methodist church.
Rozel Mill (Le Moulin de Rozel)	MN0082	Grade 1		La Rue du Moulin	Mills	Windmill tower of medieval origin (possibly as early as 14th century) with WW2 alterations.
St Martin's Parish Church	MN0086	Grade 1		La Rue de la Croix au Maitre	Church	12th century Gothic church with 14th and 15th century additions.
Wrentham Hall	MN0088	Grade 3		La Grande Route de Rozel	Residential building	1822 rural villa.
Rosel Manor	MN0149	Grade 1		La Grande Route de Rozel	Residential building	18th century manor house with early 19th-century remodelling. Site dates back to the Middle Ages and includes an 11th– to 12th-century manorial chapel dedicated to St Anne.
Archirondel Tower	MN0179	Grade 1		La Route de la Cote	Coastal defence tower	Conway tower, circa 1780, with WW2 modifications.
Mount Orgueil Castle	MN0181	Grade 1		La Route de la Cote	Castles and forts	1204 castle built atop an Iron Age promontory fort, with significant Tudor alterations and some additions from the 18th–20th centuries.
Watchtower	MN0184	Grade 1		La Coupe Point	Military structure	Early 19th century watchtower built during the Napoleonic Wars.
Fliquet Tower	MN0190	Grade 3		La Rue de Fliquet	Coastal defence tower	Conway tower, circa 1780, with WW2 modifications.
Le Dolmen du Couperon & Guardhouse	MN0197	Grade 1		La Rue des Fontenelles	Archaeological site	Prehistoric monument and a military guardhouse.
Gun Battery	MN0200	Grade 1		La Coupe Point	Military structure	Late 18th to early 19th century open gun battery.
Church of Our Lady & the Martyrs of Japan	MN0217	Grade 3		La Grande Route de St Martin	Church	Oldest-surviving purpose-built Catholic church in Jersey. 1863, in Neo-Gothic 13th century style.
St Catherine's Tower	MN0221	Grade 1		La Route de St Catherine	Coastal defence tower	Conway tower, circa 1780.
Le Pouquelaye de Faldouet	MN0224	Grade 1		La Rue des Marettes	Archaeological site	Prehistoric monument.
St Catherine's Breakwater (Northern Arm of Admiralty Harbour)	MN0265	Grade 1		Verclut Point	Maritime structure	19th century defensive breakwater.
Archirondel Breakwater (Southern Arm of Admiralty Harbour)	MN0296	Grade 1		St Catherine's Bay	Maritime structure	19th century defensive breakwater, incomplete.
Gorey Harbour	MN0297	Grade 1		Gorey Pier	Maritime structure	19th century stone pier.
Rozel Harbour	TR0160	Grade 1		La Brecque du Sud	Maritime structure	Harbour.

== St Mary ==
Name	Reference	Grade	Image	Street	Category	Summary
Grève de Lecq Barrcks	MY0036	Grade 1		Le Mont de St Marie	Military structure	Barracks, 1810–1815.
Bethlehem Methodist Church	MY0062	Grade 3		La Rue des Buttes	Church	19th century Methodist church.
L'Île Agois	MY0071	Grade 1		Le Col de la Rocque	Archaeological site	
La Tombette	MY0073	Grade 3		La Rue d'Olive	Farm group	House of early, possibly Pre-Reformation, origins.
Le Câtel de Lecq	MY0083	Grade 1		Le Grève de Lecq	Archaeological site	Defensive prehistoric earthwork with an 18th-century fort.
St Mary Parish Hall	MY0103	Grade 3		La Rue du Pont	Law / government building	19th century parish hall.
Les Colombiers Manor (Colombier)	MY0110	Grade 2		La Rue du Rondin	Outbuildings	Dovecote, dating back to at least the 15th century.
St Mary's Parish Church	MY0125	Grade 1		La Route de Ste Marie	Church	12th century Gothic church with a 14th-century spire and 16th-century chapel.
Gigoulande Mill	MY0154	Grade 2		La Dimerie	Mills	The only twin-wheeled watermill in Jersey with associated buildings; site has a recorded milling history reaching back to the 12th century.

== St Ouen ==
Name	Reference	Grade	Image	Street	Category	Summary
St George's Church	OU0018	Grade 3		La Rue des Cosnets	Church	Late 19th to early 20th century Neo-Gothic church.
St Ouen's Parish Church	OU0019	Grade 1		La Ville de l'église	Church	12th century Gothic church, with 13th and 14th century chapels, as well as 16th century aisles.
Grosnez Castle	OU0020	Grade 1		La Route de Grosnez	Castles and forts	Ruins of a 14th-century castle.
Le Dolmen de Géonnais	OU0034	Grade 1		La Rue des Géonnais	Archaeological site	Prehistoric monument.
Dolmen des Monts Grantez	OU0035	Grade 1		Le Chemin des Monts	Archaeological site	Prehistoric monument.
Medieval Strip Fields	OU0046	Grade 1		La Rue de la Compagne	Archaeological site	Surviving medieval strip of unenclosed fields with evidence of prehistoric activity.
Grève de Lecq Tower	OU0060	Grade 1		Le Mont de la Grève de Lecq	Coastal defence tower	Conway tower, circa 1778, with WW2 alterations.
Kempt Tower	OU0085	Grade 1		La Grande Route des Mielles	Coastal defence tower	Martello tower, circa 1834, with WW2 alterations.
Lewis' Tower	OU0092	Grade 1		La Grande Route des Mielles	Coastal defence tower	1835 Martello tower with minor WW2 alterations.
Le Moulin de Lecq	OU0093	Grade 2		Le Mont St Marie	Industrial building	Surviving watermill.
St Ouen's Mill (Moulin de la Compagne)	OU0130	Grade 1		La Rue de la Compagne	Mills	Windmill tower, circa 1830.
St Ouen's Manor	OU0132	Grade 1		La Grande Route de St Ouen	Residential building	Manor house with a 15th-century core and 17th- and 19th-century alterations. Held by the de Carteret family since the Middle Ages.
St Ouen's Methodist Church	OU0147	Grade 2		La Route de Trodez	Church	19th century Methodist church.
La Tour Cârée	OU0159	Grade 1		La Grande Route des Mielles	Military structure	18th century blockhouse.
Plémont Fortified Guardhouse	OU0163	Grade 2		Plémont Point	Military structure	Fortified guardhouse, circa 1810.
St Ouen Parish Hall	OU0164	Grade 2		La Grande Route de St Ouen	Law / government building	19th century parish hall.
Les Landes Prehistoric Landscape	OU0175	Grade 1		La Route des Landes	Archaeological site	Includes Palaeolithic, Mesolithic, and Neolithic archæological sites.
German Occupation Site: MG Turret, R.N. La Mare Mill	OU0176	Grade 1		Le Mont Rossignol	Military structure	Part of an integrated network of defensive structures built by the Germans during their occupation of the island in WWII.
La Ronce	OU0196	Grade 3		La Route de Trodez	Residential building	17th century small rural holding.

== St Peter ==
Name	Reference	Grade	Image	Street	Category	Summary
Le Moulin de Quétivel	PE0045	Grade 2		Le Mount Fallu	Industrial building	18th century watermill; the last working watermill in Jersey.
Bethesda Methodist Church	PE0049	Grade 4		La Route du Moulin	Church	Mid-late 19th century Neo-Gothic Methodist church.
The Windmill	PE0071	Grade 3		Les Chenolles	Mills	Early 19th century windmill tower.
La Hague Manor (St George's School)	PE0079	Grade 2		La Rue de la Hague	Residential building	1753 manor house, remodelled in the 1870s.
Gargate Mill	PE0097	Grade 3		La Vallée de St Pierre	Mills	Watermill.
St Peter's Parish Cannon	PE0117	Grade 1		Beaumont Hill	Military structure	A 6 Owen cannon.
German Occupation Site: Command Bunker for Infantry Commander	PE0135	Grade 1		La Rue du Coin Varin	Military structure	Part of an integrated network of defensive structures built by the Germans during their occupation of the island in WWII.
German Occupation Site: Communications Bunker for Fortress Commander	PE0136	Grade 1		La Rue du Petit Aleval	Military structure	Part of an integrated network of defensive structures built by the Germans during their occupation of the island in WWII.
St Peter's Parish Hall	PE0151	Grade 3		La Rue des Fosses	Law / government building	Parish hall.
Philadelphie Methodist Church & Cemetery	PE0159	Grade 3		La Grande Route de St Pierre	Church	Early 19th century Neo-Gothic Methodist church with mid-19th-century cemetery.
La Caumine à Marie Best	PE0165	Grade 2		La Grande Route des Mielles	Military structure	Military guardhouse and magazine with mid-18th-century origins.
Les Trois Rocques	PE0167	Grade 1		La Grande Route des Mielles	Archaeological site	Prehistoric monument.
The White Menhir	PE0168	Grade 1		La Grande Route des Mielles	Archaeological site	Prehistoric monument.
St Aubîn No.3 (Beaumont Tower)	PE0177	Grade 1		La Route de la Haule	Coastal defence tower	Conway tower, circa 1780.
St Peter's Parish Church	PE0186	Grade 1		La Rue de l'Église	Church	11th–early 12th century Gothic church with 13th and 16th century additions.
German Occupation Site: Command and Communications Bunkers for Artillery Commander	PE0198	Grade 1		Le Mont de St Anastase	Military structure	Part of an integrated network of defensive structures built by the Germans during their occupation of the island in WWII.
Tesson Mill	PE0205	Grade 2		La Rue du Moulin de Tesson	Mills	19th century watermill, restored in the 21st century.
German Occupation Site: Command Bunker for Fortress Commander	PE0210	Grade 1		La Rue du Petit Aleval	Military structure	Part of an integrated network of defensive structures built by the Germans during their occupation of the island in WWII.
St Matthew's Church	PE0249	Grade 3		La Rue de la Ville au Bas	Church	1872 Neo-Gothic church in High Gothic style.
Cherry Farm Menhir	PE0258	Grade 1		La Rue de la Commune	Archaeological site	Prehistoric monument.

== St Saviour ==
Name	Reference	Grade	Image	Street	Category	Summary
St Luke's Church	SA0037	Grade 3		La Route du Fort	Church	Mid-19th century Neo-Gothic church.
Georgetown Methodist Church	SA0047	Grade 3		Georgetown Road	Church	Methodist church built in the mid-to-late 19th century.
St Saviour's Hospital	SA0050	Grade 1		La Route de la Hougue Bie	Health / welfare building	Victorian hospital and asylum.
St Michael's School	SA0052	Grade 4		La Rue de la Houguette	Education building	Mid-19th century house.
St Saviour's Parish Hall	SA0079	Grade 2		St Saviour's Hill	Law / government building	Late 19th century Neo-Gothic parish hall.
Government House	SA0095	Grade 2		St Saviour's Hill	Law / government building	Early 19th century villa. Has long been used as the lieutenant governor's residence.
Howard Davis Park	SA0166	Grade 1		St Clement's Road	Designed landscape	Extensive garden of a 19th-century villa with 20th-century additions.
Paul Mill	SA0214	Grade 3		Le Mont de la Rosiere	Mills	Watermill.
Jersey College for Girls (College House)	SA0215	Grade 3		Le Mont Millais	Education building	1901 Arts and Crafts style building.
Eden Methodist Church	SA0220	Grade 3		La Rue des Friquettes	Church	19th century Neo-Gothic Methodist church.
Le Ponterrin	SA0223	Grade 1		La Rue du Ponterrin	Residential building	16th century house and gatehouse.
St Saviour's Parish Church	SA0236	Grade 1		St Saviour's Hill	Church	12th-century Gothic church with a 13th-century chapel and numerous 15th-century alterations.
De la Salle College	SA0274	Grade 3		Wellington Road	Education building	Late 19th century Victorian building.
Les Varines	SA0318	Grade 1		North of Ivystill Lane	Archaeological site	Site of Upper Palaeolithic occupation.

== Trinity ==
Name	Reference	Grade	Image	Street	Category	Summary
Les Augrès Manor	TR0066	Grade 2		La Profonde Rue	Residential building	Manor house of medieval origin with an overall Georgian appearance.
Trinity School	TR0075	Grade 3		La Route de la Trinité	Education building	Victorian Neo-Gothic parish school.
Diélament Manor	TR0079	Grade 3		La Rue de Diélament	Residential building	Manor house site of medieval origin; present structure is mostly 18th century.
Belle Hougue Caves	TR0086	Grade 1		East Side of Belle Hougue Point	Archaeological site	Prehistoric monument.
Le Catel de Rozel Promontory Fort (La Petite Cæsarée)	TR0113	Grade 1		La Rue du Catel	Archaeological site	Earthwork of an Iron Age promontory fort.
Bouley Bay Pier	TR0116	Grade 1		Les Charrières de Boulay	Maritime structures	19th century stone harbour.
Fort Leicester	TR0117	Grade 1		Les Charrières de Boulay	Castles and forts	1836 fortress.
Rozel Fort	TR0125	Grade 2		La Rue du Catel	Castles and forts	Coastal fort, built in the mid-1830s, with WW2 alterations.
Diélament Manor (South Gateway)	TR0142	Grade 2		La Rue de Diélament	Roadside feature	17th century triple stone gateway.
La Hougue des Platons	TR0145	Grade 1		La Rue d'Égypte	Archaeological site	Cist-in-circle, Chalcolithic, circa 2250 BC.
Diélament Manor Colombier	TR0151	Grade 1		La Rue de Diélament	Outbuildings	16th century dovecote.
AA Call Box	TR0170	Grade 1		La Rue ès Picots	Transport structure	Surviving AA call box.
Parish Church of Trinity	TR0175	Grade 1		La Rue du Presbytere	Church	12th century Gothic church with 14th and mid-15th century additions and a partial rebuilding in 1865.
La Pierre de la Fetelle (La Roche à la Fée)	TR0176	Grade 1		La Rue des Platons	Archaeological site	Prehistoric monument.
L’Etacquerel Fort	TR0183	Grade 1		La Route des Côtes du Nord	Castles and forts	1836 fortress.
Trinity Manor	TR0198	Grade 1		La Route de la Trinité	Residential building	Manor house dating from circa 1600 to the 19th century.
Le Câtel de Rozel Promontory Fort 2	TR0217	Grade 2		La Rue du Catel	Archaeological site	Promontory fort.
Rockmount de Moustiers Gardens	TR0235	Grade 1		Jardin d'Olivet	Designed landscape	Mid-19th century gardens with Neo-Gothic pavilions.
