= Folly tower =

Ornamental structure

A folly tower is a tower that has been built as an architectural folly, that is, constructed for ornamental rather than practical reasons. Folly towers are common in Great Britain and Ireland, and often do have some practical value as landmarks, or as viewpoints, unlike other types of folly.

== List of folly towers ==
Folly towers
Name	Location	County	Year built	Notes
Beckford's Tower	Bath	Somerset	1827	built by owner as a library and retreat
Bettison's Folly	Hornsea	East Riding of Yorkshire	19th century	
Boot's Folly	Strines Reservoir	South Yorkshire	1927	built as a job creation scheme
Brizlee Tower	Alnwick	Northumberland	1781	
Broadway Tower	Broadway	Worcestershire	1794	
Brown's Folly	Bathford	Somerset	1848	
Castleboy Tower	Castleboy	Co. Galway	c.1800-1840	Formerly part of Castleboy country house
Charborough Tower	Charborough Park	Dorset	1790	
Clavell Tower	Isle of Purbeck	Dorset	1830	used as an observatory
Conygar Tower	Dunster	Somerset	1775	
Cranmore Tower	Cranmore	Somerset	1860s	
Culloden Tower	Richmond	North Yorkshire	1746	built to commemorate Cumberland's victory in the Battle of Culloden
Faringdon Folly	Faringdon	Oxfordshire	1935	
Flounder's Folly	Craven Arms	Shropshire	1838	
Fox Tower, Brough	Brough	Cumbria	1775	
Freston Tower	Freston	Suffolk	c. 15th–17th century	
Gothic Boathouse	Gunnersbury Park	London	c. 1835	
Hadlow Tower	Hadlow	Kent	1838	
Hartcliff Folly	Penistone	South Yorkshire	1856	
King Alfred's Tower	Brewham	Somerset	1760s	built to commemorate the end of the Seven Years' War and accession of George III
Kingfisher Tower	Otsego Lake	New York	1876	built as a job creation scheme
Luttrell's Tower	Calshot	Hampshire	c. 1780	possibly built as a landmark for smugglers
Nicolle Tower	Mont Ubé	Jersey	1821	
Paxton's Tower	Llanarthney	Carmarthenshire	1800s	
Penny Tower	Galway	County Galway	1822	built as a relief work during the Irish Famine, for which workers were paid a penny a day
Perrot's Folly	Edgbaston	West Midlands	1758	
Folly Tower, Pontypool	Pontypool	Torfaen	1760s	built as an observatory
Siddons Tower	near Cork Harbour	County Cork, Ireland	c. 1777	named for actress Sarah Siddons
Stratton's Tower	Little Berkhamsted	Hertfordshire	1789	served as a weather station
Uig Tower	Uig	Skye	1860	
Volta Tower	Finedon	Northants	1865	
Wainhouse Tower	Halifax	West Yorkshire	1875	served as a factory chimney
Watkin's Tower	Wembley	London	1895	not completed
Wilder's Folly	Sulham	Berks	1789	built as a belvedere, also served as a dovecote
