= Castleboy =

Castleboy may refer to:

- Castleboy Tower, a folly in County Galway, Ireland
- Castleboy Preceptory, of the Knights Hospitaller, in County Down, Northern Ireland; see List of monastic houses in County Down
- Castleboy (civil parish), parish and townland in County Down, Northern Ireland
- A townland in County Galway, Ireland; List of townlands of County Galway
- Two townlands in County Meath, Ireland; see List of townlands of County Meath
