= Grosnez Castle =

Ruined 14th-century castle in Jersey

- Saint Ouen, Jersey
- Grosnez Castle

Site information
- Type: Castle
- Owner: Privately owned by Rosel Estates Limited, managed by Jersey Heritage since 2003
- Open to the public: Yes
- Condition: Grade I Listed Ruined building

Location
- Coordinates: 49°15′27″N 02°14′47″W

Site history
- Built: 1369-73
- Built by: Sir Renaud de Carteret, Seigneur of St Ouen 1352-82
- In use: Unfinished upon capture
- Materials: Granite
- Battles/wars: Captured and destroyed by French in 1373, One Hundred Years War

Grosnez Castle is a ruined 14th-century castle in Saint Ouen, situated on the Grosnez headland in the north-west corner of the island of Jersey in the Channel Islands. None of the castle's history was known before the late nineteenth century when archaeological excavations were carried out to remove large quantities of rubble which covered all of the present ruins other than the top of the gatehouse.

There are extremely few documentary records relating to the castle and as a result, following the archaeological excavations, various theories were put forward by archaeologists and historians as to the castle's origins and history. Many have been repeated so often in the last ninety years that they have been regarded as the authoritative truth rather than possible theories as originally made. A review and further research of the archaeology and history of the castle have recently been published which puts forward a different and alternative plausible history.

That recent research suggests that the castle had an extremely short life immediately before it was captured by the Duc de Bourbon, who had opportunistically invaded the Channel Islands with Bertrand du Guesclin, Marshall of France, in 1373 hoping to capture rich booty and extract tributes and ransoms from islanders.

The research suggests that construction of the castle was started by Sir Renaud de Carteret, Seigneur of St. Ouen in about 1369–70 at the time warfare was renewed in the Hundred Years' War following the Treaty of Brétigny of 1360, and it was probably not even complete at the time of its capture three or four years later.

Following the common practice of warfare at the time, as there was no intention of occupying it longer term, the Grosnez Castle was sufficiently destroyed by Bourbon and du Guesclin to prevent its reoccupation and use by the inhabitants of Jersey, who would have been required to pay ransoms and tributes to the invaders in future years as agreed, and which the invaders would have little hesitation in brutally enforcing. In the case of De Guesclin and Bourbon, the island paid tributes until the end of 1375.

== Present state ==
Grosnez Castle is privately owned, has been managed by Jersey Heritage since 2003 and is open to the public. It is a Grade 1 listed building. There is a small, automated lighthouse at the rear of the castle at the top of the surrounding cliffs that affords scenic views out into the Atlantic Ocean, and towards the other Channel Islands and the coast of Normandy, France.

The castle ruins still present comprise a gatehouse, exterior walls and four towers and some simple interior buildings, all of local granite. The exterior walls are thickest on the landward side and the castle's position on a clifftop 200 ft (~ 60 m) above the sea which means that the natural features of the site protect it on three sides. Most of the remains are merely the footings and bases of walls exposed during the nineteenth century archaeological excavations and represent all that was left after centuries of stone salvage or pilfering.

The most substantial part of the castle remaining is the gatehouse, which would have been accessed via a drawbridge over a ditch excavated in the bedrock to the south. The gatehouse also had a portcullis and doors to both south and north sides and is of a design similar to that of the second gate at Gorey Castle on the east coast of Jersey, which dates to the late 13th century. There appears to be no evidence of any water well or cisterns within the castle or sally ports through its walls, which has led to the conclusion that use of the castle was one of refuge in times of invasion rather than a castle designed to withstand a longer siege.

The remains of the gatehouse and walls were extensively rebuilt / restored / consolidated after the archaeological excavations to make them safe. Visually, much of the gatehouse other than the archway was completely rebuilt. A stone stairway was also built in 1908 from the ditch to a small entrance to the side of the gatehouse to provide visitor access.

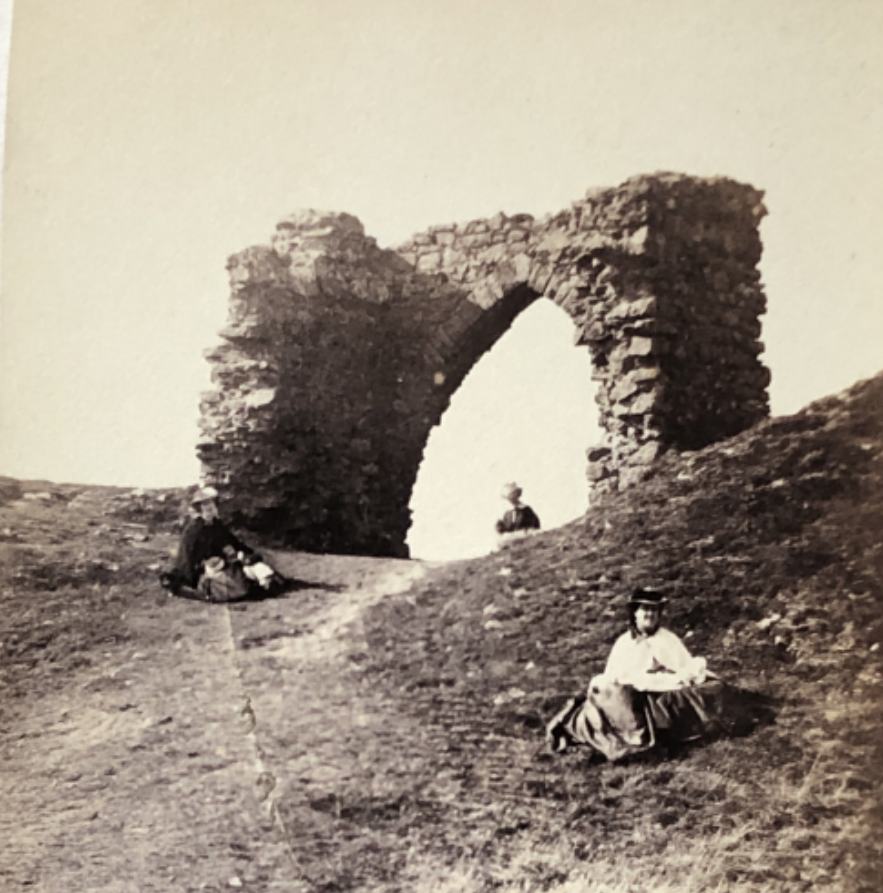
View of Grosnez Castle from outside looking towards the southwest in the 1880s before the excavations

== Name ==
The name comes from the old Norse words for "grey headland or cape" - grar nes - an accurate description of the site when seen from the sea. In time the spelling evolved to resemble the French for big nose. A nearby headland to the west, with Norse origins has a similar name, Rouge Nez.

== Archaeology ==
The archaeology of the Castle is one of the principal sources of information from which attempts to construct its history have been derived.

Two excavations were conducted by the Société Jersiaise in the 1880s and 1890s. The main discoveries made pertinent to solving the mystery of the Castle's origin and fate can be summarised:

- Most of the stone in the construction was quarried locally other than some Mont Mado quarry dressed granite corbels which would have come from the top of the gatehouse which were found at the base of the southern ditch.
- The Castle's construction was more substantial towards the south and west. It had little internal construction, and no wells or cisterns.
- The gatehouse had a drawbridge, portcullis, doors to the exterior, and further doors to the interior. An upper floor and wall parapet were accessed by an exterior stairway.
- There was evidence of considerable stone robbing from the upper layers of rubble.
- A layer of wind-blown soil was found in the western tower below a collapsed vault.
- Ten round pebbles were found in the southwestern tower together with a stack of others near the small entrance adjacent to the Gatehouse.
- A pile and layer of pure lime, was found on the floor of one of central buildings. A block of pure lime was found amongst the rubble removed during the excavations.
- Otherwise, there were surprisingly few artefacts found.

Based on these discoveries, the conclusions reached in 1897 were:

1. Grosnez was a castle of refuge for the western parishes of Jersey.
2. As it was not mentioned in the 1331 Extente, it probably owed its origins to the 1330s when Edward III ordered that the Islands’ defences be put in order.
3. It was built within a single period, and a seigneur of St Ouen was responsible as it appeared to be on his land.
4. The pebbles found were presumed to be projectiles for use in defence.
5. It was demolished deliberately based on the location where the dressed granite corbels were found.
6. Based upon the windblown soil found, it had been demolished before the end of the 14th century, although it was doubted whether Bertrand du Guesclin would have left it standing having laid siege to Gorey Castle in 1373.
7. For those reasons, Sir Philippe de Carteret, a later seigneur of St Ouen could not have held out there during the French occupation of Jersey in the 1460s.

Those archaeological conclusions were reviewed some thirty years later by Norman Rybot and Edmund Nicolle. They added to the proposition that the castle's origin dated to Edward III's orders in the 1330s by linking Sir Jean de Roches, who was Warden of the Channel Islands appointed the King. They also did not rule out the survival of the castle until the French occupation of Jersey in the 1460s.

== Documentary references to the Castle ==
There are few old documentary references to the castle. Those which have been found include:

- La Chronique du bon Duc Loys de Bourbon, written in 1429 by Jehan Cabaret d'Orville at the dictation of Noble Homme Jehan de Chateaubriand, at one time standard bearer of the Duke, refers to the Duke having attacked a castle and quickly captured it following the invasion of Jersey by him and Bertrand du Guesclin in 1373. As Du Guesclin is recorded as having laid siege to Gorey Castle on the other side of the island, the other castle is assumed to be Grosnez.
- A reference to Sir Philippe de Carteret, seigneur of St Ouen between c.1452 and 1500, who was given permission in 1483 to crenelate his manor house, presumably using stone from the ruined Grosnez Castle (see below - Later history)
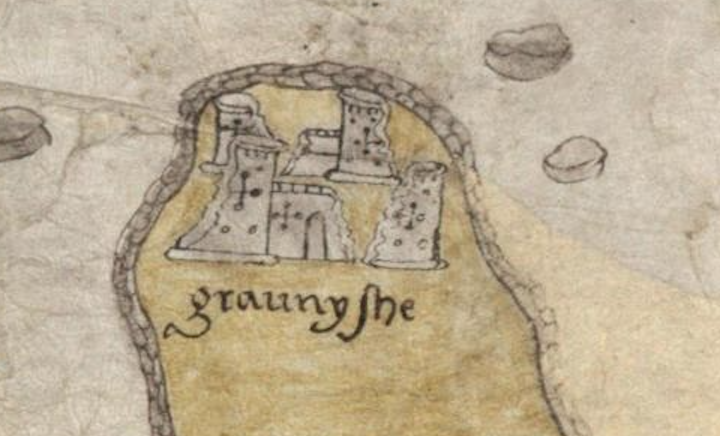
  Popinjay's Platte (1563) showing the only medieval image of Grosnez Castle
- Lealand's map of the Channel Islands (c.1540) shows a castle symbol and the words "Castrum Grosnes dirutum" (the ruined castle of Grosnes)
- Popinjay's Platte (1563), the image of the castle is depicted in ruins with the word "Grounyshe".
- Norden's Map (1585) shows a castle symbol and "Gronesse Cas."
- Each of Mercator's map (1606) and Speed's map (1610) show a castle symbol and "Gronesse Castle"
- An account of a Royal Commission sitting in Jersey in 1607 to investigate and determine the case brought by His Majesty's Attorney General against Sir Philip de Carteret, Seigneur of St. Ouen, "for keeping his court upon the Castle of Grosnes" to which the Crown claimed title by virtue of being on Crown land. The castle was referred to as being "but a heape of rubbyish and stones" on the Seigneur's fief and he called evidence in the form of witnesses to attest that he and his predecessors had been in possession of the castle from time immemorial. The case was inconclusive in terms of determining ownership, but the Seigneur was left in possession of the ruins.
- Cornelli's map (1695) shows a castle symbol and "Gronese Castel".

== Who built the Castle, when and why? ==
The lack of documentary references to the castle has been the principal reason why historians have struggled to discover its history. It is therefore somewhat a detective story of trying to piece together a history that is plausible and fits in with the few known facts, the archaeology and other facts known about the period in question.

One thing is clear is that no evidence has ever been discovered referring or indicating that Grosnez Castle was a "king's" castle (belonging to a king) or that a king made any contribution to its construction. The historic suggestion (for examples see) that it was built on the orders of Edward III is non-sensical without a specific reference being found in Royal records which are very plentiful from this period, and Sir Jean de Roches would have had no jurisdiction over anything other than the King's castles of Gorey Castle in Jersey and Castle Cornet in Guernsey. Indeed, there are plenty of references in the 1330s to works being carried out, and monies and materials being supplied on behalf of the Crown for these castles.

If Grosnez Castle was not a "king's" castle, and it was built by a seigneur of St. Ouen on whose land it then sat, then it is impossible to conceive that it was built in the 1330s just as the Hundred Years' War was starting. Jersey was attacked by the Scots in 1336 and by the French in 1338 and 1339, and on the latter occasions, the island suffered severe devastation at the hands of the invaders who were unchecked for two years although they never managed to capture the besieged Gorey Castle. Even Sir Renaud de Carteret (seigneur of St. Ouen from 1328 to 1349) was serving as part of his feudal obligations to defend Gorey Castle whilst under siege between 1338 and 1339.

Once the siege of Gorey Castle was lifted and French evicted from Jersey, Sir Renaud returned to his lands on the other side of the island to find his manor house completely destroyed by the French invaders. Any attempt to revert to normal life was, however, cut short following a disagreement with the Warden of the Channel Islands, when Sir Renaud and his son were banished from Jersey to Normandy from 1342 until his death in 1349. If that is insufficient to rule out this Sir Renaud, the archaeological evidence (the lack of artefacts found suggesting that the castle had a short life) is not consistent with a castle that, if built in the 1330s, should have revealed many finds evidencing a life of at least 35 to 40 years.

Sir Renaud was succeeded by his son, Sir Philippe (who had to seek a royal pardon to return to Jersey) during the period when the Black Death was rife, and he lived only three years as seigneur. Sir Philippe could not have built the castle. His brother, another Sir Renaud succeeded him in 1352. What we know about him is that he led a mission from Jersey in 1356 to eject the French from Castle Cornet in Guernsey which the latter had captured. Despite having succeeded in that mission, Sir Renaud became embroiled in a charge against him that he was responsible for the wrongful killing of a Guernsey man alleged to have been a traitor, was tried and imprisoned in Guernsey before receiving a Royal pardon.

In 1360, the first stage of the Hundred Years War ended with the Treaty of Brétigny which brought peace to Jersey and potentially provided time and the opportunity to build Grosnez Castle. However, military construction is not normally undertaken in times of peace where the threat of attack appears remote. That threat materialised when war with France broke out again in 1369 and the Crown quickly began making repairs and improvements to Gorey Castle. At that point, it would only be natural for Sir Renaud de Carteret, in the knowledge that his grandfather's manor had been destroyed by rampaging French just over thirty years before, to have considered the need to protect "his people", that is to say tenants and others from whom he derived his power and wealth, by building a castle of refuge on his lands in the absence of any other protection that those people could seek. There was also the element of personal prestige as one of the King's senior nobles in Jersey to have his own castle

Calculations have been done which have estimated that Grosnez castle might have taken as little as two to three years to build which would have given time to build it before it was attacked in 1373, and even if it was finished, it would only just have been which is consistent with the lack of artefacts found during the archaeological excavations.

What probably clinches the theory of such a late build in the period just before it was attacked, are two finds made during those 19th century archaeological excavations which were surprisingly ignored by the later reviews by Nicolle and Rybot. Those are the finds of (1) the pile and layer of pure lime on the floor of one of the small buildings inside the castle walls and (2) the solid piece of lime "perfectly white as though it had just come from the kiln" amongst the rubble removed from around the walls. There can only be one reason why lime of this nature was on site and that is it would have been used for making lime mortar. In other words, at the time the castle was captured and then destroyed, its construction was not yet complete and based on its position and size, would have met one of the main criteria for a medieval castle, that of projecting power from all those seeing it at a distance, whether from the sea or land.

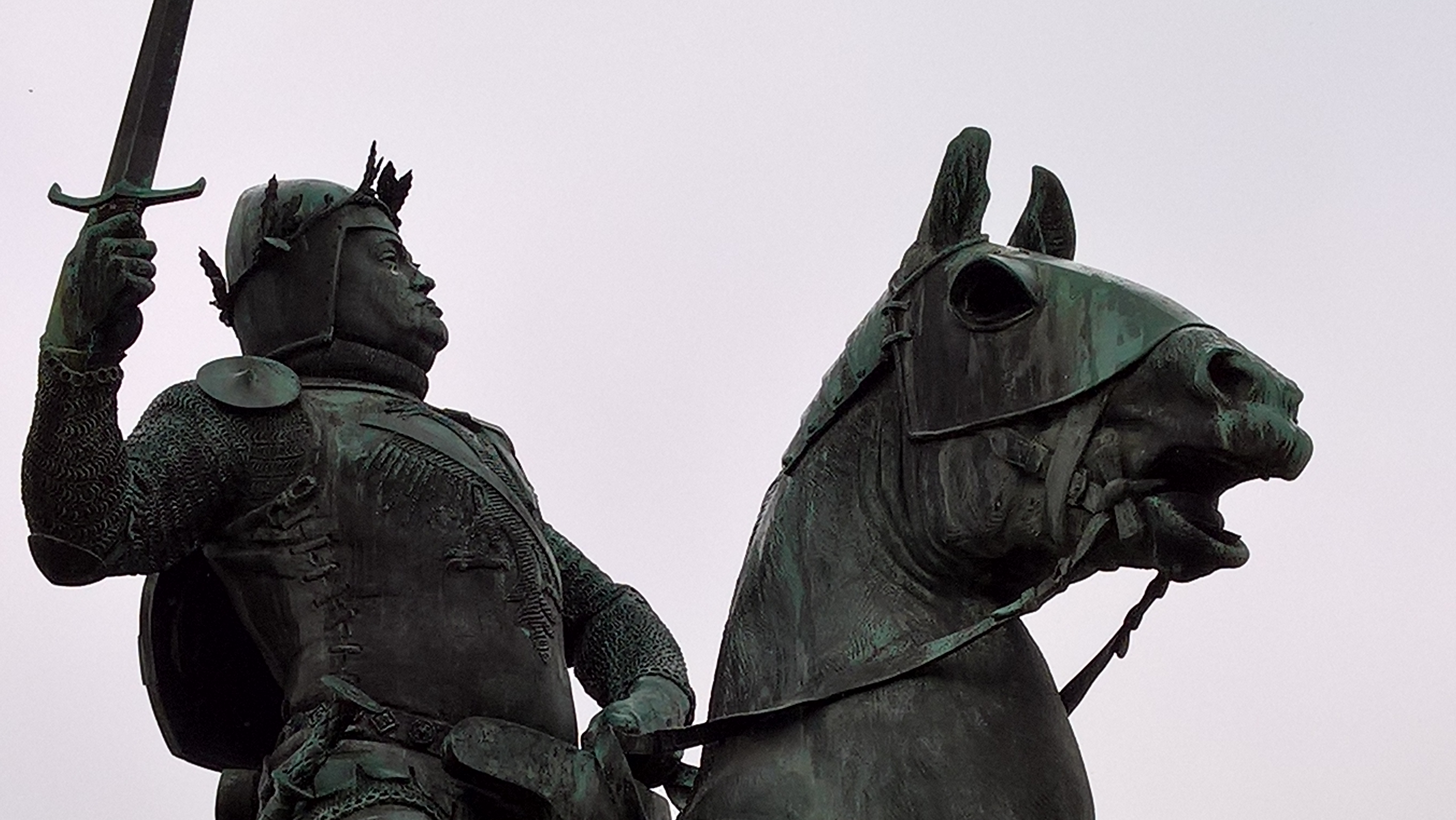
Bertrand du Guesclin, statue in Dinan, Brittany

The relatively speedy capture of the castle by Bourbon, whilst Bertrand du Guesclin was advancing upon Gorey Castle to lay siege, which is mentioned in La Chronique du bon Duc Loys de Bourbon would have been consistent with an uncompleted castle, hardly prepared for an attack. It is unlikely in such a scenario that many men would have been present to defend the castle and the round stones believed to have been projectiles found during the excavations, and still in situ within the castle walls, suggest that they were not used in the short time before the castle fell.

The conclusion that the construction of the castle was incomplete by the time of its capture in 1373 also leads to another in relation to the small and apparently basic buildings found within the castle. Bearing in mind that at least one of them was being used to store lime for building purposes, could they not be the medieval equivalent of temporary modern-day building site structures erected without any great fuss to store materials as well as provide shelter to a workforce in inclement weather? Anyone visiting the castle when the prevailing wind is blowing hard with rain from the south-west will be familiar with the need to find shelter.

Any suggestion that Grosnez Castle survived long beyond its capture into the next century is fanciful and not supported by the archaeological evidence (no significant artefacts found consistent with a further life of some ninety years) nor the conduct of medieval warfare (destruction of captured castles to prevent re-occupation and reuse).

It is not surprising that after such a brief life and ignominious end, with its ruins inherited by the minor son of Sir Renaud de Carteret in 1382, the history of Grosnez Castle was destined to be forgotten, only to be discovered by careful analysis of later archaeological finds in the wider context of events within the One Hundred Years' War.

== Other later history ==
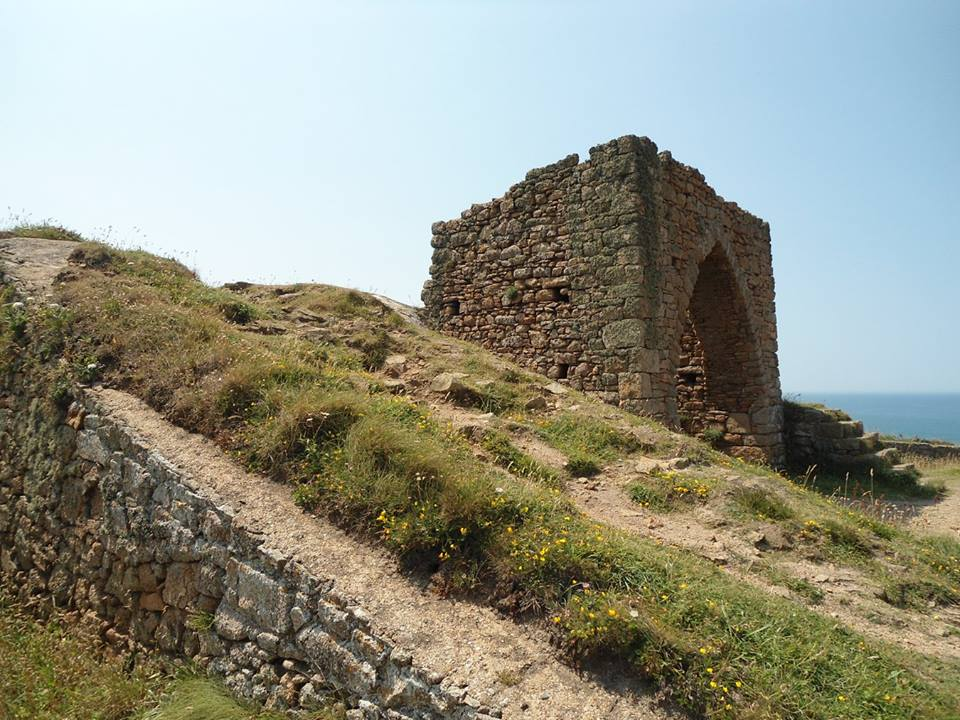
Another view of the castle

On 28 January 1484, after several years of petitioning the Edward IV, Sir Philippe de Carteret, seigneur of St. Ouen - recommended to the King's Grace by his father-in-law the first Governor of Jersey, Sir Richard Harliston, was granted a ″License to Crenelate″ - that is allowed to fortify his manor house. Although not mentioned in the permission, by local tradition, it has been suggested that De Carteret would have had access to the already-worked stone Grosnez Castle which could be re-used in fortifying St. Ouen's Manor. The financial savings could have been important to De Carteret, as - when he had come into his majority - ″trees grew in the Hall of the Manor because his guardians had wasted the substance of the Rentes″ i.e. - embezzled the income - and he was investing heavily in renovating the dilapidated manor buildings.

A favourable marriage and connections may have been a factor to a noblemen whose family had enjoyed better financial circumstances when he married the daughter of the Yorkist supporting Governor Harliston. But that marriage and connections led him into conflict with the second Governor of the island after 1486, Mathew Baker, who was appointed by the new Tudor king, Henry VII after Harliston had been removed from office by armed force following a siege at Gorey Castle. It has to be remembered that Henry VII had defeated Richard III at the Battle of Bosworth Field in 1485 which was the last significant battle in the War of the Roses, an English civil war which had raged on and off for thirty years. Upon Matthew Baker's arrival, when Henry VII ordered a general examination of outstanding accounts by the Exchequer clerks, it was discovered that De Carteret had not paid his taxes to the Exchequer for three years. Since the death of Edward IV, De Carteret was already under some suspicion as a Yorkist supporter, his father-in-law Harliston, the rebel had held out despite the Yorkists losing power, therefore it was inevitable that De Carteret would be required to pay the back taxes he owed the Crown and so began the long running dispute with Matthew Baker.

Whether Sir Philippe actually used the stone from the ruined Grosnez Castle is not recorded. What is clear, however, is that by the 19th century, the archaeological excavations found that the castle's stones had been extensively robbed over the centuries, so perhaps he did.

In 1806, a naval signal station to send messages to Guernsey was established at Grosnez near to where the present racecourse grandstand and other buildings are. It was unconnected to the castle or ruins.

Title to the Castle passed to the Seigneurs of Rozel from the Seigneurs of St. Ouen. (date and citation needed).

== Earlier history ==
The earliest archaeological evidence of human activity on the site of the castle is held in the Société Jersiaise collection curated by Jersey Heritage, which includes prehistoric flint flakes and a flint arrowhead, stone implements and a flint pick. The Paleolithic site of La Cotte à la Chèvre and the remains of a Neolithic dolmen exist nearby to the north-east and east respectively.

== Wildlife ==
On its clifftop location, the Castle and its environs is home to many birds, flora and fauna. They include:

- Peregrine falcon
- Kestrel
- Red-billed Chough
- Dartford Warbler
- Linnet
- Stonechat
- Raven
- Meadow Pipit
- Common Toad
- Common Heather
- Common Gorse
- Cross-leaved Heath
- Spotted Cat's Ear
- low-lying Western Gorse
- Bell Heather

== Geology ==
The bedrock upon which Grosnez Castle is built is coarse-grained granite of St Mary's type.

== Dark Skies ==
Because of its remoteness and distance from houses which cause light pollution at night, Grosnez is one of the best places to view and photograph the night sky. When atmospheric conditions are right, it is also possible to see the Aurora Borealis from Grosnez Castle.

== Modern depiction ==
Grosnez Castle appears on the reverse of the Jersey 50 pence coin.

Grosnez Castle has also been depicted on a number of stamps issued by the Jersey Post Office.

== Citations and references ==
Citations

References

- Dillon, Paddy (2011) Walking on Jersey: 24 routes and the Jersey coastal walk. (Cicerone). ISBN 978-1-85284-288-8
- King, David James Cathcart (1988) The Castle in England and Wales: An Interpretative History. (Routledge). ISBN 978-0-918400-08-6
- Hammond, Reginald J W (ed.), Channel Islands, (London, Ward Lock Red Guides, 1970), p. 63, ISBN 0-7063-5414-1

== Gallery ==
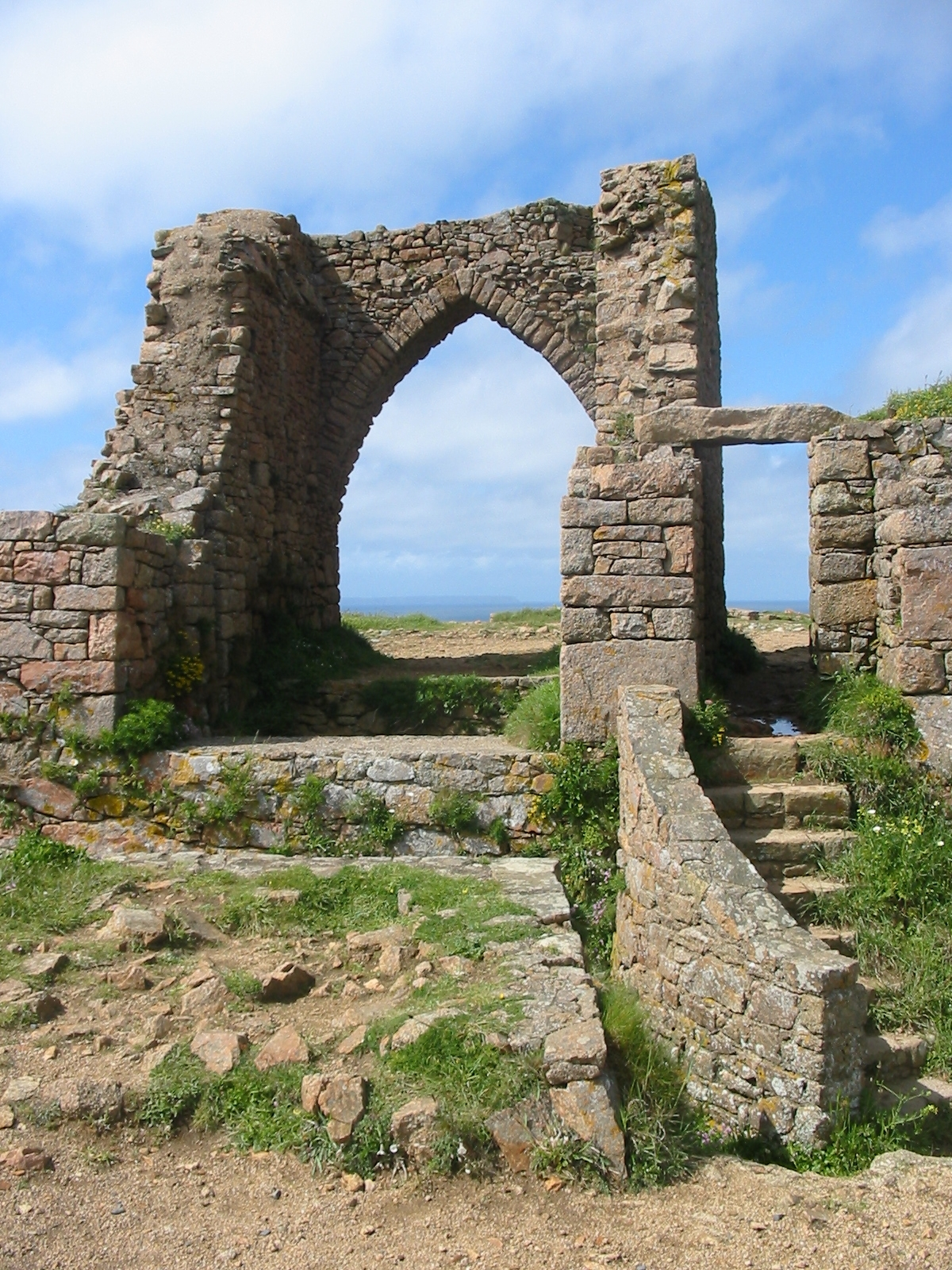

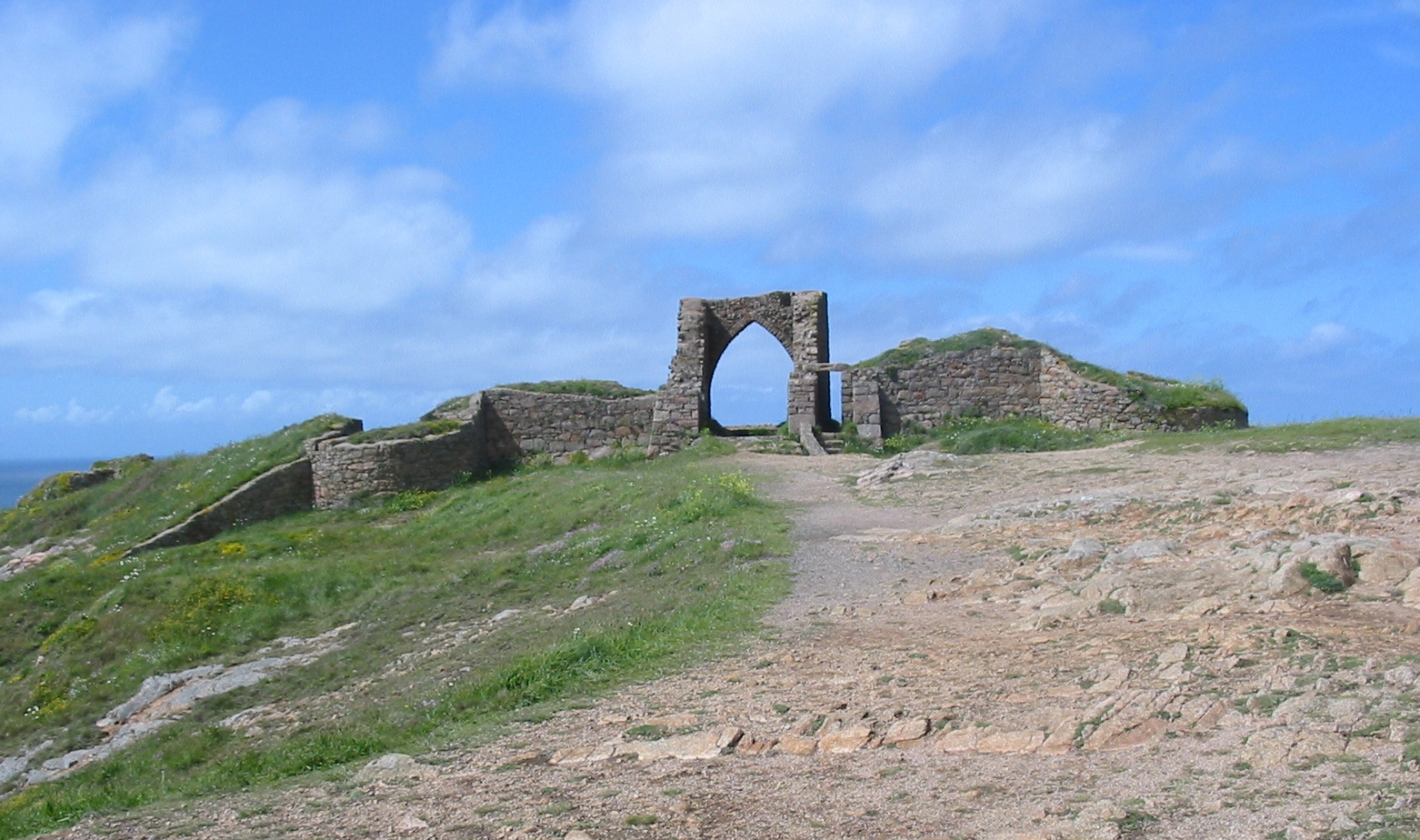

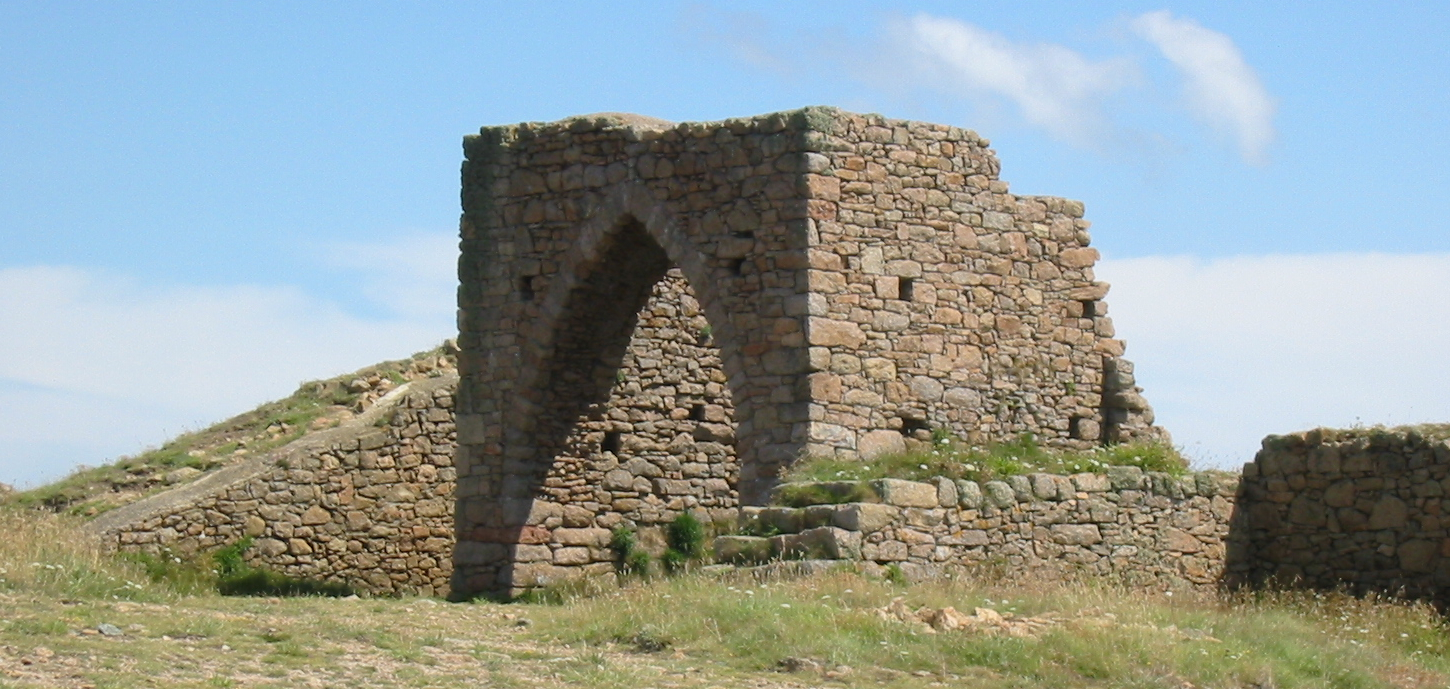

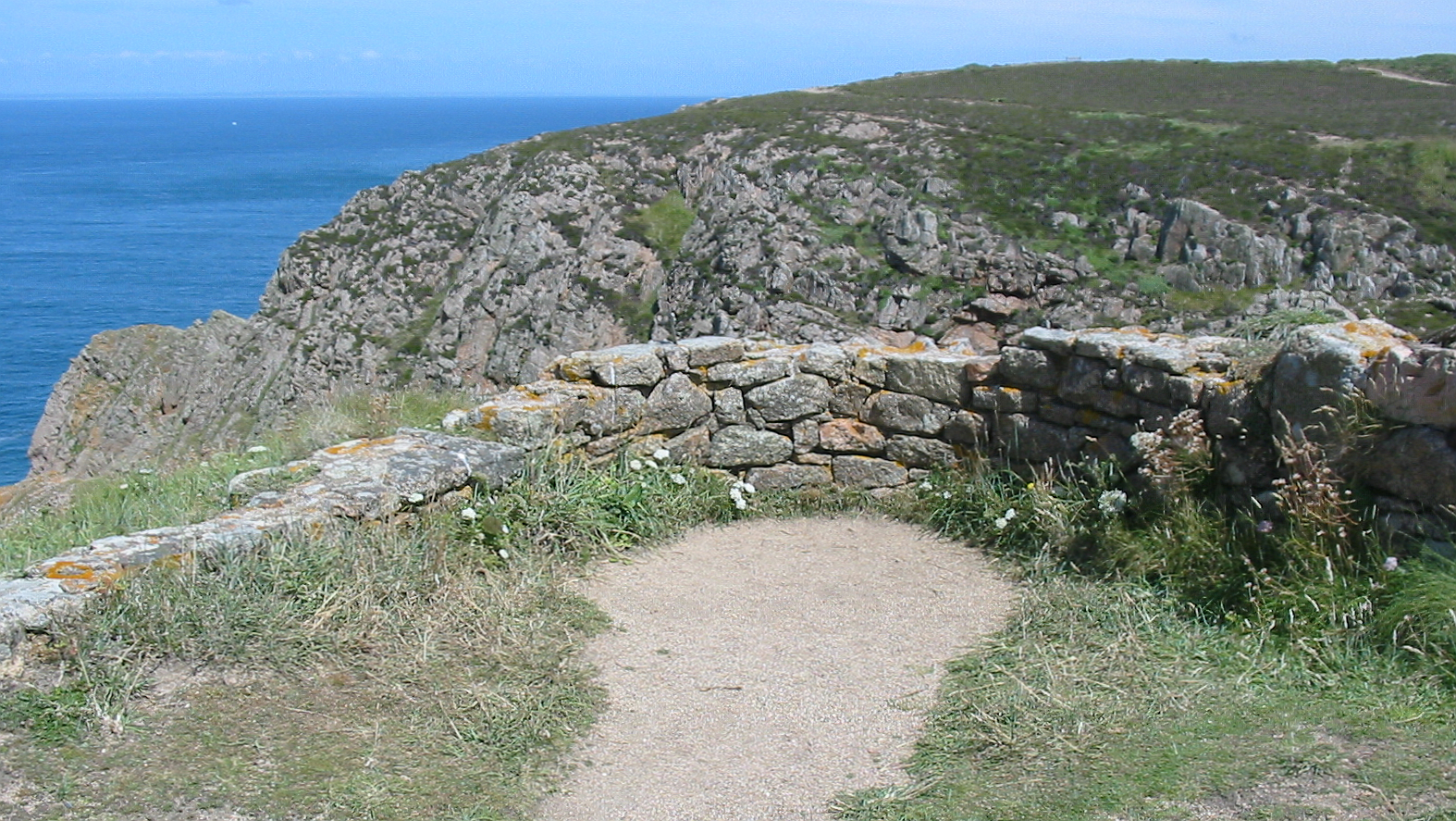
