= Le Couperon dolmen =

Blackhammer Chambered Cairn
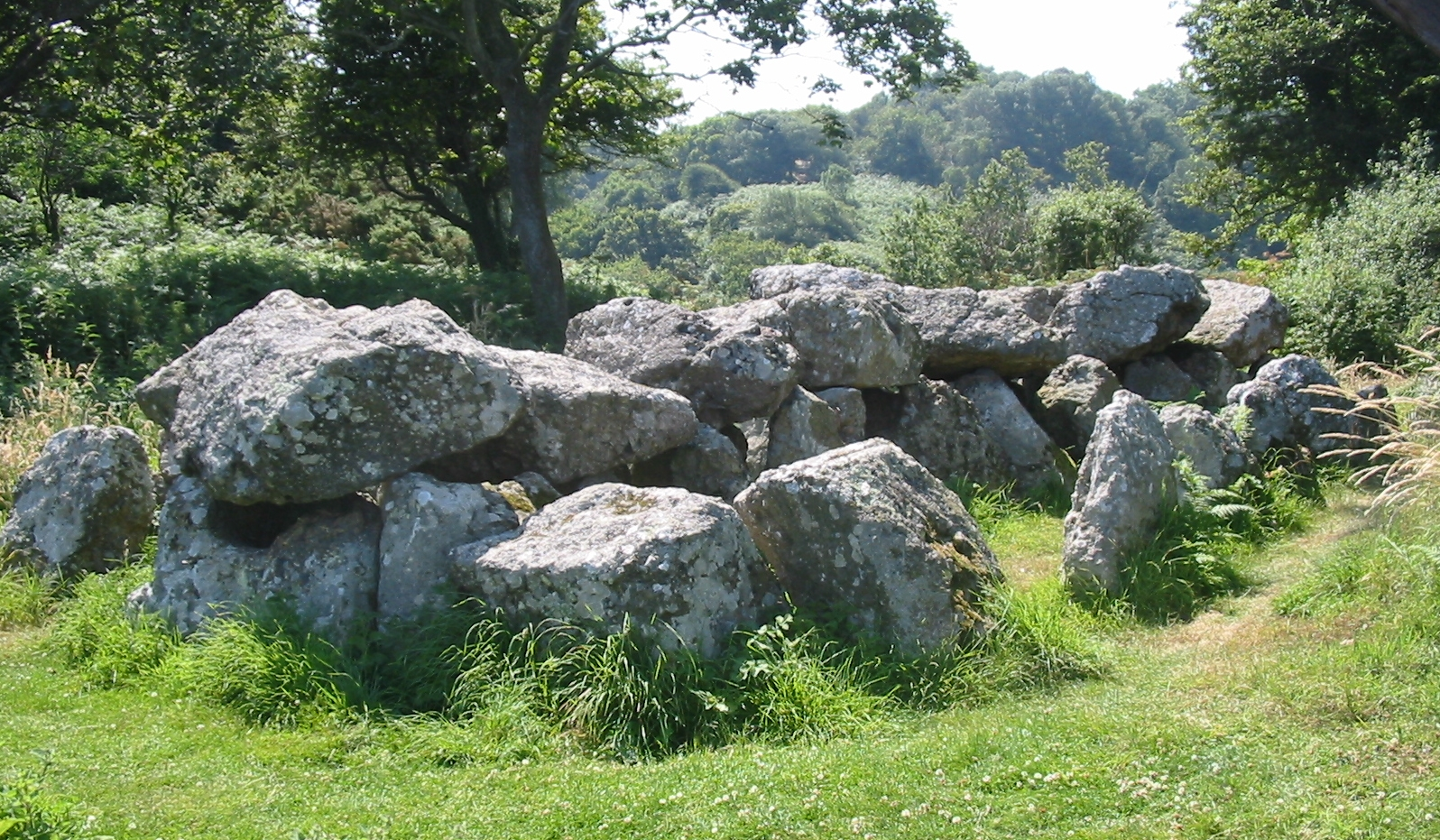
- The dolmen in 2005
- Interactive map of Blackhammer Chambered Cairn
- 49.2343°N 2.0352°W
- Type: Dolmen
- Location: St Martin, Jersey

History
- Built: c. 2750 BC

Site notes
- Material: Stone

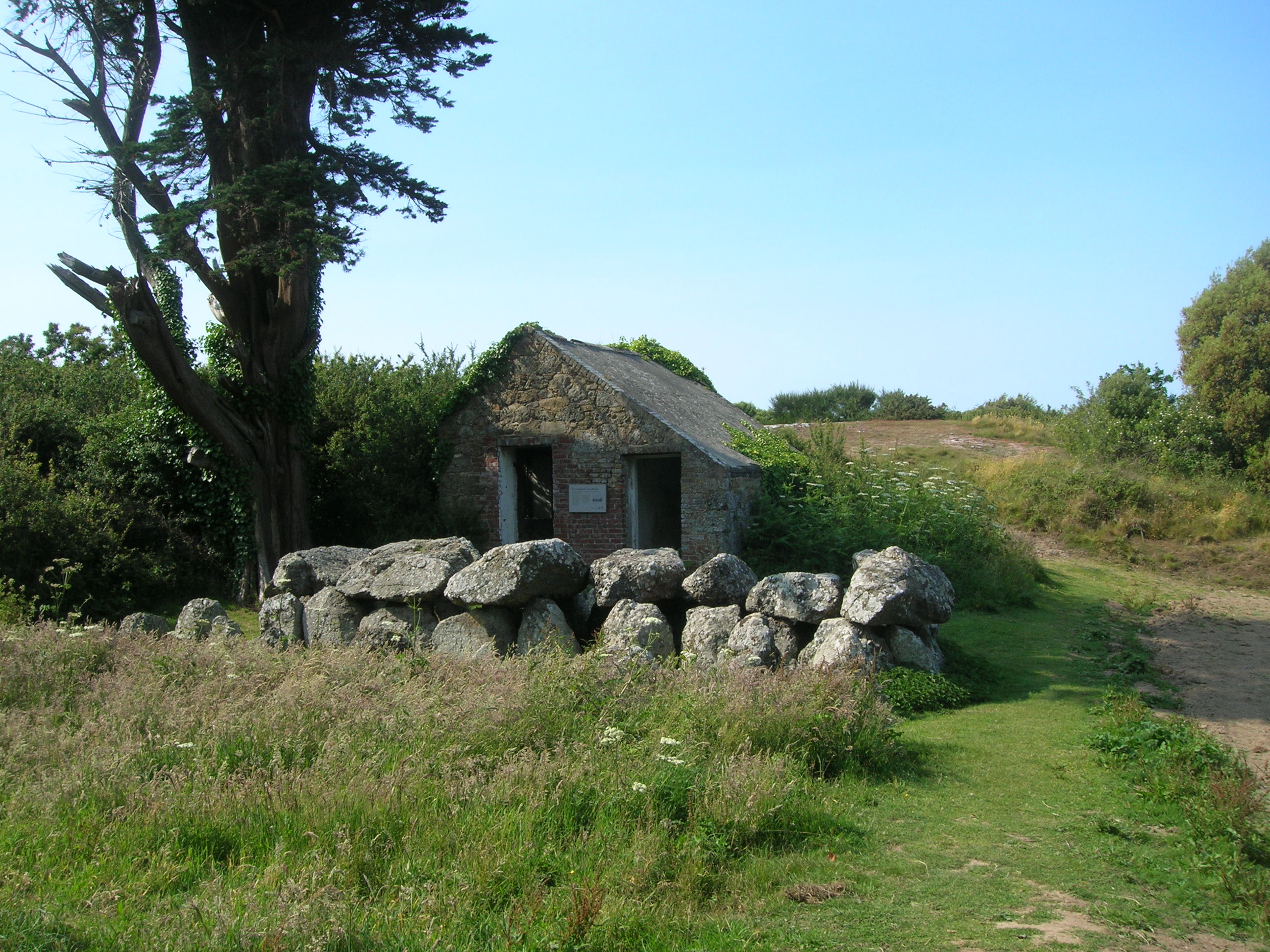
Le Couperon Neolithic dolmen and the guardhouse

Le Couperon is a Neolithic dolmen in the parish of Saint Martin, Jersey. Le Couperon is an around meters long capstone chamber that a long mound had originally covered. It was surrounded by a ring of 18 outer stones, known as peristaliths.

The site was first excavated in 1868. By that time the capstones had fallen into the chamber. The excavators lifted these and a porthole stone and restored the dolmen to what the excavators believed was its original form. In 1919, the Société Jersiaise moved the porthole stone to its current position at the eastern end of the chamber. However, archeologists believe that originally the porthole stone may have stood within the chamber, dividing it into two segments of unequal length, each with its entrance. Finds at the site included a few flint flakes and pottery fragments.

The dolmen stands within a few metres of the Le Couperon guardhouse.
