= King Street, St Helier =

Coordinates: 49.1846°N 2.1078°W

King Street
- Rue de Derrière
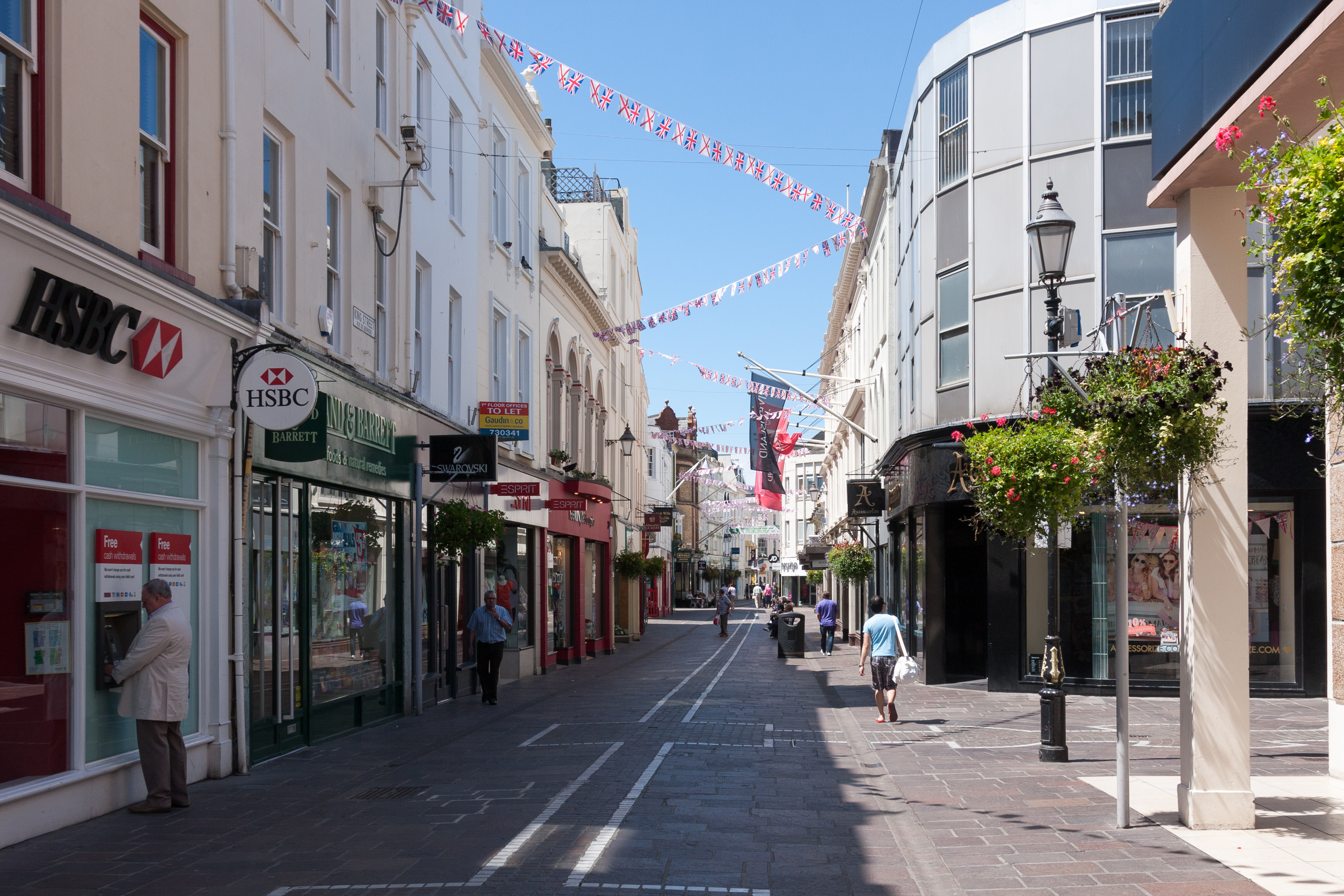
- Looking west along King Street
- Interactive map of King Street
- Native name: Rue d'Driéthe (Jèrriais)
- Location: Saint Helier, Jersey
- Postal code: JE2 4WF; JE2 4WE
- Western end: Charing Cross
- Eastern end: Queen Street

Other
- Known for: Jersey's main shopping street

King Street (Jèrriais: Rue d'Driéthe), also known as Rue de Derrière, is one of the two parts of the high street of Saint Helier in Jersey.

It is a pedestrianised shopping street which runs from Charing Cross at its west end to Queen Street at its east end. It includes a spur that links to Broad Street which is also called King Street in English, but Ruette Haguais in gallicised Jèrriais.

== History ==
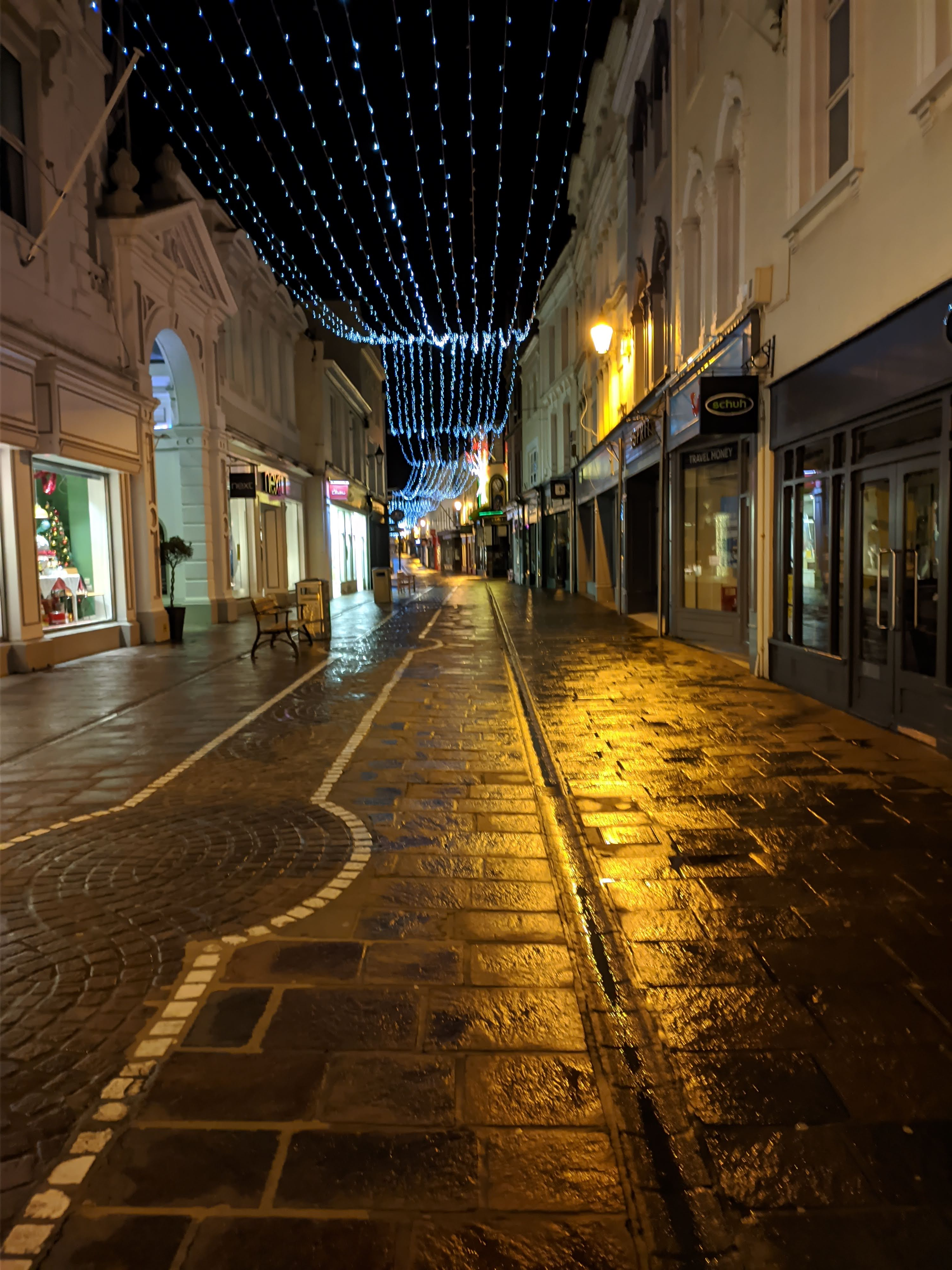
King Street at night during the Christmas period

The street was originally named Rue d'Driéthe or Rue de Derrière (back street in Jèrriais and French), and it was, up until the 19th century, just a small unpaved lane behind the buildings on the north side of the Royal Square and Broad Street. There were no buildings to the north of the road, just an open rural area.

By 1550 the spine formed by what is now King Street/Queen Street was in existence, linking the confluence of Le Grand Douet and St Aubin's Bay to the road east leading across the lands of the Manoir de La Motte (La Colomberie). Branches of Le Grand Douet and Le Faux Bié intersect the street as they flowed through town to the shore. By the second half of the 18th century, the north side of King Street had been developed with solid, originally thatched, town houses with ornamental gardens and orchards behind. Victorian and Edwardian commercial buildings replaced the domestic buildings.

In 1978 as part of the pedestrianisation landscaping, a traditional apple crusher was installed at the junction of Rue de Derrière and Ruette Haguais, and La Croix de la Reine at the junction of King Street and Broad Street.
