= Windmills in Jersey =

Windmills on the island of Jersey

Jersey has had a number of windmills over the centuries. They were mostly corn mills, and about half of those built survive in one form or another.

== Bel Royal Windmill ==
Bel Royal windmill was painted by Isabella Struthers in 1884. The owner in 1886 was a Mr Gosset, who lost the mill due to a bank failure. The new owner demolished the mill and built a terrace of houses in its place.

== Elizabeth Castle Windmill ==
The existence of a windmill at Elizabeth Castle is indicated by the demolition of Windmill Rock, an outcrop in the unfortified Green. Between the construction of the Lower Ward (1636) and the construction of Fort Charles (1646–1647), the northern part of L'Islet was undeveloped militarily. In the centre of this Green stood a windmill on a rocky promontory. In 1646 it was decided to entrench the Green and quarry away the Windmill Rock. Construction of the Windmill Tower was started in 1651 on the site of the Windmill Rock. Buildings constructed in the early 19th century now cover the site. The existence of this mill is disputed.

== Moulin de Grouville ==
The Moulin de Grouville or Moulin de Beauvoir is an early nineteenth century tower mill of five storeys. During World War Two it was converted into an artillery observation tower by the Germans. It is now a house conversion and is listed on the Jersey Register of Historic Buildings.

== St Jean Windmill ==
St Jean Windmill was standing in 1848.

== St Mary Windmill ==
St Mary Windmill was standing in 1848.

== St Ouen's Windmill ==
St Ouen's Windmill, or Moulin de la Campagne is a tower mill in Grantez, Saint Ouen, that was converted into an artillery observation post by the Germans during World War Two. It is listed on the Jersey Register of Historic Buildings.

== St Peter's Windmill ==
St Peter's Windmill is a tower mill that was in existence by 1848. Photographs show it to have been a five-storey tower mill with a domed cap carrying four patent sails and winded by a fantail. The mill did not have a stage. It was derelict for many years until converted into a pub in the 1950s. It has been converted into a shop and restaurant. The sails are not an authentic reproduction of the originals.

== Moulin de Rozel ==
The Moulin de Rozel is a tower mill built in 1799. The mill was dismantled in 1916 and during World War Two it was converted into an artillery observation post. It is listed on the Jersey Register of Historic Buildings.

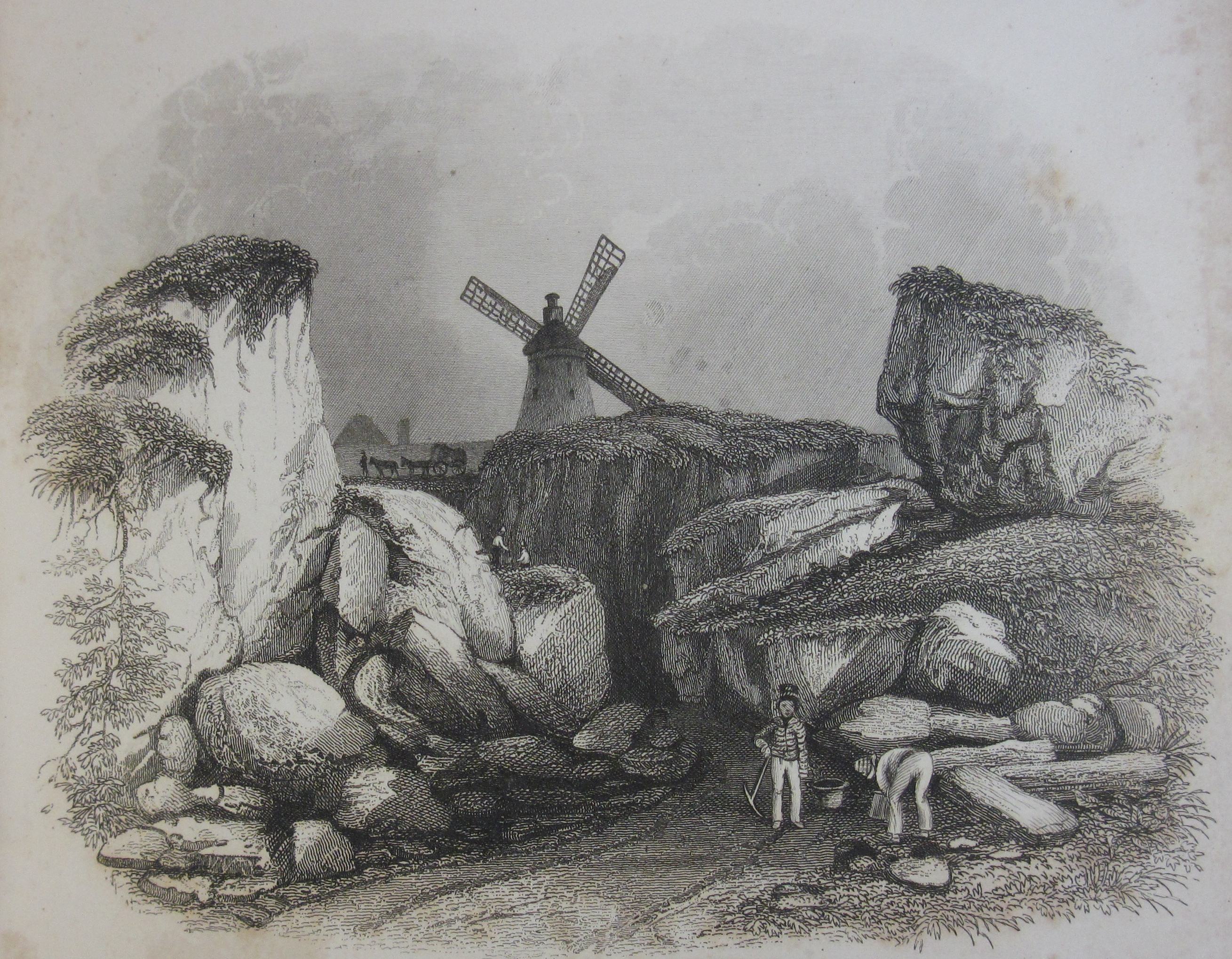
Windmill, Mont Mado, Saint John, published 1840

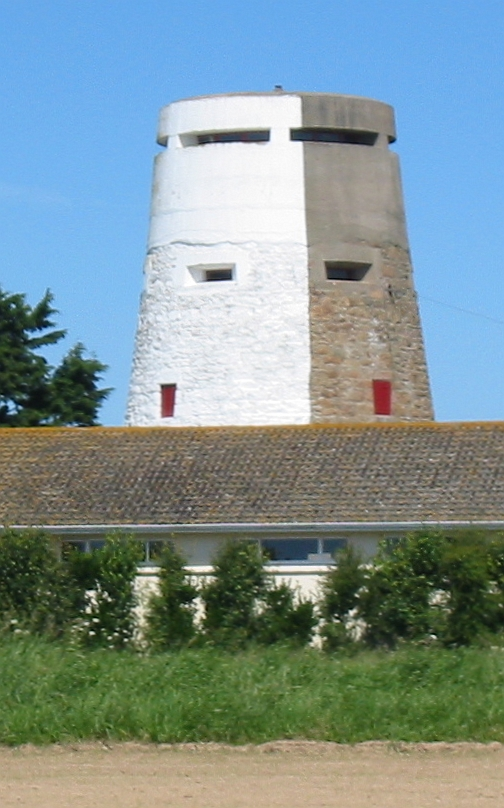
St. Ouen's Windmill

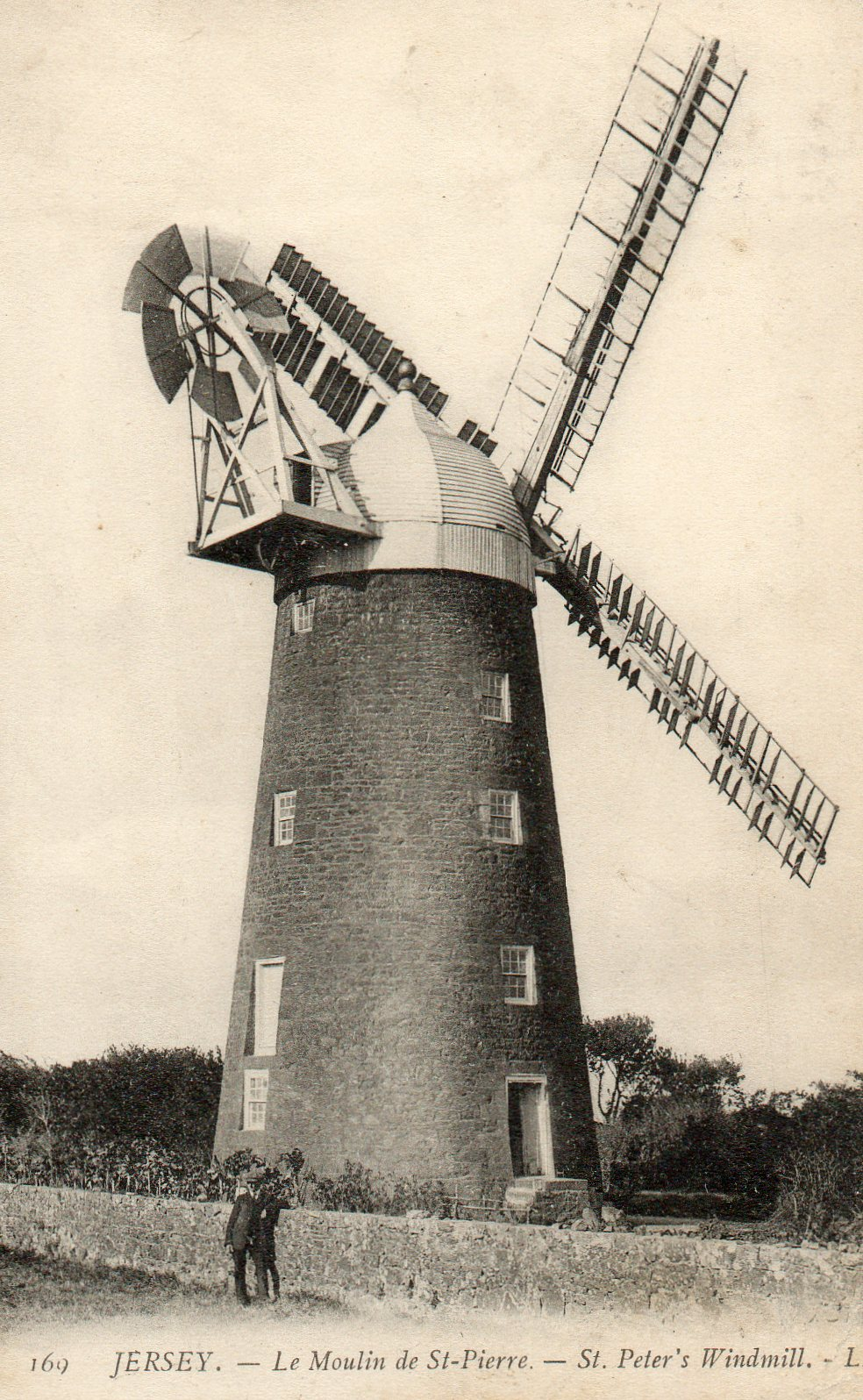
St Peter's Mill c1906

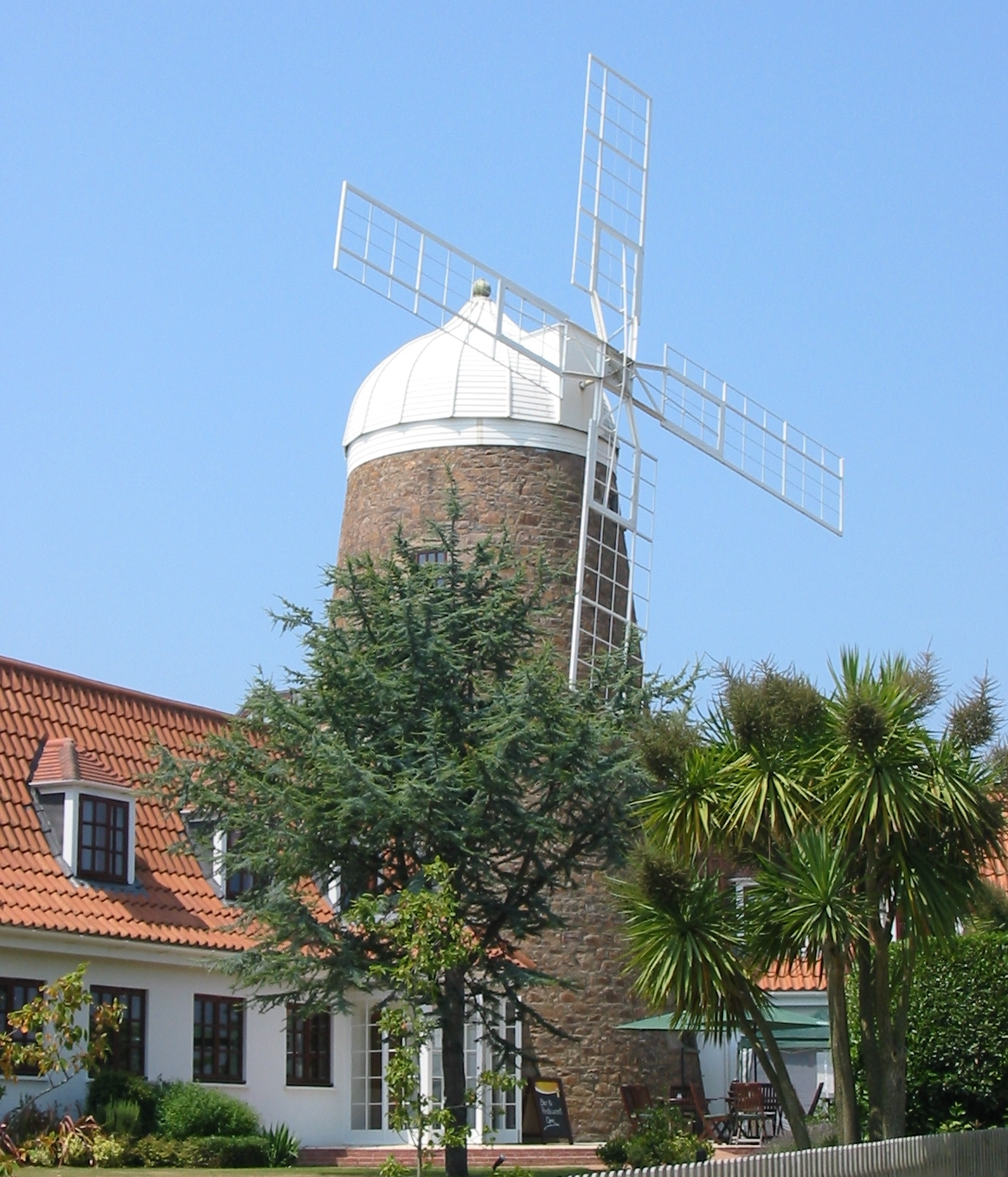
St Peter's Windmill

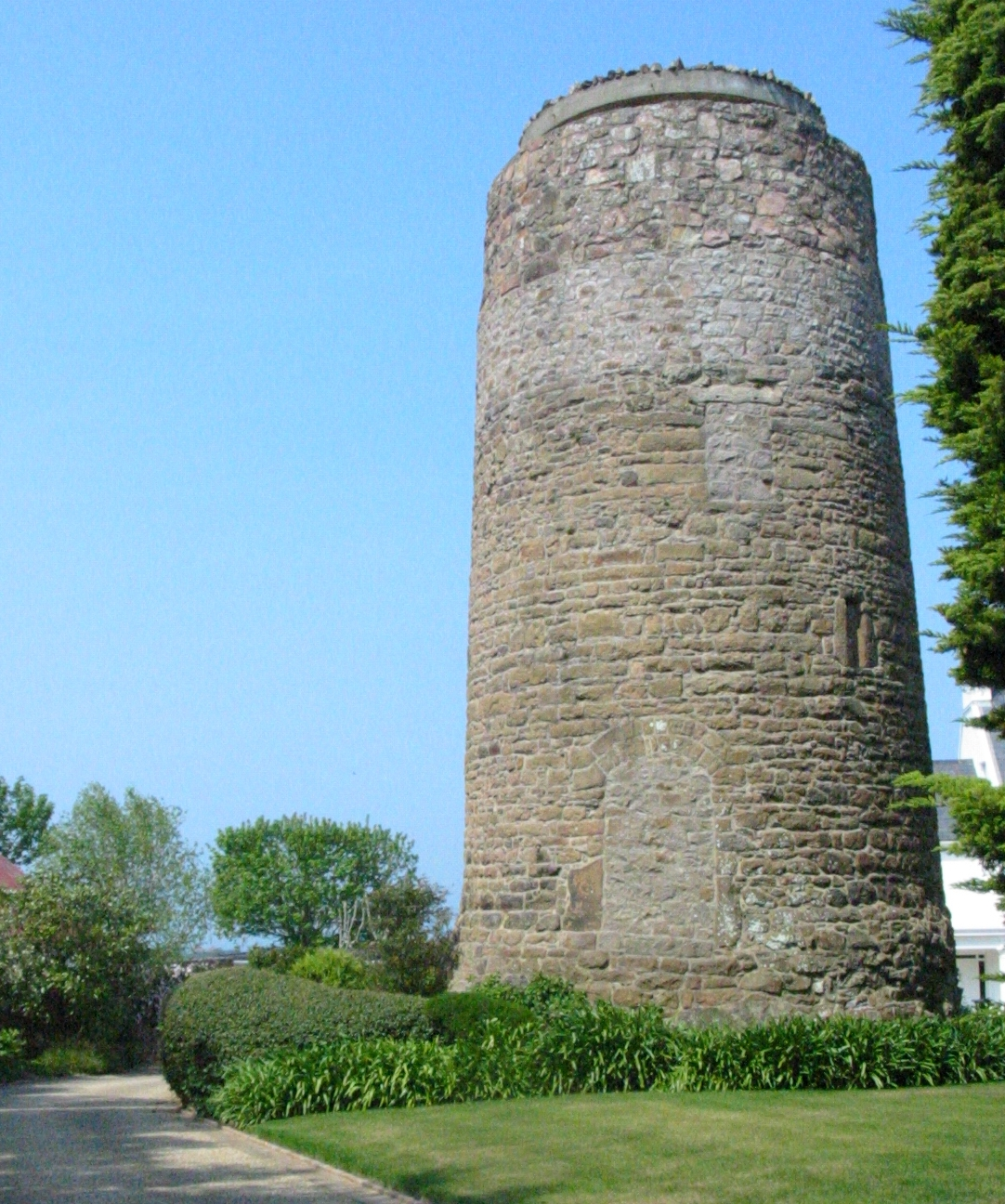
Moulin de Rozel

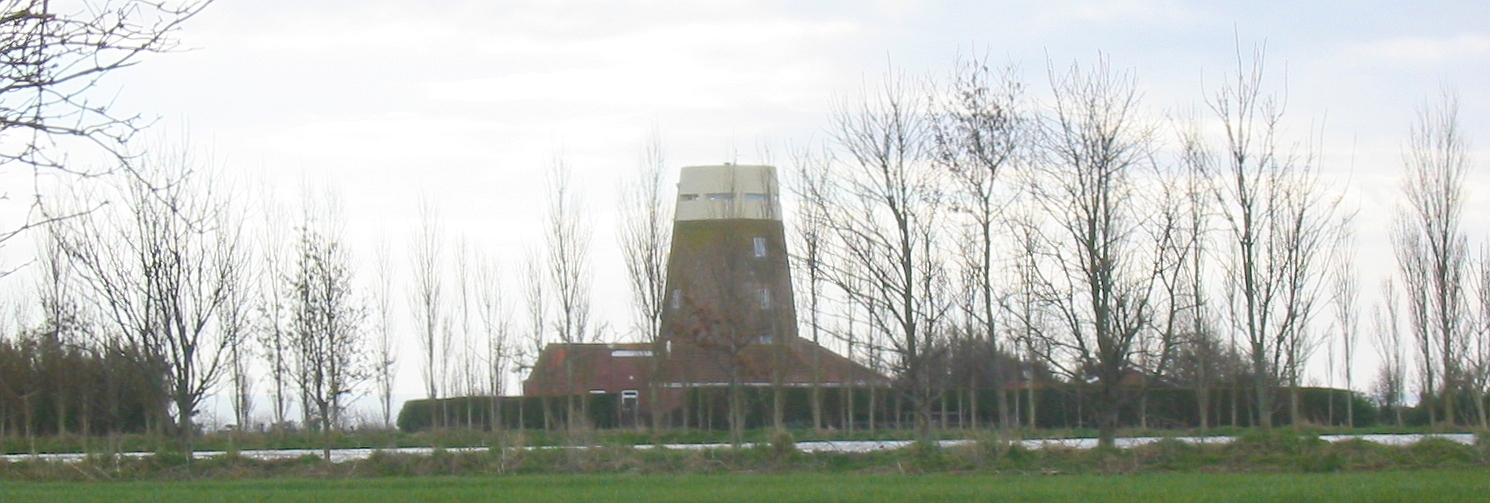
Moulin de Grouville

== Books ==
Knocker, G S (1936). The Windmills of Jersey.
