= Sacred Heart Church, Saint Aubin =

Sacred Heart Church
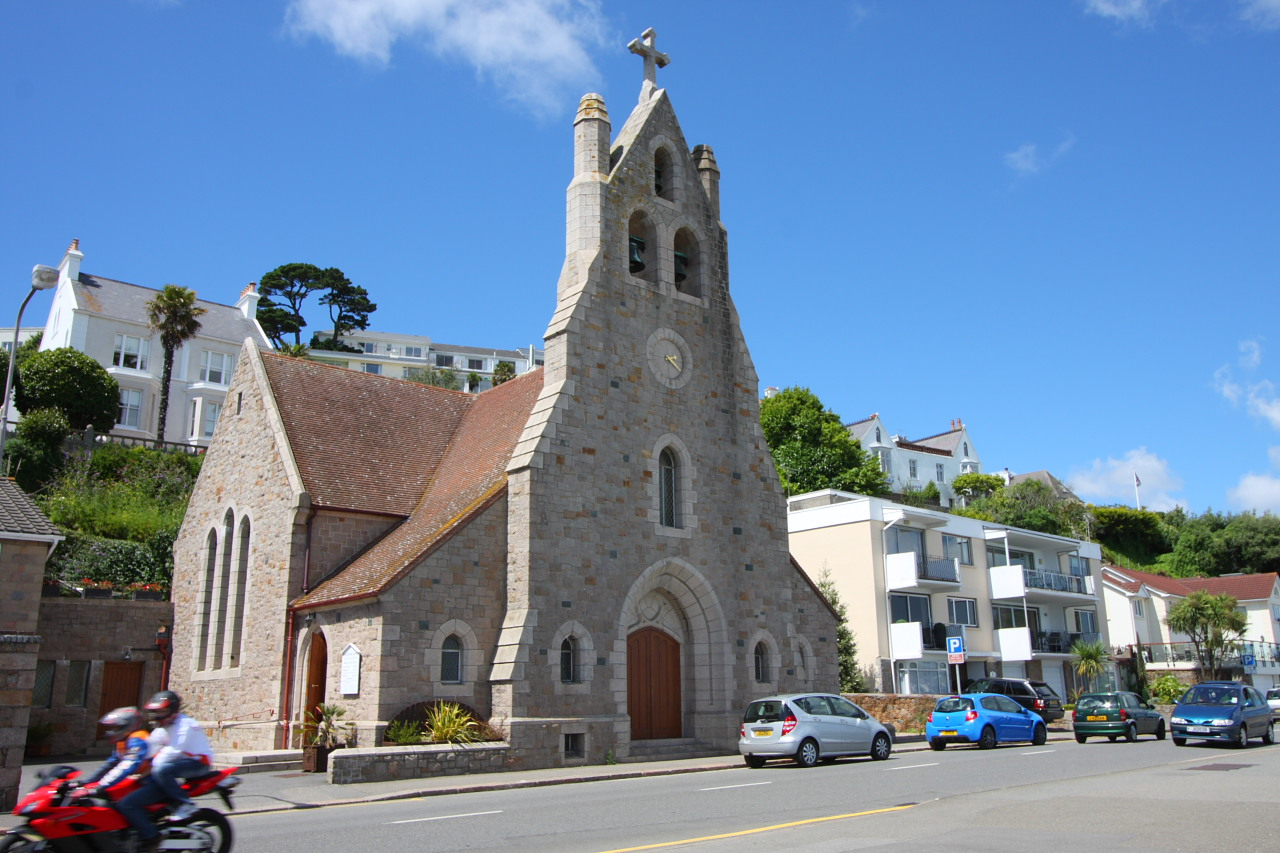
- Sacred Heart Church
- Location: St Aubin, Saint Brélade, Jersey
- Country: Bailiwick of Jersey
- Denomination: Roman Catholic Church

History
- Consecrated: 1947

Architecture
- Heritage designation: Jersey Grade 3 Listed Building
- Style: Gothic Revival
- Groundbreaking: 1936

Administration
- Diocese: Portsmouth

The Sacred Heart Church is the name given to a religious building affiliated with the Catholic Church which is located in the town of St. Aubin in the Ballwick of Jersey, part of the Channel Islands. The island of Jersey itself is a self-governing parliamentary democracy with its own financial, legal and judicial systems, and the power of self-determination.

The temple follows the Roman or Latin rite and depends on the jurisdiction of the Diocese of Portsmouth (Dioecesis Portus Magni) based in Portsmouth, southern England, UK, and was created in 1882 under the pontificate of Pope Leo XIII.

The first stone church was laid in 1936, construction began its work the following year but it was not until 1947 when it was inaugurated and blessed.

== See also ==
- Catholic Church in Jersey
- Sacred Heart Church (disambiguation)
