= Fox Tower, Cumbria =

Folly tower in Cumbria, England

Coordinates: 54.5413°N 2.3309°W

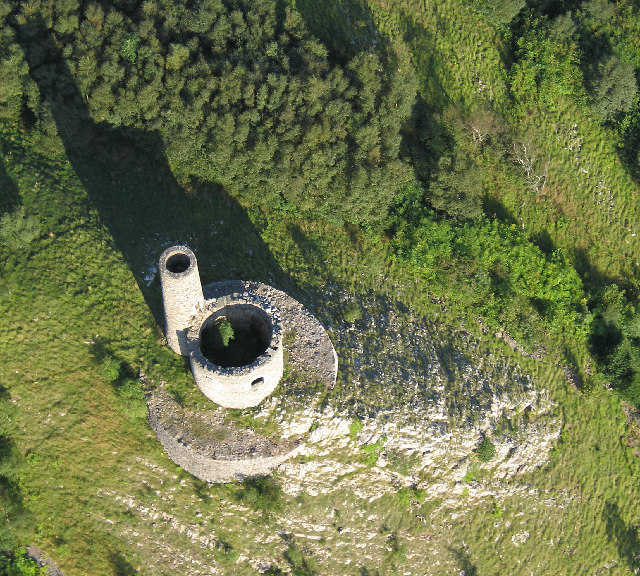
Fox Tower, Helbeck Wood in 2005

Fox Tower is a tower built by John Metcalf Carleton, an industrial entrepreneur, as a folly in 1775 on his large estate next to Brough, a village in Cumbria, England. The folly can be seen from Brough Castle and the road A66 road looking towards the fells. The tower is now closed to the public.
