= Le Couperon guardhouse =

Historic landmark

Coordinates: 49.2343°N 2.0352°W

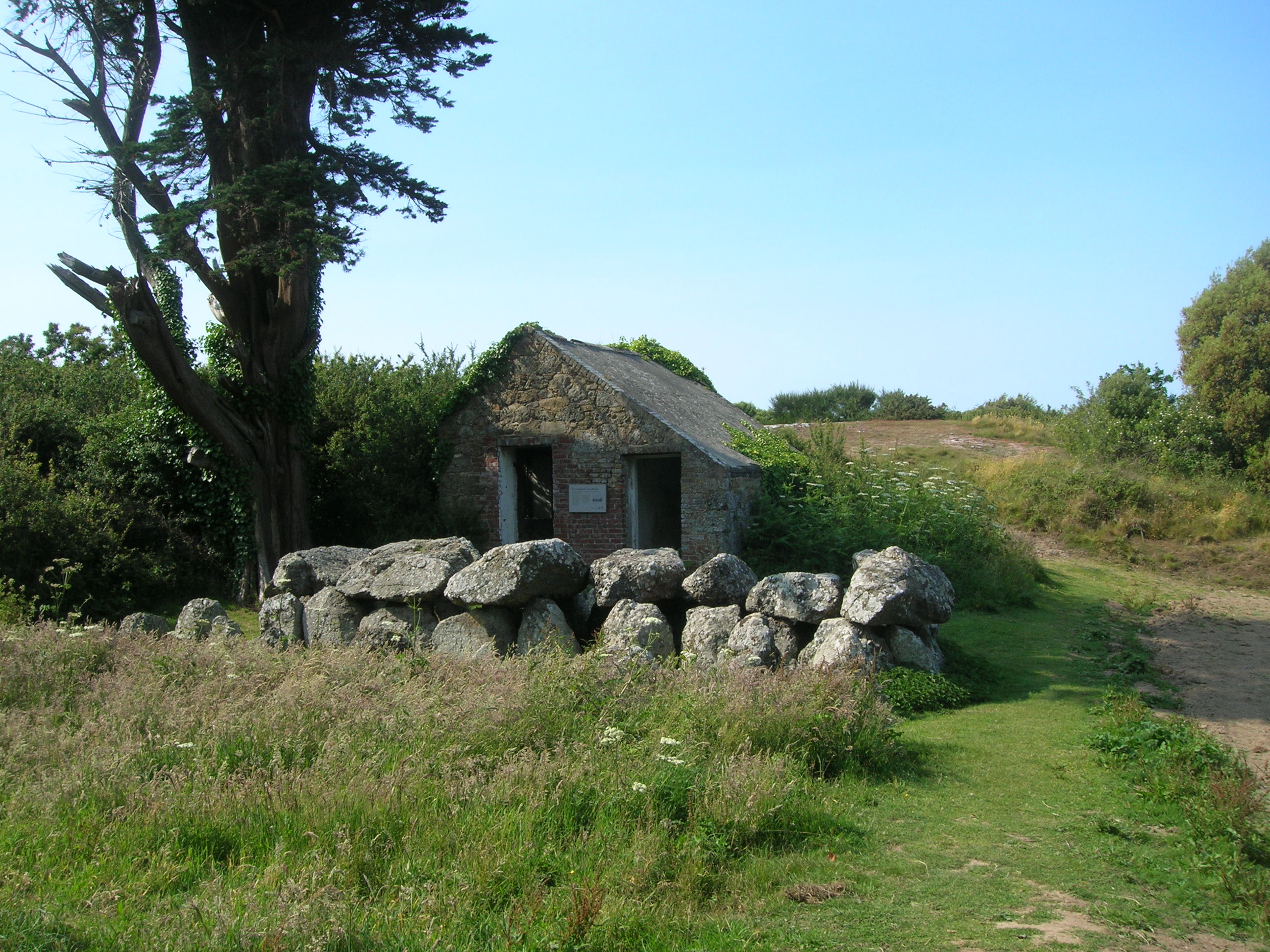
Le Couperon Neolithic dolmen and the guardhouse

Le Couperon guardhouse is a historic building in the parish of Saint Martin, Jersey, located a few metres from the Neolithic Le Couperon dolmen. The original guardhouse was built in 1689, and was later extended and modified over the centuries. It is one of the few surviving coastal guardhouses constructed during the late 18th and early 19th centuries, as part of Jersey’s fortification programme in response to the threat of French invasion.

The building is single-storey with a rectangular plan and an asymmetrical pitched roof. It is constructed of local stone. Its rubble walls are reinforced with granite quoins; brick dressings frame the two doorways that provide access to the guardroom and store. It served as a magazine for storing powder and as a shelter for the Jersey militia gun crews who manned the battery on the headland above. The battery commanded Rozel Bay, and by 1812, mounted two 24-pounder muzzle-loading guns that fired over a low wall. The defensive wall has since disappeared.

Le Couperon guardhouse is preserved as a listed historic site and one of the surviving fortifications in Rozel Seigneurie, Jersey. It is located 24 km from St.Helier, 760 km from Bricgstōw, and 870 km from London.
