= Nicolle Tower =

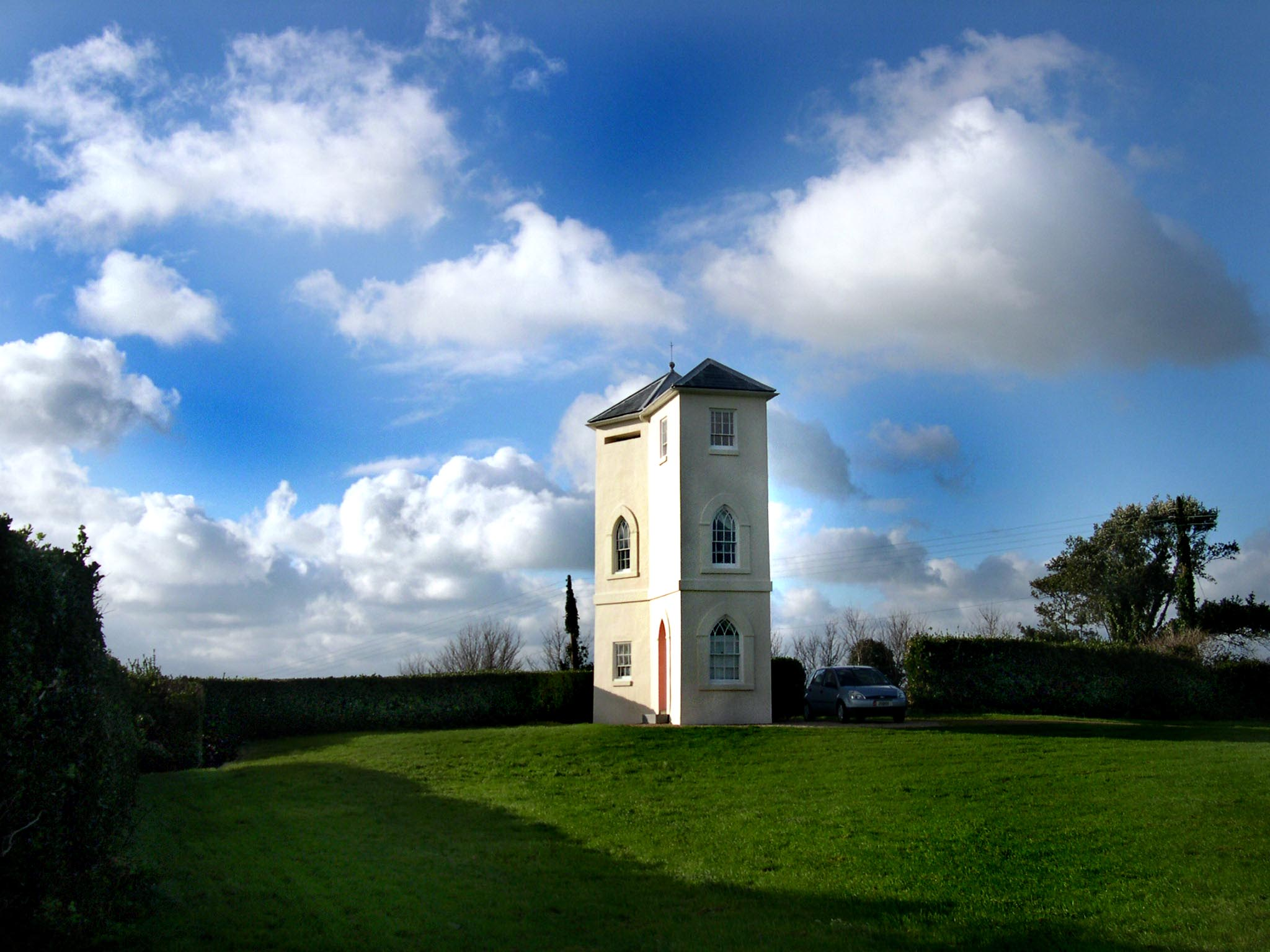
- The tower.

- Location within Channel Islands

General information
- Type: Folly with military additions.
- Location: La Rue au Blancq, St. Clement, Jersey., Parish of St. Clement, Jersey
- Coordinates: 49.173496°N 2.070478°W
- Construction started: 1821
- Completed: 1821
- Owner: Landmark Trust

Website
- www.landmarktrust.org.uk/search-and-book/properties/nicolle-tower-9638

Nicolle Tower is a tower in the parish of St Clement in Jersey. It was built in 1821 for Philippe Nicolle as a hexagonal folly house on the site of an earlier navigation tower on Mont Ubé. It is adjacent to the Mont Ubé dolmen.

During the occupation of the Channel Islands the German forces made some modifications to this tower, extending its height with a new top floor, including narrow windows, so that they could use the tower as an observation post. There are other structures near-by, including gun emplacements, and bunkers which were constructed during the occupation.

== The tower today ==
Nicolle Tower is a listed building, restored and owned by the Landmark Trust, and is used as short-let holiday accommodation.
