= Castleboy Tower =

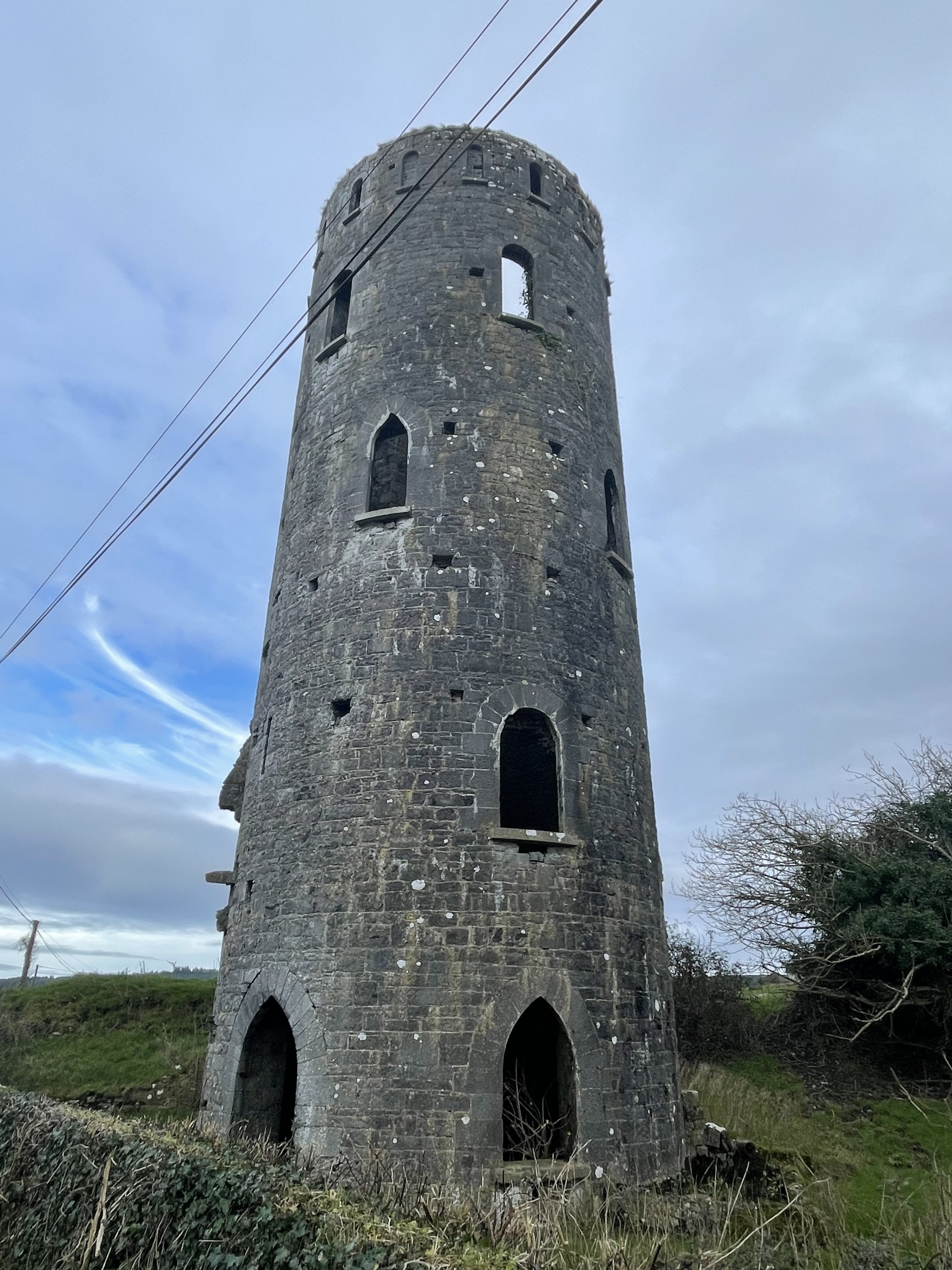
- Castleboy Tower in 2026

- Location within Ireland

General information
- Type: Folly tower
- Classification: Ruin
- Location: Castleboy, Killinan, County Galway, Ireland
- Coordinates: 53.1508°N 8.69889°W
- Estimated completion: 1800–1850

Technical details
- Material: Limestone
- Floor count: 5

Castleboy Tower is a 19th-century folly in the townland of Castleboy, Killinan, County Galway, Ireland. It was once part of the Castleboy House demesne owned by the Persse family and was perhaps converted into a folly from an earlier building. It is built of squared limestone over five floors, with a number of windows and an arched doorway. Following the demolition and division of the Castleboy estate by the Land Commission, the tower was left stranded on one side of a newly constructed road. Along with some walls of the stable yard, the tower is all that remains of the estate. It is a Protected structure.

== History ==
Castleboy Tower was built around 1800–1850. It was constructed with snecked squared limestone. It is circular in shape and has five floors, with pointed and round-headed windows and a pointed arched doorway. Further openings are square-headed and have relieving arches. The very top of the tower has a number of round-headed openings. An assessment by the National Built Heritage Service branded the tower an "impressive eye-catcher" and felt it makes "a strong impression in the landscape" with its façade "enlivened by tooled stone detailing."

The tower was once part of the Castleboy House demesne and estate owned by the Persse family, who also lived at the nearby Roxborough estate, which was the birthplace of Lady Gregory. Writer and former vice-president of the Irish Georgian Society, Robert O'Byrne believed the tower may have been converted into a folly from an earlier building on the site. When the Land Commission demolished and divided up the Castleboy estate, the tower was left standing on one side of a newly constructed road, which allowed access to the farms nearby. Only the tower and some walls from the stable yard remain of the estate. Castleboy Tower is a Protected structure.

In January 1979, Castleboy Tower was featured in an RTÉ News report on the popular trend of restoring towers and castles in County Galway. An estate agent told reporter Jim Fahy that the tower had been attracting enquires from all over Ireland, as well as Europe and America. He did not know what the "great interest is" in towers like Castleboy, but he told Fahy that people wanted to "do them up" and live in them. He also pointed out that the tower might attract buyers in literary circles as it was in the centre of the Irish Literary Revival, with its connection to Lady Gregory and close proximity to Edward Martyn in Tullira and Count Florimond de Basterot in Duras. He estimated the cost to purchase the tower with a quarter of an acre of land was £10,000.
