= Religion in Jersey =

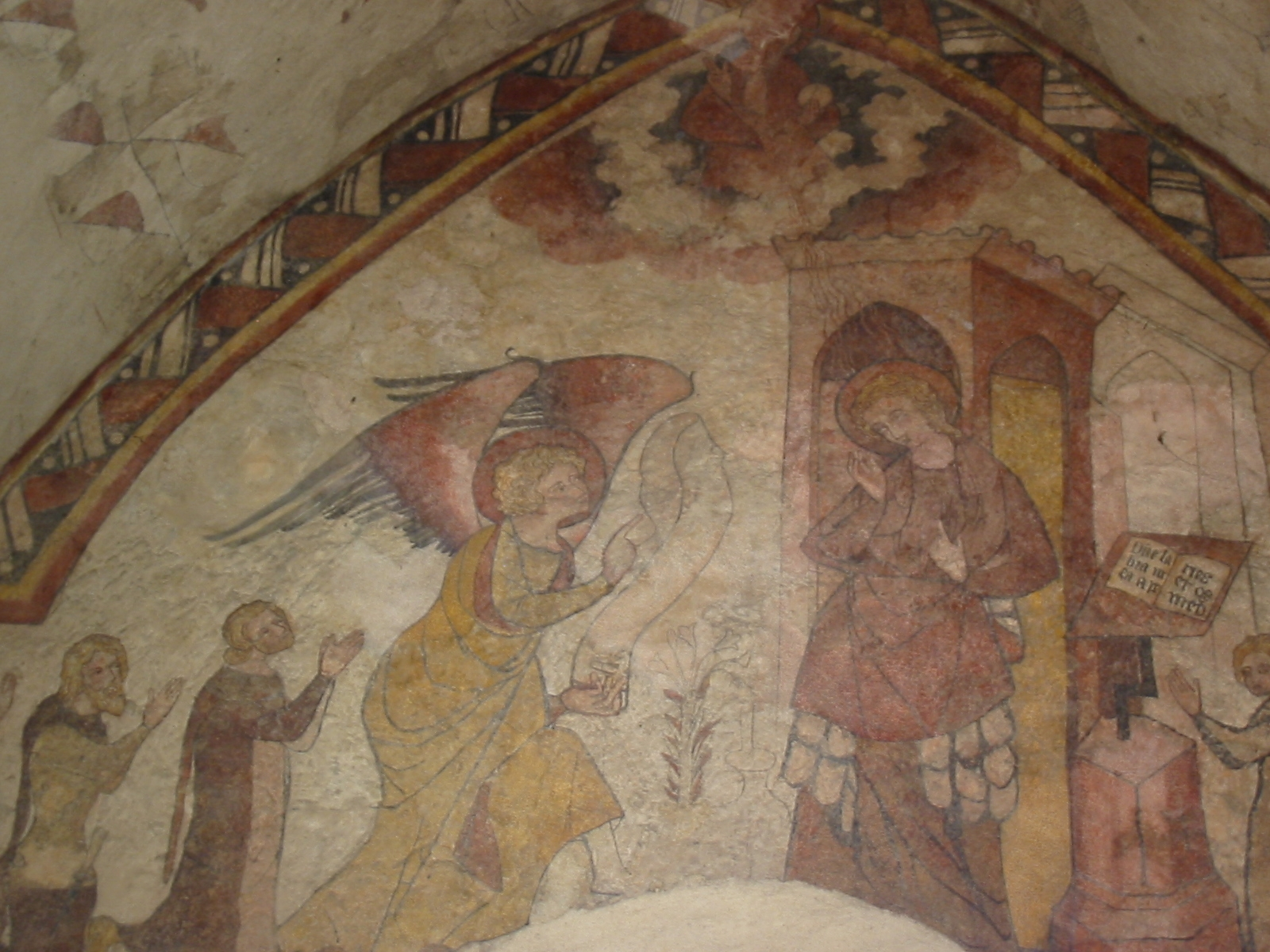
The wall paintings of the Chapelle ès Pêcheurs (Fishermen's Chapel) are a rare survival of the iconoclasm of the Reformation in Jersey.

Despite its small size, the population of Jersey is made of people with a diverse range of religions and beliefs. Traditionally seen as a Christian island, Jersey's established church is the Church of England, and Anglicanism and Catholicism are practised on the island in roughly equal numbers. Together, these religions account for around half the population of Jersey. Other denominations of Christianity and other religions such as Islam, Judaism, Sikhism, and Buddhism account for handfuls of people on the island. In recent years, irreligion has been an increasing force in Jersey, with two fifths of the population identifying as having no religion. This number rises to 52% for Jersey people under 35.

== History ==
=== Before Christianity ===
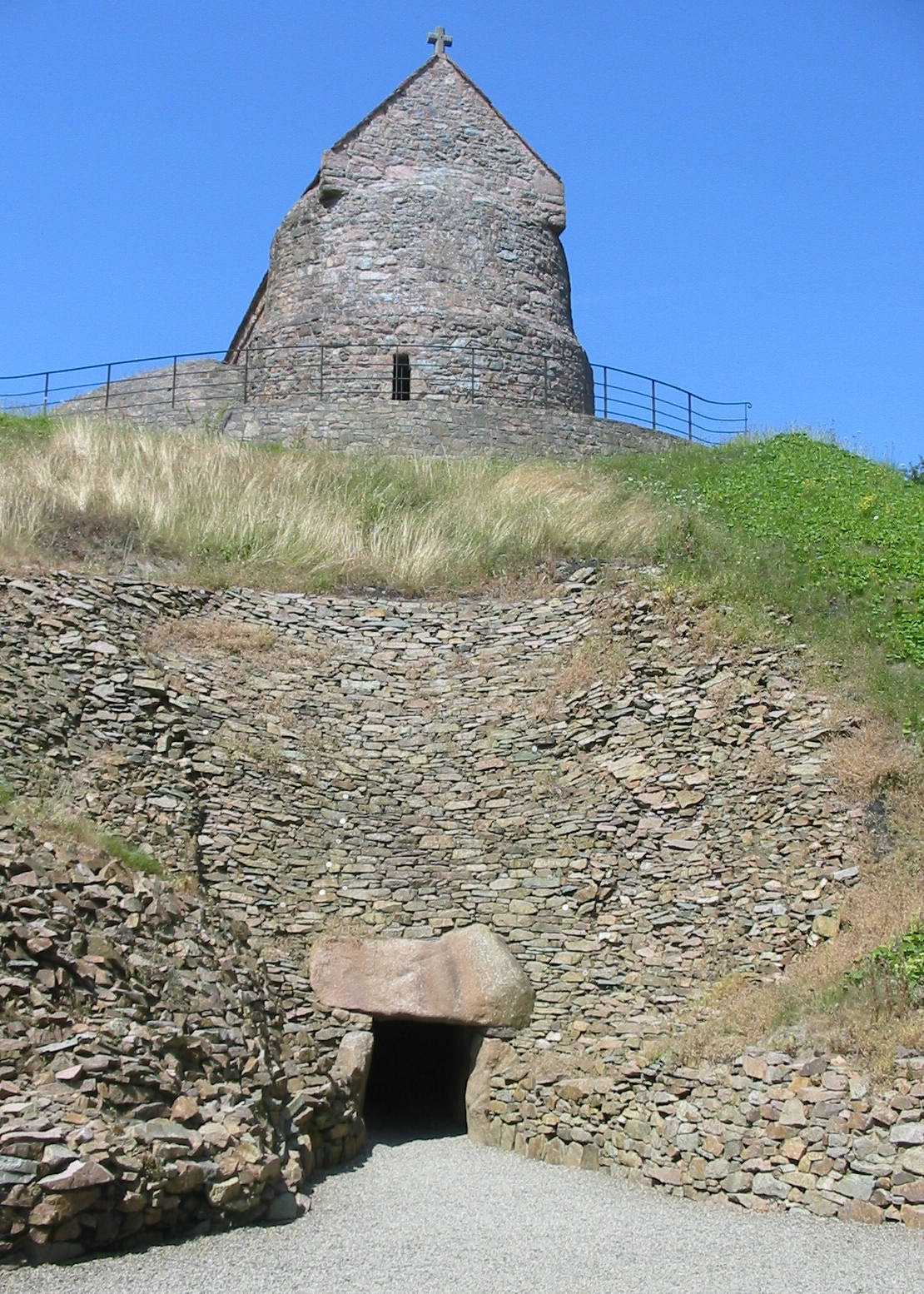
Restored entrance to the Neolithic tomb (with a mediaeval chapel on the mound) at La Hougue Bie.

In the Neolithic period religious activity in the settled communities is marked by the building of ritual burial sites known as dolmens, from which food and personal items such as jewelry, spindle whorls, pottery, tools and animal bones have been excavated at La Hougue Bie (a ritual site used around 3500 BC). These finds indicate that Neolithic settlers possibly believed in an afterlife much like many modern religions, the burial of the dead with their belongings showing similarities to the burial process in the Egyptian religion. However recent excavations at La Hougue Bie by archaeologist Mark Patton, together with consideration of solar alignments, suggest that the Jersey Dolmens functioned more as centres of worship like cathedrals or churches, where burials are incidental to the main function.

=== Christianity ===
There is some evidence from parish names of Celtic missions to the islands, notably Saint Brelade in Jersey and Saint Samson in Guernsey. Apart from place names and one note in the Life of Samson no documentary evidence is available.

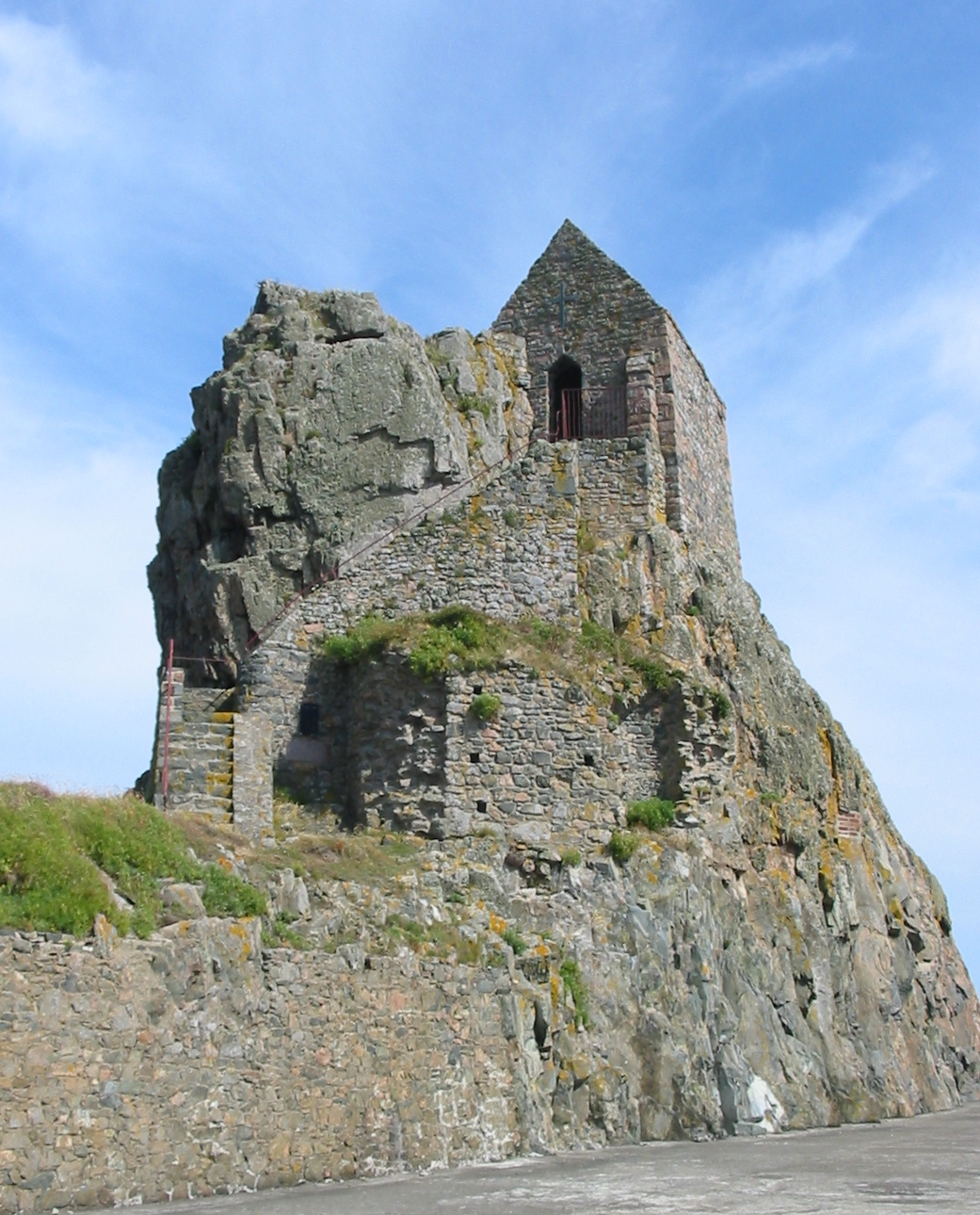
The Hermitage of Saint Helier lies in the bay off Saint Helier, Jersey and is accessible on foot at low tide.

Sometime between 535 and 545, Helier, who was to become Jersey's patron saint, went to the island bringing the gospel. The island of Jersey remained part of the Duchy of Normandy until 1204 when King Philip II Augustus of France conquered the duchy from King John of England. The islands remained in the personal possession of the king of England and were described as being a Peculiar of the Crown. However, the island continued to be part of the Norman Diocese of Coutances and was reluctant to come under the wing of the English church because it had many cultural ties with Normandy.

In 1378, the island was placed in an awkward position during the Western Schism. The island was under the Diocese of Coutances in France, while administered politically by England. Therefore, as France supported Clement's claim to the Papal see and England supported Urban's, there was tension in the island between the Government and Church. The Warden ordered the banishment of the Dean, labelled a 'supporter of the anti-Pope'. The island was placed under an Urbanite Administrator, as a separately administered part of the Coutances diocese.

The island embraced the French Calvinist form of Protestantism during the Reformation, especially under the influence of French language pamphlets and books from Geneva, France and the Low Countries. Orders were received to remove all signs of the Papal Church in 1547. In 1550 and 1551 church property was sold for the benefit of the crown. The island remained under the diocese of Coutances until 1569.

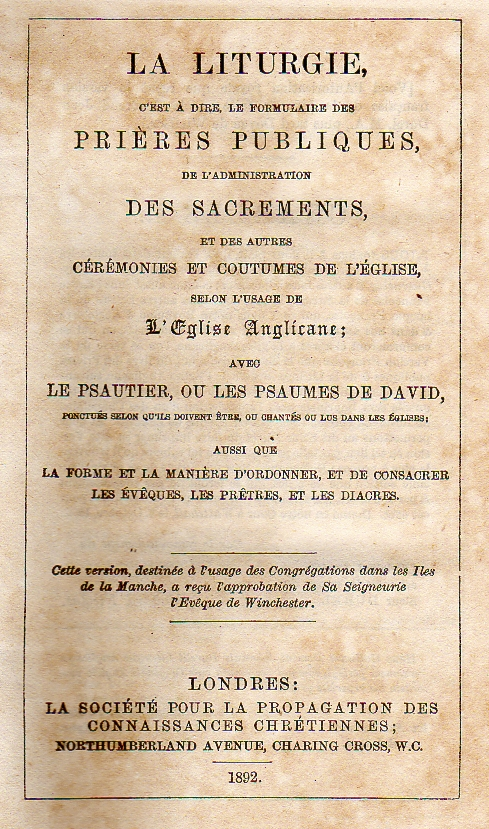
The Book of Common Prayer was translated into French by Jerseyman Jean Durel, later Dean of Windsor, and published for use in the Channel Islands in 1663 as Anglicanism was established as the state religion after the Stuart Restoration.

The reign of Queen Mary I and King Philip (1553-1558) was especially significant. Important Protestant religious leaders in Jersey and Guernsey fled to Geneva, and when they returned after Mary's death, they had taken on much of the severe form of Calvinism formulated there by Calvin, and set up Consistory Courts. Another factor was a reaction against the burning of heretics in the islands. In neighboring Guernsey, Foxe records the remarkable death of the Protestant Perotine Massey, one of the Guernsey Martyrs, who gave birth while being burnt at the stake. Her newborn child was returned to the flames by the Catholic Bailiff.

There also was a sudden influx from France of Huguenots — the name given to French Calvinists — as Louis XIV revoked the Edict of Nantes in 1685, effectively depriving them of the freedom to practice their religion by brutal methods : (in accordance of catholic hierarchy): prosecutions : prisons, galley slaves, no property rights, "dragonnades" etc, etc

The style of worship was resolutely Calvinist. Queen Elizabeth I left Jersey and Guernsey more or less in charge of their own affairs, because of political expedience: Protestant islanders would be in opposition to Catholic France.

Although Jersey was transferred to the Diocese of Winchester in 1569, it was not until the Governorship of Sir John Peyton in 1603, under James I, that the forms of the Anglican church were restored to Jersey. In 1620 David Bandinel was appointed the first Dean of Jersey since the Reformation. Anglicanism then became and remained the official religion of the island. In 2014 the Diocese changed, after 500 years, to the Diocese of Canterbury.

==== Post-Reformation Catholicism ====
There were several waves of Catholic immigration, notably in the 1790s during the French Revolution, in the 1830s and 1840s with the influx of Irish laborers and towards the end of the 19th century with the settlement of Catholic religious institutes.

In 1880, a Jesuit college from Laval, France, which had been expelled under the Third Republic, relocated to Jersey.

==== Methodism ====
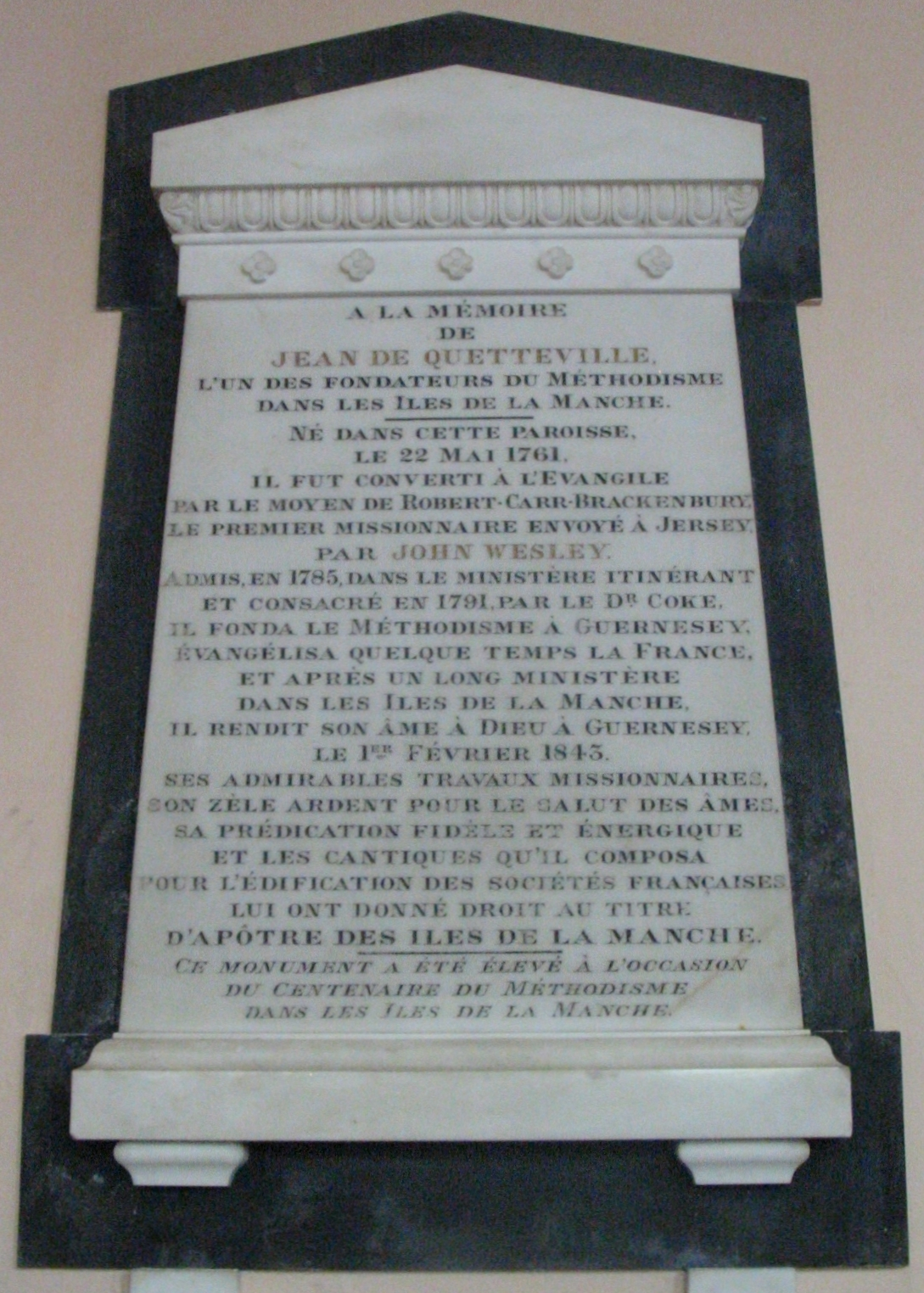
Jean de Quetteville (1761-1843), a Saint Martinais, was converted by the first missionary sent to Jersey by John Wesley. This plaque, erected to commemorate the centenary of Methodism in the Channel Islands, describes him as the "apostle of the Channel Islands"

In 1774 Pierre Le Sueur and Jean Tentin returned to Jersey from Newfoundland and started to preach Methodism to which they had been converted while engaged in the Newfoundland fisheries. Some Huguenots were drawn to the ideas of Methodism similar to those of Calvinism.

Conflict with the authorities ensued when men refused to attend Militia drill when that coincided with chapel meetings. The Royal Court attempted to proscribe Methodist meetings, but King George III refused to countenance such interference with liberty of religion. The first Methodist minister in Jersey was appointed in 1783, and John Wesley preached in Jersey in August 1787, his words being interpreted into the vernacular for the benefit of those from the country parishes. The first building constructed specifically for Methodist worship was erected in Saint Ouen in 1809.

=== Judaism ===
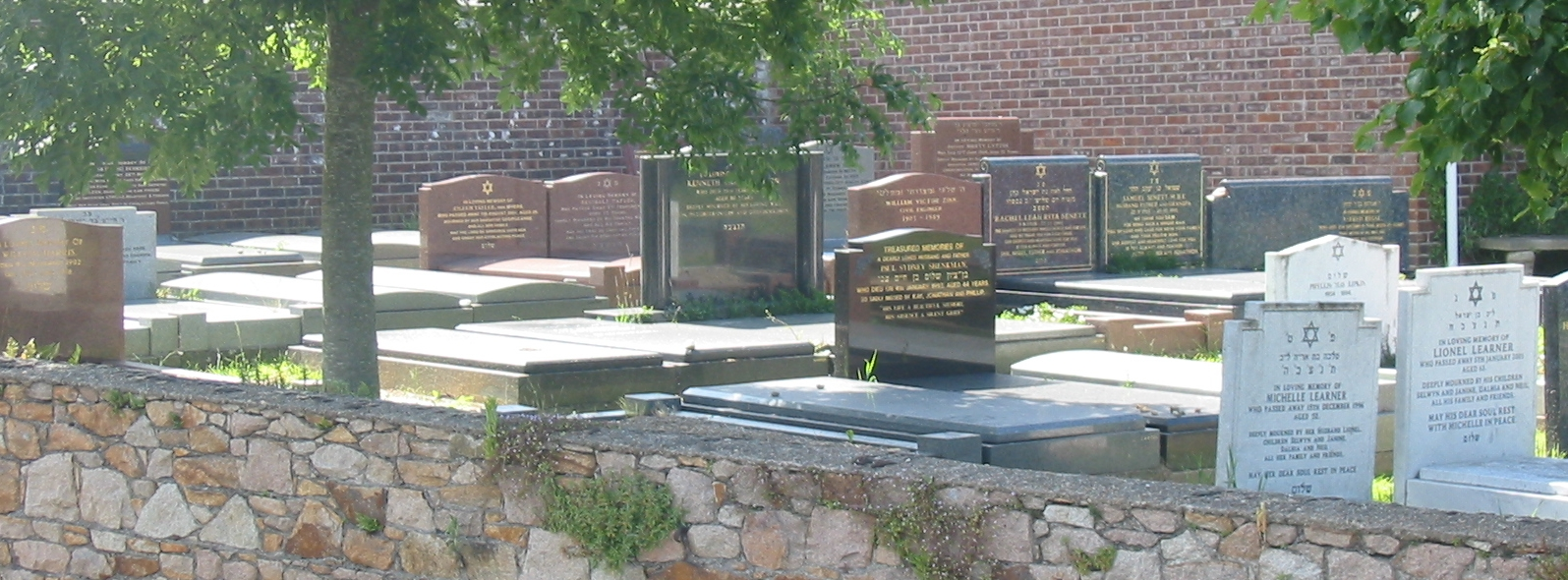
Jewish cemetery in Saint Helier.

Jews first established a synagogue in Saint Helier in 1843.

There were only a small number of foreign and British Jews in Jersey before the start of the Occupation of the Channel Islands in the Second World War. Most of the Jewish population of Jersey evacuated to safety in June 1940 to the United Kingdom, but the United Kingdom did not permit foreign nationals, including Jews, to leave for the United Kingdom, leaving them trapped in Jersey. 12 Jews were registered under the laws imposed by the Germans and administered by the Jersey authorities (a higher number concealed their Jewish identity or were helped to conceal their identity by resisters in the bureaucracy). However, the anti-Jewish repressions were not carried out systematically. Jews of British citizenship were less likely to be persecuted than foreigners. A number of well-known Jews lived through the Occupation in comparative openness, including Marianne Blampied, the wife of Edmund Blampied, the artist. The Bailiff of Jersey refused to ratify the registration of the eighth order requiring the wearing of a yellow star as a "measure too far". No Jersey Jew was required to wear a yellow star on the Island. In 1943 Jews were among those deported to internment camps in Germany, along with UK-born residents, former British military personnel and "undesirables".

After the war, there was a revival of Jewish life in Jersey and a new congregation was founded in Saint Brélade in 1962. As of 2004, Jewish population was estimated at 120.

== State and Church ==
The established church of Jersey tried to reform in the 19th century. This faced some resistance and was led by individuals such as the Rector of Grouville (1851-1885) the Rev. Abraham Le Sueur. Steps taken included abolishing pew ownership. Pew ownership allowed richer families to buy certain pews within the parish church, which was associated with status. Its abolishment made the parish churches more equitable.

== Religion in Jersey today ==
In the 2015 Jersey Annual Social Survey, 54% of adults stated they had a religion, 39% said they did not, and 7% weren't sure. Of those who had a religion and gave details, 97% were Christian and the remaining 3% were Buddhist, Hindu, Jewish, Muslim, or Sikh. Christians broke down as 44% Anglican, 43% Catholic, and the remaining 13% another Christian denomination.

In addition to the Church of England, the island is host to the following faith groups:

- Methodism
- The Catholic Church
- The Greek Orthodox Church
- Baptists
- Plymouth Brethren
- Church of Scotland
- Spiritual Christianity
- Pentecostalism
- Jehovah's Witnesses
- Latter-day Saints
- Evangelicalism
- The Society of Friends (Quakers)
- Presbyterianism
- United Reformed Church
- Members of the Baháʼí Faith
- Judaism
- Islam
- and various Pagans and Wiccans.

== Notable places of worship ==
- Parish Church of St Helier
- Fisherman's Chapel
- Grouville Church
- St Brelade's Church
- St Aubin on the Hill
- St Thomas' Church in St Helier
- Parish Church of St Clement

== See also ==
- Jersey
- Channel Islands
- List of churches, chapels and meeting halls in the Channel Islands

== Bibliography ==
- Balleine's History of Jersey, Marguerite Syvret and Joan Stevens (1998) ISBN 1-86077-065-7
- Jersey in Prehistory, Mark Patton, 1987
- The Channel Islands under Tudor Government, A.J. Eagleston
- Foxe's Book of Martyrs
- Reformation and Society in Guernsey, D.M. Ogier
- International Politics and the Establishment of Presbyterianism in the Channel Islands: The Coutances Connection, C.S.L. Davies
- Religion, History and G.R. Balleine: The Reformation in Jersey, by J. St John Nicolle, The Pilot
- The Reformation in Jersey: The Process of Change over Two centuries, J. St John Nicolle
- A Biographical Dictionary of Jersey, G.R. Balleine
- The Chroniques de Jersey in the light of contemporary documents, BSJ, AJ Eagleston
- The Portrait of Richard Mabon, BSJ, Joan Stevens
