= Marc-Adolphe Guégan =

French journalist and poet

Marc-Adolphe Guégan (1891–1959) was a French journalist and poet who was an early exponent of Japanese haiku in the French language.

He lived on the Île d'Yeu in the Atlantic.

He was a friend of Claude Cahun (née Lucy Schwob) and Suzanne Malherbe (artist name: Marcel Moore), with whom he collaborated on two books.

An exhibition about his life and work was held during July–August 2009 on the île d'Yeu.

== Bibliography ==
- L'Invitation à la fête primitive (1921), with a triptych, "les Trois Epoques", by Marcel Moore – poetry
- Oya-Insula ou l'Enfant à la conque (1923), prints by Marcel Moore – poetry
- Trois petits tours et puis s'en vont (1924) – poetry
- Mystique des tempêtes (1927) – poetry
- Marc-Adolphe Guégan, poète de l'Île d'Yeu (2009) by Jean-François Henry
