= Parish Church of St Clement =

Coordinates: 49.1737°N 2.0566°W

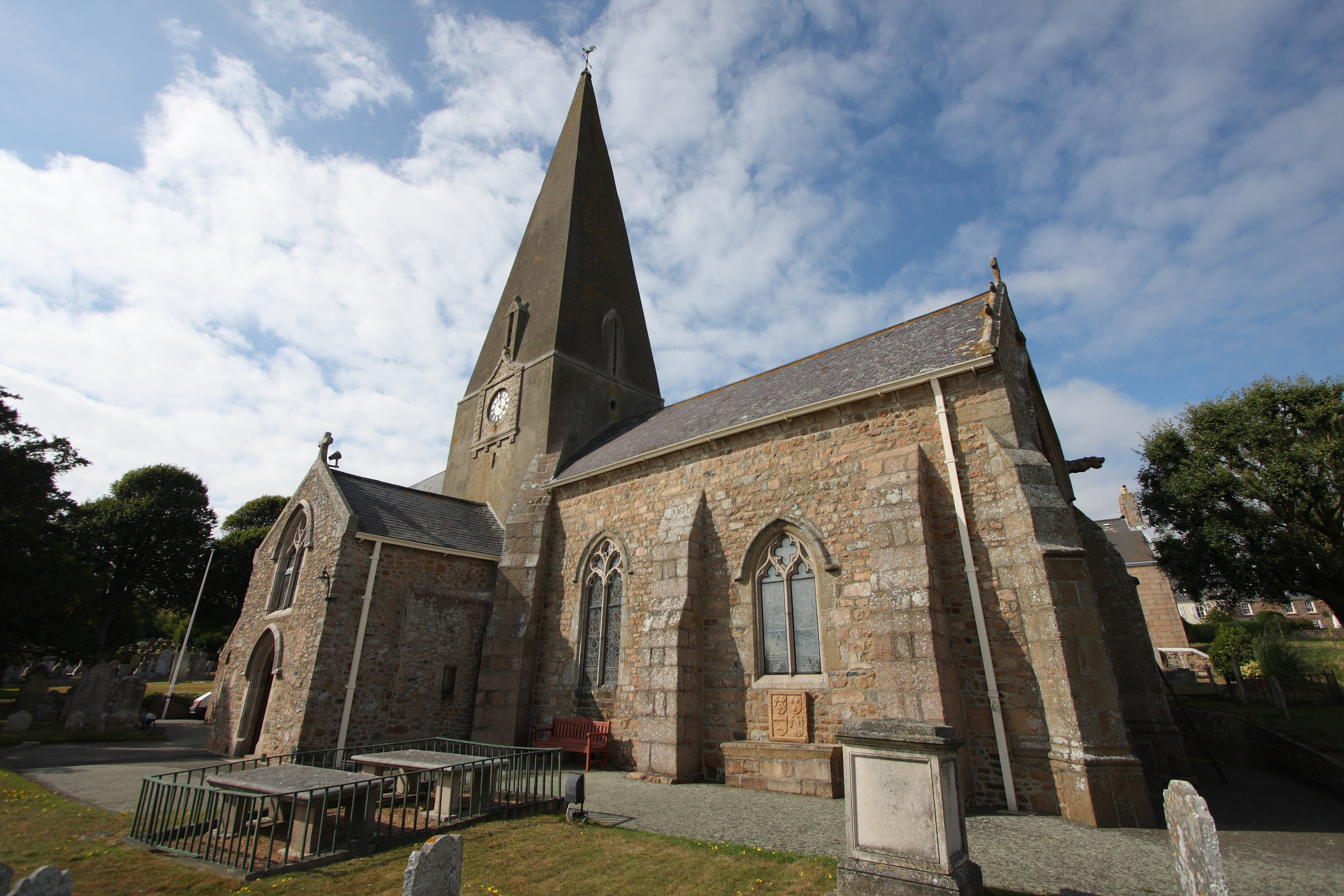

- Location in Jersey
- Location: St Clement, Jersey
- Denomination: Anglican

History
- Dedication: Pope Clement I

Architecture
- Functional status: Active

Specifications
- Materials: Granite

Administration
- Diocese: Winchester
- Parish: Saint Clement

Clergy
- Vicar: Canon David Shaw

The Parish Church of St Clement is the parish church of the parish of Saint Clement in Jersey. It is one of the twelve "Ancient Parish Churches" of Jersey.

In ancient Latin documents the church is referred to as Ecclesia Sancti Clemtentis de Petravilla in Gersuis which translates to "the Church of St. Clement on the estate of Peter in Jersey".

== History ==
The church's origins lie with a privately owned fort which is thought to have been destroyed during the Viking raids. Construction of the stone church began around the year 911, starting with a chapel; now the nave.

=== Establishment of the parish church ===
The church became a parish church no later than 1067, because it is known that Duke William II of Normandy granted half the tithes of the church to Montivilliers Abbey in Upper Normandy. and only parish churches were permitted to collect tithes.

== Buried in the churchyard ==
- Sir James Knott, 1st Baronet
- Cecil Stanley Harrison

== See also ==
- Religion in Jersey
