= Disavowals =

1930 autobiography by Claude Cahun

Disavowals or Cancelled Confessions (French: Aveux non Avenus) is an anti-realist, surrealist autobiography by Claude Cahun. It was created to serve as a critique of the dominant cultural conservatism in France through the subversion of traditional autobiography with the use of illustrated photomontages alongside the artist's own aphorisms in the aftermath of World War I.

== Publication ==
Adrienne Monnier rejected the book after Cahun presented it to her in 1928, after Monnier had recommended they write a confessional. Cahun responded:

"You have told me to write a confession because you know only too well that this is currently the only literary task that might seem to me first and foremost realizable, where I feel at ease, permit myself a direct link, contact with the real world, with the facts."

In May 1930, Cahun succeeded in publication despite Adrienne's rejection with a limited edition of 500 by the anti-Nazi publication house, Éditions Carrefour of Paris the same publisher of Max Ernst's Femme 100 tétes. The two artists were likely aware of each other's work as Ernst's book, too, included photomontage. From the book:

"I, Jewish to the point of using my sins for my salvation, of putting my by-products to work of always surprising myself, my eye hooked over the edge of my own waste-paper bin"

== Context and influence ==
In Cahun's introduction she writes "Until I see everything clearly, I want to hunt myself down, struggle with myself".
