= Marcel Moore =

French illustrator, designer, and photographer (1892–1972)

- Moore by Claude Cahun
- Born: Suzanne Alberte Malherbe; 19 July 1892; Nantes, France
- Died: 19 February 1972 (aged 79); Jersey
- Resting place: St Brelade's Church; 49.1841°N 2.2029°W
- Known for: Illustrator, designer, and photographer
- Movement: Surrealism
- Partner: Claude Cahun

Marcel Moore (born Suzanne Alberte Malherbe, 19 July 1892 – 19 February 1972) was a French illustrator, designer, and photographer. She, along with her romantic and creative partner Claude Cahun, was a surrealist writer and photographer.

== Early life ==
Moore was born Suzanne Alberte Malherbe in Nantes, France on 19 July 1892, and studied at the Fine Arts Academy in Nantes. In 1909, at age seventeen, Malherbe met fifteen-year-old Lucy Schwob and began a lifelong artistic collaboration. Malherbe's widowed mother married Schwob's divorced father in 1917. Curator Tirza True Latimer has theorized that this step-sister relationship not only encouraged the young women's creative collaborations but also facilitated their romantic relationship. Between 1920 and 1937, they lived in Paris, where they became involved with the surrealism movement and contributed to avant-garde theater activities. They took male pseudonyms: Malherbe became Marcel Moore, and Schwob became Claude Cahun. They remained together until Cahun's death in 1954.

== Career ==
In her early twenties Moore worked as a graphic designer, producing ornate illustrations influenced by the japonism trend and the Paris fashion scene of the 1910s. Her modern fashion designs were published in the newspaper Phare de la Loire, owned by the Schwob family. She also collaborated with the poet Marc-Adolphe Guégan, producing illustrations for two of his books: L'Invitation à la fête primitive (1921) and Oya-Insula ou l'Enfant à la conque (1923).

Moore is best known as Claude Cahun's collaborator. Cahun's photographic oeuvre, all but forgotten for a few decades, was rediscovered in the 1980s and interpreted as a predecessor of Cindy Sherman's theatrical self-portraits. However, recent scholarship suggests that Moore was not only a muse but also had an active hand in the creation of some of Cahun's best-known works. In an essay for the 2005–2006 exhibition Acting Out: Claude Cahun and Marcel Moore at the Frye Art Museum in Seattle, curator Tirza True Latimer argues that Cahun's photographs are not so much "self-portraits" as collaborations with Moore. At times, they photographed each other posing alternately in the same tableau. Moore's shadow is visible in some photographs of Cahun, making visible her own role behind the camera.

Moore illustrated Cahun's creative writing on several occasions. For Cahun's 1919 poetry volume Vues et visions, Moore created pen-and-ink illustrations similar to the decorative style of Aubrey Beardsley. Moore was the subject of Cahun's dedication, "I dedicate this puerile prose to you, so that the entire book will belong to you and in this way your designs may redeem my text in our eyes." In 1930 Cahun and Moore published a second book of verses and illustrations called Aveux non avenus, recently translated as Cancelled Confessions. Moore's illustrations for this work consist of collaged images assembled from her many photographs of Cahun, dealing with many of the same themes of identity that can be read in Cahun's own photography and poetry.

== Activism ==
In 1937 Moore and Cahun moved from Paris to the Isle of Jersey, possibly to escape the increasing anti-Semitism and political upheavals leading up to World War II. They remained in Jersey when German troops invaded in 1940. For several years, the two risked their lives by distributing anti-Nazi propaganda to the German soldiers. Moore was fluent in German, and was able to translate the secret notes and messages that she and Cahun composed into German, in hopes of fooling the occupation troops into believing that there was a conspiracy on the island. She was often the one to take the most significant risks, slipping her notes into pockets of German soldiers or leaving them in German staff cars. As historian Jeffrey H. Jackson writes in his definitive study of their wartime resistance Paper Bullets, for Cahun and Moore, "fighting the German occupation of Jersey was the culmination of lifelong patterns of resistance, which had always borne a political edge in the cause of freedom as they carved out their own rebellious way of living in the world together. For them, the political was always deeply personal." Despite having reverted to their original names and introducing themselves as sisters in Jersey, their resistance activities were discovered in 1944, and they were sentenced to death and imprisoned. They were saved by the Liberation of Jersey in 1945, but their home and property had been confiscated and much of their art destroyed by the Germans.

== Later life ==
Claude Cahun's health suffered during her wartime imprisonment; Cahun died in 1954, after which Moore relocated to a smaller home. Moore died by suicide in 1972. She was buried alongside her partner Cahun in St Brelade's Church.

== Legacy ==
In 2018, a street of Paris, close to the rue Notre-Dame-des-Champs where Marcel and Claude lived, took the name of "allée Claude Cahun–Marcel Moore" in the 6th district of the French capital.

Rupert Thomson's 2018 novel, Never Anyone But You, was based on the lives of Moore and Cahun in Paris and Jersey.

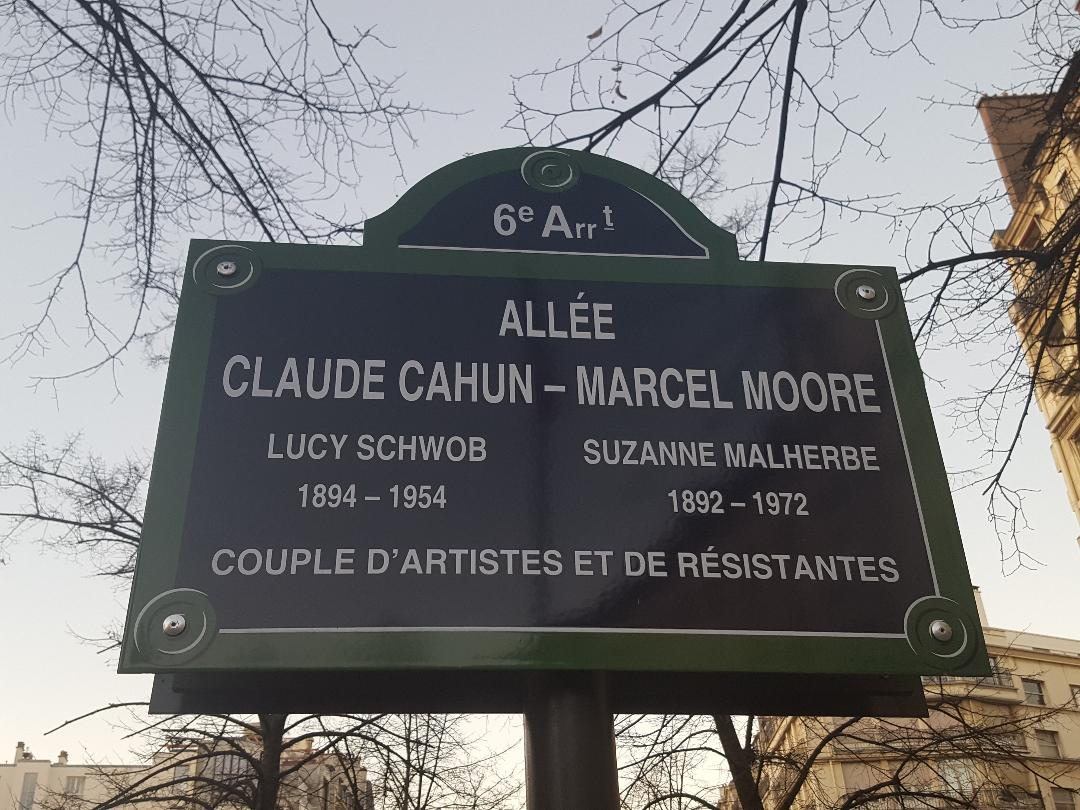
Street sign 'allée Claude Cahun-Marcel Moore' 6th arrondissement of Paris

In 2026, a documentary film examining the shared history, artistic legacy and the relationship between personal and creative partnerships of Claude Cahun and Marcel Moore titled Act 3 was directed by Christine Molloy and Joe Lawlor.

== Bibliography (English) ==
- Jeffrey H. Jackson, Paper Bullets: Two Artists Who Risked Their Lives to Defy the Nazis. New York: Algonquin Books, 2020. ISBN 978-1-61620-916-2
