= Fishermen's Chapel =

Chapel in St Brelade, Jersey

Coordinates: 49.18394°N 2.20275°W

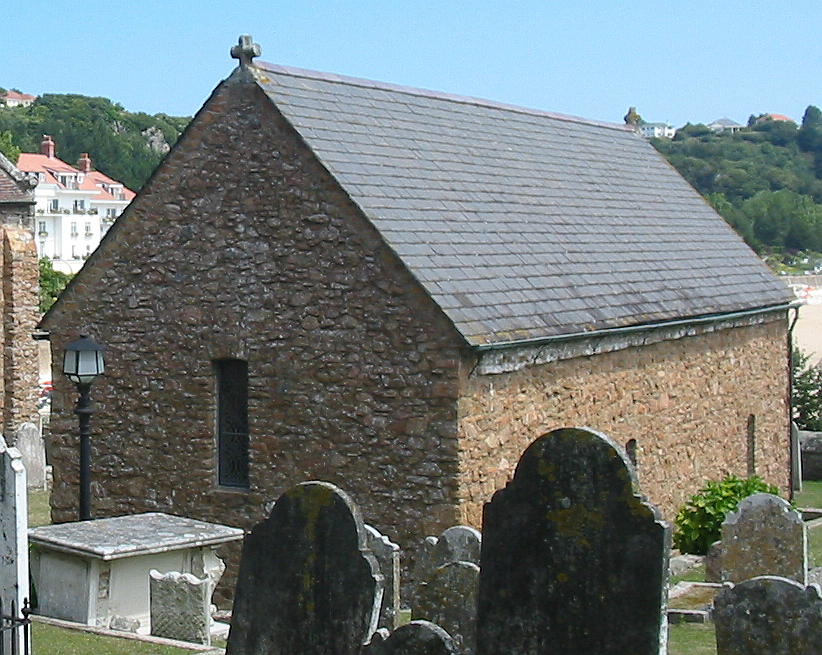
Fishermen's Chapel

The Fishermen's Chapel (French: Chapelle-ès-Pêcheurs, Jèrriais: Chapelle ès Pêtcheurs) is a small chapel located beside St Brelade's Church in St Brelade, Jersey, by the shore at the western end of St Brelade's Bay.

== History ==
Only a few medieval chapels survived the destruction of over fifty others at the hands of the Reformers in the 16th century. This is one of the few remaining with the exception of some Manorial Chapels, and those at La Hougue Bie.

The name of the chapel is the Chapelle-ès-Pêcheurs, and it was originally thought to be associated with the fishing guilds said to have existed in the Island. More convincingly, Warwick Rodwell has suggested that "pêcheurs" (fishermen) is a corruption of " pécheurs" (sinners); this agrees with his archaeological investigations which show the chapel to have been a "chantry chapel", i.e. a chapel funded by a local family to say masses for the souls of the dead. There is no evidence of "fishing guilds".

The walls of this ancient chapel are reputed to date from the middle of the 6th century; some authorities give a later date.

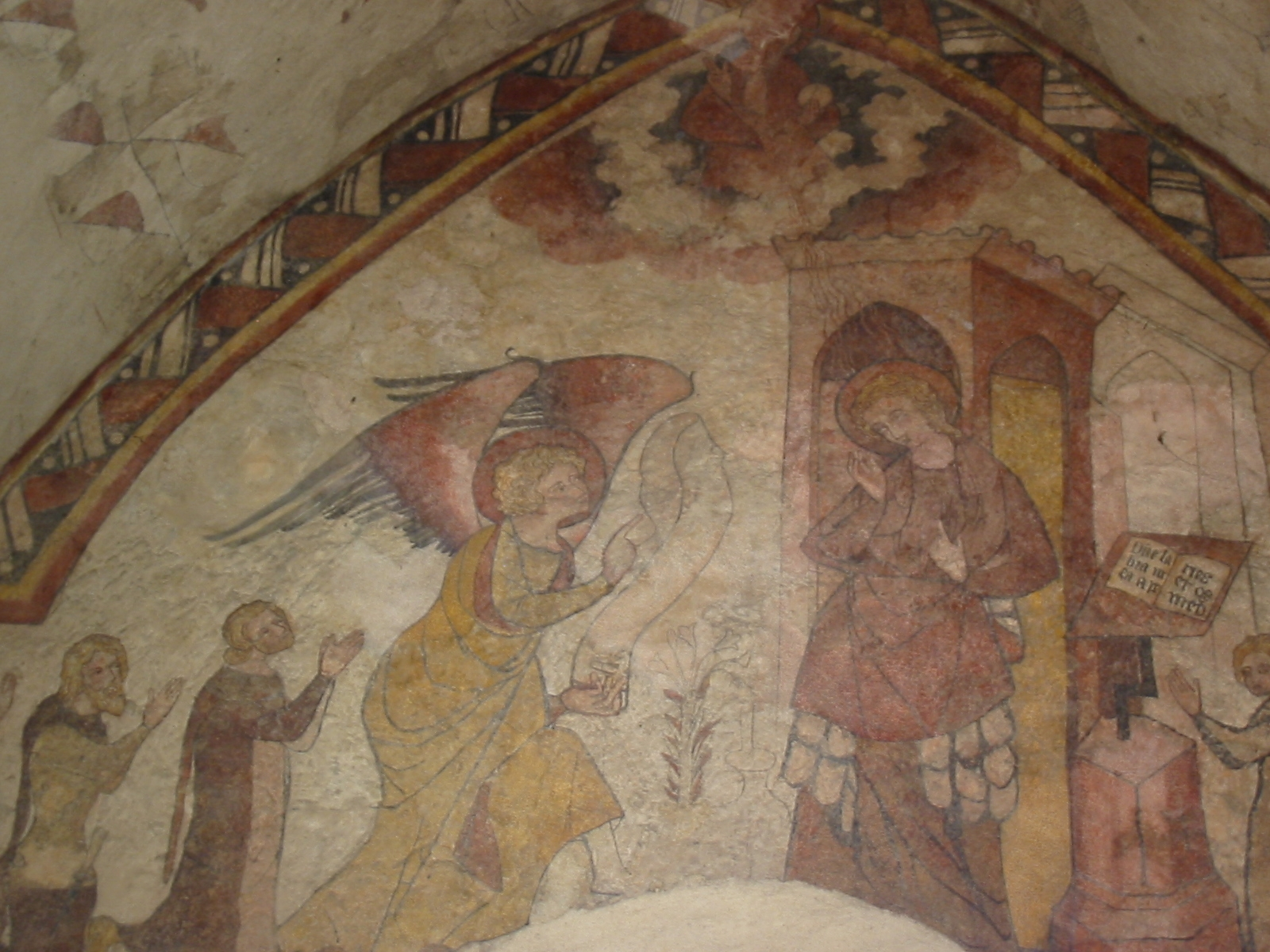
Annunciation in the Fisherman's Chapel

The archaeological work done by Warwick Rodwell place the date of the chapel well after the construction of the main Parish church; because it is smaller, and has no later architectural accretions, it has a more ancient appearance, but this is in fact superficial. However, Rodwell suggests that a primitive wooden structure may have existed on this site as the first "St Brelade's Church"; this was replaced by the core of the present church in stone, with a site better suited for expansion, the first being used for worship while the second was being built. The wooden structure was then rebuilt as a secondary focus of worship, and later taken over as a Chantry chapel.

The material used in the building is the same as was used in the Parish Church: limpet shells crushed and dissolved with boiling sea-water. The mode of procedure was as follows : they first erected their walling, cased the same on all sides, and then poured the liquid lime-mortar into the wall-work.

The stone roof was raised in the 14th century. The clergy of that period evidently found the roof too low and squat for wall paintings. These were discovered in 1918. After a severe storm, colour was revealed on the ceiling and a picture of the "Assumption" was seen, but in a damaged condition. But underneath the plaster was found another painting, 'The Annunciation", of about 1310–1315 A.D. At the foot of this painting are seen fourteen figures, supposedly members of an old Jersey family, the head of which had paid for this painting.

The floor was restored to its earlier level in the 1980s to the Mediaeval level, and the "low, squat" aspect of the chapel which appears in early photographs is now gone, as the proper proportions can be seen.

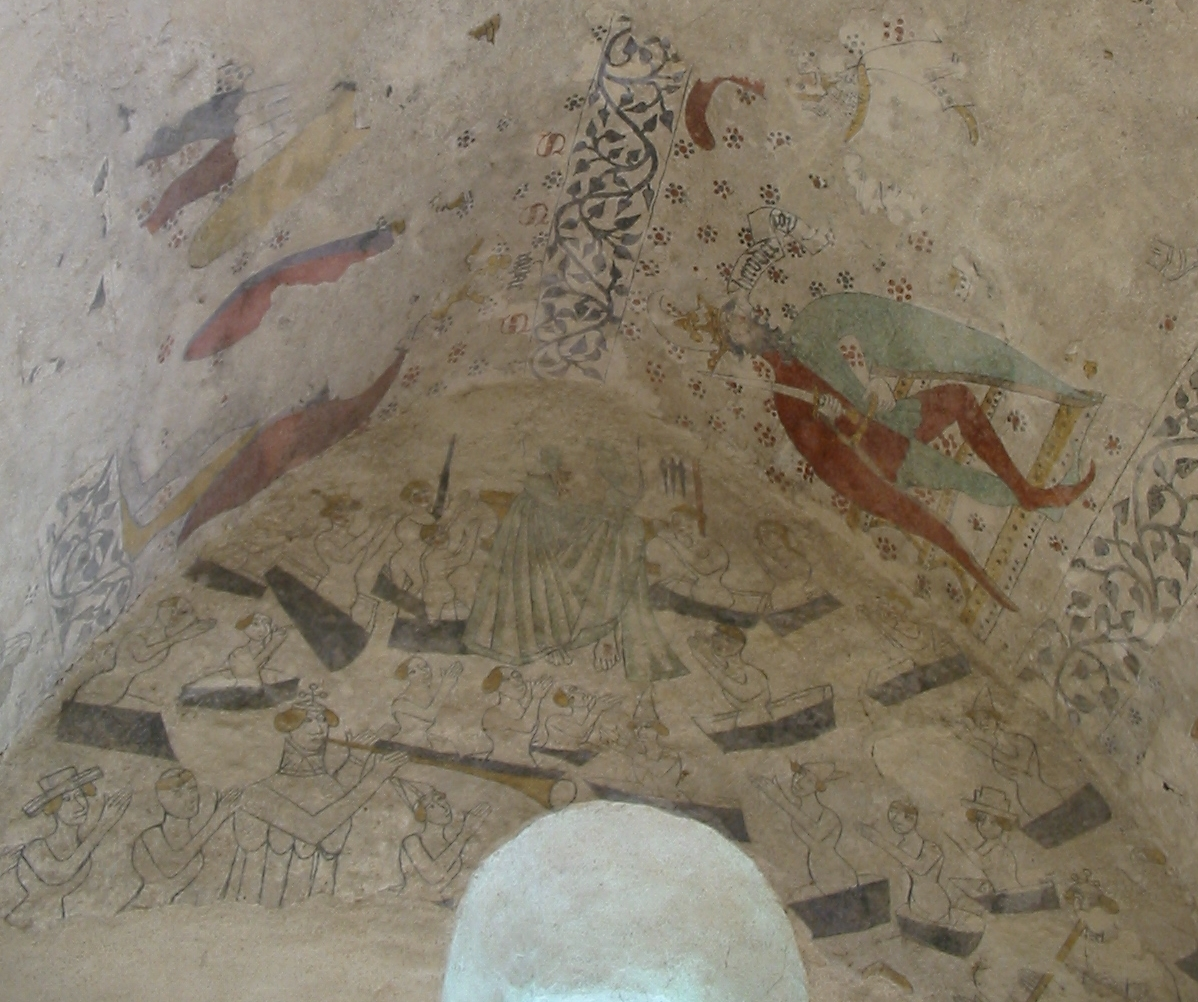
Resurrection in the Fisherman's Chapel

Part of another picture of the Annunciation is to be seen on the south wall behind the arch. A short distance westwards is to be seen the Blessed Virgin's hand clasped on a book resting on a Lectern. Nearby is seen the head of one of the Magi, with the name " Melchior " above it, and close by another of the Wise Men bearing the inscription "les Mages". Between the Wise Men, the body and legs of a chain-mailed soldier is quite distinct.

On the west wall the subject is the "Resurrection " and the "Last Judgement". Over the north door is a picture of Herodes Roy—King Herod; close by is another: "The Scourging of Christ". On the North ceiling over the door is a picture of our Lord "Riding upon an Ass"; close by is a picture of a Roman soldier. On the south ceiling in the little Chancel, portions of Adam and Eve and the children are to be seen.

Early histories of the Parish Church of St Brelade made a mistaken identification with Saint Brendan which is undoubtedly wrong. Saint Brelade was also known as Saint Branwalader, and has no connection with St Brendan. However, as a result of this the stained glass windows in the Fisherman's Chapel portray scenes from the life of Saint Brendan.

== Bibliography ==
- The Fisherman's Chapel, J.A. Balleine
- The Fisherman's Chapel: A short guide, Rev. W. Tabb
- The Fishermen's Chapel, Warwick Rodwell, 1990, ISBN 0901897191
- The Bailiwick of Jersey, G.R. Balleine
- Balleine's History of Jersey
- The Bulletin of the Société Jersiaise
- Jersey Churches by Paul Harrison
- Channel Island Churches, McCormack
