= François Leperlier =

François Leperlier (born 1949) is a French writer, essayist, poet, philosopher and art historian, known especially for his work on the surrealist writer and photographer Claude Cahun.

Leperlier has dedicated a large part of his life's work to the rehabilitation and recognition of Cahun's creative works, having rediscovered her nearly 40 years after her 1954 death, including writing about Cahun's work in his autobiography and editing a collection of her writings. He contributed to many edited volumes, journals, exhibition catalogs, conference proceedings, and participated in radio broadcasts (France Culture).

== Bibliography ==
- Claude Cahun, Aveux non avenus (Fayard, 2011)
- Claude Cahun, L'Exotisme Intérieur (Fayard, 2006)
- Héroïnes by Claude Cahun (editor) (Mille et une nuits, 2006)
- Claude Cahun, Ecrits (editor) (Jean Michel Place, 2002)
- Claude Cahun (introduction) (1999)
- Mise En Scene (contributor) (1996)
- Contre temps (author) (Paul Vermont, 1978)
