= Claude Cahun =

French artist (1894–1954)

- Born: Lucy Renée Mathilde Schwob; 25 October 1894; Nantes, France
- Died: 8 December 1954 (aged 60); Saint Helier, Jersey
- Resting place: St Brelade's Church; 49.1841°N 2.2029°W
- Known for: Photography, writing, sculpture, collage
- Movement: Surrealism
- Partner: Marcel Moore (1909–1954)

Claude Cahun (French: [klod kaœ̃]; born Lucy Renée Mathilde Schwob; 25 October 1894 – 8 December 1954) was a French surrealist photographer, sculptor, and writer.

Schwob adopted the pseudonym Claude Cahun in 1914. From 1920 onwards she began to appear publicly under this name. Best known as a writer and self-portraitist, Cahun explored identity through a variety of performative personae. Her photographic work is characterised by self‑stagings, light reflections and shadows. The artist saw herself as a master of transformation and used photography to record her metamorphoses. Her androgynous appearance and artistic practice defied the strict gender roles of her time.

Cahun's exploration of gender also extended to her writing. She typically referred to herself using grammatically feminine words but occasionally intermingled other grammatical genders. In what is generally considered to be her masterpiece, the experimental autobiography Aveux non avenus (1930), Cahun writes: "Masculine? Feminine? It depends on the situation. Neuter is the only gender that always suits me."

During World War II, Cahun and lifelong partner Marcel Moore launched a two-person resistance campaign against the Nazis who had occupied Jersey. For this they would be sentenced to death (saved at the last minute by the Armistice). They were also active in the leftist group Contre Attaque, a union of communist writers, artists and workers, alongside André Breton.

== Early life ==
Cahun was born in Nantes in 1894, into a well-off literary family. Her mother, Mary-Antoinette Courbebaisse, was Catholic, her father, Maurice Schwob was Jewish. Cahun would later embrace her Jewish identity, adopting her paternal grandmother, Mathilde Cahun's surname. Avant-garde writer Marcel Schwob was her uncle and Orientalist David Léon Cahun was her great-uncle. When Cahun was four years old, her mother, Mary-Antoinette Courbebaisse, began suffering from mental illness, which ultimately led to her mother's permanent internment at a psychiatric facility. In her mother's absence, Cahun was brought up by her grandmother, Mathilde.

Cahun attended a private school (Parsons Mead School) in Surrey after experiences with antisemitism at high school in Nantes. She attended the University of Paris, Sorbonne. She began making photographic self-portraits as early as 1912 (aged 18), and continued taking images of herself throughout the 1930s.

Around 1914, she changed her name to Claude Cahun, after having previously used the names Claude Courlis (after the curlew) and Daniel Douglas (after Lord Alfred Douglas). During the early 1920s, she settled in Paris with lifelong partner Suzanne Malherbe, who adopted the pseudonym Marcel Moore. The two became step-sisters in 1917 after Cahun's divorced father and Moore's widowed mother married, eight years after Cahun and Moore's artistic and romantic partnership began. For the rest of their lives together, Cahun and Moore collaborated on various written works, sculptures, photomontages and collages. The two published articles and novels, notably in the periodical Mercure de France, and befriended Henri Michaux, Pierre Morhange, and Robert Desnos.

Around 1922 Cahun and Moore began holding artists' salons at their home. Among the regulars who would attend were artists Henri Michaux and André Breton and literary entrepreneurs Sylvia Beach and Adrienne Monnier.

== Work ==
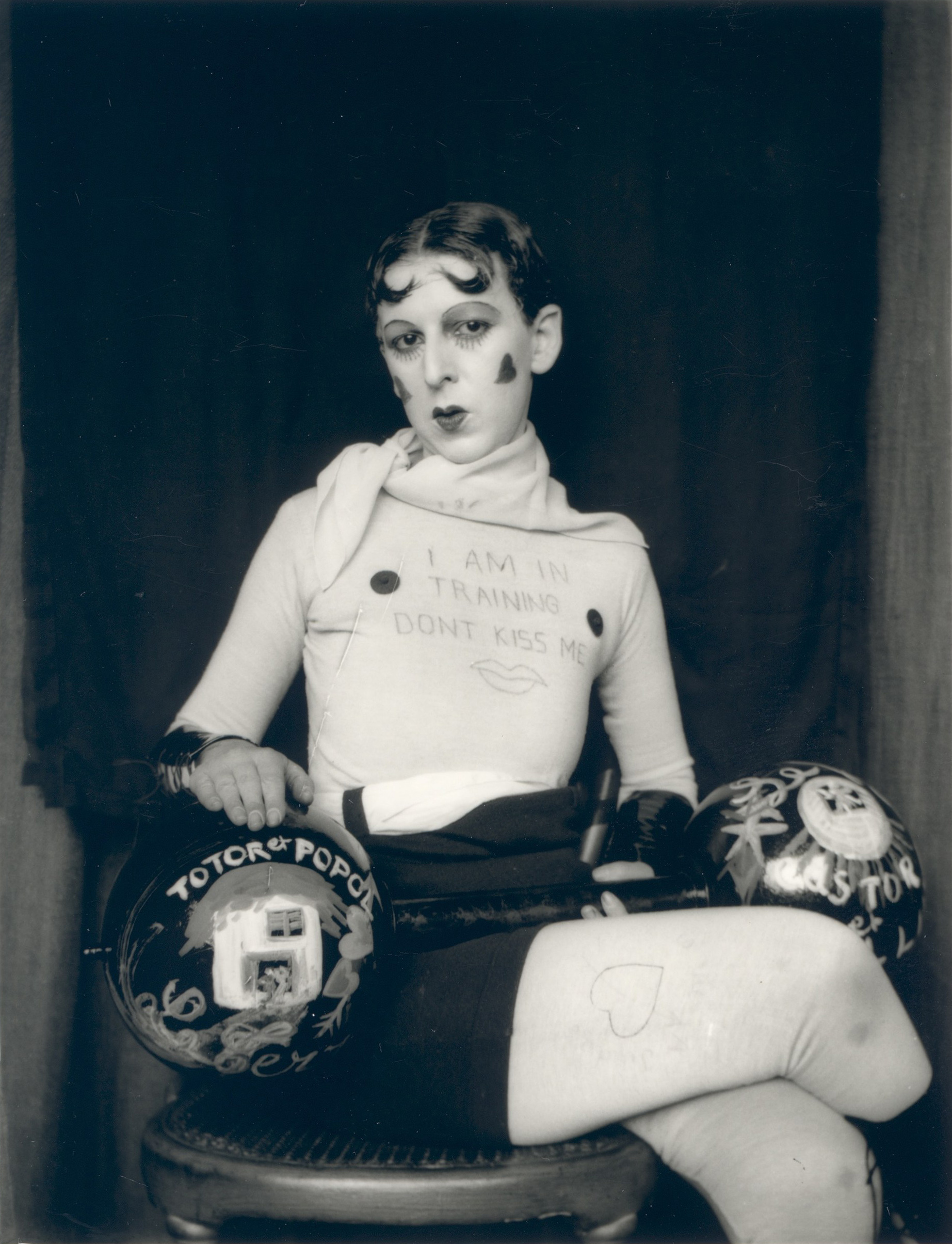
Self-portrait of Cahun wearing a shirt that says "I AM IN TRAINING DON'T KISS ME"

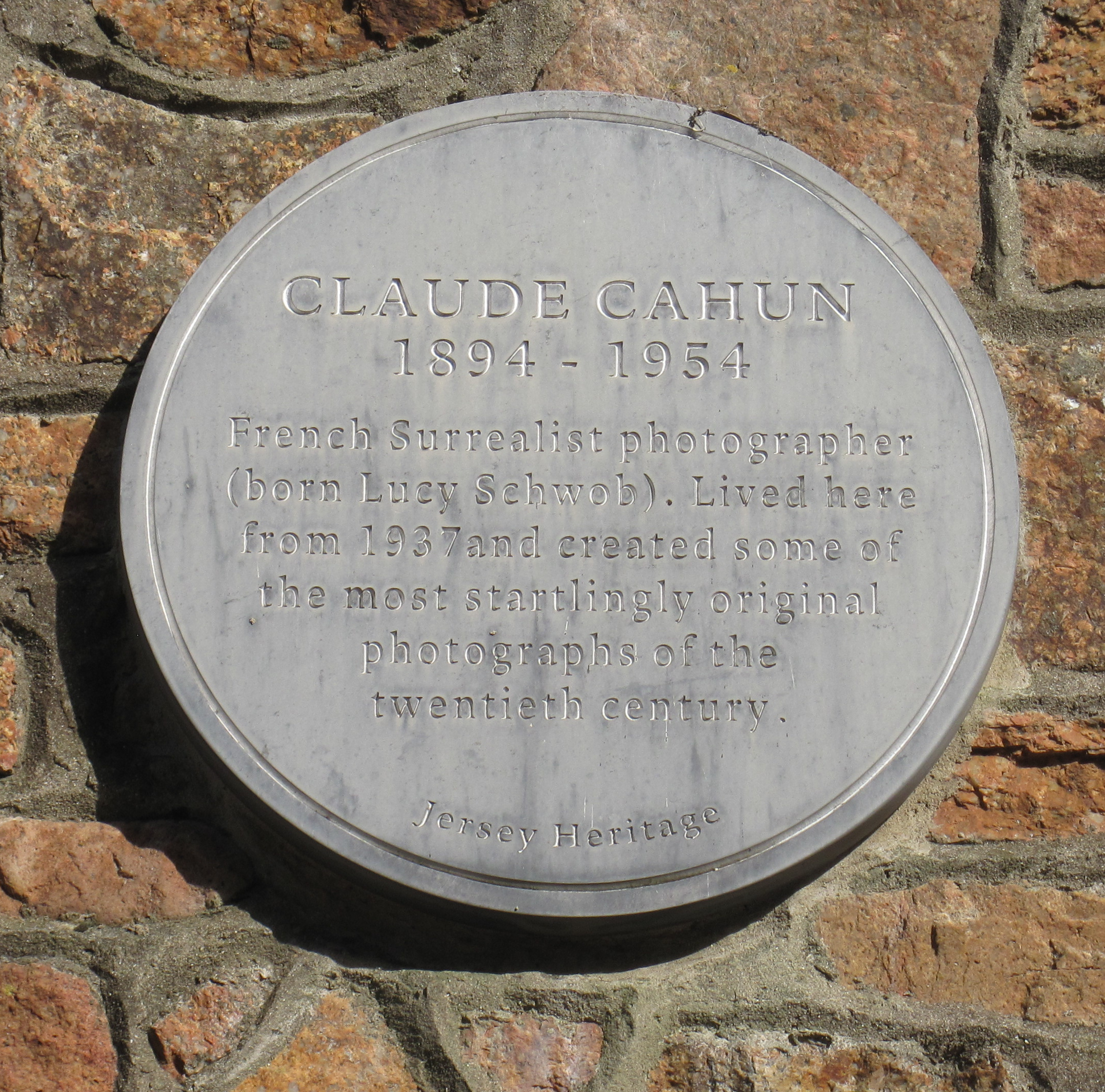
This plaque on Cahun's house in Saint Brélade, Jersey, celebrates her photographic innovation.

Cahun's works encompassed writing, photography, sculpture and theatre, much of it in collaboration with Marcel Moore.

In the 1980s Cahun and Moore's highly staged 'self-portraits' (of Cahun) and tableaux that incorporated the visual aesthetics of Surrealism began to be discovered by a new audience.

Interest in her writing would be slower; her masterpiece Aveux non avenus (first published in 1930 by Carrefour) was not republished in French until 1992 and would not be translated into English (as Disavowals) until 2008 for Tate Publishing. Susan de Muth revised her translation as Cancelled Confessions in 2024 for a new publication with Thin Man Press.

During the 1920s, Cahun produced numerous self-portraits in various guises such as aviator, dandy, doll, bodybuilder, vamp and vampire, angel, and Japanese puppet.

Cahun gave a unique perspective within surrealism, using mirrors, collages and doubling in her photos to reflect the diversion from social norms.

Some of Cahun's portraits feature the artist looking directly at the viewer, head shaven, often revealing only head and shoulders (eliminating body from the view), and a blurring of gender indicators and behaviors which serve to undermine the male gaze. Scholar Miranda Welby-Everard has written about the importance of theatre, performance, and costume that underlies Cahun's work, suggesting how this may have informed the artist's varying gender presentations.

Cahun's published writings include "Heroines", (1925) a series of monologues based upon famous female characters from fairy tales, mythology and the Bible which draw witty comparisons with the contemporary image of women; Aveux non avenus, (Carrefour, 1930), widely considered to be Cahun's masterpiece is a highly original collection of written fragments, including stories, dreams, adventures, jokes, dramatic dialogues and apparent agonies of soul-searching which she delights in finally undermining with an ironic aside ('I am so good at lying!'). The book is illustrated by ten photomontages made in collaboration with Marcel Moore. Cahun also wrote many articles and essays for magazines and journals.

In 1932, Cahun joined the Association des Écrivains et Artistes Révolutionnaires, where she met André Breton and René Crevel. Following this, Cahun began associating with the surrealist group and later participated in a number of surrealist exhibitions, including the London International Surrealist Exhibition (New Burlington Gallery) and Exposition surréaliste d'Objets (Charles Ratton Gallery, Paris), both in 1936. Cahun's photograph from the London exhibition of Sheila Legge standing in the middle of Trafalgar Square, her head obscured by a flower arrangement and pigeons perching on her outstretched arms, appeared in numerous newspapers and was later reproduced in a number of books. In 1934, Cahun published a short polemic essay, Les Paris sont Ouverts, and in 1935 took part in the founding of the left-wing anti-fascist alliance Contre Attaque, alongside André Breton and Georges Bataille. Breton called Cahun "one of the most curious spirits of our time."

In 1994, the Institute of Contemporary Arts in London held an exhibition of Cahun's photographic self-portraits from 1927 to 1947, alongside the work of two young contemporary British artists, Virginia Nimarkoh and Tacita Dean, entitled Mise en Scène. In the surrealist self-portraits, Cahun represented herself as an androgyne, nymph, model, and soldier.

In 2007, David Bowie created a multi-media exhibition of Cahun's work in the gardens of the General Theological Seminary in New York. It was part of a venue called the Highline Festival, which also included offerings by Air, Laurie Anderson, and Mike Garson. Bowie said of Cahun:

You could call her transgressive or you could call her a cross-dressing Man Ray with surrealist tendencies. I find this work really quite mad, in the nicest way. Outside of France and now the UK she has not had the kind of recognition that, as a founding follower, friend and worker of the original Surrealist movement, she surely deserves.

=== Collaboration with Marcel Moore ===
Cahun's work was often a collaboration with Marcel Moore (the pseudonym of Suzanne Malherbe). They were lovers, with Moore being an integral part of Cahun's creative and playful process, though this often goes unrecognized. It is believed that Moore was often the person standing behind the camera during Cahun's portrait shoots and was an equal partner in Cahun's collages.

With the majority of the photographs attributed to Cahun coming from a personal collection, not one meant for public display, it has been proposed that these personal photographs allowed for Cahun to experiment with gender presentation and the role of the viewer to a greater degree.

== World War II activism ==
In 1937 Cahun and Moore settled in Jersey. Following the fall of France and the German occupation of Jersey and the other Channel Islands, they became active as resistance workers and propagandists. Fervently against war, the two worked extensively in producing anti-German flyers. Many were snippets from English-to-German translations of BBC reports on the Nazis' crimes and insolence, which were pasted together to create rhythmic poems and harsh criticism. They created many of these messages under the German pseudonym Der Soldat Ohne Namen, or The Soldier With No Name, to deceive German soldiers that there was a conspiracy among the occupation troops. The couple then dressed up and attended many German military events in Jersey, strategically placing their pamphlets in soldiers' pockets, on their chairs, and in cigarette boxes for soldiers to find. Additionally, they inconspicuously crumpled up and threw their fliers into cars and windows.

On one occasion, they hung a banner in a local church which read "Jesus is great, but Hitler is greater – because Jesus died for people, but people die for Hitler." As with much of Cahun and Moore's artistic work in Paris, many of their notes also used this same style of dark humour. Cahun and Moore's resistance efforts combined political opposition with artistic methods, using disguise, parody, and dark humour to undermine German authority. In many ways, Cahun's life's work was focused on undermining authority; however, their activism posed a threat to their physical safety. As historian Jeffrey H. Jackson writes in his study of their wartime resistance Paper Bullets, for Cahun and Moore, "fighting the German occupation of Jersey was the culmination of lifelong patterns of resistance, which had always borne a political edge in the cause of freedom as they carved out their own rebellious way of living in the world together. For them, the political was always deeply personal."

In 1944, Cahun and Moore were arrested and sentenced to death, but the sentence was never carried out, as the island was liberated from German occupation in 1945. However, Cahun's health never recovered from her treatment in jail, and she died in 1954. Cahun is buried in St Brelade's Church with partner Moore. At the trial, Cahun said to the German judge (according to the documentary on the Occupation of the Channel Islands, presented by John Nettles) that the Germans would have to shoot her twice, as she was not only a Resister but a Jew. This apparently brought a peal of laughter from the court and is said to have been one reason the execution was not carried out.

== Social critique and legacy ==
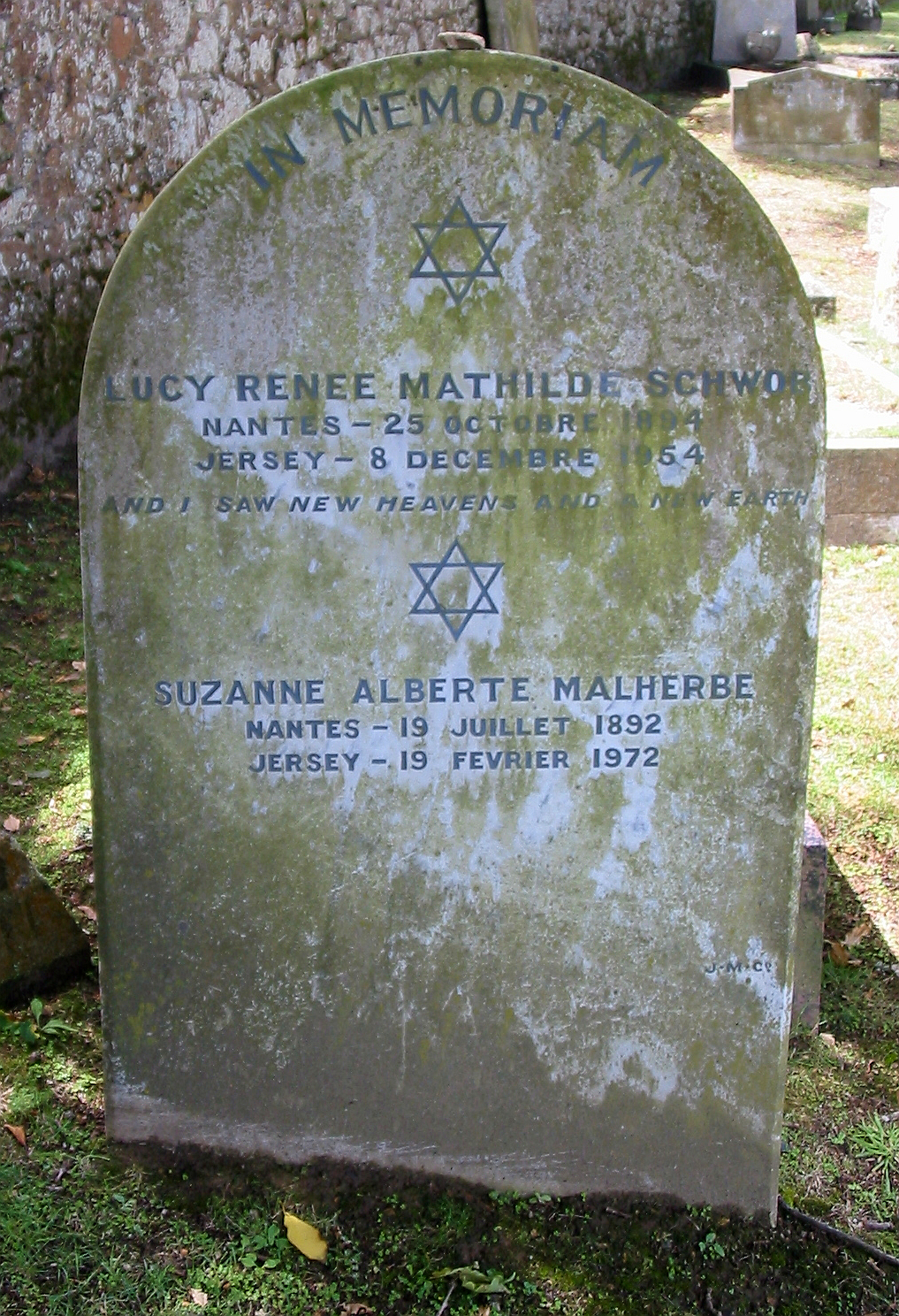
Claude Cahun's gravestone in the cemetery of St. Brelade's Church, Jersey

Cahun made work for herself and did not want to be famous. Cahun's work was largely unrecognized until 40 years after her death. Her work was meant to unsettle the audience's understanding of photography as a documentation of reality. Furthermore, her poetry challenged gender roles of the time and attacked the increasingly modern world's social and economic boundaries. Also, Cahun's participation with the Parisian Surrealist group brought an element of diversity to the group's output which ushered in new representations. Most Surrealist artists were men, whose primary images of women depicted them as isolated symbols of eroticism rather than as the chameleonic, gender non-conforming figure that Cahun presented. Cahun's photographs, writings, and general life as an artistic and political revolutionary continue to influence artists.

Twenty-first century writing on Cahun and Moore's work has described the pair as "prototransgender artists". Christy Wampole connects Cahun's adopted name and appearance to twenty-first century genderqueer identities, arguing that Cahun's photographs display "transgender signals" and are a prototype of modern trans self-representation. Alex Pilcher in A Queer Little History of Art writes "Before the late twentieth century, transgender identities were hardly ever clearly articulated in terms we would recognise today. That does not mean gender variance played any less of a role in queer experience. The queerness of [...] Claude Cahun is beyond debate; whether it is better read through a 'lesbian' lens or a 'trans' one is a question we cannot usefully settle," and later that "Gender that strays beyond the female/male binary is a thread that runs through the artist's life and work." Jordan Reznick, writing in Art Journal Open, goes further, arguing that Cahun embodied a genuine trans non-binary identity, even if the language to name such an identity did not exist at the time.

Cahun's collected writings were published in 2002 as Claude Cahun – Écrits (ISBN 2-85893-616-1), edited by François Leperlier.

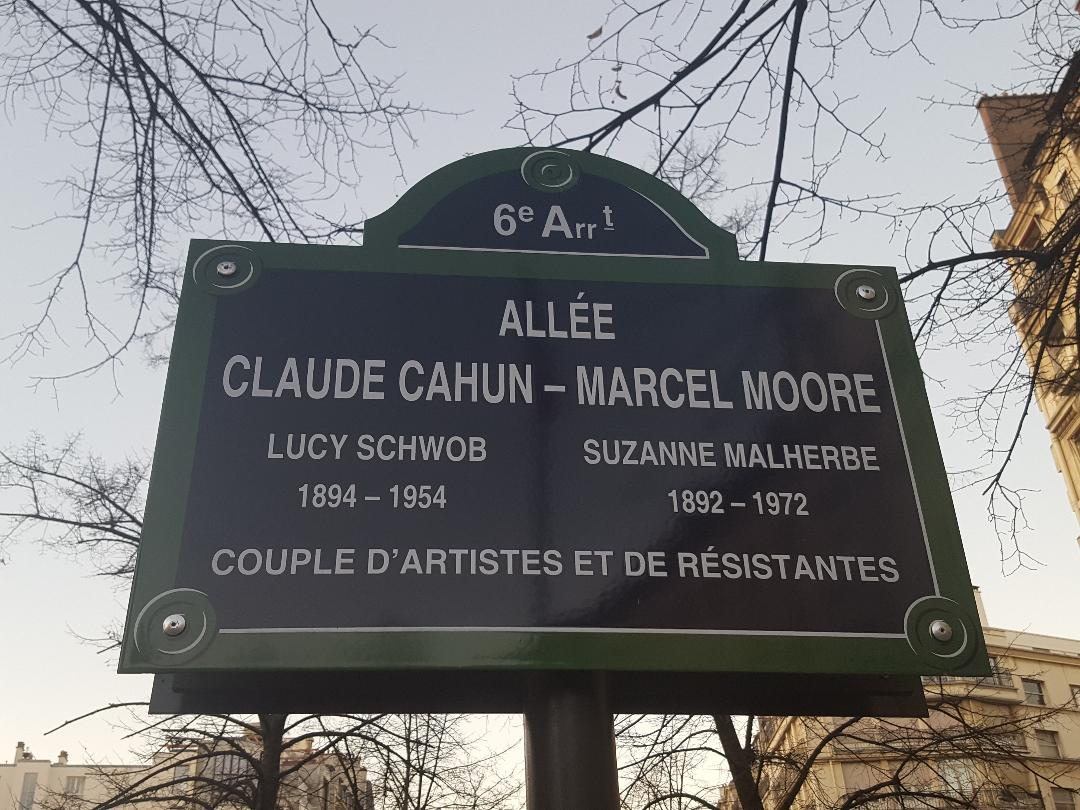
Street sign for allée Claude Cahun–Marcel Moore in the 6th arrondissement of Paris

In 2018, a street of Paris took the name of "Allée Claude Cahun – Marcel Moore" (area of Saint-Germain-des-Prés – Montparnasse, near the rue Notre-Dame-des-Champs where Claude and Suzanne lived).

Rupert Thomson's 2018 novel, Never Anyone But You, was based on the lives of Cahun and Moore in Paris and Jersey. It was favourably reviewed by Adam Mars-Jones in the London Review of Books.

Cahun and Moore's WWII activism and heroism are documented by Jeffrey H. Jackson in the 2020 book, Paper Bullets: Two Artists Who Risked Their Lives to Defy the Nazis.

Google honoured Claude Cahun by showing an animated Doodle on its home page in many countries on 25 October 2021, on the anniversary of what would have been her 127th birthday.

Exist Otherwise is a literary journal edited by Eric Jennings that takes Claude Cahun as its literary inspiration.

Kaz Rowe, an illustrator, published a biography in graphic novel form on Cahun's life in 2023. Liberated: The Radical Art and Life of Claude Cahun explores Cahun's and Moore's involvement in "a radical journey of Surrealist collaboration that would take them from conservative provincial France to the vibrancy of 1920s Paris to the oppression of Nazi-occupied Jersey during World War II, where they used art to undermine the Nazi regime."

An opera about the lives of Cahun and Moore has been commissioned by West Edge Opera with a planned 2027 premiere.

As of 2025, playwright and director John Cameron Mitchell is writing a play about Cahun and Moore.

In 2026, a documentary film examining the shared history, artistic legacy and the relationship between personal and creative partnerships of Claude Cahun and Marcel Moore titled Act 3 was directed by Christine Molloy and Joe Lawlor.

== Bibliography ==
- Vues et Visions (Pseudonym Claude Courlis), Mercure de France, No. 406, 16 May 1914
  - Electronic edition on Bibliothèque Nationale Gallica
- La 'Salomé' d'Oscar Wilde. Le procés Billing et les 47000 pervertis du Livre noir, Mercure de France, No. 481, 1 July 1918
  - Electronic edition on Bibliothèque Nationale Gallica
- Le poteau frontière (Pseudonym Daniel Douglas), La Gerbe, No. 3, December 1918
  - Electronic edition on Bibliothèque Nationale Gallica
- Au plus beau des anges (Pseudonym Daniel Douglas), La Gerbe, No. 3, December 1918
  - Electronic edition on Bibliothèque Nationale Gallica
- Cigarettes (Pseudonym Daniel Douglas), La Gerbe, No. 3, December 1918
  - Electronic edition on Bibliothèque Nationale Gallica
- Aux Amis des livres, La Gerbe, No. 5, February 1919
  - Electronic edition on Bibliothèque Nationale Gallica
- La Sorbonne en robe de fête (Pseudonym Daniel Douglas), La Gerbe, No. 5, February 1919
  - Electronic edition on Bibliothèque Nationale Gallica
- La possession du Monde, par Georges Duhamel, La Gerbe, No. 7, April 1919
  - Electronic edition on Bibliothèque Nationale Gallica
- Les Gerbes (Pseudonym Daniel Douglas), La Gerbe, No. 7, April 1919
  - Electronic edition on Bibliothèque Nationale Gallica
- L'amour aveugle (Pseudonym Daniel Douglas), La Gerbe, No. 12, September 1919
  - Electronic edition on Bibliothèque Nationale Gallica
- La machine magique (Pseudonym Daniel Douglas), La Gerbe, No. 12, September 1919
  - Electronic edition on Bibliothèque Nationale Gallica
- Mathilde Alanic. Les roses refleurissent, Le Phare de la Loire, 29 June 1919
- Le théâtre de mademoiselle, par Mathias Morhardt, Le Phare de la Loire, 20 July 1919
- Vues et Visions, with Illustrations by Marcel Moore, Paris: Georges Crès & Cie, 1919
- Grisaille (Pseudonym Daniel Douglas) and Paraboles (Pseudonym Daniel Douglas), La Gerbe, No. 17, February 1920
  - Electronic edition on Bibliothèque Nationale Gallica
- Une conférence de Georges Duhamel (Pseudonym Daniel Douglas), La Gerbe, No. 19, April 1920
  - Electronic edition on Bibliothèque Nationale Gallica
- Marcel Schwob, La Gerbe, No. 20, May 1920
  - Electronic edition on Bibliothèque Nationale Gallica
- Boxe (Pseudonym Daniel Douglas), La Gerbe, No. 22, July 1920
  - Electronic edition on Bibliothèque Nationale Gallica
- Old Scotch Whisky, La Gerbe, No. 27, December 1920
  - Electronic edition on Bibliothèque Nationale Gallica
- A propos d'une conference and Méditations à la faveur d'un Jazz Band, La Gerbe, No. 27, December 1920
  - Electronic edition on Bibliothèque Nationale Gallica
- Héroïnes: 'Eve la trop crédule', 'Dalila, femme entre les femmes', 'La Sadique Judith', 'Hélène la rebelle', 'Sapho l'incomprise', 'Marguerite, sœur incestueuse', 'Salomé la sceptique', Mercure de France, No. 639, 1 February 1925
  - Electronic edition on Bibliothèque Nationale Gallica
- Héroïnes: 'Sophie la symboliste', 'la Belle', Le Journal littéraire, No. 45, 28 February 1925
- Méditation de Mademoiselle Lucie Schwob, Philosophies, No. 5/6, March 1925
- Récits de rêve, in the special edition Les rêves, Le Disque vert, Third year, Book 4, No. 2, 1925
- Carnaval en chambre, La Ligne de cœur, Book 4, March 1926
- Ephémérides, Mercure de France, No. 685, 1 January 1927
  - Electronic edition on Bibliothèque Nationale Gallica
- Au Diable, Le Plateau, No. 2, May–June 1929
- Ellis, Havelock: La Femme dans la société – I. L'Hygiene sociale, translated by Lucy Schwob, Mercure de France, 1929
- Aveux non avenus, illustrated by Marcel Moore, Paris: Editions du Carrefour, 30 May 1930
  - Review on Bibliothèque Nationale Gallica
- Frontière Humaine, self-portrait, Bifur, No. 5, April 1930
- Protestez (AEAR), Feuille rouge, No. 2, March 1933
- Contre le fascisme Mays aussi contre l'impérialisme francais (AEAR), Feuille rouge, No. 4, May 1933
- Les Paris sont ouvert, Paris: José Corti, May 1934
- Union de lutte des intellectuels révolutionnaires, Contre-Attaque, 7 October 1935
- Prenez garde aux objets domestique, Cahier d'Art I-II, 1936
- Sous le feu des canons francais ... et alliés, Contre-Attaque, March 1936
- Dissolution de Contre-Attaque, L'Œuvre, 24 March 1936
- Exposition surréaliste d'objets, Exhibition at the Charles Ratton Gallery, Paris, 22–29 May 1936. Items listed by Claude Cahun are Un air de famille and Souris valseuses
- Il n'y a pas de liberté pour les ennemis de la liberté, 20 July 1936
- Deharme, Lise: Le Cœur de Pic, 32 illustrated with 20 photos by Claude Cahun, Paris: José Cortis, 1937
- Adhésion à la Fédération Internationale de l'Art Révolutionnaire Indépendant, Clé, No. 1, January 1939
- À bas les lettres de cachets! À bas la terreur grise! (FIARI), June 1939

== Sources ==
- Claude Cahun info page
- Claude Cahun tribute and biography page
- The Daily Beast, 2015-04-21, "Claude Cahun: The Lesbian Surrealist Who Defied the Nazis"
- Feminist Art Archive, University of Washington, 2012, "Claude Cahun"
- Bower, Gavin James. "Claude Cahun: Finding a Lost Great." The Guardian. Guardian News and Media, 14 Feb. 2012. Web. 11 Dec. 2012
- Elkin, Lauren. "Reading Claude Cahun." Quarterly Conversation RSS. Quarterly Conversation RSS, n.d. Web. 11 Dec. 2012
- Gen, Doy. "Meta: Claude Cahun-A Sensual Politics of Photography." Meta-Magazine.com. Mega, n.d. Web. 11 Dec. 201
- The Guerilla Girls. "The 20th Century: Women of Isms." The Guerrilla Girls’ Bedside Companion to the History of Western Art. New York: Penguin Group, 1998. 62–63. Print
- Shaw, Jennifer. Exist Otherwise: The Life and Works of Claude Cahun. United Kingdom: Reaktion Books, May 2017. Print.
- Zachmann, Gayle. The Photographic Intertext: Invisible Adventures in the Work of Claude Cahun. 3rd ed. Vol. 10. N.p.: Taylor and Francis Group, 2006. CrossRef. Web. 11 Dec. 2012.
- Jackson, Jeffrey H., Paper Bullets: Two Artists Who Risked Their Lives to Defy the Nazis. New York: Algonquin Books, 2020. ISBN 978-1616209162 .
