= St Brelade's Church =

Church on Jersey

Coordinates: 49.1841°N 2.2029°W

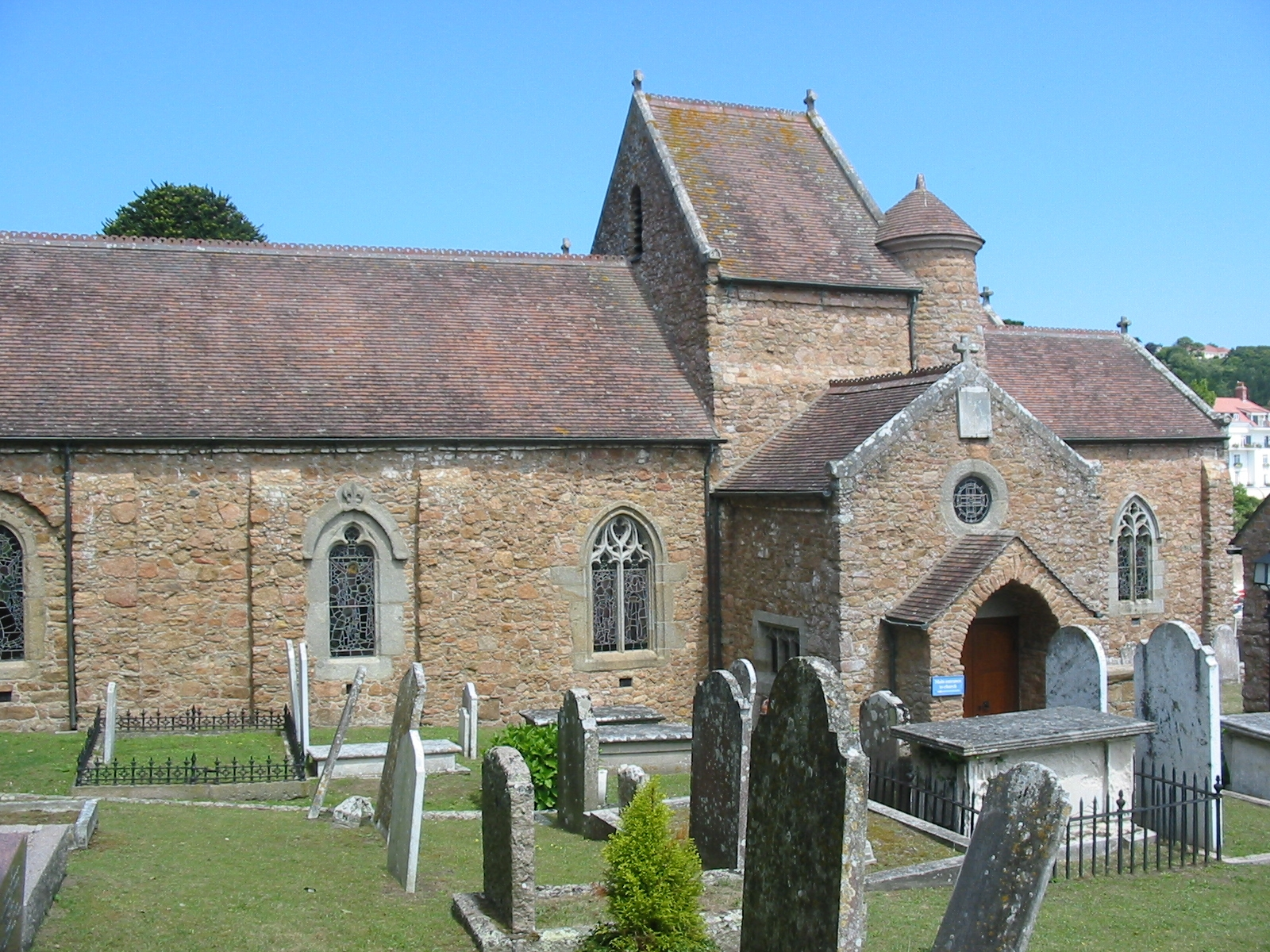
St Brelade's Church

St Brelade's Church is one of the twelve ancient parish churches in the island of Jersey; it is sited on the west side of the island in the parish of St Brelade, in the southwest corner of St Brelade's Bay. It is unique in the Channel Islands in having one of the very few surviving medieval chapels, the Fisherman's Chapel, sited directly next to the main church building.

== Name ==
The church is dedicated to Saint Brelade. St Brelade was also known as St Branwalader, and has no connection with St Brendan.

== History ==
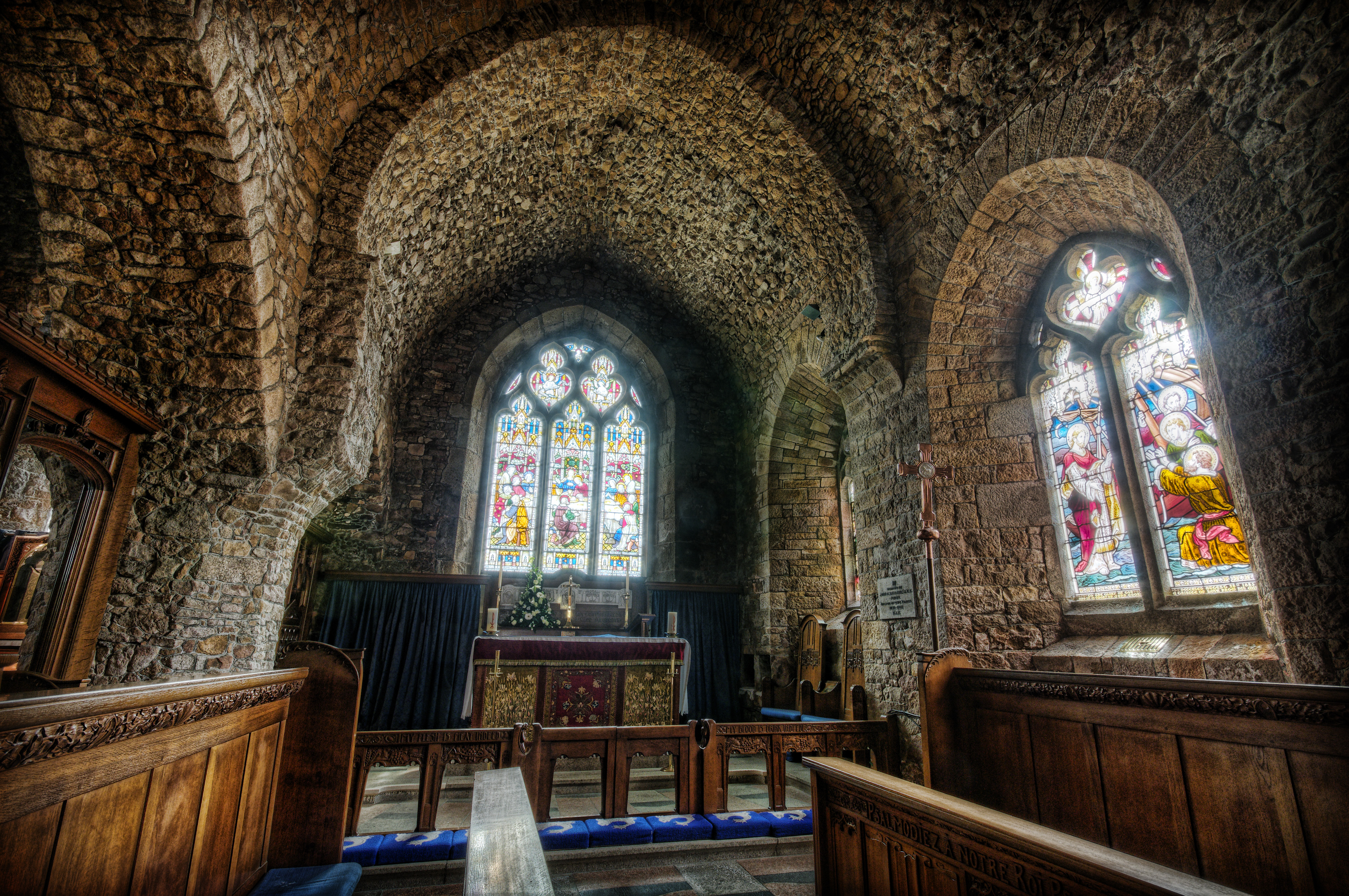
Interior of St Brelade Church, 2013

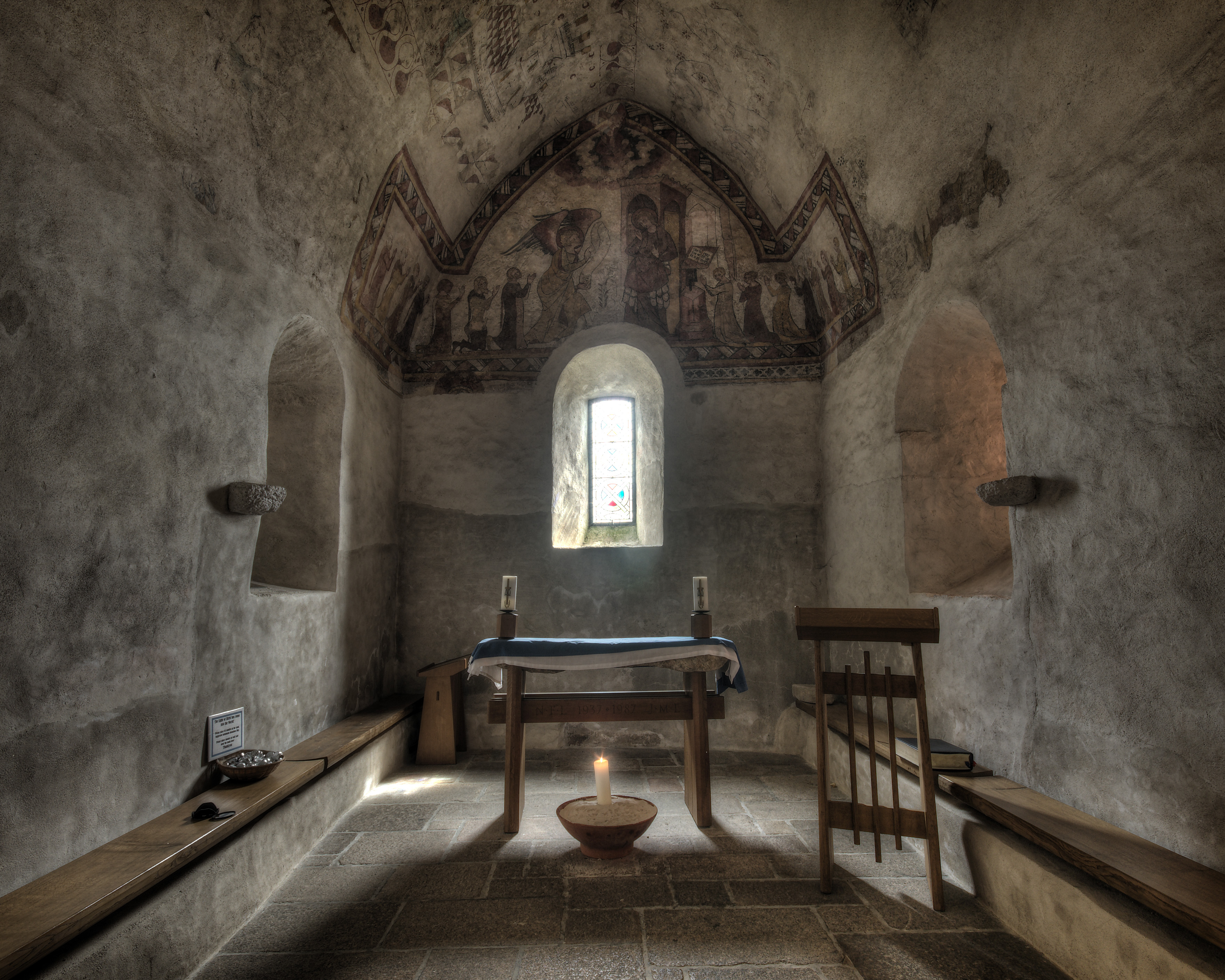
Interior of Fisherman's Chapel

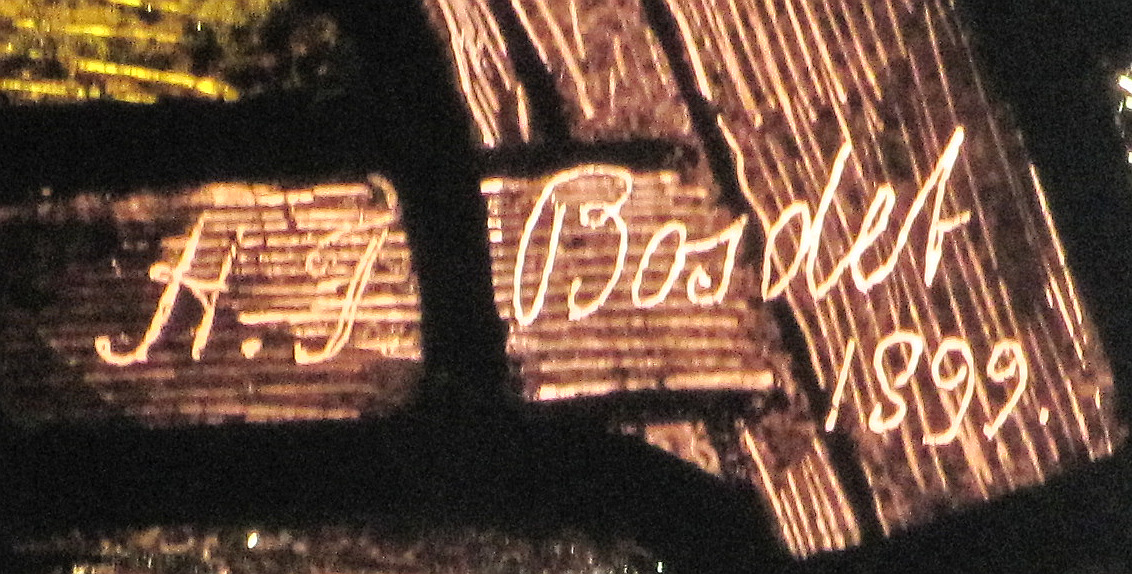
Signature of Henry Thomas Bosdet, 1899

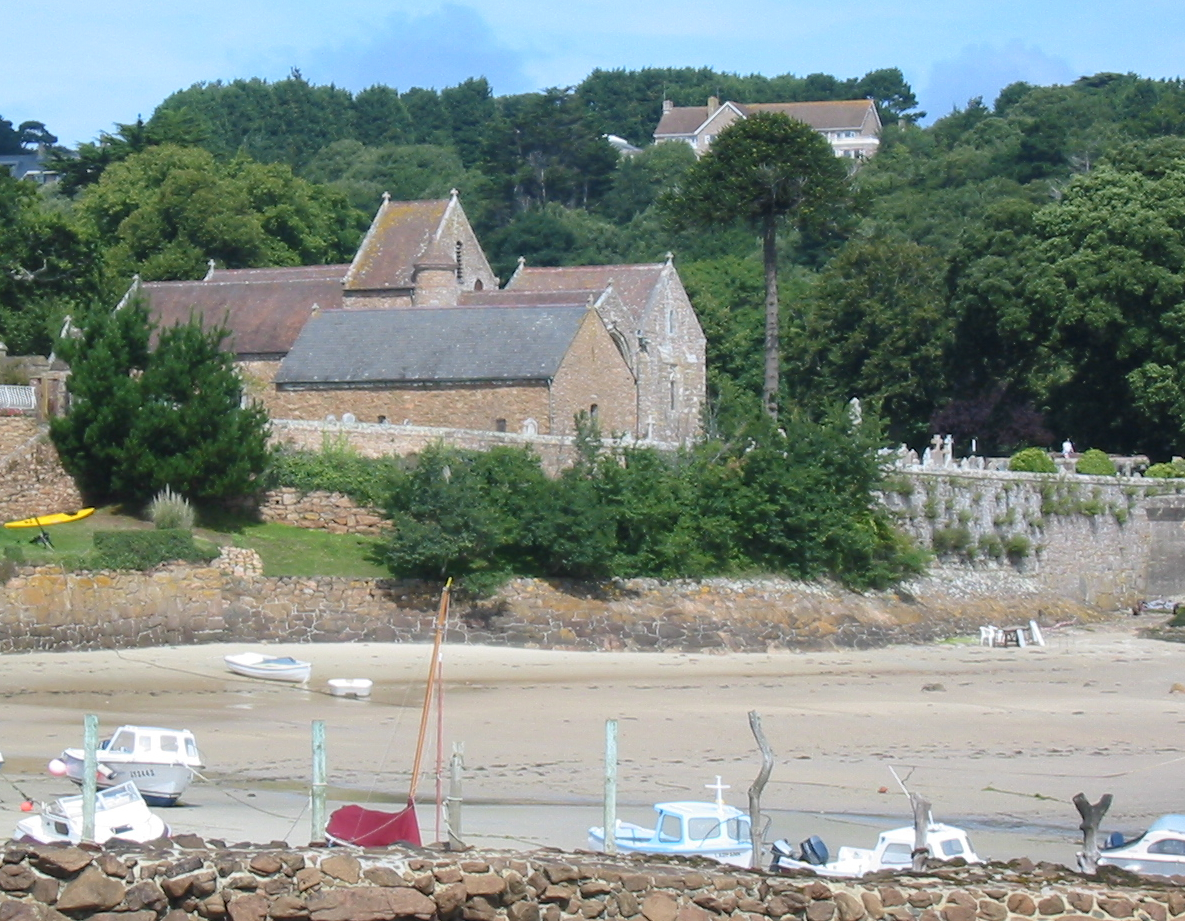
St Brelade, August 2009

The present church is mentioned in deeds of patronage. In AD 1035, Robert of Normandy confirmed the patronage of the church to the monastery of Montivilliers, which shows that the church was here before 1035. The Church was first built by Saint Branwalader. The chancel is the oldest part of the building. The original building extended some six feet into the nave. It was then only a small monastic chapel.

Early in the 12th century it became a parish church, so additions were made; and in the 14th–15th centuries, the roof was raised some two and a half feet higher to a Gothic pitch. The roof of the Fishermen's Chapel was raised at the same time.

The church of the 12th century was cruciform in structure, consisting of a chancel, a nave (built in two periods) and two transepts—the latter forming the two arms. At a later date, perhaps a century later, the chancel aisle was built, and after that the nave aisle.

The tower is of later date than the chancel.

Once a rood screen adorned the church; the corbels on which it rested are still in place and a closed-up doorway, through which the rood was approached, is still in existence.

The font disappeared during the Reformation and was found on the slopes near the church, hidden in bracken and gorse, in 1840 and restored to the church. An ornate wooden cover for the font was provided in memory of H. G. Shepard, long-time churchwarden.

Above the font there was presumed to have existed, up to 1843, a smokers' gallery. However, this supposition, first mentioned by William George Tabb, Rector, has no documentary evidence.

A processional cross dating from the 13th century is to be seen in the Lady Chapel; this was found buried in the church.

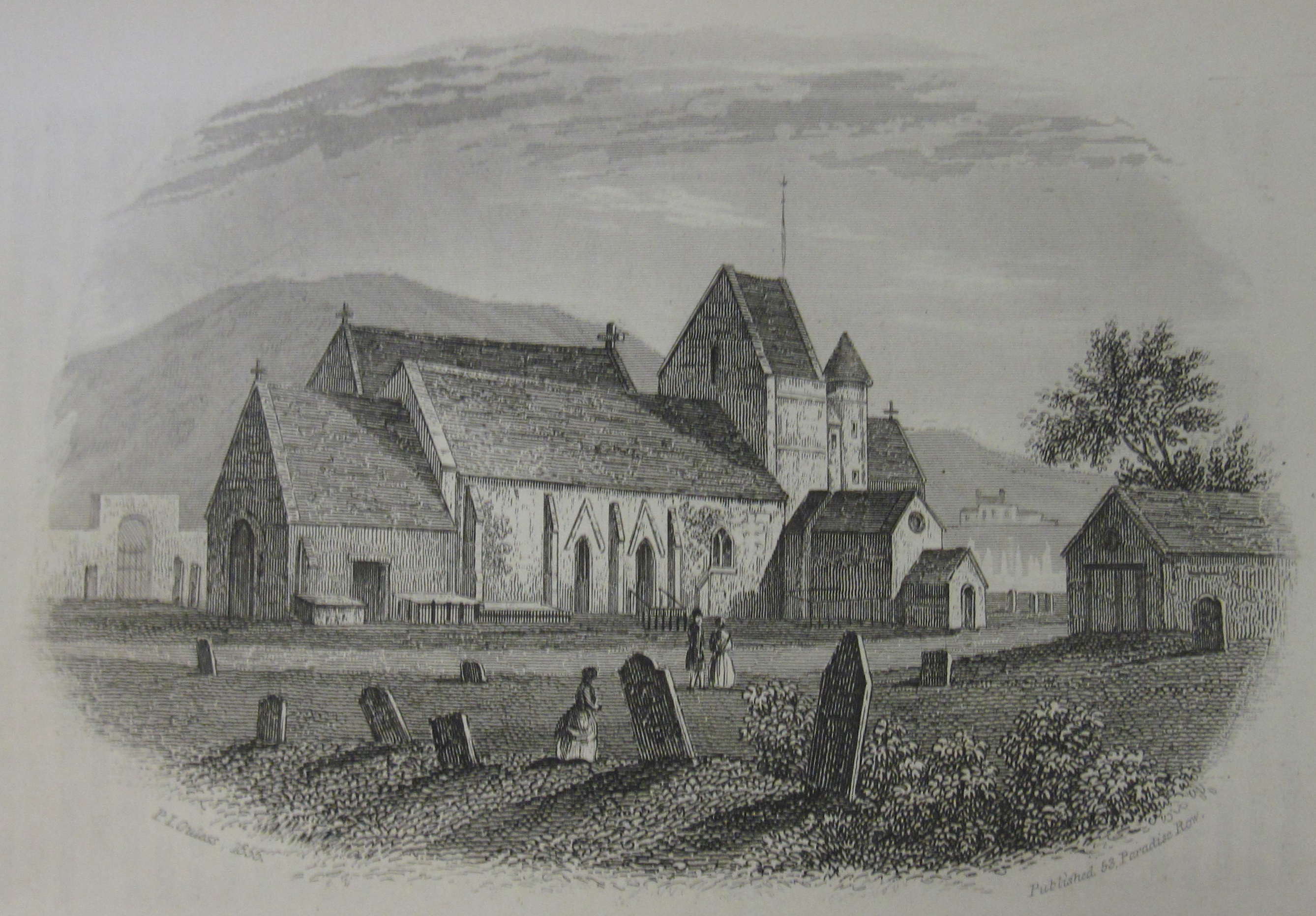
The church by PJ Ouless

Nearly all the stone used in the building of this church came from the beach; limpet shells can be noted on the stonework.

The stained glass is the work of Henry Thomas Bosdet and replaced plain glass windows dating from the Reformation iconoclasm.

The carved text on the pulpit is a rendering of Proverbs 25:11: "Telles que sont les pommes d'or emaillées d'argent, telle est la parole dit comme il faut [A word fitly spoken is like apples of gold in filigree work]."

Before the restoration of Balleine in the 1890s, the whole of the interior stone work was covered in plaster which was whitewashed; the plaster was removed to show the granite, and the whole re-pointed with cement. Balleine's restoration also saw Art Nouveau woodwork in the choir stalls and pulpit and modern paving in the chancel; it is made of five different types of Jersey granite and represents the waves breaking on the seashore.

== Legend ==
The legend has the original site of the church a mile distant and moved by night by fairy folk from their sacred site to where it now stands, until the workmen got the message and left it where it is now. This legend helps to explain the unusual situation of the church and can be traced back to the early 19th century. There are also many English churches which share the same legend.

== List of rectors ==
- 1296 Sire Ranulph Maret
- 1298 Sire Robert de Cumberwell
- 1309 Sire Richard Pestour
- 1348 Sire John de Haselshawe
- 1362-1379 Sire Pierre Payfl
- 1411 Sire Johan Prevost
- 1497-1499 Sire Guillaume Fondan
- 1499-1500 Maitre Guillaume Nicholson
- 1500-1505 Maitre Richard Le Haguais
- 1506-1523 Sire Nicholas Messervy
- 1523-1545 Sire Guillaume Vautier
- 1546-1554 Sire Thomas Bertram
- 1554-1565 Sire Nicholas Alexandra
- 1565-1572 M. Thomas Bertram
- 1572-1574 Maitre John Poulet
- 1574-1576 M. Guillaume Morise
- 1583-1585 M. Marin Chretien dit Bonespoir
- 1585-1601 M. Claude Parent
- 1601-1628 M. David Bandinel
- 1629-1645 M. Pierre Faultrart
- 1647-1651 M. Daniel Boullain
- 1654-1658 M. Pierre Faultrart
- 1658-1692 M. Jean Falle
- 1693-1705 M. Edouard d'Auvergne, M.A.
- 1706-1718 M. Jean Cartault
- 1718-1733 M. Philippe Messervy, B.A.
- 1734-1738 M. Charles Lempriere
- 1739-1743 M. Charles Godfray
- 1743-1772 M. Rodolphe Hue
- 1772-1782 Le Rev: M. Amice Bisson, B.A.
- 1782-1783 Le Rev: M. Edouard Bisson, B.A.
- 1783-1788 Le Rev: M. Philippe de la Garde
- 1788-1818 Le Rev: M. George Bertram, M.A.
- 1818-1829 Le Rev: M. Philippe Fileuil, M.A.
- 1829-1881 Le Rev: M. Edouard Falle, M.A.
- 1882-1892 Le Rev: M. Josue Le Sueur, M.A.
- 1892-1942 Le Rev: M. John Arthur Balleine (Vice Doyen)
- 1946-1971 Le Rev: M. William George Tabb (Vice Doyen)
- 1971-1996 Le Rev: M. Michael Arthur Halliwell. M.A.
- 1997-2001 Le Rev: M. Noel Carter
- 2002-2024 Le Rev: M. Mark Bond
- 2024 La Rev: Revd Dr Sarah Perree McClelland

== William George Tabb ==
William George Tabb was born on 6 October 1897 in Jersey Channel Islands, and baptised in the old Wooden Church at First Tower by the late Rev P. J. Mourant. He was confirmed by Bishop McArthur, Bishop of Southampton, in the original St Andrew's Church on the Esplanade, now a potato store. He was educated at the old Church of England National School under distinguished headmaster. Tom Adderson. Among his Sunday school teachers there were Mr and Mrs A. F. Hunt who for many years were in charge of the Church Bookshop in Waterloo Street.

He wanted to be a priest from an early age and he was much influenced by Mr Mourant, who became Vicar of St Andrew's, and by the organist of the Wooden Church, Harry Jerram. The latter became organist of All Saints and Mr Tabb followed him there and became a member of the choir, a server, a Sunday school teacher and a Lay Reader. There he met his wife, Edith Osment and her family, all of whom were members of the choir.

The outbreak of the First World War brought to an end the 'old days'. Reminiscing, Mr Tabb would say that they were good in parts. It is true that it was necessary to arrive at All Saints for Evensong at 6 p.m. in Order to get a seat in Mr Foster Ward's early days, but it is also true that the country churches, in particular, were largely without heat or light, and they were shut and locked from Sunday to Sunday. When Dean Falle arrived in 1906 and was joined by his curate, the Rev Herbert W Quarrie, they did much to stimulate the new life and energy into the Island Church.

Mr Tabb joined the Royal Navy and he had to grapple with New Testament Greek in a hammock. He saw active service in the North Sea and on Atlantic Convoy Patrols and he was present at the surrender of the German Fleet to Admiral Beatty. After the war he became the last private pupil of the late Ed Le Feuvre, Rector of Grouville - a brilliant coach. He then trained for work overseas at the Brotherhood of St Paul, Essex, supported by good friends at All Saints. Other scholars who had trained there included. Mr Curtis, curate of St Andrew, Prebendary L. Snell, sometime curate of St Helier and Mr Hornby, former rector of St John and St Clement.

From there he went to Canada for ordination in the Diocese of Ottawa, where he married Edith Osment. They were married in Ontario in 1924. The Church records state:

13327-24 William George TABB, 27, clerk in holy orders, Jersey - Channel Islands, Montague Rectory - Montague, s/o Charles Francis TABB & Ada SMITH, married Edith May OSMENT, 27, Jersey - Channel Islands, Rosedale - Montague, d/o Edwin Henry OSMENT & Erith Mary KELLAWAY, with: John SALTER of Montague & Ada Zelie TABB of Rosedale, 18 November 1924 at Smith Falls.

After caring for four churches in the Montague and Franktown areas, and doing intensive missionary work in an area three times the size of Jersey, he became rector of Bearbrook with three Churches to care for. Six years later he returned to England after a severe operation and took a curacy in Dartmouth.

Dean Falle was always on the lookout for young Jerseymen to fill the Parish Cures and he offered Tabb Trinity. War and the Occupation brought great burdens. States work became more difficult. When Canon Cohu was sent to Germany he found himself on the Agriculture Committee in addition to the Public Health Committee under Edward Le Quesne. Apart from these two major committees he served at various times on the original Motor Traffic and Tourism Committees, Electricity, Markets and Westaway Crèche. Tabb's knowledge of French together with his intimate knowledge of Jersey manners and customs, stood him in good stead as Chapter Clerk.

After 10 years there he moved south to St Brelade's Church where he became Rector in 1946. While at Trinity he was able to continue his duties as chaplain to Athelstan Riley but St Brelade's needed his undivided attention. It was a growing parish, had a huge visitor population and Mrs Tabb had a large Rectory to run. He also gave up his work as Chaplain to the General Hospital and H.M. Prison. When he took office in 1946 his flock numbered 2,700. in 1965, the population of the Parish was 9,000.

He was Rector of Trinity Church in Jersey from 1934–1946, and Rector at St Brelade's Church from 1946 to 1971, where he died as incumbent at the age of 74.

Another distinction which he shares with Canon Norman, Rector of St Saviour, is that of being the last Rector still in office who served in the States Chamber of the States of Jersey before Rectors were dismissed by the electorate.

== Buried in the churchyard ==
- Claude Cahun, buried as Lucy Schwob
- George Reginald Balleine
- Gilbert Imlay
- Marcel Moore, buried as Suzanne Malherbe

== Sources ==
- The Pilot, August 1965, the Magazine of the Church of England in Jersey
- The London Gazette, 1945
