= David Bandinel =

Italian-British dean of Jersey

The Very Reverend David Bandinel
- Dean of Jersey
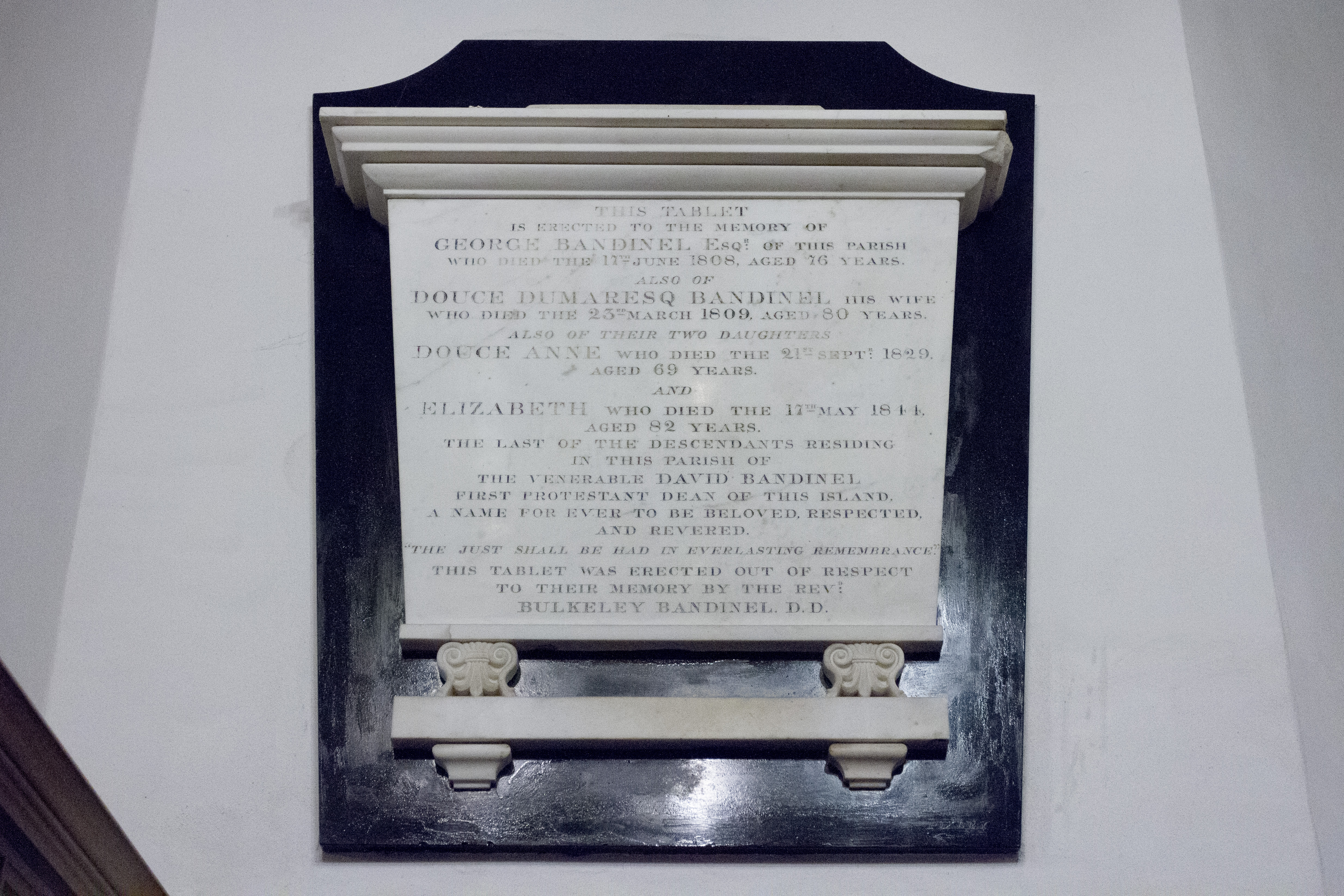
- Church: Church of England
- In office: 1620 to 1645
- Other posts: Rector of St Brelade's Church (1601-1628); Rector of St Mary's Church (1620-1626); Rector of St Martin Le Vieux Church (1629-1645)

Personal details
- Born: David Bandinelli; 1575 Geneva, Switzerland
- Died: 12 February 1644 (aged 68) Mont Orgueil, Saint Martin, Jersey
- Buried: St. Martin Le Vieux Church, Saint Martin, Jersey
- Denomination: Protestantism
- Parents: Girolamo Bandinelli and Katerina
- Spouse: Elizabeth Stallenge (m. 1599)
- Children: Seven

David Bandinel (1575–1645) was the first dean of Jersey following the Reformation.

== Life ==
Bandinel was born in 1575 (sometimes given as 1577), probably in Geneva, Switzerland, of Italian descent. His father was Girolamo Bandinelli who was likely a descendant of the powerful Bandinelli family of Siena. He arrived in England at some point in the 1590s and does not appear to have had any formal education there, but was employed in the house of a "Mr. Verney", almost certainly Richard Verney. After marrying Elizabeth Stallenge on 31 January 1599 in St Olave's Church, Hart Street, London (likely Bandinel's local church at the time), they settled in Saint Brelade, Jersey where he became the rector of St Brelade's Church in 1601. On 2 August 1602, Bandinel was naturalised as a British subject by Sir Walter Raleigh, then Governor of Jersey. Bandinel juggled more than one rector role by becoming rector of St Mary's Church in 1620 for six years, before being appointed to the office of the dean of Jersey, on its revival, by James I, on 15 April 1620—John Paulet being the former dean of the Channel Islands during Queen Mary's reign. He later became rector of St Martin Le Vieux in 1629 and faced much opposition during his tenure as dean – an incessant pattern that significantly contributed to his death in 1645.

=== Calvinist discipline ===
The diaconal office consequently lapsed. The doctrine of John Calvin was observed under the direction of a consistory—a colleague and a synod. James I, on the understanding that this arrangement had been formally sanctioned by Elizabeth, confirmed it in the first year of his reign. He soon, however, repented of his decision and appointed a governor, Sir John Peyton, who was expressly charged with the duty of urging a return to unity with the English church.

Peyton's measures provoked a storm of anger and irritation, resulting in an appeal to the court of England. Archbishop Abbot commanded the Islanders, in the name of the king, to adopt again the English liturgy and make use of the Book of Common Prayer in all their churches. This act of authority was met with resistance, however, after a time ebbed. By the twenty-first year of James's reign the inhabitants' opinions had changed, such that an address, drawn up by Bandinel in conjunction with others of the clergy, was presented to the king, begging him to restore the office of dean and the use of the liturgy. Bandinel was then appointed dean, with instructions to draw up, for submission to the king, a body of canons agreeable to the discipline of the church of England, which were referred to a commission consisting of Archbishop Abbot, the lord keeper Williams, and Andrewes, bishop of Winchester. These were, after modification, confirmed, and the islands were placed under the jurisdiction of the dean, subject to the bishop of Winchester, in whose diocese they were declared to be.

=== English Civil War ===
The chief personal interest of Bandinel's life lies in the part he took in the dissensions that convulsed the island at the time of the troubles in England, his quarrel with the Carterets, and consequent tragic end. Sir Philip de Carteret was appointed Lieutenant Governor of Jersey by Charles I, and although a zealous Protestant, was always ardent loyalist. He is said to have been a man of ability and integrity, but of austere manners, and he was accused by his enemies of absorbing all the more lucrative offices. He was charged with attempting to deprive the Dean of part of his tithes, an aggression that roused in Bandinel an animosity to the lieutenant-governor that was fostered by subsequent events, and which endured throughout his life.

At the time of the English civil war, Bandinel was considered the head of the parliamentary party in Jersey, whose cause he is said to have espoused chiefly out of opposition to the leading loyalist, Carteret. When the parties conflicted, Bandinel held back all supplies from the fortresses of Elizabeth Castle and Mont Orgueil, where the lieutenant-governor and his wife were shut up. The rigors and mortifications that he had to endure brought Carteret to his grave, and in his last illness Bandinel evinced the bitterness of his enmity by refusing all spiritual and material comforts to the dying man, keeping even his wife from him until the last moment.

=== Imprisonment and death ===
On Carteret's death, in 1643, his nephew, Sir George Carteret, was appointed by the king to be lieutenant governor in his stead. The nephew succumbed to time his resentment for the treatment of his father, and his loyal zeal, by arresting Bandinel and his son, Jacques, on a charge of treason. They were confined in Elizabeth Castle and afterward in Mont Orgueil, where, after more than twelve months, they formed a plan for escape. Having made a rope of their bed-linen and such other material, on the night of 10 February 1645 they forced their way through the grating of their cell and proceeded to lower themselves down the side of their cell. The son succeeded in reaching the end of the line, which however, was too short: fell and was seriously injured; the dean's weight was such that he broke the line. He fell from a great height onto the rocks below, where he was discovered insensible by a sentinel on the following morning. His death came the following day. His son escaped, but was recaptured, and put in prison, where he died. Dean Bandinel was one of the rectors of the island, from which office, however, he derived but small emolument.
