= Branwalator =

Medieval British saint

- Born: Armorica
- Died: unknown
- Venerated in: Eastern Orthodoxy; Anglicanism; Catholic Church
- Major shrine: Milton Abbas, Dorset
- Feast: 6 June (in Jersey); 19 January (translation of relics)

Branwalator or Breward, also referred to as Branwalader, was a British saint whose relics lay at Milton Abbas in Dorset and Branscombe in Devon. Believed to come from Brittany, he also gives his name to the parish of Saint Brélade, Jersey. "Brelade" is a corruption of "Branwalader". He is also known as Breward or Branuvelladurus or Brélade and Broladre in French.

== Life ==
Branwalator was a British monk, who is said to have been a bishop in Jersey, although at the time, Jersey would have been part of the ancient diocese of Dol. As with many of the early saints of this part of the world, it is difficult to separate fact from fiction.

However, it is believed that Branwalator worked with Saint Samson in Cornwall and the Channel Islands, where he is remembered in Jersey in the parish name St Brelade and at Cornwall in the parish name of St Breward. He may also have travelled with Samson to Brittany in northern France.

In the Exeter martyrology, Branwalator is described as the son of the Cornish king, Kenen. This is the main source of hagiographical information regarding this saint, which otherwise is sparse.

== Veneration ==
Branwalator's feast day (in Jersey) is 6 June. In Cornwall he has feast days on 9 February and 6 June; 19 January maybe the day of the translation of his relics. In the Middle Ages, his feast was kept at Winchester, Exeter, and in Cornwall.

King Athelstan, who founded Milton Abbey in Dorset, obtained some of the saint's relics (an arm or head) from Breton clerics fleeing Northmen and moved them to Milton Abbey in 935. William Worcester claimed that the body itself was at Branston (or Branscombe) in Devon, and Leland referred to a chapel of Saint Breward near Seaton. The proper name of Milton Abbey is the Abbey Church of St. Mary, St. Samson and St. Branwalader.

The cultus of Saint Branwalator has been strong at least from the 10th century, when his name could be found in litanies. His feast was kept at Winchester, Exeter, and in Cornwall. In Brittany, he has sometimes been confused with Saint Brendan and Saint Brannock (Benedictines, Farmer).

== Churches and locations ==
=== Jersey ===
The Parish Church of St Brelade in Jersey is thought to date from the 10th or 11th century.

=== Cornwall ===
In Cornwall, the saint is known as St Breward. St Breward's church is the highest in Cornwall, located on Bodmin moor, in the village of the same name. The village had a Granite quarrying industry from ancient times; the Norman church was built from local stone. There are nearby stone circles. However, the village dates back to pre-Norman times when it was a series of small hamlets suspended along the western edge of Bodmin Moor.

There is also a St Breward's Well in Cornwall which is situated close to Camelford. It was visited by sufferers from inflamed eyes and other complaints, who would throw in a pin, or small coin, as an offering to the saint.

== Sources ==
- "St. Breward Marks the Millennium" by Pamela Bousfield (published in the Cornish Coracle)
- Doble, G. H. (1965) The Saints of Cornwall: part 4. Truro: Dean and Chapter; pp. 116–127
