= 2002 Jersey general election =

- 16 October 2002 (Senators); 27 November 2002 (Deputies)

35 of the 53 seats in the States Assembly

Elections were held in 2002 for both Senators and Deputies to the States of Jersey.

== Senator Elections ==
Candidate	Votes	%	Notes
Philip Ozouf	14,442	14.36	Elected
Wendy Kinnard	12,230	12.16	Elected
Paul Routier	11,687	11.62	Elected
Mike Vibert	10,564	10.51	Elected
Len Norman	10,192	10.14	Elected
Frank Walker	9,377	9.33	Elected
Guy de Faye	7,576	7.53	
Terry McDonald	7,488	7.45	
Corrie Stein	7,303	7.26	
Geraint Jennings	4,667	4.64	
Chris Whitworth	1,982	1.97	
Adrian Walsh	1,846	1.84	
Robert Partridge	1,201	1.19	

== Deputy Elections ==
=== St Helier Number One District ===
Candidates (3 Elected)

- Patrick Ryan 720
- Judy Martin 660
- Jerry Dorey 488
- Peter Pearce 352
- Chris Whitworth 252
- Percentage Turnout 29.57%, Spoilt Papers: 0

=== St Helier Number two district ===
Candidates (3 Elected)

- Jennifer Bridge 785
- Terry Le Main 658
- Geoff Southern 609
- Ian McFirbishigh 577
- Percentage Turnout 32%, Spoilt Papers 5

=== St Helier Number three and four district ===
Candidates (4 Elected)

- Jacqui Hilton 1359
- Jacqui Huet 1289
- Ben Fox 1233
- Guy de Faye 1191
- Denise Carroll 793
- Imogen Nicholls 724
- Geraint Jennings 486
- Percentage Turnout 33.6%, Spoilt papers 15

=== St Saviour Number one district ===
Candidate (2 elected)

- Celia Scott Warren 531
- Robert Duhamel 519
- Kevin Lewis 374
- Bob Mason 240
- Percentage Turnout 39.36%, Spoilt Papers 10

=== St Saviour Number two district ===
Candidates (2 elected)

- Alan Breckon
- Lyndon Farnham
- Unopposed.

=== St Saviour Number three district ===
Candidates (1 elected)

- Roy Le Herissier 500
- Karen Stevens 104
- Percentage Turnout 33.3, Spoilt Papers 3

=== St Brelade Number one district ===
Candidates (One elected)

- Sarah Ferguson 489
- Alastair Layzell 455
- Percentage Turnout 48%, Spoilt Papers 5

=== St Brelade Number two district ===
Candidates (2 elected)

- Peter Troy 961
- Julian Bernstein 640
- Jane Wakeham 599
- Terry Coutanche 397
- Stefan Gough 193
- Robert Partridge 92
- Percentage Turnout 37.04%, Spoilt Papers 16

=== St Clement ===
Candidates (2 elected)

- Mike Taylor 1024
- Gerard Baudins 811
- Mike Stayte 561
- John Pirouet 425
- Michael Green 163
- Percentage Turnout 34.88%, Spoilt Papers 15

=== Grouville ===
Candidates (1 elected)

- Carolyn Labey 774
- Patricia Anne Picot 397
- Percentage Turnout 41%, Spoilt Papers 4

=== St John ===
Candidates (1 elected)

- Phil Rondel
- Unopposed

=== St Lawrence ===
Candidates (2 elected)

- Francis Gerald Voisin 877
- Maurice Dubras 743
- Deidre Mezbourian 550
- Peter Whorrall 66
- Percentage Turnout 42.75%, Spoilt Papers 0

=== St Martin ===
Candidates (1 elected)

- Bob Hill 729
- Christopher Blackstone 539
- Percentage Turnout 56.5%, Spoilt Papers 6

=== St Mary ===
Candidates (1 elected)

- Geoffrey Grime 300
- Juliet Gallichan 296
- Percentage Turnout 57.25%, Spoilt Papers 4

=== St Ouen ===
Candidates (1 elected)

- James Reed 598
- Jean Amy Le Maistre 340
- Terence Allan Picot 340
- Percentage Turnout 54%, Spoilt Papers 7

=== St Peter ===
Candidates (1 elected)

- Collin Egre 711
- Malcolm L'Amy 338
- Percentage Turnout 42.28%, Spoilt Papers 5

=== Trinity ===
Candidates (1 elected)

- Geoffrey Grime
- Unopposed
