= 1996 Jersey general election =

- 16 October 1996 (Senators); 27 November 1996 (Deputies)

Elections were held in 1996 for both Senators and Deputies to the States of Jersey.

== Results ==
=== Senators ===
Candidate	Votes	%	Notes
Pierre Horsfall	14,681	13.45	Elected
Corrie Stein	11,213	10.27	Elected
Len Norman	11,017	10.09	Elected
Wendy Kinnard	10,520	9.63	Elected
Frank Walker	10,295	9.43	Elected
Nigel Quérée	9,761	8.94	Elected
Terry Le Main	9,578	8.77	
Mike Vibert	8,709	7.98	
David Moon	8,707	7.97	
Gary Matthews	6,463	5.92	
Bob Little	4,872	4.46	
Mike Dun	1,948	1.78	
Geoff Southern	1,429	1.31	

=== Deputies ===
Constituency	Candidate	Votes	%	Notes
Grouville	Imogen Nicholls	827	60.63	Elected
Grouville	Peter Amy	537	39.37	
St. Brelade 1	Alastair Layzell	653	72.39	Elected
St. Brelade 1	Marianne Pallot	249	27.61	
St. Brelade 2	Michael Vibert	865	23.67	Elected
St. Brelade 2	Maxwell de la Haye	566	15.49	Elected
St. Brelade 2	Graham Thorne	519	14.20	
St. Brelade 2	David Ratel	498	13.63	
St. Brelade 2	Angela Trigg	486	13.30	
St. Brelade 2	Nicholas Le Cornu	361	9.88	
St. Brelade 2	Thomas Jordan	359	9.82	
St. Clement	Stanley Le Cornu	1,764	48.62	Elected
St. Clement	Harry Baudains	1,169	32.22	Elected
St. Clement	Malcolm McEwen	420	11.58	
St. Clement	James Norman	275	7.58	
St. Helier 1	Paul Routier	721	29.51	Elected
St. Helier 1	Jerry Dorey	656	26.85	Elected
St. Helier 1	Ron Blampied	486	19.89	Elected
St. Helier 1	Glenn George	306	12.53	
St. Helier 1	Harry Cole	274	11.22	
St. Helier 2	Terry Le Main	669	30.14	Elected
St. Helier 2	Jimmy Johns	645	29.05	Elected
St. Helier 2	Simon Crowcroft	391	17.61	Elected
St. Helier 2	Dereck Carter	325	14.64	
St. Helier 2	Jimmy Barker	190	8.56	
St. Helier 3	Jacqueline Huet	1,384	21.61	Elected
St. Helier 3	Shirley Baudains	1,238	19.33	Elected
St. Helier 3	Terry Le Sueur	1,175	18.35	Elected
St. Helier 3	Graeme Rabet	987	15.41	Elected
St. Helier 3	Gary Matthews	812	12.68	
St. Helier 3	Geraint Jennings	568	8.87	
St. Helier 3	Geoff Southern	241	3.76	
St. John	Philip Ronde	695	64.95	Elected
St. John	Christopher Tylor	375	35.05	
St. Lawrence	Henry Coutanche	851	44.02	Elected
St. Lawrence	Maurice Dubras	767	39.68	Elected
St. Lawrence	Terence Crouch	315	16.30	
St. Martin	Frederick Hill	943	59.31	Elected
St. Martin	James Perchard	647	40.69	
St. Mary	Derek Maltwood Ryder	477	92.26	Elected
St. Mary	David Richardson	40	7.74	
St. Ouen	Kenneth Syvre	804	53.39	Elected
St. Ouen	David Moon	702	46.61	
St. Peter	Robin Hacquoil	723	58.83	Elected
St. Peter	Nicholas Le Couteur	506	41.17	
St. Saviour 1	Evelyn Pullin	—	—	Elected unopposed
St. Saviour 1	Robert Duhamel	—	—	Elected unopposed
St. Saviour 2	Margaret Le Geyt	—	—	Elected unopposed
St. Saviour 2	Alan Breckon	—	—	Elected unopposed
St. Saviour 3	Michael Wavell	410	51.77	Elected
St. Saviour 3	Anthony Nightingale	382	48.23	
Trinity	David Crespel	513	54.81	Elected unopposed
Trinity	Roselle Godeaux	423	45.19	
