= Centre Party (Jersey) =

Defunct political party in Jersey

- Chairman: Roger Benest
- Chief Executive Officer: Darius Pearce
- Founded: 2005
- Dissolved: 2007
- Ideology: Liberal conservatism Soft Euroscepticism
- Political position: Centre-right
- Colours: Purple & White

The Centre Party was a registered political party in Jersey between 2005 and 2007.

== Party ideology and policies ==
In the 2005 elections, the Centre Party's policies were:

- Against the proposed 3% Goods and Services Tax (GST)
- Against the continuation of the 20% income tax
- Abolish the Vehicle Registration Duty for smaller cars
- Would like to introduce a pay-as-you-earn (PAYE) system of income taxation
- Would like to introduce a Manx-style immigration policy
- Would like to introduced right-to-buy for State tenants.
- Encourage fish-farming and organic farming
- Encourage the use of renewable energy
- Permit English barristers to appear in the Jersey courts, changing the rule that Jersey advocates had exclusive rights of audience
- Separation of the spheres of executive and judicial areas.
- Reduce the number of Civil Service Departments.

== History ==
The Centre Party was one of two political parties formed in response to constitutional reforms due to be introduced in December 2005, when the States of Jersey Law 2005 implemented recommendations of the Clothier review by creating a system of ministerial government—with Council of Ministers headed by a Chief Minister in place of a committee-based system of administration.

Some of its founding members, including Senator Paul Le Claire, had initially belonged to Jersey Democratic Alliance – the other party created in 2005 – but left believing the JDA was too left wing. The Centre Party's first chairman was Larry Adams.

In 2006 the Centre Party renewed its commitment to instituting change in Jersey. At the 2006 Annual Meeting, Roger Benest was elected to serve as chairman with Larry Adams taking the role of Deputy Chairman. The party further indicated that it would support candidates in the 2008 Senatorial elections and renewed its commitment to implement its policies.

In 2007, the party announced that it would ballot its members on whether;

- To become the Jersey Conservative Party
- To become the Jersey Liberal Party
- How closely it should seek to affiliate to a United Kingdom party

It was announced in July 2007 that the Centre Party would contest the next elections as the Jersey Conservative Party.

== Election results ==
In the October 2005 elections two Centre Party candidates stood for the six vacant Senator seats. Neither was successful, with sitting Senator Paul Le Claire finishing 8th with 5,413 votes and losing his seat. The other Centre Party candidate, Kevin Lewis, polled 10th with 5,028 votes.

Six members of the Centre party stood in the November 2005 elections for deputies, though they did so as independents. Paul Le Claire and Kevin Lewis were elected as deputies, and reelected as independents in the 2008 elections.

== See also ==
- Political parties in Jersey
- Politics of Jersey
- Constitution of Jersey
