= 2005 Jersey general election =

- 19 October 2005 (Senators); 23 November 2005 (Deputies)

35 of the 53 seats in the States Assembly 27 seats needed for a majority
- Registered: 61,927
- Turnout: 45.6% (Note: Based on results for senators.)
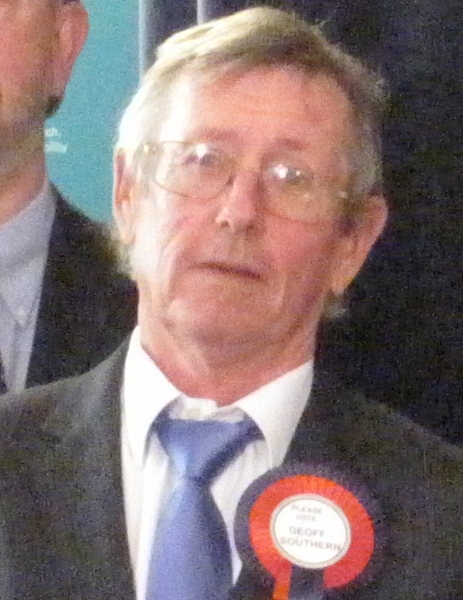
	First party	Second party	Third party
		CP	IND
Leader	Geoff Southern	Larry Adams	—
Party	JDA	Centre Party	Independent
Leader's seat	St Helier No. 2	Did not stand	—
Last election	New	New	35
Seats won	3 / 35	2 / 35	30 / 35
Seat change	▲3	▲2	▼5
Popular vote	12,506	12,571	116,696
Percentage	9.0%	9.0%	83.8%
President of the Policy and Resources Committee before election
Frank Walker
Independent
Chief Minister after election
Frank Walker
Independent

General elections were held in Jersey in 2005 to elect both Senators and Deputies to the States Assembly.

== Results ==
=== Results for senators ===
The results for the election of senators were as follows:

Party	Candidate	Votes	%	±%
Independent	Stuart Syvret	15,131	13.1	
Independent	Ben Shenton	14,025	12.2	
Independent	Freddie Cohen	13,704	11.9	
Independent	Terry Le Main	12,159	10.5	
Independent	Terry Le Sueur	9,976	8.6	
Independent	Jim Perchard	8,998	7.8	
Independent	Jerry Dorey	6,693	5.8	
Independent	Roy Travert	6,256	5.4	
Centre Party	Paul Le Claire	5,413	4.7	
JDA	Denise Carroll	5,081	4.4	
Centre Party	Kevin Lewis	5,028	4.4	
Independent	Guy de Faye	4,994	4.3	
JDA	Geoff Southern	4,720	4.1	
Independent	Roger Bisson	2,009	1.7	
Independent	Gino Risoli	1,127	1.0	
Rejected ballots		57	0.0	
Total votes		115,371	100	—
Turnout				

=== Results for deputies ===
The results for the election of deputies were as follows:

==== Grouville ====
Carolyn Labey was elected unopposed.

==== St Brelade No. 1 ====
Party	Candidate	Votes	%	±%
Independent	Sarah Ferguson	605	72.0	
Independent	Peter Le Maistre	232	27.6	
Rejected ballots		3	0.4	
Total votes		840	100	—
Turnout				

==== St Brelade No. 2 ====
Party	Candidate	Votes	%	±%
Independent	Sean Power	799	22.2	
Independent	Peter Troy	737	20.4	
JDA	Steve Pallett	667	18.5	
Independent	Julian Bernstein	462	12.8	
Independent	Jeffrey Hathaway	419	11.6	
Independent	Jane Wakeham	291	8.1	
Independent	Thomas Jordan	224	6.2	
Rejected ballots		6	0.2	
Total votes		3,605	100	—
Turnout				

==== St Clement ====
Party	Candidate	Votes	%	±%
Independent	Gerard Baudains	974	37.8	
Independent	Ian Gorst	930	36.1	
Independent	Michael Taylor	671	26.0	
Rejected ballots		3	0.1	
Total votes		2,578	100	—
Turnout				

==== St Helier No. 1 ====
Party	Candidate	Votes	%	±%
Centre Party	Paul Le Claire	644	23.5	
JDA	Judy Martin	628	22.9	
Independent	Patrick Ryan	605	22.0	
Independent	Jerry Dorsey	598	21.8	
Independent	Christopher Whitworth	264	9.6	
Rejected ballots		5	0.2	
Total votes		2,744	100	—
Turnout				

==== St Helier No. 2 ====
Party	Candidate	Votes	%	±%
JDA	Shona Pitman	625	20.1	
JDA	Geoff Southern	547	17.6	
Independent	Alan Maclean	434	13.9	
Independent	Roy Travert	398	12.8	
Independent	Peter Pearce	288	9.3	
Independent	Peter Tabb	285	9.2	
Centre Party	Stephen Beddoe	220	7.1	
Independent	Robert Bisson	187	6.0	
Centre Party	Adrian Walsh	122	3.9	
Rejected ballots		6	0.2	
Total votes		3,112	100	—
Turnout				

==== St Helier No. 3&4 ====
Party	Candidate	Votes	%	±%
Independent	Jaqueline Hilton	1,417	21.4	
Independent	Jacqueline Huet	1,285	19.4	
Independent	Ben Fox	1,144	17.3	
Independent	Guy de Faye	836	12.6	
JDA	Denise Carroll	786	11.9	
Centre Party	Barry Shelton	685	10.3	
Centre Party	Darius Pearce	459	6.9	
Rejected ballots		7	0.1	
Total votes		6,619	100	—
Turnout				

==== St John ====
Party	Candidate	Votes	%	±%
Independent	Andrew Lewis	524	47.5	
Independent	Christopher Taylor	290	26.3	
Independent	Michael Cotillard	284	25.7	
Rejected ballots		6	0.5	
Total votes		1,104	100	—
Turnout				

==== St Lawrence ====
Party	Candidate	Votes	%	±%
Independent	John Le Fondre	1,000	42.0	
Independent	Deidre Mezbourian	610	25.6	
Independent	Hugh Gill	435	18.3	
Independent	Julian Corbet	335	14.1	
Rejected ballots		3	0.1	
Total votes		2,383	100	—
Turnout				

==== St Martin ====
Bob Hill was elected unopposed.

==== St Mary ====
Party	Candidate	Votes	%	±%
Independent	Juliette Gallichan	428	81.1	
Independent	David Richardson	98	18.6	
Rejected ballots		2	0.4	
Total votes		528	100	—
Turnout				

==== St Ouen ====
James Reed was elected unopposed.

==== St Peter ====
Colin Egre was elected unopposed.

==== St Saviour No. 1 ====
Party	Candidate	Votes	%	±%
Independent	Robert Duhamel	622	39.6	
Independent	Celia Scott Warren	551	35.1	
Independent	Patrick Corker	389	24.8	
Rejected ballots		7	0.4	
Total votes		1,569	100	—
Turnout				

==== St Saviour No. 2 ====
Party	Candidate	Votes	%	±%
Independent	Alan Breckon	508	35.5	
Centre Party	Kevin Lewis	348	24.3	
Independent	Huw Shepheard	235	16.4	
Independent	Stewart Le Breton	215	15.0	
JDA	Rosemary Pestana	119	8.3	
Rejected ballots		8	0.6	
Total votes		1,433	100	—
Turnout				

==== St Saviour No. 3 ====
Roy Le Herissier was elected unopposed.

==== Trinity ====
Anne Pryke was elected unopposed.

== See also ==
- Elections in Jersey
- Political parties in Jersey
- Politics of Jersey
- Constitution of Jersey
