= Political parties in Jersey =

Politics in Jersey has traditionally been dominated by independent candidates and members of the States Assembly, although political parties have existed at various points in the island’s history. In modern times, the introduction of ministerial government in 2005 contributed to the formation of several new parties, most of which were short-lived.

Statutory registration of political parties was introduced in 2008 for parties wishing to endorse candidates in elections to the States Assembly. In 2026, the States Assembly approved the development of a voluntary code of conduct for political groups that are not registered parties.

== Intermittent party politics ==
Although Jersey politics has long been dominated by independent candidates, political parties and party-like groupings have appeared at several points in the island’s history. Pich and Reardon describe Jersey’s party politics as intermittent, noting earlier divisions between Magots and Charlots, post-war parties including the Jersey Democratic Movement and Jersey Progressive Party, and later organisations such as the Jersey Democratic Alliance, the Centre Party and Reform Jersey. They argue that the 2022 general election marked a significant change because political parties contested the election on a larger scale than before, although independent candidates continued to dominate the States Assembly. By the 2026 general election, however, only two parties fielded candidates and only one party (Reform Jersey) won seats.

Academic analysis of the 2022 election has described Jersey as being in the early stages of developing a party system. Studies of the 2022 parties found that party insiders sought to differentiate their organisations through values, identity and campaign presentation, but that several of the new party brands were not clearly understood by young voters.

== Currently registered parties ==
Since 2008, political parties that wish to endorse candidates in elections to the States Assembly have been required to register with the Royal Court under the Political Parties (Registration) (Jersey) Law 2008. There are currently three on the register but only Reform Jersey is represented in the Assembly.

List of present political parties
| Name | Year formed | Leader | States Members 2022-2026 Assembly | States Members 2026-2030 Assembly | Notes |
|---|---|---|---|---|---|
| Reform Jersey | 2014 | Lindsay Feltham and Montfort Tadier | 10 | 7 | Centre-left social democratic party. Formed as a pressure group in 2012, reconstituted as a political party in 2014. Three members served as ministers on the Council of Ministers 2024-2026. 16 members stood in the 2026 election. |
| People First Party | 2026 | Nick Le Cornu | N/A | 0 | Left, social justice, green. Two candidates stood unsuccessfully in 2026 election. |
| Advance Jersey (formerly Jersey Liberal Conservatives) | 2022 | Philip Bailhache | 2 | 0 | Centre-right, fiscally conservative, socially liberal. Formed as a political movement in 2021, reconstituted as a political party in 2022. No candidates stood in 2026 general election |

== Registered parties dissolved ==
Since the registration of political parties became mandatory in 2008, two parties have been formed and later dissolved.

| Name | Years active | Leader | States Members 2018-2022 Aassembly | States Members 2022-2026 Assembly | Notes |
|---|---|---|---|---|---|
| Jersey Alliance | 2021-2022 | Mark Boleat | 9 | 1 | Centre-right party. Dissolved after all but one of its candidates failed to secure a seat in the 2022 general election. Successful candidate sat as an independent. |
| Progress Party | 2021-2023 | Steve Pallet | 2 | 1 | Centrist, 'big tent' party. Entered into a pact with the Jersey Liberal Conservatives in the 2022 general election. Dissolved after party leader failed to secure a seat; remaining member continued to sit as an independent. |

== Parties formed before statutory regulation ==
The prospect of ministerial government, and of a clearer distinction between executive and non-executive members of the States Assembly, contributed to the formation of two political parties in advance of the 2005 election: the Jersey Democratic Alliance and the Centre Party. Both were active before the registration system for political parties was introduced in 2008.

| Name | Years active | Key figures | States Members | Notes |
|---|---|---|---|---|
| Jersey Democratic Alliance | 2005-2011 | Christine Papworth (chair); Ted Vibert; Tony Keogh; Geoff Southern; Steve Pallett; Dave Rotherham | Geoff Southern; Shona Pitman; Paul Le Claire; Debbie de Sousa; Judy Martin | Centre-left. Supported human rights and implementation of the Clothier recommendations. Received funding from the Joseph Rowntree Reform Trust. The party did not stand any candidates in the 2011 election. |
| Centre Party, subsequently the Jersey Conservative Party | 2005-2007 | Larry Adams; Roger Benest; Darius Pearce | Paul Le Claire; Kevin Lewis | Centre-right. Policies included opposition to GST, tax reform, immigration control, right-to-buy for States tenants and clearer separation between executive and judicial functions; in 2007 it announced that it would contest future elections as the Jersey Conservative Party. |

None of the candidates standing for a party was elected in the October 2005 senatorial elections. In the November 2005 elections for deputies, three JDA members and two members of the Centre Party were elected, all having stood as independents.

== Non-party political groups ==
The 2000 Clothier report on government reform observed that Jersey had often seen temporary political groupings and alliances formed around particular objectives, rather than parties based on a continuing philosophy of government. Ahead of the 2005 elections, a group called "Elect Jersey 2005" worked to assist some independent candidates prepare for the elections, helping them compete against candidates supported by the Jersey Democratic Alliance and the Centre Party.

In recent decades, several groups and organisations have formed ahead of elections. The role of such groups can be seen in the wider context of politics in small legislatures. A comparative study of parliaments without dominant parties included the Channel Islands among legislatures historically dominated by independents, and suggested that small scale, face-to-face politics and small assemblies may reduce the need for parties as electoral cues or organising structures, while making temporary coalitions more viable.

| Name | When active | Key people/ supporters | General aims |
|---|---|---|---|
| Time4Change | 2008 general election | Montford Tadier, Nick Le Cornu | Emerged out of protest meetings related to the historical child abuse inquiry; opposed to levying 3% goods and services tax. Tadier and Le Cornu later become members of Reform Jersey. Le Cornu later formed People First Party. |
| Jersey 2020 | 2008 general election | Mark Forskitt, Nick Palmer and Daniel Wimberley | Broad ‘green’ platform, including increasing recycling, local energy production, insulation grants, and opposition to new incinerator. Daniel Wimberley was elected Deputy for St Mary. |
| Small Society | 2011 general election | Geoffrey Grime; supported by Jersey Chamber of Commerce and other business organisations | Reduce public spending (’save first, tax last’), culture of accountability in civil service, share common functions with Guernsey, close public service final salary pension. An advert was ruled misleading. |
| Better Way 2022 | 2022 general election | Kristina Moore, who went on to become Chief Minister | The group said its principles were responsive government, evidence-based and sustainable decision-making, affordable public spending, respect for diversity, international engagement, and support for business and entrepreneurship. Four of its members were elected to the States Assembly in 2022. |
| Value Jersey | 2026 general election | Gerald Voisin | Policy programme emphasised lower taxes, spending restraint, deregulation, increased competition in retail, taxis and banking, digital government reform, and support for business growth. Six independent candidates supporting Value Jersey elected to the States Assembly in 2026. |

In January 2026, the States Assembly approved a recommendation that the Jersey Electoral Authority should produce a voluntary code of practice for political groups ('all political movements, collaborations or campaigns') standing candidates for the 2026 election. After the 2026 general election, the international Election Observation Mission and the Jersey Electoral Authority both raised concerns about whether election law provided a level playing field between registered political parties and non-party campaign groups.

== Earlier history of political parties ==
=== 18th and 19th centuries ===
Historically, two parties dominated Jersey politics.

| Party name | Emblem and colour | Key figures | Aims |
|---|---|---|---|
| Jeannot party (also known as the ‘Magots’) | Laurel leaf, green | Jean Dumaresq | Advocated democratic reform |
| Charlot party (the ‘Charlots’) | Rose, pink | Charles Lemprière | Preserving established power arrangements |

Originating in the 1770s, the Jeannot party formed around the radical lawyer and Connétable, Jean Dumaresq, who opposed the cabal of Jurats who surrounded Lieutenant-Bailiff Charles Lemprière (whose supporters became known as the Charlot party). The Jeannots rapidly adopted the nickname of Magots (cheese mites) after their opponents boasted of aiming to crush them like mites.

Dumaresq believed in political reform and was an early example of a Liberal. He believed in democratic reform - that the States should have vested in them executive power and should be composed democratically elected Deputies.^{:200}

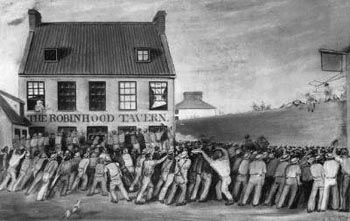
Bread riots in St Helier, 1847

After the Napoleonic Wars, the parties were still existent. St Ouen provided each party with an emblem and a name: the Charlots (the Conservatives, sporting a rose) and the Magots (the Progressives, sporting a laurel leaf).^{:231}

The symbolism soon became entrenched to the extent that gardens displayed their owners' allegiances, and pink or green paintwork also showed political sympathies. Still today in Jersey, the presence of established laurels or rose gardens in old houses gives a clue to the past party adherence of former owners, and the chair of the Constable of Saint Helier in the Assembly Room of the Parish Hall still sports the carved roses of a former incumbent.

In order to help control voting in Jersey, it was not unknown for citizens to find themselves taken and stranded on the Écréhous until after voting had taken place. By the time of the introduction of the secret ballot in 1891, party politics had waned.

Blues and Reds contested local elections into the 1920s, but Islandwide party politics lay dormant until the post-Occupation elections under the new Constitution of 1948.

=== After the Occupation ===
After liberation in 1945, demands for constitutional and social reform gave rise to a short period of organised party politics. The German occupation had exposed weaknesses in Jersey's pre-war political institutions, and the Jersey Democratic Movement (JDM), which had circulated leaflets during the occupation, criticised the wartime Superior Council and alleged corruption and collaboration by States officials. After liberation, the JDM called for constitutional change and campaigned on a programme that included replacing the States with 34 paid deputies elected on a population basis, together with old-age pensions, housing and rent controls, family allowances, health insurance, education improvements, progressive income tax and death duties.

A second reform party, the Jersey Progressive Party (JPP), was formed in late October 1945 as a direct response to the JDM. Its founders were mainly business people who wanted greater representation for commercial interests in the States, together with returning evacuees and some pre-war States members. Several people associated with the wartime Channel Islands Study Group and its 1944 publication Nos Îles later played a part in post-war reform politics; Cyril Le Marquand and Charles Rumfitt were contributors to the publication and as founder members of the JPP. The JPP adopted a more moderate reform programme than the JDM, supporting a mainly elected States, old-age pensions, health insurance, family allowances and improved education and training, while retaining traditional offices such as Jurat and Constable in modified form.

In the December 1945 election, the JPP won a clear victory: 13 of its candidates were elected, while only one JDM candidate succeeded. The JDM performed better in urban constituencies than in the country parishes, but its campaign was damaged by its perceived association with communism, including support from The Workers Review, a publication associated with the local Communist Party, and the communist sympathies of Norman Le Brocq, one of its founders. Although the election did not create a lasting party system, it gave reformers a mandate. The post-war reforms enacted in 1948 removed the Jurats and Rectors from the States, created 12 island-wide Senators, and increased the number of Deputies from 17 to 28.

== See also ==
- Politics of Jersey
- Pressure groups in Jersey
- Government of Jersey
- Constitution of Jersey
- List of political parties by country
