= 2008 Jersey general election =

- 15 October 2008 (Senators and Constables); 26 November 2008 (Deputies)

44 of the 53 seats in the States Assembly
Chief Minister before election
Frank Walker
Independent
Chief Minister after election
Terry Le Sueur
Independent

General elections were held in Jersey in two stages in October and November 2008.

== Results ==
=== Constables ===
For the first time since 1948 the elections of constables for the twelve parishes of Jersey have been synchronised so that polling, where necessary, will take place on the same day as the senatorial election on 15 October 2008, in accordance with the Connétables (Jersey) Law 2008 (registered 28 March 2008).

At Assemblies of Electors held in nine parishes on 17 September 2008, constables in five parishes were returned unopposed: St Brelade, St Martin, St Ouen, Trinity and St Saviour. The constables of the other parishes declined to stand down to recontest their seats, preferring to serve out their full term so that the provisions of the law will apply to the next mandate from 2011.

Parish	Candidate	Votes	%	Notes
Grouville	Dan Murphy	—	—	Elected unopposed
St. Brelade	Mike Jackson	—	—	Elected unopposed
St. Clement	Leonard Norman	1,593	61.58	Elected
St. Clement	Gerard Baudains	740	28.60	
St. Clement	Edgar Wallis	254	9.82	
St. Helier	Simon Crowcroft	—	—	Elected unopposed
St. John	Graeme Butcher	—	—	Elected unopposed
St. Lawrence	Deidre Mezbourain	1,300	62.32	Elected
St. Lawrence	Tim Tindall	382	18.31	
St. Martin	Silva Yates	—	—	Elected unopposed
St. Mary	Juliette Gallichan	404	66.45	Elected
St. Mary	Terry Renouf	204	33.55	
St. Ouen	Ken Vibert	—	—	Elected unopposed
St. Peter	John Refault	975	57.35	Elected
St. Peter	Collin Egré	725	42.65	
St. Saviour	Peter Hanning	—	—	Elected unopposed
Trinity	John Gallichan	—	—	Elected unopposed

=== Senators ===
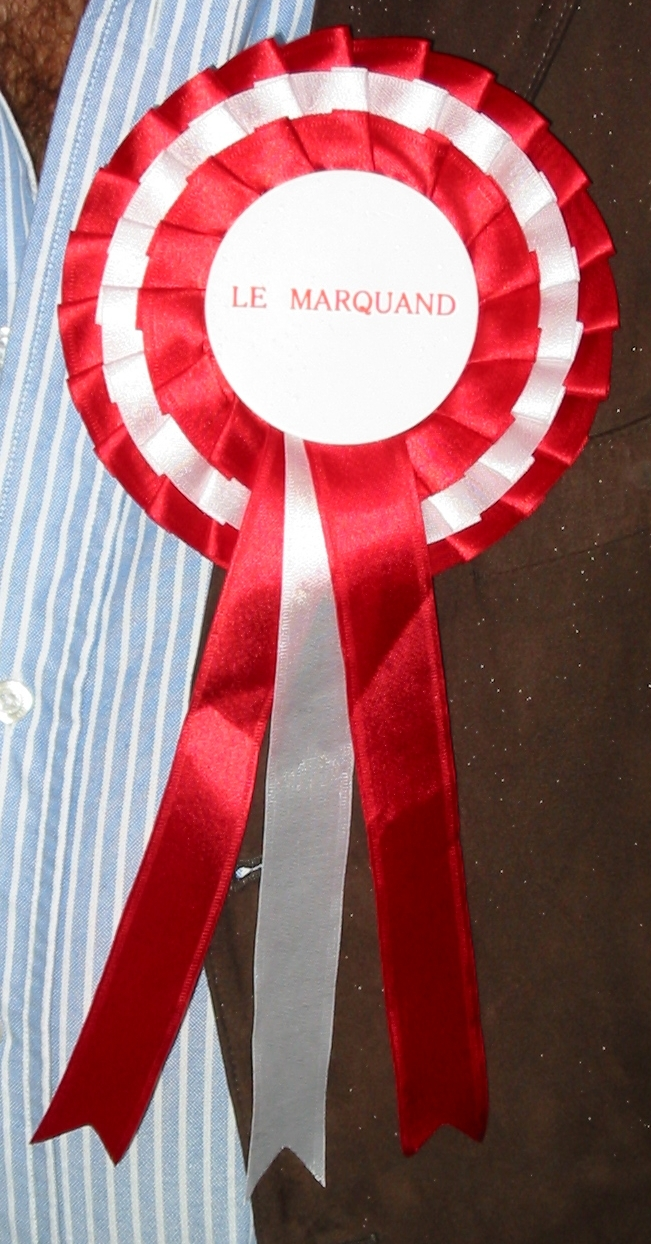
Rosette worn by a Le Marquand supporter

The senatorial election took place on 15 October 2008. The election was island-wide and there were six seats available. At the Assembly of Electors held in Saint Helier on 16 September 2008, 21 candidates were nominated.

Three sitting senators did not seek re-election:

- Wendy Kinnard
- Frank Walker
- Leonard Norman (confirmed June 2008 his intention to stand for Constable of St. Clement)

The following candidates were sitting senators seeking re-election:

- Philip Ozouf
- Paul Routier
- Mike Vibert

The following candidates were sitting deputies seeking who ran in the senatorial election:

- Alan Breckon
- Sarah Ferguson
- Alan Maclean
- Peter Troy
- Geoff Southern

Candidates declared the following political affiliations:

- Deputy Geoff Southern and Trevor Pitman were candidates of the Jersey Democratic Alliance
- Nick Le Cornu and Montfort Tadier were members of Time4Change/Reform
- Daniel Wimberley, Mark Forskitt, and Nick Palmer are members of Jersey 2020

Jersey senatorial election, 2008
Party	Candidate	Votes	Percentage
Independent	Ian Le Marquand	14,238	12.35%
Independent	Alan Breckon	10,273	8.91%
Independent	Alan Maclean	9,094	7.89%
Independent	Paul Routier (incumbent)	8,775	7.61%
Independent	Philip Ozouf (incumbent)	8,712	7.55%
Independent	Sarah Ferguson	8,576	7.45%
Jersey Democratic Alliance	Geoff Southern	7,194	6.24%
Independent	Mike Higgins	6,979	6.05%
Independent	Mike Vibert (incumbent)	6,098	5.29%
Time4Change/Reform	Montfort Tadier	5,011	4.34%
Jersey Democratic Alliance	Trevor Pitman	4,931	4.28%
Independent	Peter Troy	3,927	3.40%
Independent	Cliff Le Clercq	3,597	3.12%
Jersey 2020	Daniel Wimberley	3,458	3.00%
Independent	Jeremy Maçon	3,130	2.71%
Time4Change/Reform	Nick Le Cornu	3,074	2.67%
Independent	Chris Perkins	2,768	2.40%
Jersey 2020	Mark Forskitt	1,922	1.67%
Jersey 2020	Nick Palmer	1,538	1.33%
Independent	Adrian Walsh	1,210	1.05%
Independent	Mick Pashley	682	0.59%
Invalid or blank votes		144	0.12%
Voter turnout		44.13%	

=== Deputies ===
The election for deputies took place on 26 November 2008. Twelve new deputies were elected, five sitting deputies lost their seats and four were reelected without opposition.

Constituency	Candidate	Votes	%	Notes
Grouville	Carolyn Labey	—	—	Elected unopposed
St. Brelade 1	Angela Jeune	370	57.10	Elected
St. Brelade 1	Mark Sutton	192	29.63	
St. Brelade 1	Alan Beadle	86	13.27	
St. Brelade 2	Sean Power	1,068	29.24	Elected
St. Brelade 2	Montfort Tadier	758	20.75	Elected
St. Brelade 2	Mervyn Le Masurier	462	12.65	
St. Brelade 2	Jeffrey Hathaway	420	11.50	
St. Brelade 2	Graham Truscott	411	11.25	
St. Brelade 2	Martha Bernstein	326	8.92	
St. Brelade 2	Richard De La Haye	179	4.90	
St. Brelade 2	John Le Galle	29	0.79	
St. Clement	Ian Gorst	1,112	36.34	Elected
St. Clement	Anne Dupre	868	28.37	Elected
St. Clement	Gerard Baudains	731	23.89	
St. Clement	Jeremy Strickland	303	9.90	
St. Clement	Philip Maguire	46	1.50	
St. Helier 1	Paul Le Claire	634	21.95	Elected
St. Helier 1	Judith Martín	601	20.81	Elected
St. Helier 1	Trevor Pitman	487	16.86	Elected
St. Helier 1	Nicholas Le Cornu	406	14.06	
St. Helier 1	Katy Ringsdore	387	13.40	
St. Helier 1	Brian Beadle	229	7.93	
St. Helier 1	Christopher Whitworth	144	4.99	
St. Helier 2	Geoff Southern	665	24.20	Elected
St. Helier 2	Shona Pitman	598	21.76	Elected
St. Helier 2	Deborah De Sousa	444	16.16	Elected
St. Helier 2	Roderick Bryans	412	14.99	
St. Helier 2	Susan Stoker	301	10.95	
St. Helier 2	Adrian Walsh	228	8.30	
St. Helier 2	Giffard Aubin	100	3.64	
St. Helier 3	Jacqueline Hilton	1,259	16.20	Elected
St. Helier 3	Michael Higgins	1,193	15.35	Elected
St. Helier 3	Andrew Green	1,057	13.60	Elected
St. Helier 3	Ben Fox	698	8.98	Elected
St. Helier 3	Suzette Hase	697	8.97	
St. Helier 3	Jacqueline Huet	645	8.30	
St. Helier 3	Stephan Beddoe	627	8.07	
St. Helier 3	David Beuzeval	587	7.55	
St. Helier 3	Guy de Faye	359	4.62	
St. Helier 3	Gilbert Blackwood	340	4.38	
St. Helier 3	Colin Russell	308	3.96	
St. John	Philip Rondel	678	63.13	Elected
St. John	Patrick Ryan	396	36.87	
St. Lawrence	John Le Fondré	918	42.27	Elected
St. Lawrence	Edward Noel	518	23.85	Elected
St. Lawrence	Hugh Gill	462	21.27	
St. Lawrence	Nicholas Palmer	274	12.62	
St. Martin	Frederick Hill	832	75.16	Elected
St. Martin	Martin Greene	275	24.84	
St. Mary	Daniel Wimberley	261	52.73	Elected
St. Mary	Robert Johnson	206	41.62	
St. Mary	David Richardson	28	5.66	
St. Ouen	James Reed	—	—	Elected unopposed
St. Peter	Collin Egré	731	52.40	Elected
St. Peter	Julie Rabet	664	47.60	
St. Saviour 1	Rob Duhamel	569	31.11	Elected
St. Saviour 1	Jeremy Maçon	448	24.49	Elected
St. Saviour 1	Anthony Leonard Charles Nightingale	424	23.18	
St. Saviour 1	Celia Joyce Scott Warren	388	21.21	
St. Saviour 2	Kevin Lewis	509	38.47	Elected
St. Saviour 2	Glenn George	260	19.65	Elected
St. Saviour 2	Tracey Vallois	227	17.16	
St. Saviour 2	Christine Papworth	198	14.97	
St. Saviour 2	Clifford Le Clercq	129	9.75	
St. Saviour 3	Roy Le Hérissier	—	—	Elected unopposed
Trinity	Anne Pryke	—	—	Elected unopposed

== CET referendum ==
A referendum on the question "Do you think that Jersey should adopt Central European Time?" was put to voters on 15 October.

Choice	Votes	%
For	6,564	27.59
Against	17,230	72.41
Total	23,794	100.00
Valid votes	23,794	97.76
Invalid/blank votes	544	2.24
Total votes	24,338	100.00
Registered voters/turnout	55,142	44.14
Source: Direct Democracy

== Voting age reduced ==
The 2008 general election is the first in which 16- and 17-year-old voters will take part, following a law to reduce voting age to 16. The law was brought into force on 12 March 2008 and became effective on 1 April 2008.

== See also ==
- Elections in Jersey
- Political parties in Jersey
- Politics of Jersey
- Constitution of Jersey
