= Jersey Democratic Alliance =

- Chairman: Christine Papworth
- Founded: 2005
- Dissolved: 2011
- Ideology: Labourism; Open government Electoral reform
- Political position: Centre-left
- Colours: Blue, Red & White

Website
- http://jdajersey.co.uk

The Jersey Democratic Alliance was a political party in Jersey. JDA candidates contested general elections in 2005 and 2008 but announced in August 2011 that it would not be fielding candidates in the October 2011 elections.

== Party ideology and policies ==
The JDA was a centre-left political party. Its stated aims and objectives in 2011 were:

- "Government in Jersey should be open, honest and transparent."
- "The public interest will be paramount at all times."
- "Government in Jersey will be open, honest and transparent."
- "Trade unions will be recognised as an important part of Jersey society."
- "The role of States members is to do the greatest good for the greatest number."
- "The JDA believes that Jersey is a special place with unique laws and customs, countryside, traditions, language and privileges and that these must be preserved and maintained when it is clear that their retention is appropriate."
- "To ensure that policies put forward promote the values enshrined in the European Convention of Human Rights."
- "We have now added to those our number one aim which is to reform the States along the principles of Clothier."

In December 2006 the JDA presented an extensive and detailed proposal for electoral reform, to tackle Jersey's lack of political engagement among the general public.

In February 2007 the JDA released their environmental policy, with a general moderate green outlook, and addressing Jersey's outdated approaches to waste disposal and building insulation in particular

On 12 July 2007 the JDA teamed up with the Jersey Chamber of Commerce and the Jersey Hospitality Association to address concerns over the introduction of Goods and Services Tax (GST) planned for April 2008, they also issued a statement on the planned 'Zero-Ten' corporate tax rates.

== History ==
The JDA was formed in the spring of 2005 in response to constitutional reforms due to be introduced in December 2005, when the States of Jersey Law 2005 implemented recommendations of the Clothier review by creating a system of ministerial government—with Council of Ministers headed by a Chief Minister in place of a committee-based system of administration.

The party was launched in April 2005 at a mass rally of 1,000 people held at Fort Regent, with the intention of fielding candidates in the 2005 elections of senators and deputies to the States of Jersey. The JDA's founder was Senator Ted Vibert, a returned expatriate and veteran activist in the Australian Labor Party who had been elected to the States of Jersey in February 2003. In June 2005, however, Vibert announced that on medical advice he would not be standing for re-election in the October 2005 election. His successor as head of the party, Tony Keogh (a retired rector of Trinity), also stepped down on medical advice. In June 2005, Geoff Southern was elected as party leader. Some members, including Senator Paul Le Claire feared that under Southern the JDA would move too far to the left, and formed the Centre Party. At the JDA's inaugural annual general meeting in July 2005, Southern said that "the party would continue to maintain the centre ground of politics despite claims from a breakaway group that the alliance had moved to the left under his leadership". The JDA launched its manifesto to a crowd of 150 people in People's Park in September 2005.

Following a poor performance in the 2005 elections, Steve Pallett replaced Geoff Southern as party leader and in 2006 the JDA announced that it would relaunch itself as a political pressure group rather than continue as a political party. In 2007, the JDA was awarded a grant of £27,805 from the Joseph Rowntree Reform Trust, a political body that promotes democratic reform and social justice, "to ensure that the people of Jersey have the opportunity to vote for an opposition party that would scrutinise the government".

In 2008, the JDA distanced itself from the pressure group Time4Change.

Following the 2008 elections, two successful JDA candidates — Geoff Southern and Shona Pitman — were charged with breaching Article 39A of the Public Elections (Jersey) Law 2002, which prohibits a candidate or representative from interfering with a person's application for registration to vote. Southern and Pitman had opposed the introduction of this law when it was debated in the States assembly in 2008. He said he would "continue to assist people who ask me to help them fill in the form … I am among those who may well be prosecuted under the bureaucratic nonsense of a piece of law" and she said "… if this [the prohibition created by Article 39A] goes through as law I will ignore it and continue with collecting these postal votes". On 20 February 2009, Pitman and Southern pleaded guilty in Magistrate's Court to breaking the law "by assisting about 70 elderly, infirm or busy people to complete a postal vote application form in the election and/or delivering their completed forms" and they were committed to the Royal Court for sentencing. In mitigation their advocate submitted that the law infringed the human rights of the disabled and infirm to take part in the electoral process and the debate on Article 39A in the States had been flawed. Southern was sentenced to a fine of £10,000 and Pitman to a fine of £2,000. The party launched a "Fund for Justice" for people to make contributions towards the fines and court costs.

In the summer of 2010, Vibert returned as honorary president of the party, having plans to move the JDA "from the left to the centre ground of Jersey politics".

Deputies Pitman, Pitman and de Sousa resigned from the JDA, along with the party's deputy chairman David Rotherham, in August 2010. In the run-up to the October 2011 elections, the three deputies continued to sit as independents, leaving Southern as the only member of the States assembly formally affiliated to a political party.

In May 2011, Vibert resigned as party leader, citing policy differences.

In August 2011, Southern announced that he would be standing as an independent in the October 2011 elections. The party disbanded shortly afterwards.

== Electoral performance ==
In 2005, Geoff Southern and Denise Carroll stood as JDA candidates in elections for six vacant Senator seats in the States of Jersey. Both were unsuccessful, polling 10th and 13th of the fifteen candidates. In the subsequent elections for Deputies, the JDA followed the Centre Party in announcing that JDA members seeking election would do so as independents.

- In St Helier No.1 constituency, serving Deputy Judy Martin retained her seat
- In St Helier No.2, serving Deputy Geoff Southern was re-elected and newcomer Shona Pitman topped the poll
- In St Helier No.3 and 4, Denise Carroll was finished 5th and so failed to gain one of the four seats
- In St Brelade No.2, Steve Pallett was not elected.

In January 2008, JDA candidate Alvin Aaron was unsuccessful in his attempt to unseat Simon Crowcroft, the incumbent Connétable of St Helier.

In 2008, Geoff Southern and Trevor Pitman stood as JDA candidates for the six vacant Senator seats. They failed to be elected, Southern finishing in 7th place and Pitman finishing 11th out of 21 candidates. In the subsequent elections for Deputies, the JDA achieved its greatest electoral success, with four of its five candidates elected. Geoff Southern, Shona Pitman and Debbie de Sousa took all three seats in the St Helier No. 2 constituency and Trevor Pitman gained one of the three seats in the St Helier No. 1 constituency. JDA candidate Christine Papworth was unsuccessful in St Saviour No.2.

In June 2010, Southern stood in a by-election for a vacant senatorial seat, finishing fifth out of nine candidates.

== See also ==
- Political parties in Jersey
- Politics of Jersey
- Constitution of Jersey
