= Vibert =

Vibert may refer to the following notable people:

Given name

- Vibert Douglas (1894–1988), Canadian astronomer
- Vibert Greene (born 1960), Barbadian cricketer

Surname

- James Vibert (1872-1942), Swiss sculptor
- Jean-Pierre Vibert (1777–1866), French rosarian
- Jehan Georges Vibert (1840–1902), French academic painter
- Luke Vibert (born 1973), a British recording artist and producer
- Mike Vibert (born 1950), Minister for Education, Sport and Culture in Jersey
- Ronan Vibert (1964–2022), Welsh actor
- Ted Vibert (born 1938), politician in the States of Jersey
