= 1999 Jersey general election =

- 20 October 1999 (Senators); 24 November 1999 (Deputies)

Elections were held in 1999 for both Senators and Deputies to the States of Jersey.

== Results ==
=== Senators ===
| Candidate | Votes | % | Notes |
|---|---|---|---|
| Stuart Syvret | 15,212 | 14.21 | Elected |
| Christopher Lakeman | 12,806 | 11.96 | Elected |
| Terry Le Sueur | 10,471 | 9.78 | Elected |
| Paul Le Claire | 8,287 | 7.74 | Elected |
| Jean Le Maistre | 7,796 | 7.28 | Elected |
| Ann Bailhache | 7,295 | 6.81 | Elected |
| Jerry Dorey | 6,530 | 6.10 | |
| Roy Le Hérissier | 5,206 | 4.86 | |
| Derek Bernard | 4,679 | 4.37 | |
| John Rothwell | 4,458 | 4.16 | |
| Peter Walsh | 4,082 | 3.81 | |

=== Deputies ===
| Constituency | Candidate | Votes | % | Notes |
|---|---|---|---|---|
| Grouville | Imogen Nicholls | 997 | 67.64 | Elected |
| Grouville | David Cadoret | 477 | 32.36 | |
| St. Brelade 1 | Alastair Layzell | — | — | Elected unopposed |
| St. Brelade 2 | Mike Vibert | 1,202 | 48.55 | Elected |
| St. Brelade 2 | Peter Troy | 847 | 34.21 | Elected |
| St. Brelade 2 | Denis Pipon | 427 | 17.25 | |
| St. Clement | Harry Baudains | — | — | Elected unopposed |
| St. Clement | Gerard Baudains | — | — | Elected unopposed |
| St. Helier 1 | Paul Routier | 718 | 26.99 | Elected |
| St. Helier 1 | Jerry Dorey | 463 | 17.41 | Elected |
| St. Helier 1 | Ted Vibert | 411 | 15.45 | Elected |
| St. Helier 1 | Robert Brown | 277 | 10.41 | |
| St. Helier 1 | Harry Cole | 270 | 10.15 | |
| St. Helier 1 | Geno Gouveia | 262 | 9.85 | |
| St. Helier 1 | Glenn George | 259 | 9.74 | |
| St. Helier 2 | Simon Crowcroft | 818 | 24.59 | Elected |
| St. Helier 2 | Terry Le Main | 782 | 23.50 | Elected |
| St. Helier 2 | Jennifer Bridge | 674 | 20.26 | Elected |
| St. Helier 2 | Jimmy Johns | 526 | 15.81 | |
| St. Helier 2 | Catherine Walton | 248 | 7.45 | |
| St. Helier 2 | Bernie Manning | 211 | 6.34 | |
| St. Helier 2 | Jon Arnold | 68 | 2.04 | |
| St. Helier 3 | Philip Ozouf | 1,618 | 21.52 | Elected |
| St. Helier 3 | Ben Fox | 1,395 | 18.55 | Elected |
| St. Helier 3 | Jacqueline Huet | 1,380 | 18.35 | Elected |
| St. Helier 3 | Shirley Baudains | 786 | 10.45 | Elected |
| St. Helier 3 | Graeme Rabe | 763 | 10.15 | |
| St. Helier 3 | Robert Weston | 734 | 9.76 | |
| St. Helier 3 | Michael Dunn | 490 | 6.52 | |
| St. Helier 3 | Eric Walker | 354 | 4.71 | |
| St. John | Phillip Rondel | — | — | Elected unopposed |
| St. Lawrence | Maurice Dubras | — | — | Elected unopposed |
| St. Lawrence | Gerald Voisin | — | — | Elected unopposed |
| St. Martin | Bob Hill | 943 | 79.38 | Elected |
| St. Martin | Nick Jouault | 245 | 20.62 | |
| St. Mary | Derek Maltwood Ryder | — | — | Elected unopposed |
| St. Ouen | Kenneth Syvre | — | — | Elected unopposed |
| St. Peter | Robin Hacquoil | 634 | 80.97 | Elected |
| St. Peter | Linda Corby | 149 | 19.03 | |
| St. Saviour 1 | Rob Duhamel | 462 | 26.04 | Elected |
| St. Saviour 1 | Celia Scott-Warren | 304 | 17.14 | Elected |
| St. Saviour 1 | Peter Walsh | 246 | 13.87 | |
| St. Saviour 1 | George Thornhill | 234 | 13.19 | |
| St. Saviour 1 | Robert Gilmore | 224 | 12.63 | |
| St. Saviour 1 | Patrick Corkery | 205 | 11.56 | |
| St. Saviour 1 | Craig Leach | 99 | 5.58 | |
| St. Saviour 2 | Alan Breckon | 598 | 33.90 | Elected |
| St. Saviour 2 | Lyndon Farnham | 571 | 32.37 | Elected |
| St. Saviour 2 | Martin Sayers | 345 | 19.56 | |
| St. Saviour 2 | Margaret Le Geyt | 204 | 11.56 | |
| St. Saviour 2 | Norman Miller | 46 | 2.61 | |
| St. Saviour 3 | Roy Le Herissier | 406 | 54.42 | Elected |
| St. Saviour 3 | Tom Binet | 340 | 45.58 | |
| Trinity | David Crespel | — | — | Elected unopposed |
