= Guy de Faye =

Jersey journalist and politician

Minister of Transport and Technical Services
- In office Dec 2005 – December 2008
- Preceded by: None
- Succeeded by: Constable Michael Jackson
- Constituency: States Assembly

Deputy
- In office Dec 2002 – December 2008
- Preceded by: Philip Ozouf
- Succeeded by: Mike Higgins and Andrew Green
- Constituency: Saint Helier district 3&4

Personal details
- Born: 1955 (age 70–71) Saint Helier, Jersey
- Party: Independent
- Occupation: Journalist

Guy de Faye (born 1955) is a former news presenter, and former member of the States of Jersey who was first elected in 2002 as Deputy, and re-elected in 2005.

He was Jersey's first Minister for Transport and Technical Services

== Biography ==
Guy de Faye was born in Saint Helier, Jersey in 1955. He was educated at Grouville Primary School, then at Victoria College Preparatory, and at Victoria College. He gained a BA (Hons) degree in law from Kingston University (Surrey). He was the president of Kingston Polytechnic Student Union.

He worked for eight years as a reporter for Channel Television, then worked as a States commentator for BBC Radio Jersey, the Jersey Journal before moving to the United Kingdom where he worked for ITN World News CNBC's "Europe Today" and finally as the English language commentator on EuroNews 24 hour.

== Electoral history ==
=== Ministerial Elections ===
He defeated Senator Leonard Norman for the position of Transport and Technical Services minister in a vote of the States Assembly in Dec 2005.

=== Senator Elections ===
De Faye ran unsuccessfully for Senator in 2002 finishing 7th of the candidates, and again in 2005 when he received 4,994 votes finishing 12th of the fifteen candidates.

=== Deputy Elections ===
He served as Deputy for Saint Helier number 3 & 4 district, a position he was first elected to in 2002 with 1,191 votes polling 4th of seven candidates and he held his seat in the 2005 elections where he polled 836 votes finishing 4th of the seven candidates.

He was defeated in the 2008 Jersey general election, coming 9th of eleven candidates with 359 votes.

He ran again in the 2022 Jersey general election for Grouville and St Martin., coming last of six candidates with 491 votes.
