= 1999 Jersey by-elections =

20th century by-elections

The following by elections took place in Jersey in 1999.

== Senator By Election ==
February 1999

=== Results ===
- Jerry Dorey 3,320
- Paul Le Claire 1,811
- Harry Cole 923
- Geraint Jennings 440

== Deputy By Election ==
St Helier Number One by election held April 1999 to replace Jerry Dorey who had been elected as Senator in February 1999.

=== Results ===
- Paul Le Claire 236 votes
- Jennifer Bridge 159 votes
- John De Carteret 138 votes
- Harry Cole 125 votes
