= Philip Ozouf =

Jersey politician

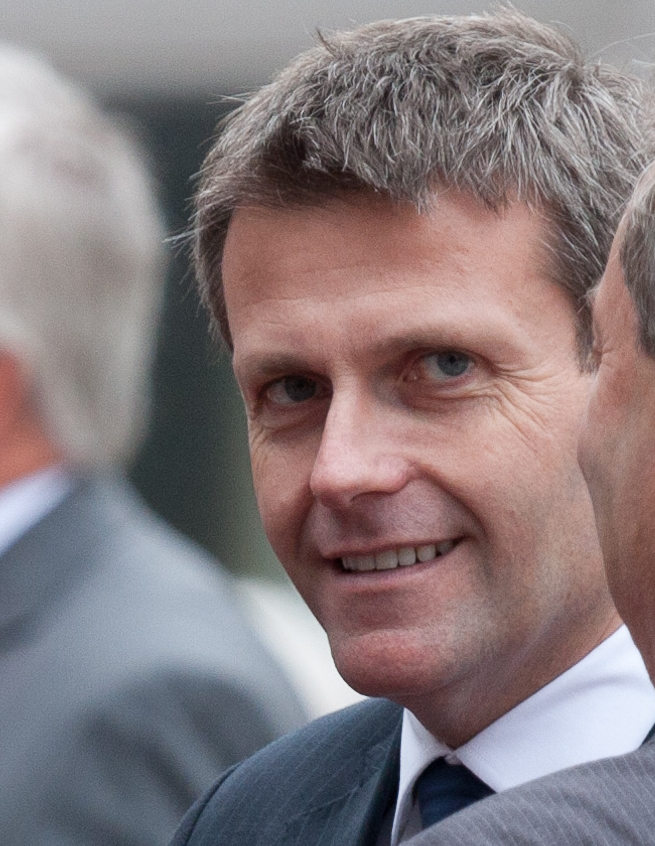
- Ozouf in 2012

Deputy of St Saviour
- Incumbent
- Assumed office 27 June 2022 Serving with Raluca Kovacs, Malcolm Ferey, Louise Doublet, Tom Binet
- Chief Minister: Kristina Moore (2022-2024) Lyndon Farnham (2024-)

Minister for External Relations
- In office 12 July 2022 – 30 January 2024
- Preceded by: Ian Gorst
- Succeeded by: Ian Gorst

Minister for Treasury and Resources
- In office November 2008 – November 2014
- Preceded by: Senator Terry Le Sueur
- Succeeded by: Senator Alan Maclean
- Constituency: Jersey

Minister for Economic Development
- In office 2005–2008
- Succeeded by: Senator Alan Maclean

Senator
- In office November 2002 – June 2018
- Constituency: Jersey

Deputy
- In office December 1999 – November 2002
- Constituency: Saint Helier district 3 and 4
- Majority: 1,618 (24%)
- Website: www.ozouf.je

Philip Ozouf is a former Jersey politician. He was an independent member of the States Assembly from 1999 to 2018 and from 2022 to 2026.

During his political career, he held several ministerial offices, including Treasury and Resources Minister, Economic Development Minister, Minister for External Relations and Financial Services, and Assistant Chief Minister.

== Early life and education ==
Philip Francis Cyril Ozouf grew up in Jersey. He is the son of farmer and former Connétable of Saint Saviour Philip Francis Ozouf.

He was educated at Victoria College, Jersey, then attended the European Business School in London, Frankfurt and Paris; he gained a BA (Hons) International Business and French Equivalent. He also qualified to diploma stage of the Chartered Institute of Management Accountants. He describes himself as a "reasonably fluent" French, German and Spanish speaker.

== Electoral history ==
He was elected to the States of Jersey as a Deputy for Saint Helier District 3&4, in November 1999, topping the poll with 1,618 votes, a record number of votes in this district.

He was then elected a Senator in 2002, topping the poll with 14,442 votes. He was re-elected in 2008 in 5th position with 8,712 votes. He was re-elected a senator in 2014 with 10,062 votes.

He did not stand for re-election in the 2018 elections.

Ozouf stood for Deputy of St Saviour in the 2022 general election and won one of the five seats available with 1,000 votes. He did not contest the 2026 election.

== Ministerial positions ==
=== Economic development ===
From 2005 to 2008, Ozouf was Economic Development Minister in the Council of Ministers. This role had a wide remit, taking responsibility for subjects as varied as transport links, the Competition Law, the Rural Strategy. He was primarily tasked with achieving 2% real economic growth annually. This was something which has been recognised, even by his critics, as no small task. Ozouf was a strong supporter of the Goods and Sales Tax (GST), introduced on 6 May 2008 and initially levied at 3%.

In 2006, Ozouf was reprimanded for breaching procedure after he gave extra funding of £95,000 to Jersey's Battle of Flowers Association against the advice of his officers.

Ozouf was responsible for 'cleaning up' the Jersey fulfillment industry by preventing companies who sought to exploit the UK VAT threshold by establishing a Jersey mailbox. The move drew criticism from Deputy Geoff Southern, as Chair of the Economic Affairs scrutiny panel, however the move was welcomed by Jersey businesses.

=== Treasury ===
Between December 2008 and October 2014, Ozouf was Treasury Minister. He was proposed for the post by the Chief Minister, Terry Le Sueur, and received 38 votes, beating Deputy Geoff Southern who received 13 votes.

In 2012, Ozouf was the subject of criticism over the States of Jersey's failed plan to purchase Lime Grove House, an office building, for the intended use as a new police headquarters for the States of Jersey Police. Senator Sarah Ferguson lodged a vote of censure against Ozouf, which was later withdrawn. According to Ozouf the Lime Grove House building would have been unsuitable, and as an alternative, part of the adjacent Green Street public car park could be used as a site for a new police headquarters. In mid-2013 plans to build a new police building on part of Green Street car park were approved.

Ozouf, who is openly gay, supported the campaign for the introduction of a Civil Partnership law in Jersey, which the States Assembly passed in July 2011.

=== Assistant Chief Minister ===
From the October 2014 election Ozouf acted as Assistant Chief Minister with responsibility for Financial Services, Digital, Competition and Innovation matters, assuming full responsibility for Jersey's Innovation Fund at the beginning of 2016.

On 20 January 2017 the Chief Minister confirmed that he had received and accepted Ozouf's formal resignation from the post following publication of a report from the Auditor General criticising the way in which the Jersey Innovation Fund had lost a substantial part of the public funds entrusted to it.

=== Minister for External Relations ===
Ozouf served as Minister for External Relations in the Government led by Deputy Kristina Moore from 12 July 2022 until 30 January 2024 when Deputy Moore's administration left office following the vote of no confidence in her leadership.

== Criminal proceedings ==
During 2025, Ozouf was convicted in two separate criminal proceedings. In February, he pleaded guilty to speeding and driving without a valid insurance disc, for which he was fined £575 and had his licence endorsed. In October, he pleaded guilty to assisting unlawful immigration after arranging for foreign nationals to work at a laundry he owned. He was sentenced to 120 hours of community service. Following the conviction, the States Assembly voted to suspend him, and there were calls for his resignation. He did not stand in the 2026 general election.
