= The Art of Architecture =

- Title card
- Genre: Factual
- Directed by: Alastair Layzell
- Narrated by: Alastair Layzell
- Country of origin: United Kingdom
- No. of seasons: 3
- No. of episodes: 32

Production
- Executive producers: Jack Oliver; David Byrne
- Editor: Richard Hall
- Running time: 44 minutes
- Production company: Colonial Pictures

Original release
- Network: Sky Arts
- Release: 25 July 2019 – 13 June 2022

"The Art of Architecture" is a British factual documentary series broadcast in the United Kingdom on Sky Arts. It aired a first series in 2019, a second in 2021, and a third in 2022, as well as two specials in 2020. Each of its episodes makes a study of a piece of new architecture or restoration, showing how they were inspired, designed and brought to fruition, with a profile of the architect or firm which created it. The Art of Architecture is directed and narrated by Alastair Layzell and the architectural consultant is Marcus Binney.

The title was previously used for a mini-series of three episodes in 1960 presented by Kenneth Clark, entitled The Good Old Rules, The Age of the Spaceman and The Architecture We Deserve.

== Episodes ==
Episode	Original air date	Featured structure	Architect
1.1	25 July 2019	World Trade Center Transportation Hub	Santiago Calatrava
1.2	1 August 2019	Battersea Power Station redevelopment	Jim Eyre
1.3	8 August 2019	V&A Dundee	Kengo Kuma
1.4	15 August 2019	Vessel	Thomas Heatherwick
1.5	22 August 2019	Weston Tower, Westminster Abbey	Ptolemy Dean
1.6	29 August 2019	Macallan Distillery	Graham Stirk
1.7	5 September 2019	Smithsonian National Museum of African American History	David Adjaye
1.8	12 September 2019	Design Museum, Kensington	John Pawson
1.9	19 September 2019	John Simpson's house	John Simpson
1.10	26 September 2019	Alexandra Palace theatre restoration	Matt Somerville
Special	23 September 2020	Great Opera Houses of the World; La Fenice, Palau de les Arts Reina Sofía, Garsington Opera	Aldo Rossi, Santiago Calatrava, Robin Snell
Special	30 September 2020	Great Museums of the World; Museum of Arts and Sciences, Beyeler Foundation, Vitra Design Museum	Santiago Calatrava, Frank Gehry, Renzo Piano
2.1	5 February 2021	Bee'ah Headquarters, Sharjah	Zaha Hadid
2.2	12 February 2021	Cambridge Central Mosque	Marks Barfield
2.3	19 February 2021	Lambeth Palace Library and Archives	Wright & Wright
2.4	26 February 2021	New Music School, King's College School	Michael and Patty Hopkins
2.5	5 March 2021	Andermatt Concert Hall	Christina Seilern
2.6	9 March 2021	Island Rest, Hampshire	Magnus Strom
2.7	16 March 2021	Holy Trinity Church, Paris	Jean-Michel Wilmotte
2.8	23 March 2021	Southern Cross station, Melbourne	Nicholas Grimshaw
2.9	30 March 2021	Palais de Justice, Paris	Renzo Piano
2.10	7 April 2021	Expo 2020	Various
3.1	11 April 2022	Narbo Via, Narbonne	Norman Foster
3.2	18 April 2022	Holocaust Monument of Names, Amsterdam	Daniel Libeskind
3.3	25 April 2022	The Shed, New York City	Liz Diller
3.4	2 May 2022	House In The Cotswolds	Yiangou Architects
3.5	9 May 2022	Smith House, Nova Scotia	Brian McKay Lyons
3.6	16 May 2022	Wild Reindeer Pavilion, Norway	Kjetil Thorsen
3.7	23 May 2022	Serpentine Pavilion, London	Sumayya Valley
3.8	30 May 2022	Library at Magdalene College, Cambridge	Niall McLaughlin
3.9	6 June 2022	Neue Nationalgalerie, Berlin	David Chipperfield
3.10	13 June 2022	Dolunay Villa, Turkey	Foster+Partners
