= Pressure groups in Jersey =

Interest groups in Jersey politics

Pressure groups in Jersey are organisations, representative bodies, political movements and campaigns that seek to influence public policy, legislation or administrative decisions in Jersey without necessarily contesting elections as political parties. They operate within a small political system in which the States Assembly appoints ministers, makes laws, debates policy, approves taxation and public expenditure, and holds the Government of Jersey to account through scrutiny.

Jersey has traditionally had a weak party system, with most States Members elected as independents rather than as members of political parties. Following the 2026 Jersey general election, 42 of the 49 elected States Members were independents. In that context, pressure groups and organised interests may seek influence through direct contact with States Members, submissions to scrutiny reviews and government consultations, public campaigns, petitions, election manifestos and media advocacy.

== Political context ==
Pressure groups in Jersey operate in a small political system in which most elected representatives sit as independents and members of the public, campaigners and representative bodies may have relatively direct access to States Members. States Members undertake constituency or parish work and may be contacted directly by members of the public, organisations and campaigners. A 2026 proposition on lobbying guidance noted that States Members may be approached through constituency meetings, drop-ins, letters, emails, scheduled meetings and other forms of contact, including by people representing the interests of groups of individuals.

Pressure groups should be distinguished from registered political parties, statutory bodies and states-owned entities and arm's-length bodies. The boundary is not always clear. Some organisations are primarily representative bodies, some are temporary single-issue campaigns, and some political movements, such as Value Jersey, may endorse candidates or issue policy programmes without registering as political parties.

== Business and sectoral organisations ==
Some of Jersey's most visible pressure-group activity comes from business and sectoral representative bodies. The Jersey Chamber of Commerce describes itself as the island's largest independent business membership organisation and says that it seeks to ensure members' views are heard in government through committees and lobbying work. Ahead of the 2026 general election, the Chamber and the Jersey branch of the Institute of Directors jointly published a manifesto calling on incoming political leaders to adopt a long-term programme on economic resilience, social wellbeing and competitiveness.

The finance sector has particular significance in Jersey's economy. Jersey Finance is the main body promoting Jersey's financial services industry internationally; the Government of Jersey's financial services policy framework describes it as the industry's promotional body. Jersey Finance is not simply a private pressure group: it has member firms from across the finance industry, but also operates as an arm's-length organisation receiving public funding as well as industry support. Other finance-sector bodies represent particular parts of the industry, including the Jersey Funds Association, which represents Jersey's funds industry and works with members, regulators and government on the development and promotion of the island's funds sector.

Other sectoral bodies have also sought to influence policy. The Jersey Hospitality Association has published election manifestos and called on government to work with the industry on issues such as work permits, visitor accommodation and the future of the visitor economy. Other organised interests in this category include agricultural, retail, landlord, and professional representative bodies.

== Civic and campaign organisations ==
Civic and campaign organisations in Jersey have focused on issues including the environment, planning, heritage, housing, equality and human rights.

Environmental campaigning has included groups such as CONCERN which campaigned on population control, and SOS Jersey, which has campaigned on coastal protection, pollution, planning and the need for environmental regulation.

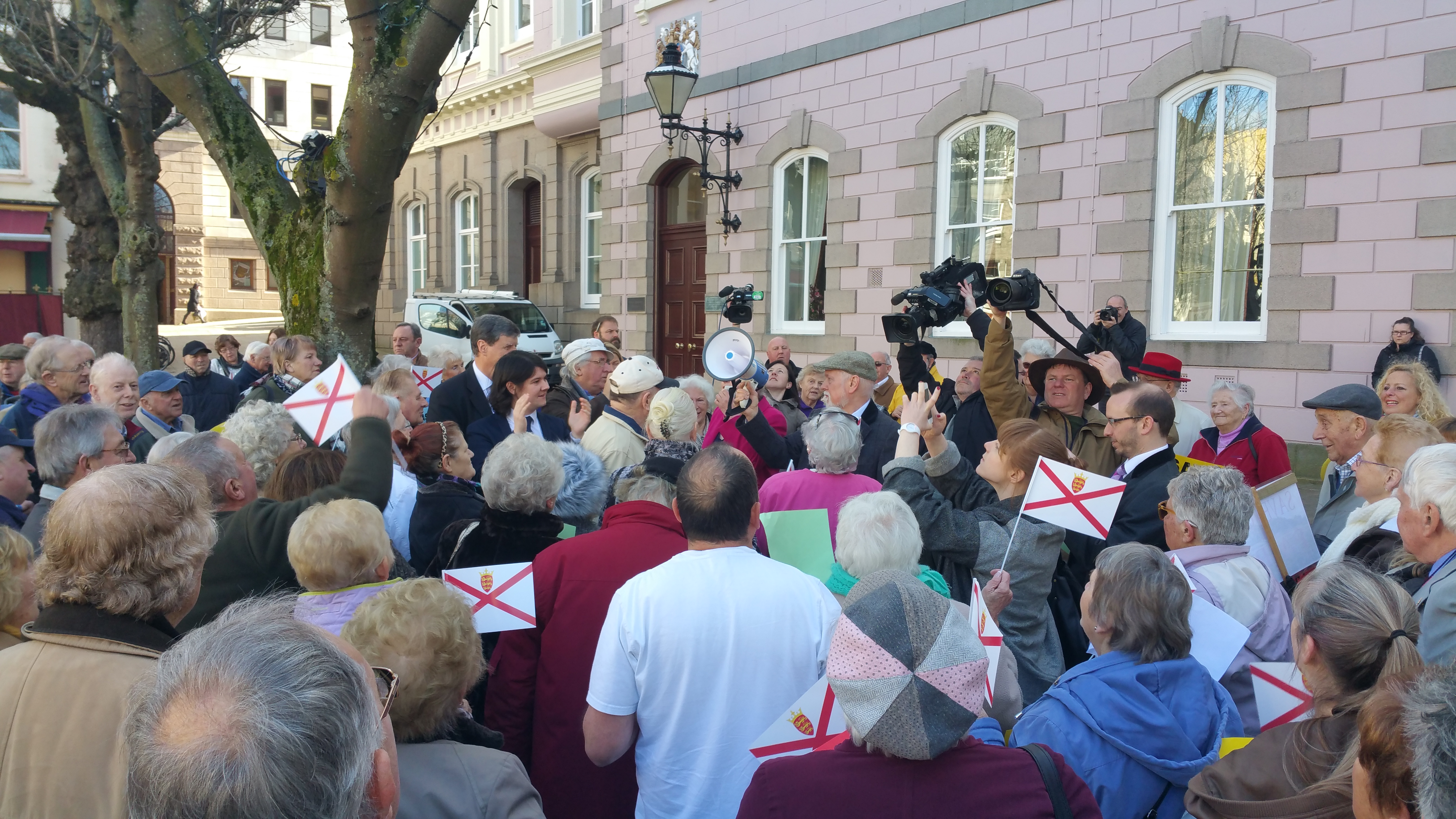
Campaigners opposing the use of People's Park as a site for Jersey's new hospital gathered in the Royal Square in 2016.

Heritage and planning campaigns have included Save Jersey's Heritage, which has objected to demolition or redevelopment proposals affecting historic buildings and has submitted alternative planning proposals in some cases. The Société Jersiaise and the National Trust for Jersey are better understood as cultural, heritage and environmental organisations, but may also contribute to public debates where heritage, conservation or planning policy is involved.

Rights and equality campaigning in Jersey has included human rights, anti-discrimination, LGBTQ+, disability and gender-based violence issues. The Jersey Human Rights Group is an independent civic organisation that has been chaired by non-ministerial States Assembly members. Earlier rights-based campaigning included the Jersey Rights Association, which submitted evidence to scrutiny on police use of Tasers, and the Jersey Youth Reform Team, which made submissions during the 2006 review of the age of consent.

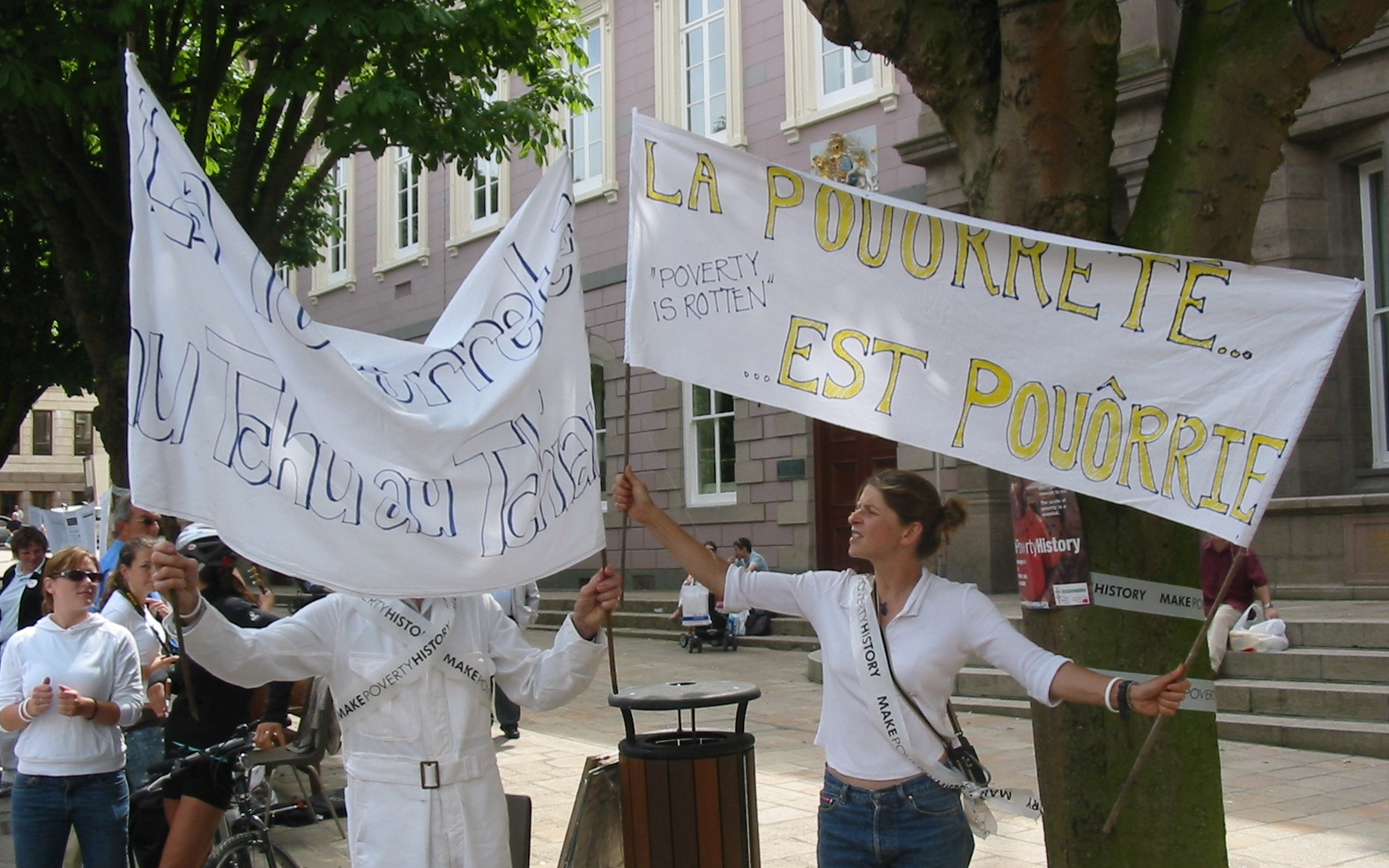
A Make Poverty History event in the Royal Square in 2005, with a bilingual English and Jèrriais banner.

Equality campaigning has also included Liberate, which describes itself as the Channel Islands' equality and diversity charity, and its partner organisation Trans* Jersey. Liberate and Trans* Jersey were active in debates on same-sex marriage and gender identity, including submissions on the Marriage and Civil Status Law and the sex discrimination consultation. Disability-related representation has included the Jersey Disability Partnership, whose views were recorded in the consultation process leading to disability discrimination regulations.

Jersey organisations have also participated in international campaigns; in 2005, a coalition including schools, faith groups, trade unions and international-development organisations supported the Make Poverty History campaign.

The Jersey Community Relations Trust is a related but different type of body: it was established by the States Assembly in 2004 to seek to eliminate discrimination in Jersey, so is better treated as a States-established equality body rather than as an ordinary independent pressure group.

Campaigning and policy work on violence against women and girls has involved specialist support organisations as well as government and public bodies. FREEDA, formerly Jersey Women's Refuge, describes itself as Jersey's only exclusively independent domestic abuse charity, with a mission to protect and empower women and prevent domestic abuse. Such organisations are primarily service providers, but may also contribute to wider public-policy debates where rights, equality and protection from violence are concerned.

== Religious and moral-issue campaigning ==
Religious organisations and faith leaders have also contributed to public-policy debates in Jersey, particularly on moral and social issues. The Dean of Jersey, as head of the Anglican Church in Jersey and chaplain to the States Assembly, has the right to speak in the Assembly but not to vote. Religious groups and leaders have also made submissions or public interventions outside the Assembly.

Faith-based campaigning has been visible in debates on sexual ethics, marriage and end-of-life law. In 2006, the Corporate Services Scrutiny Panel reviewed proposals to equalise the age of consent for homosexual and heterosexual sexual activity. In 2017, religious organisations including Quennevais Evangelical Church, the Jersey Evangelical Alliance and the Roman Catholic Deanery made submissions or gave evidence during Scrutiny consideration of same-sex marriage legislation.

Religious opposition has also featured in the assisted dying debate. In 2022, Bishop Philip Egan, the Roman Catholic Bishop of Portsmouth, wrote to Catholic clergy and parishioners in Jersey asking them to oppose proposals to legalise assisted dying and to raise the issue with candidates during the election campaign. Faith-based and secular organisations have taken positions on both sides of such debates, so religious interventions are best understood as one part of wider public argument rather than as a separate electoral force.

== Political movements and election campaigning ==
Jersey politics has included organisations that occupy the boundary between pressure groups, political movements and formal political parties. In 2026, the Jersey Electoral Authority stated that Jersey law contains no statutory definition of a "political movement". For election-law purposes, whether an organisation is treated as a political party depends on whether it is registered under the Political Parties (Registration) (Jersey) Law 2008. The guidance explained that election expenses may be treated differently depending on whether they are incurred by a candidate, with a candidate's express or implied consent, or by a third party. It also noted that a voluntary code for political groups had been introduced, but that the Authority had no regulatory powers to enforce non-compliance with that code for the 2026 elections.

The distinction became prominent before the 2026 Jersey general election, when Value Jersey described itself as a political movement rather than a political party. ITV News reported that, on that basis, the movement was not subject to political-party or third-party expenditure limits, although questions were raised about funding transparency and the support provided to candidates who endorsed its policies.

== Think tanks and policy discussion ==
Jersey has also had organisations concerned principally with policy research, civic engagement and informed public discussion rather than campaigning for a fixed political programme. The Jersey Policy Forum (JPF), established in 2015, organised conferences, surveys and public-engagement projects on social, economic and governmental issues. Ahead of the 2022 Jersey general election, JPF published The Future We Want, drawing on a survey of several hundred islanders about Jersey’s social, economic and environmental priorities following the COVID-19 pandemic.

Policy Centre Jersey (PCJ) was launched as a separate independent think tank in 2023. It undertakes research, publishes policy briefings and convenes discussions intended to improve knowledge and civic participation. At its launch, the Centre said that it intended to collaborate with existing organisations including the Jersey Policy Forum. Reports by PCJ have called for government to develop a long term strategy for energy production and consumption, examined the implications of falling birth rates, and critiqued the Government of Jersey's approach to public consultations.

Although such bodies may influence policy through research and recommendations, they are generally distinguished from organisations formed primarily to advocate a particular interest or policy position.

== Lobbying regulation and transparency ==
Jersey does not have a general statutory register of lobbying of States Members. In 2026, the States Assembly Privileges and Procedures Committee lodged a proposition to approve lobbying guidance, a voluntary engagement code for elected States Members and an associated lobbying register. The proposed register was intended to create a public record of organisations seeking to influence States Members and to improve transparency and public trust. The proposition was rejected by the States Assembly on 26 March 2026 by 14 votes to 30.

== See also ==
- Politics of Jersey
- Political parties in Jersey
- Elections in Jersey
- States Assembly
- Pressure groups in the United Kingdom
- Government of Jersey
- Jersey Electoral Authority
