= Trevor Pitman =

Jersey politician

Trevor Mark Pitman

Deputy
- In office 2011–2013
- Constituency: St Helier No. 1
- Majority: 763 (42%)

Deputy
- In office Dec 2008 – 2011
- Constituency: St Helier No. 1
- Majority: 487

Personal details
- Born: Jersey
- Spouse: Shona Pitman
- Website: http://www.thebaldtruthjersey.co.uk/

Trevor Mark Pitman is a Jersey politician who was first elected as a Deputy for St Helier in the Jersey general election of 2008.

== Polictal career ==
Pitman was elected as a Deputy for the parish of St Helier in 2008. At this time he was one of the Jersey Democratic Alliance's candidates.

After losing a libel action regarding a satirical cartoon, Deputy Pitman was declared bankrupt in January 2013, which meant that he automatically lost his seat in the Assembly of the States of Jersey.
