= Paul Le Claire =

Jersey musician and politician

Paul Vincent Le Claire

Deputy
- In office December 2005 – November 2011
- Preceded by: Jerry Dorey
- Constituency: St Helier District No. 1

Senator
- In office December 1999 – November 2005
- Preceded by: Terry Le Main
- Succeeded by: Ben Shenton

Personal details
- Born: 1963 (age 62–63) Jersey
- Spouse: Natalia
- Children: Two
- Website: http://www.paulleclaire.com/

Paul Vincent Le Claire (born 1963) is a Jersey politician who was a member of the States of Jersey from 1999 to 2011. He represented the Saint Helier District No.1 constituency and between 1999 and 2005 had an island-wide mandate as a senator.

== Biography ==
He was born in 1963 in Jersey.

== Electoral history ==
Le Claire first stood in a by-election for a vacant senatorial seat in a by-election held in February 1999, coming second to Jerry Dorey with 1,811 votes. In a subsequent by-election in April 1999, he was, however, successful in gaining one of the three seats as a deputy for St Helier No.1 District.

Later that year, Le Claire again sought an island-wide mandate as senator. He was elected in the October 1999 general election, coming fourth with 8,287 votes in a contest for six seats. In 2005 he was a founder member of the Jersey Democratic Alliance, but following the resignation of Senator Ted Vibert as chairman and the subsequent election of a more left-leaning leadership, he resigned to lead the Centre Party. In the October 2005 elections he polled ninth of fifteen candidates and failed to gain re-election as a senator. Following the election he announced that he was resigning his membership of the Centre Party.

Le Claire turned his attentions again to the St Helier No.1 District constituency, where he stood successfully as an independent in the 2005 and 2008 Deputies elections. In the 2011 general elections he failed to retain his seat, finishing fourth out of eight candidates.
