= Alastair Layzell =

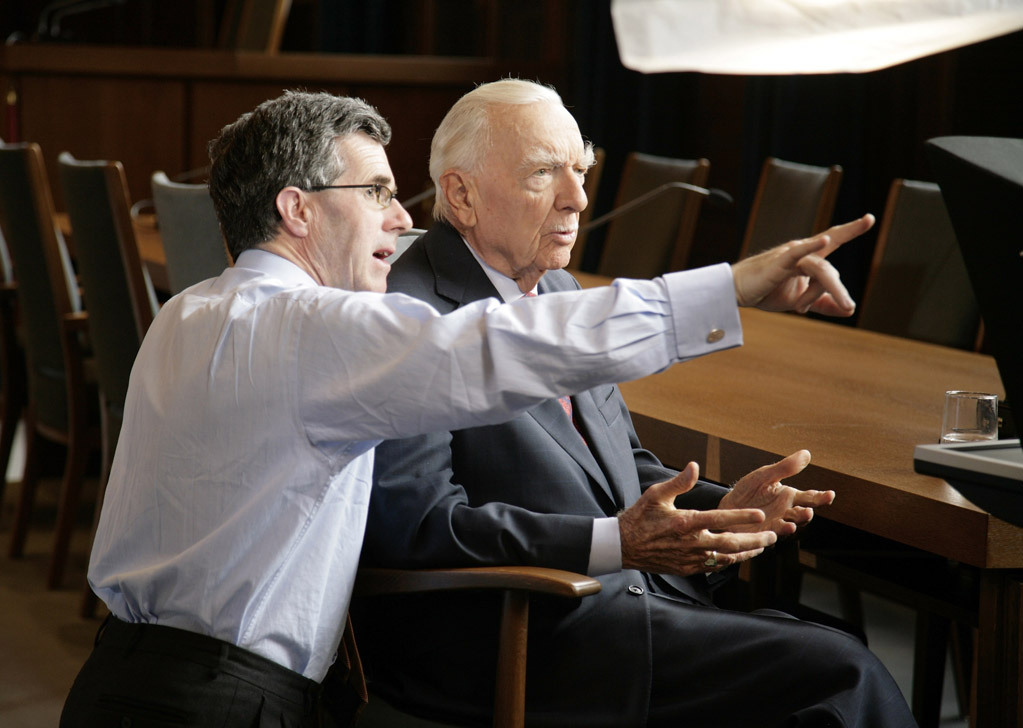
- Alastair Layzell and veteran CBS newsman Walter Cronkite, Nuremberg 2007, for the ITV series Legacy of War
- Born: 28 June 1958 (age 68); Jersey, Channel Islands
- Occupation: Television Producer
- Website: colonialpictures.co.uk

Alastair Layzell (born 28 June 1958) is an independent television producer who started his career as a reporter for Channel Television (the ITV contractor in the Channel Islands) and later served nine years as a deputy of the States of Jersey, becoming President of the Home Affairs Committee, President of the Jersey Transport Authority and Vice-president of the Planning & Environment Committee.

== Biography ==
Layzell was born and educated in Jersey at Victoria College Preparatory and then at Hautlieu School. He helped found the island's hospital radio service, in 1975, as a presenter and later producer of the weekly political programme Midweek. In 1977 he joined Channel Television as a junior reporter, then continuity announcer, before returning to the newsroom as a journalist. He produced and directed a number of documentaries for the ITV network including Summer 1940 (the story of the German occupation of the Channel Islands), Around Britain and The Dakota: 1935–1985 marking the fiftieth anniversary of the first flight of the Douglas DC3 airliner. From 1980 he was a regular presenter of the nightly news programme Channel Report and anchored the station's coverage of the Budget and general elections.

In 1988, he left Channel Television to form Colonial American which, through its trading arm Colonial Pictures, has become one of Britain's top 150 independent production companies (source: Broadcast Magazine annual survey). As producer and director his early credits included The Only Way to Cross: 150 years of Cunard (for ITV), The Best of Europe (for Discovery Channel USA) and Mansion: Great Houses of Europe – a series of forty programmes with Marcus Binney, architecture correspondent of The Times.

More recently he has written, produced and directed Art Deco Designs and In Search of Style – both with the actress Maureen Lipman – for UKTV and ITV, The Flying Picnic (with Annabel Croft) for ITV Anglia and Sky Travel, Garden Makers (presented by Joe Swift) London Visions with Peter Ackroyd (ITV/Sky Arts), and Peter Ackroyd's Venice (Sky Arts). He directed City at War and Legacy of War (ITV/PBS) jointly presented by veteran CBS newsman Walter Cronkite and ITV News anchor Alastair Stewart. The first of these looks at the reporting of the Second World War by correspondents such as Edward R Murrow, the second examines the post-war re-construction of Europe and the onset of the Cold War. For Discovery Channel he produced Britain's Greatest Ships (the story of the new Cunard liner Queen Elizabeth) and for Sky Arts the long-running series Auction. His latest work is in 3D. For Sky 3D he produced and directed Treasure Houses of Britain with Selina Scott, showcasing Blenheim Palace, Chatsworth, Boughton House, Holkham Hall and Burghley House.

In 1990 he joined Marcus Binney, President of Save Britain's Heritage, to save Jersey's Government House from demolition. After a campaign which included a 10,000-strong petition and support from the Queen Mother and the Prince of Wales, the decision was overturned by the States and the house re-furbished. In 1991 he and Marcus Binney and Advocate Christopher Scholefield formed Save Jersey's Heritage to fight for the preservation of the island's built heritage. Among their successful campaigns was the restoration of a row of 18th century cottages in the capital, St Helier.

Layzell directed and narrated the series The Art of Architecture for Sky Arts from 2019, working again with Binney, who was architectural consultant.

=== Political career ===
He entered the States of Jersey in 1993 as a deputy for the parish of St Brelade on an environmental manifesto Notre Ile: A Charter for Change. Among his first speeches was an alternative 'green budget' proposed on Budget Day 1994. As vice-president of the Planning & Environment Committee for six years he helped introduce a new planning law and Island Plan. As president of the Jersey Transport Authority he helped draw up the Service Level Agreement governing the operation of the island's principal sea routes and represented the island in negotiations to protect Jersey's so-called 'lifeline' air routes. As president of the Home Affairs Committee he steered updated legislation through the States including a new terrorism law, a revised firearms law (in the wake of the Dunblane killings) and a Police and Criminal Evidence law.

In 2002 he failed to be re-elected in St Brelade, losing out to political newcomer Sarah Ferguson by 34 votes. In February 2003 he contested a by-election for Senator (an island-wide mandate) but lost out by 200 votes to Ted Vibert. In 2006 he was one of the founding members of the St Aubin Anti-Reclamation Group which opposes plans to reclaim land from the sea for a car park in his old parish of St Brelade.

=== Aviation ===
He has had a lifelong interest in aviation. In 1972 he wrote (with Michael de la Haye) Sixty Glorious Years: the History of Aviation in Jersey and, in 1987, Announcing the Arrival – to mark the fiftieth anniversary of the opening of Jersey Airport. He led a group of enthusiasts who bought, at auction in 1990, a four-engined de Havilland Heron formerly owned by Jersey Airlines. It now flies from its former home-base. In 1996 he founded the National Air Pageant and, as chairman, led the campaign to prevent the world's last airworthy de Havilland Comet Canopus being sold overseas. It was saved for the nation by Defence Secretary Michael Portillo and now lies at Bruntingthorpe in Leicestershire.
