= Ted Vibert =

Jersey politician

Ted Vibert was a politician in the States of Jersey from 1999 to 2005.

== Biography ==
Ted Vibert was born on 10 June 1938, at Grosnez, St Ouen, Jersey.

He went to the States Intermediate school, then was one of the first intake to Hautlieu School. He gained the Howard Davis Scholarship to University of Southampton.

He played football professionally for three years for Leyton Orient in London. He then went to Australia in 1969, and ran several commercial ventures there.

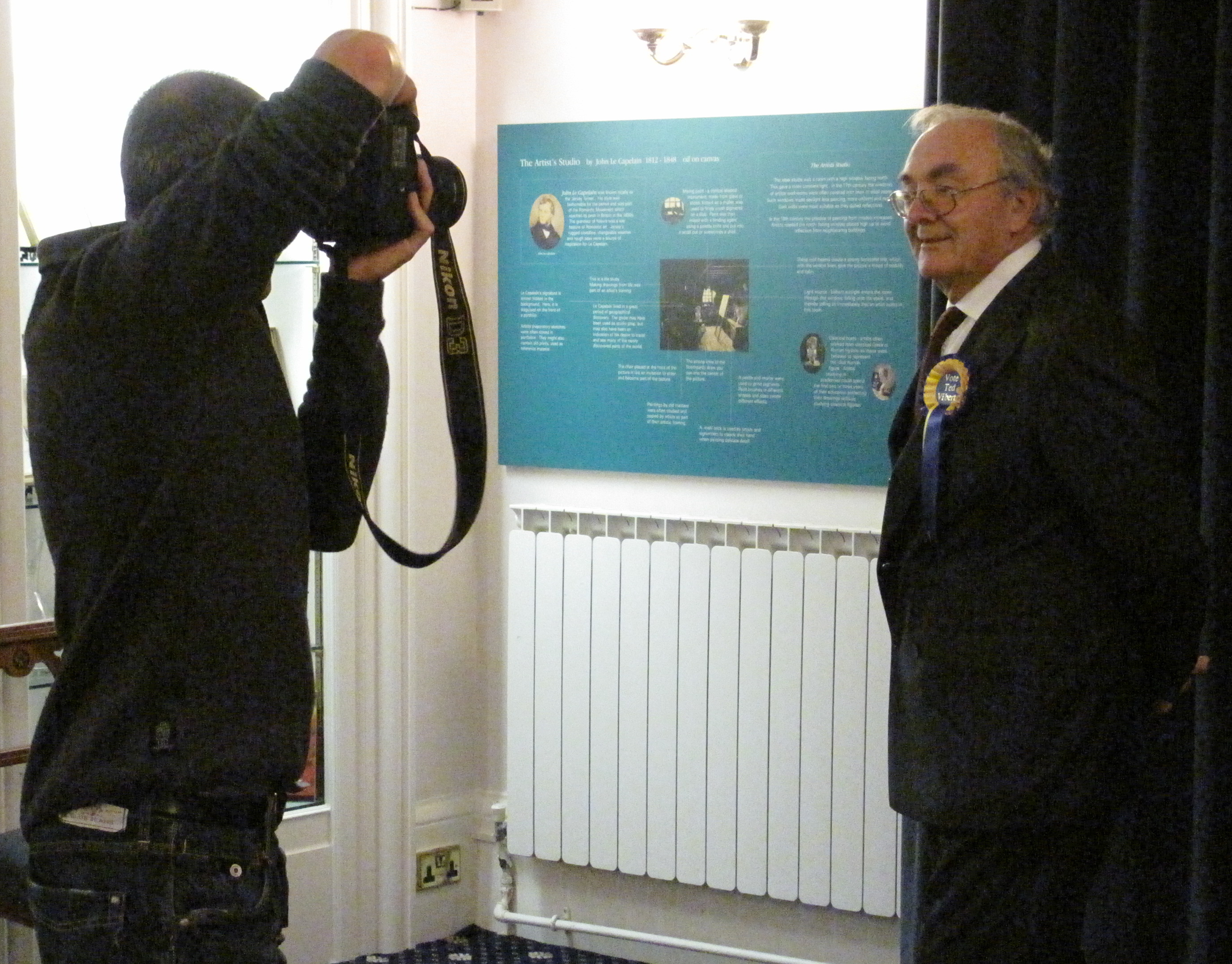
Ted Vibert being photographed by media following nomination as candidate for Deputy, Saint Helier 3&4, 7 September 2011

He returned to Jersey in July 1999, and stood for Deputy of St Helier No 1 District, gained a seat there (3rd place with 411 votes), but stood down at the 2002 elections, citing ill health. In 2003, he stood in the Senatorial by-election created by the sudden resignation of former Senator Ann Bailhache. He stood on a populist platform, saying that "It is obvious that there are two factions in the States those with a social conscience and those with none at all. I want to help redress the balance against those with a ‘gung-ho’ mentality who want to see more population, more building and more business activity.". He was elected a Senator, with 3,983 votes, after he narrowly beat former Deputy Alastair Layzell (3,712 votes).

He was active as a driving force in the formation and leadership of the Jersey Democratic Alliance, but ill health forced him to retire from the States in the 2005 Elections. In 2011, he resigned from the party.

He stood unsuccessfully as an independent in the St Helier District No. 3 constituency in the 2011 elections, coming seventh out of eight candidates for the four vacant seats.
