= Geoff Southern =

Jersey politician

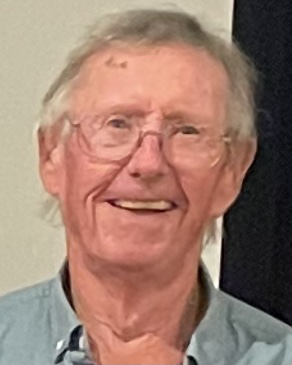
- Southern in 2024

Deputy
- Incumbent
- Assumed office February 2002
- Constituency: St Helier District 2
- Majority: 628

Personal details
- Born: Manchester, England
- Party: Reform Jersey since 2014
- Spouse: Anne Southern
- Children: Two
- Occupation: Teacher
- Website: http://www.geoffsouthern.com/

Geoff Southern is a former Jersey politician and teacher. He served as a deputy in the States Assembly, representing constituencies in St Helier from 2002 to 2026, when he did not stand for re-election.

He was a member of two left-leaning political parties: the Jersey Democratic Alliance and, later, Reform Jersey.

== Biography ==
Southern was born in Manchester. He graduated from the University of Surrey with a BSc (Hons) Metallurgy and French and had a career as a school teacher at Hautlieu School Jersey and as a homeless support worker. He is a former president of the Jersey branch of the National Union of Teachers. He is a fan of the American singer-songwriter Tom Waits.

== States of Jersey ==
Southern served as a backbench member of the States Assembly and did not hold ministerial office. He chaired the Economic Affairs Scrutiny Panel from 2005 to 2008, the Health, Social Security and Housing Scrutiny Panel from 2010 to 2011, and the Health and Social Security Scrutiny Panel from 2022 to 2023.

He was a member of the executive committee of the Jersey branch of the Assemblée parlementaire de la Francophonie.

== Electoral history ==
Southern unsuccessfully contested elections to the States Assembly in 1996 before being elected as Deputy for Saint Helier No. 2 in a by-election on 15 February 2002. He was re-elected in 2002, 2005, 2008, 2011, 2014, 2018 and 2022.

He also unsuccessfully stood for Senator in 2005 and 2010.

In 2009 he and another deputy in the same constituency (Shona Pitman), were charged with breaching Article 39A of the Public Elections (Jersey) Law 2002, which prohibits a candidate or representative from interfering with a person's application for registration to vote, during the November 2008 election. Southern had opposed the introduction of this law when it was debated in the States assembly in 2008, saying that he would "continue to assist people who ask me to help them fill in the form … I am among those who may well be prosecuted under the bureaucratic nonsense of a piece of law". On 20 February 2009, Southern pleaded guilty in Magistrate's Court to breaking the law "by assisting about 70 elderly, infirm or busy people to complete a postal vote application form in the election and/or delivering their completed forms" and he was committed to the Royal Court for sentencing. In mitigation his advocate submitted that the law infringed the human rights of the disabled and infirm to take part in the electoral process and the debate on Article 39A in the States had been flawed. Southern was sentenced to a fine of £10,000 (or twenty weeks' imprisonment in default).

== Party politics ==
In 2005, Southern was a founding member and later leader of the Jersey Democratic Alliance. Southern stood as an independent in the 2011 elections and the party was wound up shortly afterwards.

Southern went on to be a founder member of Reform Jersey in 2014.

== See also ==
- Elections in Jersey
- Political parties in Jersey
- Politics of Jersey
