= Shona Pitman =

Jersey politician

Deputy
- In office 2011–2014
- Constituency: St Helier No. 2
- Majority: 743 (44%)

Deputy
- In office Dec 2008 – 2011
- Constituency: St Helier No. 2
- Majority: 598

Deputy
- In office 2005–2008
- Constituency: St Helier No. 2
- Majority: 625

Personal details
- Spouse: Trevor Pitman

Shona Pitman is a former Jersey politician who was first elected as a Deputy for St Helier in the Jersey general election of 2005. She lost her seat in January 2014 after being declared bankrupt.
