= Sarah Ferguson (politician) =

Jersey politician (c.1942–2022)

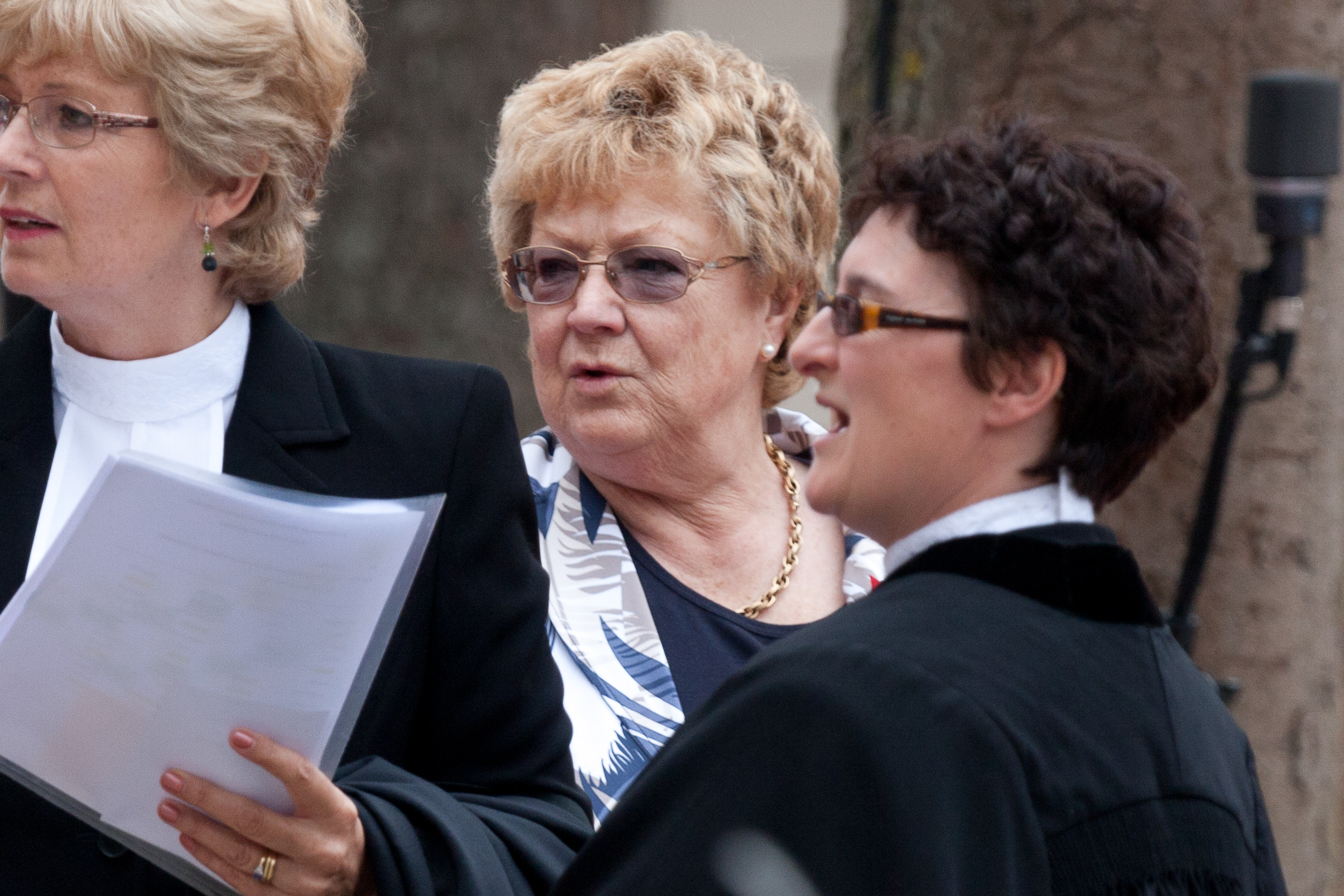
- Ferguson (centre) in 2012

Senator of Jersey
- In office September 2016 – June 2022
- Preceded by: Zoe Cameron

Senator of Jersey
- In office December 2008 – November 2014

Deputy for St Brelade No. 1
- In office December 2002 – December 2008

Personal details
- Born: c. 1942 near Manchester, England
- Died: 13 September 2022 Jersey
- Party: Independent
- Education: University of Manchester; Columbia Business School
- Occupation: Engineer, financial services professional

Sarah Craig Ferguson (c. 1942 – 13 September 2022) was a Jersey politician who served in the States Assembly from 2002 to 2014 and again from 2016 to 2022. She was first elected as a Deputy for St Brelade and subsequently served three terms as an island-wide Senator.

Ferguson's political work was concentrated on parliamentary scrutiny. She chaired the Corporate Services Scrutiny Panel, served as president of the Chairmen's Committee—the body responsible for co-ordinating the Assembly's scrutiny panels—from 2008 to 2011, and chaired the Public Accounts Committee during two periods of her political career.

== Early life and career ==
Ferguson was born near Manchester and attended Penrhos College in Colwyn Bay. She studied electrical engineering at the University of Manchester and undertook an engineering apprenticeship in the heavy-transformer division of AEG. She later completed a Master of Business Administration at Columbia Business School in New York, specialising in finance and accountancy.

Before entering politics, Ferguson worked in engineering, retail and financial services. She was employed as an investment analyst and auditor before joining the Jersey Financial Services Commission, where she worked in compliance and banking supervision. She also served in the Honorary Police of St Brelade, initially as a Constable's Officer and later as a Centenier.

== Political career ==
Ferguson was first elected to the States Assembly in December 2002 as a Deputy for St Brelade No. 1 and was re-elected in 2005. Under Jersey's former committee system she served on the Health and Social Services Committee and was shadow chair of the Public Accounts Committee. Following the introduction of ministerial government, she became chair of the Corporate Services Scrutiny Panel.

She was elected as a Senator in the island-wide election in 2008. From 2008 to 2011 she served as president of the Chairmen's Committee, the predecessor of the Scrutiny Liaison Committee. In that capacity she led the committee responsible for co-ordinating the work of the Assembly's scrutiny panels.

Ferguson lost her seat at the 2014 Jersey general election, finishing ninth when eight senatorial seats were available. She requested a recount, but the result was unchanged and she remained behind the eighth-placed candidate, Philip Ozouf.

She returned to the Assembly in September 2016 after winning a by-election for the seat vacated by Zoe Cameron. Ferguson received 3,649 votes, defeating Deputy Sam Mézec by 131 votes. She was re-elected as a Senator at the 2018 Jersey general election.

Following the 2018 election, Ferguson was elected chair of the Public Accounts Committee. She stepped down from the position in October 2020 because of ill health but remained a member of the Assembly until retiring at the 2022 Jersey general election.

Ferguson was particularly associated with scrutiny of public finances and government administration. She also regularly raised issues affecting older people and the protection of St Brelade's Bay from development.

== Community activities and death ==
Outside the Assembly, Ferguson served as chair of Age Concern Jersey. She was also involved with the St Brelade's Bay Association, the Jersey Lifeboat Association and the Jersey Society for the Prevention of Cruelty to Animals.

Ferguson died at Jersey Hospice on 13 September 2022, aged 80. Tributes following her death highlighted her scrutiny work and her advocacy for older islanders.
