= Mike Vibert =

Jersey politician, teacher and journalist

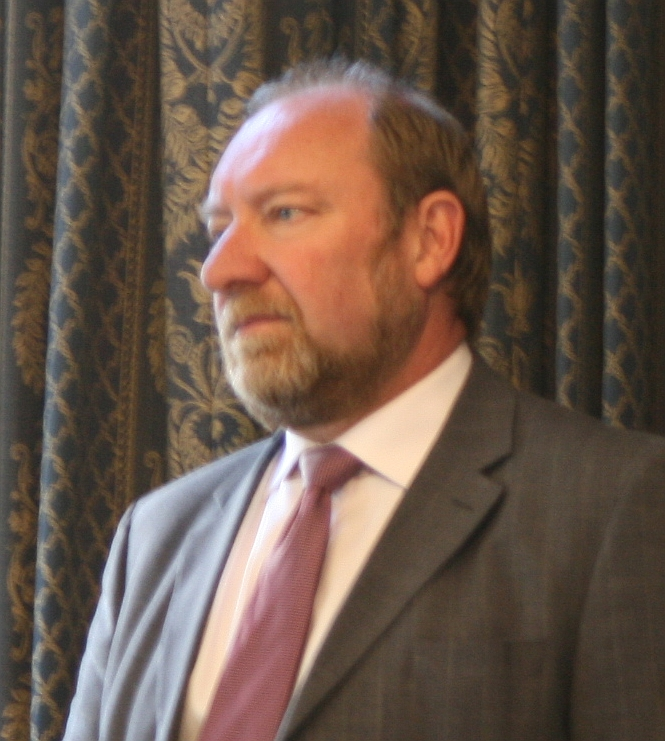

Senator
- In office 2002–2008
- Constituency: Jersey
- Majority: 10,624

Deputy
- In office 1999–2002
- Constituency: St Brélade No. 2
- Majority: 1,202

Deputy
- In office 1996–1999
- Constituency: St Brélade No. 2
- Majority: 865

Personal details
- Born: 1950
- Died: 15 January 2011 (aged 60–61) Jersey
- Occupation: Teacher; Journalist

Mike Vibert (1950 – 15 January 2011) was a teacher, Jersey politician, and the island's Minister for Education, Sport and Culture from 2005 until 2008.

He has been past president of the Jersey Teachers Association, past vice-chairman of St Brelade's Youth Club Management Committee, Procureur du Bien Public de la Commune de la Moye.

== Education ==
Vibert was educated at Les Landes School and Hautlieu. He then trained as a teacher at College of St Mark & St John (which was then in London). He moved from teaching to journalism, and gained a National Council for the Training of Journalists Post-graduate Certificate in Journalism (Sheffield).

== Journalism ==
In Jersey, after three years working at the Jersey Evening Post he became one of the four founding members of staff of BBC Radio Jersey at its inception, becoming the first news editor and then assistant editor. He provided commentary for broadcasts of States sittings. After being made redundant from BBC Radio Jersey in 1995 he became editor of Inside Jersey, a colour news magazine.

== Political career ==
Elected in 1996 as Deputy for the Parish of St Brélade, No. 2 district (865 votes) and re-elected 1999 (1,202 votes). During this time, he actively worked towards the creation of Les Creux Country Park, near Beauport bay.

Elected in 2002 as Senator (in fourth place with 10,624 votes).

In the 2008 Jersey general election, held on 15 October 2008, he lost his Senatorial seat.

Within the States, he held the office of president of Sport, Leisure and Recreation committee and while also serving as the President of the Special Committee on the Composition and Election of the States.

== Community work ==
In early 2010 he became vice-chairman of the Jersey Allotment and Leisure Gardening Association (JALGA) becoming instrumental in establishing the very first public allotments at Les Creux in St. Brélade, his home parish.

== See also ==
- Council of Ministers of Jersey
