= Frank Walker (Jersey politician) =

Jersey politician and businessman (born 1943)

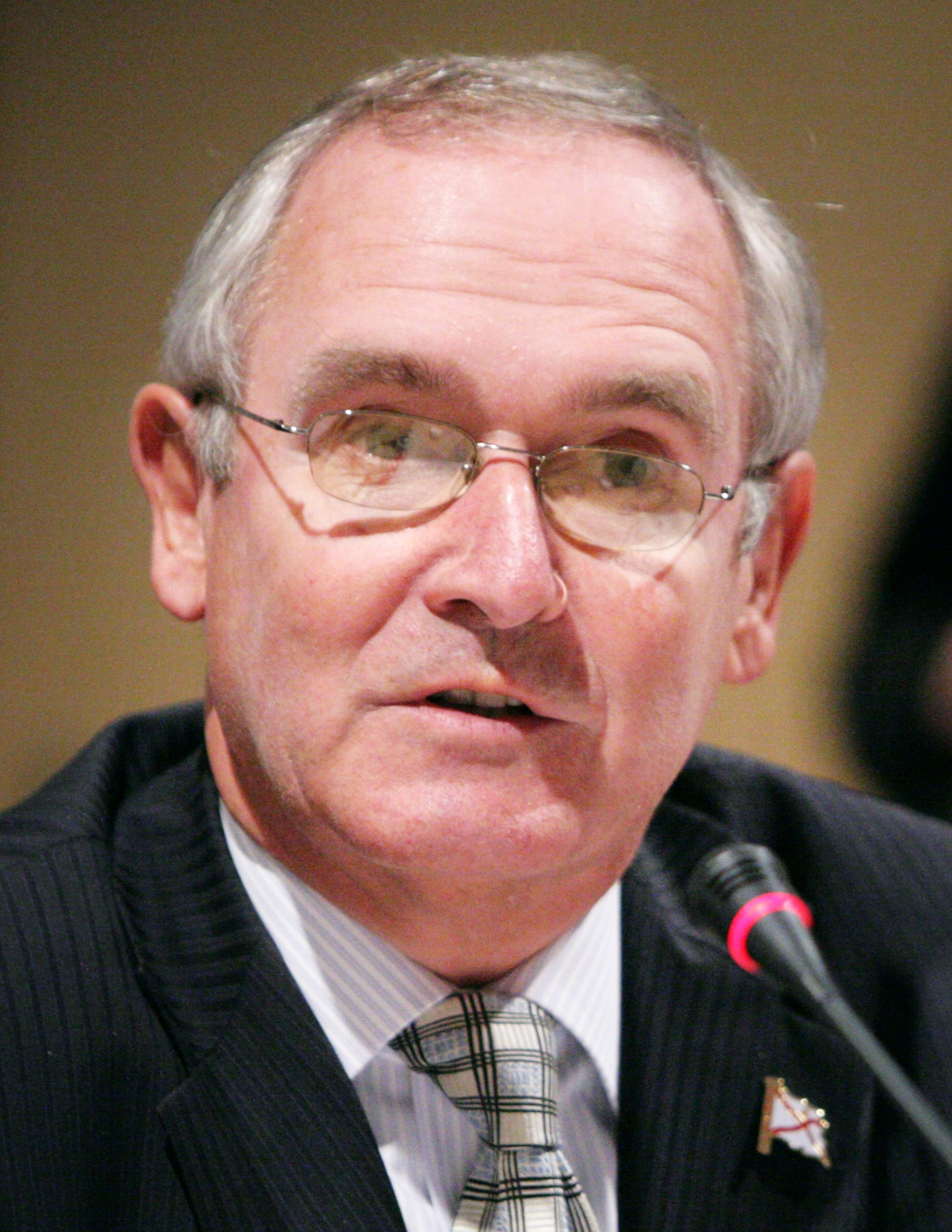
- Walker in 2008

1st Chief Minister of Jersey
- In office 8 December 2005 – 12 December 2008
- Monarch: Elizabeth II
- Lieutenant Governor: John Cheshire; Andrew Ridgway
- Preceded by: Office established
- Succeeded by: Terry Le Sueur

Senator
- In office December 1996 – December 2008

Deputy
- In office December 1990 – December 1996

Personal details
- Born: Frank Harrison Walker Jersey
- Spouse: Fiona Walker (formerly Spurr)
- Occupation: Businessperson

Frank Harrison Walker OBE is a former British newspaper publisher on the island of Jersey who became the first Chief Minister of Jersey, serving from 2005 to 2008.

== Career outside politics ==
In 1973, at the age of 29, Walker became managing director of, and acquired a major shareholding in, W. E Guiton & Co. Ltd., the parent company of the Jersey Evening Post, the Island's only daily newspaper. In 1978 the newspaper moved to new custom designed premises and installed the latest print and typesetting technology. Over the next two decades the newspaper grew its readership, substantially increased advertising revenues and recorded steady increases in profit. The company diversified into print, travel, retailing and IT and became the Guiton Group, which was floated on the Alternative Investment Market of the London Stock Exchange. In 1990 Walker stood down as group managing director and took over the chairmanship of the group. Shortly thereafter he led the team that acquired the Guernsey Evening Press, the only daily newspaper in Guernsey. The group was sold, in February 2005, to the family who own the Wolverhampton Express & Star and other titles and businesses in the West Midlands. Upon the completion of the sale Walker severed all connections with the company.

== Political record ==
Walker was first elected to the States Assembly, the Island's Parliament, on 13 December 1990 as Deputy of St Helier No 3 District and topped the poll when he was re-elected in 1993; he was then elected as Senator, with an Island-wide mandate, in 1996 and re-elected in December 2002, at which time he stated that this would be his final term of office. Walker did not stand for re-election in 2008.

During his political career Walker held numerous committee presidencies including Jersey Post, the Finance and Economics Committee and the Policy and Resources Committee. He was elected Jersey's first Chief Minister in 2005.

While a Senator, Walker was the subject of rumours that he was a "serial wife-beater" and also that he abused his office by receiving "improper and corrupt inducements". These allegations were never tested in a court of law. However, in 2001, Walker took legal action against a Jersey accountant and the then head of the Honorary Police for spreading these rumours. The case was settled out of court, with the two paying Walker's legal and other costs and taking out a full-page advertisement in the local paper to apologise unreservedly for their actions. The advertisement also carried an unreserved apology from one of the men for falsely accusing Walker of accepting financial inducements from a development company.

When Walker left office Jersey had assumed responsibility for its own international affairs, previously undertaken by the United Kingdom Government, negotiated a number of Tax Information Exchange Agreements with EU and OECD member states, introduced a new form of indirect taxation, together with a new co-ordinated income support scheme for the less well-off, and Jersey had a balanced budget, no debt and substantial cash reserves.

In February 2008, allegations were made of widespread historic child abuse in Jersey in the 1970s. Walker made it clear that his Council of Ministers would ensure that anyone who had been guilty of child abuse in that investigation would be brought to justice and that a fully independent public enquiry, chaired by a leading U.K. lawyer, would be established. Since then a number of individuals have been prosecuted and the enquiry, whose start was delayed due to police investigations, has commenced its work.

On 25 February 2008 in an interview with Jeremy Paxman on the BBC's Newsnight programme the BBC, unbeknown and invisible to Walker, used footage of an interview he had previously given to BBC Jersey which sought to suggest he was more interested in Jersey's reputation than the victims of child abuse.

However, on 26 February 2009, the BBC Trust, the BBC's own Editorial Watchdog, upheld a complaint from a member of the public and released a report criticising the Newsnight programme for significant failings in the conduct of this interview, stating that the interview had not upheld the BBC's guidelines on fairness and impartiality, that Senator Walker had been misquoted, that Walker's earlier comments had been edited in a way as to misrepresent what Senator Walker had said and so as to mislead the audience and that the correction had not gone far enough in remedying the unfair implications that the quotes had suggested. Frank Walker stated that he was very happy with the outcome, and that he felt vindicated for what he felt was the low-point of his political career.

Walker was appointed an Officer of the Order of the British Empire (OBE) in the 2011 New Year Honours List.

== Current positions ==
Walker now chairs Andium Homes, a company set up to bring all Jersey's social housing stock up to Decent Homes Standard, and meet the needs of those struggling to buy their first property, and Digital Jersey, the company charged with leading Jersey's technological development, both of which are fully owned by the States of Jersey. He also acts as trustee for Sanctuary House, a charitable organisation that seeks to assist disadvantaged and homeless men get their lives back on track, and is a churchwarden at St Brelade's Church.

== Family ==
He is married to Fiona and has four children, two step-children, six grandchildren and three step grandchildren.
