= Kevin C. Lewis =

Jersey politician

Connétable of St Saviour
- In office 2022–2026
- Preceded by: Sadie Rennard
- Succeeded by: Dave Curtis

Deputy for St Saviour No. 2
- In office 2005–2022

Minister for Infrastructure
- In office 7 June 2018 – 12 July 2022
- Preceded by: Eddie Noel
- Succeeded by: Tom Binet

Minister for Transport and Technical Services
- In office 18 November 2011 – 2014
- Preceded by: Connétable Mike Jackson
- Succeeded by: Eddie Noel

Personal details
- Born: Kevin Charles Lewis
- Party: Independent

Kevin Charles Lewis was a Jersey politician who served as Connétable of St Saviour from 2022 to 2026. Previously, he represented St Saviour No. 2 as a Deputy from 2005 until 2022 and served twice as the Island's minister responsible for transport and infrastructure, first as Minister for Transport and Technical Services (2011–2014) and later as Minister for Infrastructure (2018–2022).

== Early life and career ==
Before entering politics, Lewis worked in the film and cinema industry. Between 1980 and 1989 he coordinated filming in Jersey for the BBC television series Bergerac. He later served as managing director of the Cine Centre Cinema and the New Forum Cinema, and has long organised the Jersey Film Festival, raising funds for local charities.

== Political career ==
Lewis was first elected to the States Assembly as Deputy for St Saviour No. 2 at the 2005 general election. He was subsequently re-elected in 2008, 2011, 2014 and 2018.

During his first two terms he served as Assistant Minister for Transport and Technical Services. In 2011 he was appointed Minister for Transport and Technical Services in the Council of Ministers of Chief Minister Ian Gorst.

Following the 2018 general election, Lewis was appointed Minister for Infrastructure by Chief Minister John Le Fondré. During his ministerial career he oversaw transport, highways, public infrastructure and property services, and promoted measures including the reintroduction of double-decker buses and road-safety initiatives.

In 2022 Lewis successfully contested the office of Connétable of St Saviour, vacating his seat as Deputy. Lewis served as Connétable of St Saviour from 2022 until his defeat at the 2026 general election.
