= Terry Le Sueur =

Jersey politician (born 1942)

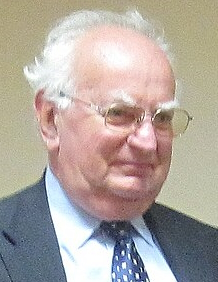

Chief Minister of Jersey
- In office 12 December 2008 – 18 November 2011
- Monarch: Elizabeth II
- Governor: Andrew Ridgway; John McColl
- Preceded by: Frank Walker
- Succeeded by: Ian Gorst

Senator

Deputy (St Helier No. 3)

Personal details
- Born: 1942 (age 83–84) Millbrook, Jersey
- Party: Independent
- Spouse: Angela Le Sueur
- Children: Ben; Judy; Paul
- Education: Jesus College, Oxford

Terence Augustine Le Sueur OBE was Chief Minister of Jersey between 2008 and 2011.

He was born at Millbrook, Saint Helier, and was educated at De La Salle College, Jersey and Oxford University, where he was the King Charles Exhibitioner at Jesus College; and read physics. After being a teacher at De La Salle College, Jersey he moved into a career in accountancy.

He was first elected to the States of Jersey as Deputy for St Helier #3&4 in 1987 (re-elected 1990, 1993 and 1996). In 1990 he became President of the Social Security Committee. He then became Vice-President of État Civil and Telecoms. He was elected a Senator in 1999. He was re-elected as a Senator in the 2005 election. He served as Minister for Treasury and Resources 2005–2008.

Le Sueur was appointed Officer of the Order of the British Empire (OBE) in the 2012 New Year Honours for political service.

Political offices
Preceded by Frank Walker	Chief Minister of Jersey; 2008–2011	Succeeded by Ian Gorst
