= Constitution of Jersey =

Principles of political governance of the Bailiwick of Jersey

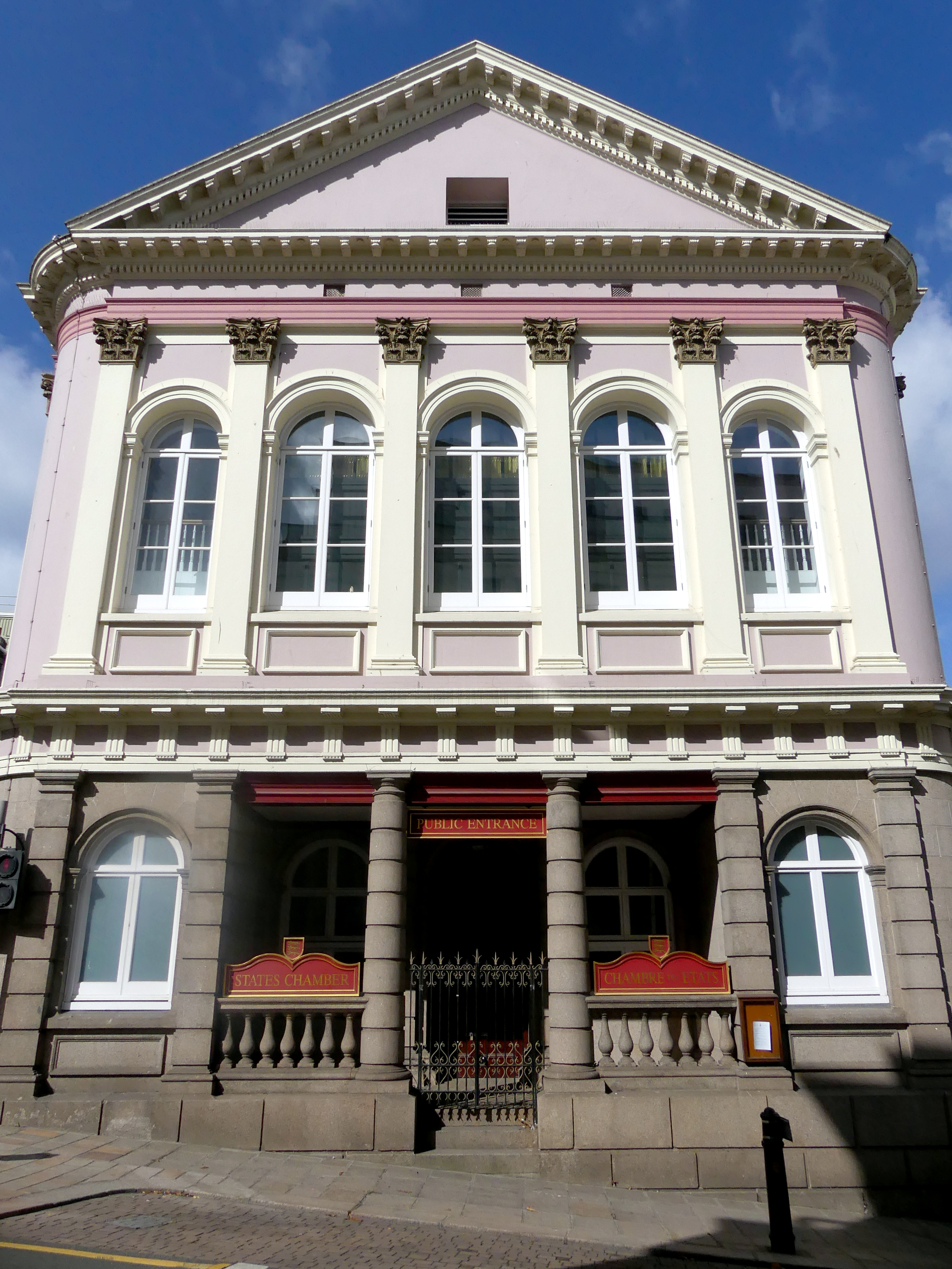
Jersey's elected parliament in St Helier, the States Assembly

Jersey is a self-governing Crown Dependency with an uncodified constitution. It is not part of the United Kingdom, but owes allegiance to the British Crown, and the United Kingdom is responsible for its defence and international representation. Jersey has its own legislature, executive government, courts, legal system and fiscal autonomy.

The principal modern institutions are the States Assembly, the Council of Ministers, the Royal Court, the Bailiff, the Law Officers, the parish system headed by the connétable, and several integrity institutions.

== Constitutional status ==
Jersey’s constitution can be described in several overlapping ways. It is a constitutional monarchy, a parliamentary democracy, a Crown Dependency, and an uncodified constitution.

- As a constitutional monarchy, Jersey recognises Charles III as head of state, reigning in right of Jersey. The Lieutenant Governor represents the Crown in the Island. Several senior office-holders, including the Bailiff, Deputy Bailiff, Attorney General and Solicitor General, are appointed by the Crown. Laws adopted by the States Assembly require royal assent before they can come into force.
- Jersey is also a parliamentary democracy. Members of the States Assembly are elected every four years. The assembly makes legislation, elects the Chief Minister, approves the appointment of ministers, and scrutinises the work of the Council of Ministers and public authorities.
- As a Crown Dependency, Jersey has domestic autonomy. The States Assembly legislates on most internal matters, while the UK Government is responsible for the Island’s defence and international representation. Jersey is not part of the United Kingdom. Laws passed by the States Assembly are reviewed by the UK Ministry of Justice before being submitted for royal assent.
- Jersey has an uncodified constitution. Like the United Kingdom, its constitutional rules are found in a range of sources rather than in a single constitutional document. These include legislation, Orders in Council, royal charters, customary law, case law, parliamentary rules and constitutional conventions. Jersey does not have an entrenched constitution under which courts may strike down primary legislation solely because it is inconsistent with a constitutional norm.

== Sources of the constitution ==
Jersey does not have a single codified constitutional document. Its constitutional rules are derived from a range of sources, including customary law, Royal Charters and Orders in Council, legislation passed by the States Assembly, Acts of the Parliament of the United Kingdom extended to Jersey, judicial decisions and constitutional conventions. These sources reflect Jersey’s historical relationship with the Crown and the development of its own institutions of self-government.

Several secondary sources are also used to explain Jersey’s constitutional development, although they are not themselves binding legal sources. These include F. de L. Bois’s A Constitutional History of Jersey and R. G. Le Hérissier’s The Development of the Government of Jersey 1771–1972, both published by the States of Jersey.

=== Customary law ===
Customary law is law derived from accepted usage and practice rather than from legislation. In Jersey, customary law remains a source of constitutional law as well as private law. Its constitutional significance lies principally in the historical development of the island’s courts, parishes and public offices.

The Royal Court is the oldest court in Jersey and is the only one of the island’s courts not created by statute. The parish system also has customary foundations, although many aspects of parish government are now regulated by legislation. Connétables, who are the heads of the twelve parishes and members of the States Assembly by virtue of that office, have been described as creatures of customary law. Customary law may be declared and developed by the courts, but it may also be modified or abolished by legislation passed by the States Assembly.

=== Royal charters and orders in council ===
Royal charters were an important source of Jersey’s constitutional privileges. From the thirteenth century onwards, successive English monarchs confirmed or extended the liberties, customs, immunities and exemptions of the Channel Islands, often in recognition of their loyalty to the Crown and the costs and dangers arising from their position close to France.

Charters issued by Edward III, Richard II, Henry IV, Henry V, Henry VI, Edward IV, Richard III and later monarchs repeatedly confirmed the islanders’ privileges for themselves and their heirs and successors. Several charters also protected economic privileges, including exemption from tolls, duties and customs in England, while others confirmed local jurisdiction and limited the authority of royal officials. Elizabeth I’s charter confirmed the jurisdiction of the Royal Court and the principle that islanders should not be compelled to appear before English courts except by royal determination.

Orders in Council are another form of legal instrument issued by the Crown. They may contain rules of constitutional significance for Jersey, including rules about the process by which Laws passed by the States Assembly receive royal assent through the Privy Council.

=== Legislation ===
Legislation passed by the States Assembly is a central source of Jersey’s modern constitutional rules.

The most important enactment is the States of Jersey Law 2005, which regulates the composition and proceedings of the States Assembly, introduced ministerial government, and removed the Bailiff’s casting vote and the Lieutenant-Governor’s veto.

Other legislation regulates particular parts of the constitutional system. The Public Elections (Jersey) Law 2002 provides the framework for elections to the States Assembly, while the Public Finances (Jersey) Law 2005 governs the management of public money. The Royal Court (Jersey) Law 1948 concerns the structure of the Royal Court, and the Human Rights (Jersey) Law 2000 gives effect in Jersey law to rights derived from the European Convention on Human Rights.

The parish system and honorary police are also partly regulated by legislation, including the Loi (1804) au sujet des assemblées paroissiales, the Loi (1905) au sujet des assemblées paroissiales, the Loi (1853) au sujet des centeniers et officiers de police, and the Centeniers (Terms of Office) (Jersey) Law 2007.

=== Judicial decisions ===
Judgments of Jersey’s higher courts — the Royal Court, the Jersey Court of Appeal and the Judicial Committee of the Privy Council — are a further source of constitutional law. In relation to parish government, for example, the courts have clarified both the customary law requirement that procureurs du bien public reside in the parish they serve and the principle that 'the Principals and Officers, adopting a resolution at a properly convened meeting, are the ultimate authority in all parochial matters'.

=== Constitutional conventions ===
Constitutional conventions also form part of Jersey’s constitutional arrangements. These are political or constitutional norms rather than rules directly enforceable by courts. Examples include the understanding that the UK Parliament does not normally legislate for Jersey without consultation and consent; the expectation that royal assent is not ordinarily refused to Laws passed by the States Assembly unless serious constitutional or international-obligation concerns arise; and the norms of ministerial responsibility and collective government reflected in Jersey’s ministerial codes.

== Constitutional principles ==
Jersey’s constitutional arrangements are underpinned by a number of general principles, some of which are expressed in legislation and others in constitutional practice. The preamble to the States of Jersey Law 2005 recognises that Jersey has ‘autonomous capacity in domestic affairs’ and refers to the aim of promoting ‘democratic, accountable and responsive governance’ in accordance with international human rights principles.

One is legislative supremacy, governing the relationship between Jersey's legislature and courts. The States Assembly is Jersey’s elected legislature responsible for passing primary legislation for the Island. Laws adopted by the Assembly require royal assent through the Privy Council and registration in the Royal Court before coming into force. Jersey courts cannot strike down primary legislation passed by the States Assembly. Under the Human Rights (Jersey) Law 2000, however, a court may make a declaration of incompatibility where a Law is incompatible with Convention rights, but such a declaration does not affect the validity, continuing operation or enforcement of the legislation. In Imperium Trustees (Jersey) Ltd v Jersey Competent Authority, the Jersey Court of Appeal made a declaration that the International Co-operation (Protection from Liability) (Jersey) Law 2018 was incompatible with Convention rights. The declaration did not invalidate the Law or prevent it from continuing to operate. The declaration was later set aside on appeal.

Jersey’s constitution also reflects the principle of separation of powers, although not in a strict form. Since the introduction of ministerial government in 2005, executive authority has been exercised by the Chief Minister, ministers and assistant ministers, while the States Assembly retains legislative and scrutiny functions. The Bailiff, however, remains both the Island’s chief judge and the President of the States Assembly. This dual role has been the subject of constitutional debate, particularly in relation to the separation of judicial and legislative functions.

Human rights are also an express constitutional principle. The Human Rights (Jersey) Law 2000 incorporates rights from the European Convention on Human Rights into Jersey law. It makes it unlawful for public authorities to act incompatibly with Convention rights. Following the Jersey Independent Care Inquiry, Jersey strengthened the place of children’s rights in public decision-making by creating the office of Commissioner for Children and Young People and introducing statutory duties linked to the UN Convention on the Rights of the Child.

== Main constitutional bodies ==
Jersey’s constitution operates through a number of institutions with legislative, executive, judicial, parochial and advisory functions. The main constitutional bodies include the following:

Type of body	Jersey bodies and constitutional functions
The Crown	Charles III is head of state represented by the Lieutenant Governor. Jersey is a Crown Dependency. The Crown Officers —Bailiff, Deputy Bailiff, Attorney General and Solicitor General — are formally appointed by the Crown. Laws passed by the States Assembly require royal assent through the Privy Council.
UK Government	The United Kingdom is responsible for Jersey's defence and international relations, although Jersey has autonomy in domestic affairs. The UK Ministry of Justice reviews Laws passed by the States Assembly before they are presented for royal assent.
Legislature	The States Assembly is Jersey's elected parliament. It passes Laws and subordinate legislation, approves public spending, appoints the Chief Minister and Council of Ministers, and holds the executive to account through questions, debates, Scrutiny Panels and the Public Accounts Committee. The Bailiff is President of the Assembly.
Executive	Executive government is exercised by the Chief Minister, the Council of Ministers, ministers and assistant ministers, supported by Government of Jersey departments and the civil service.
Parishes	Jersey's twelve parishes provide local administration. Each parish administration is headed by a connétable, who is also an elected member of the States Assembly.
Courts and judiciary	The Bailiff is head of the judiciary. Jersey's courts include the Magistrate's Court, the Royal Court, the Jersey Court of Appeal and the Judicial Committee of the Privy Council. The courts interpret and apply Jersey law and may review the legality of public authority action.
Law Officers	The Attorney General and Solicitor General advise the Crown and public authorities, conduct prosecutions and may advise the States Assembly on legal matters. They may speak in the Assembly but do not vote.
Electoral bodies	Elections involve the Jersey Electoral Authority, the Judicial Greffe, the States Greffe and parish electoral administrators. Their functions include registration of political parties, election administration, candidate guidance, regulation of candidate conduct and oversight of election expenditure within their statutory roles.
Independent accountability and integrity bodies	Independent bodies such as the Comptroller and Auditor General, the Commissioner for Standards, the Children and Young People's Commissioner, the Jersey Appointments Commission, the Jersey Statistics Council and the Fiscal Policy Panel support accountability, standards, audit, independent advice and evidence-based decision-making.

== Constitutional reform ==
Jersey’s constitutional reforms have generally been incremental rather than the result of adopting a single written constitution. Major reforms have concerned the composition of the States Assembly, the separation of judicial and legislative functions, the creation of ministerial government, and the balance between parish, island-wide and executive institutions.

=== Referendums ===
Jersey’s constitution is uncodified, and constitutional change is generally made through ordinary legislative and political processes rather than through a special amendment procedure. Referendums may, however, be held under the Referendum (Jersey) Law 2017.

Under the 2017 Law, the States Assembly may resolve by Act that a referendum be held on any matter. The Act must fix the date of the referendum and set out the form of the ballot paper, including the referendum question. The Referendum Commission is responsible for giving an opinion on the suitability of the wording of a proposed referendum question and for designating lead campaign groups.

Two Island-wide referendums have been held on constitutional questions.

- In 2013, a referendum was held on the composition of the States Assembly. Voters chose 'Option B', which would have retained the connétables, removed senators and reduced the Assembly to 42 members. The States Assembly subsequently rejected legislation to implement the result by 28 votes to 21, with one abstention.
- In 2014, voters were asked whether the connétables should remain members of the States as an automatic right; 15,068 voted in favour and 9,061 voted against.

=== Nineteenth-century reforms ===
During the nineteenth century, local reform campaigns and pressure from the UK Government led to changes in the courts, policing and the composition of the States. Reforms included the replacement of lay Jurats by professional judges for decisions on questions of law, the creation of the Police Court, later the Magistrate’s Court, the establishment of the Petty Debts Court, and the creation of a paid police force for St Helier alongside the Honorary Police

The elected office of Deputy was created in 1845, although representation continued to favour the rural parishes over the more populous town parish of St Helier.

=== Post-war reforms ===
Further reforms followed the German occupation of the Channel Islands during the Second World War. In 1946, proposals for reform were considered by a committee of the Privy Council. The post-war changes removed the Jurats and Rectors from membership of the States Assembly. The Jurats, who continued to sit in the Royal Court, were replaced in the States by senators elected on an island-wide basis. The office of Bailiff was not substantially altered.

=== Machinery of government ===
The most significant modern review of Jersey’s machinery of government was the 2000 Clothier Report. It recommended a move away from the committee system of government, the creation of ministerial government and scrutiny, changes to the composition of the States Assembly, and the election of a Speaker in place of the Bailiff as presiding officer of the States. The States of Jersey Law 2005 implemented parts of this programme by replacing the committee system with a Council of Ministers headed by a Chief Minister and by establishing a system of scrutiny.

Other recommendations have not, however, been implemented:

- the creation of a single type of States member (replacing senators, deputies and connétables)
- connétables ceasing to be ex officio members of the States Assembly
- replacing the Bailiff’s role in the States Assembly with an elected speaker
- creation of a public services ombudsperson.

=== Electoral reform ===
Electoral reform has been a recurring issue in Jersey politics. In 2000, the Clothier Report recommended replacing the different categories of elected States members with a single category of member. The recommendation was not implemented, and later debates on reform have focused on the respective roles of senators, deputies and connétables, the size of the Assembly, constituency boundaries and voter equality.

An Electoral Commission was established by the States Assembly in 2011 after repeated failures to agree reforms to Jersey’s electoral system. Its terms of reference covered the classes of States members, constituencies and mandates, the number of members and terms of office. In its final report, the commission proposed two reform options for a referendum. Option A would have removed the connétables from the Assembly and created 42 deputies elected from six large districts. Option B, which was chosen by voters in the 2013 referendum, would have retained the connétables, abolished senators and created six districts each electing five deputies, reducing the Assembly from 49 to 42 members. The result was not binding, and the States Assembly later rejected legislation to implement Option B.

==== Senators ====
Debate about senators has centred on the relationship between Island-wide representation and voter equality. Supporters have argued that senators provide an Island-wide mandate and allow all voters to take part in choosing some members of the Assembly. Critics have argued that the role complicates the electoral system and sits uneasily with reforms intended to equalise voting power between constituencies. These competing arguments have contributed to repeated changes in the number, term and existence of senators.

The office of senator was introduced in 1948, when the Jurats and rectors were removed from the States Assembly and 12 senators were elected on an Island-wide basis. Senators originally served nine-year terms, with four seats falling vacant every three years; by the States of Jersey Law 1966 their term was six years, with six senators retiring every three years. Reforms agreed in the early 2010s moved Jersey towards a single general election day, reduced the number of senators from 12 to eight at the 2014 election and aligned senators with other elected members on four-year terms. Senators were abolished for the 2022 general election, when the number of deputies was increased and new deputy constituencies were introduced. In 2025, the States Assembly approved legislation to reintroduce senators for the 2026 general election, with nine senators elected Island-wide and the number of deputies reduced to 28.

==== Connétables ====
Debate has also focused on whether the connétable should continue to sit in the States Assembly automatically by virtue of their parish office. The 2000 Clothier Report recommended that they should cease to be ex officio members, arguing that their role in the Assembly was not distinguishable from that of deputies, though connétables would remain free to stand for election to the Assembly separately. The issue was later put to voters in a 2014 referendum, in which 15,068 voted in favour of connétables remaining automatic members of the States and 9,061 voted against. In 2025, during debates on the reintroduction of senators, the States Assembly rejected an amendment that would have removed connétables from the Assembly.

=== Role of the Bailiff ===
The dual role of the Bailiff as both chief judge and presiding officer of the States Assembly has also been the subject of reform debate. In 2010, the Carswell review recommended that the Bailiff should cease to preside over the States and that an elected Speaker should take that role. The recommendation was not implemented, and the Bailiff remains the presiding officer of the States Assembly as well as President of the Royal Court.

=== Written constitution proposals ===
Jersey does not have a single written constitution. In 2011, Deputy Paul Le Claire lodged a proposition requesting the Chief Minister to bring forward a draft written constitution for debate. He argued that discussion of the Bailiff’s dual role had shown the need to consider whether Jersey’s constitutional arrangements should be set out in a single document. The Chief Minister opposed the proposal, arguing that Jersey’s constitution had developed through royal charters, customary law, case law, legislation, constitutional conventions and other written sources, and that codification risked reducing the flexibility of the existing arrangements. The Chief Minister also argued that preparing a written constitution would be costly, require extensive consultation and negotiation with the United Kingdom and the Crown, and could not realistically be completed quickly. The States Assembly rejected the proposition on 4 May 2011.

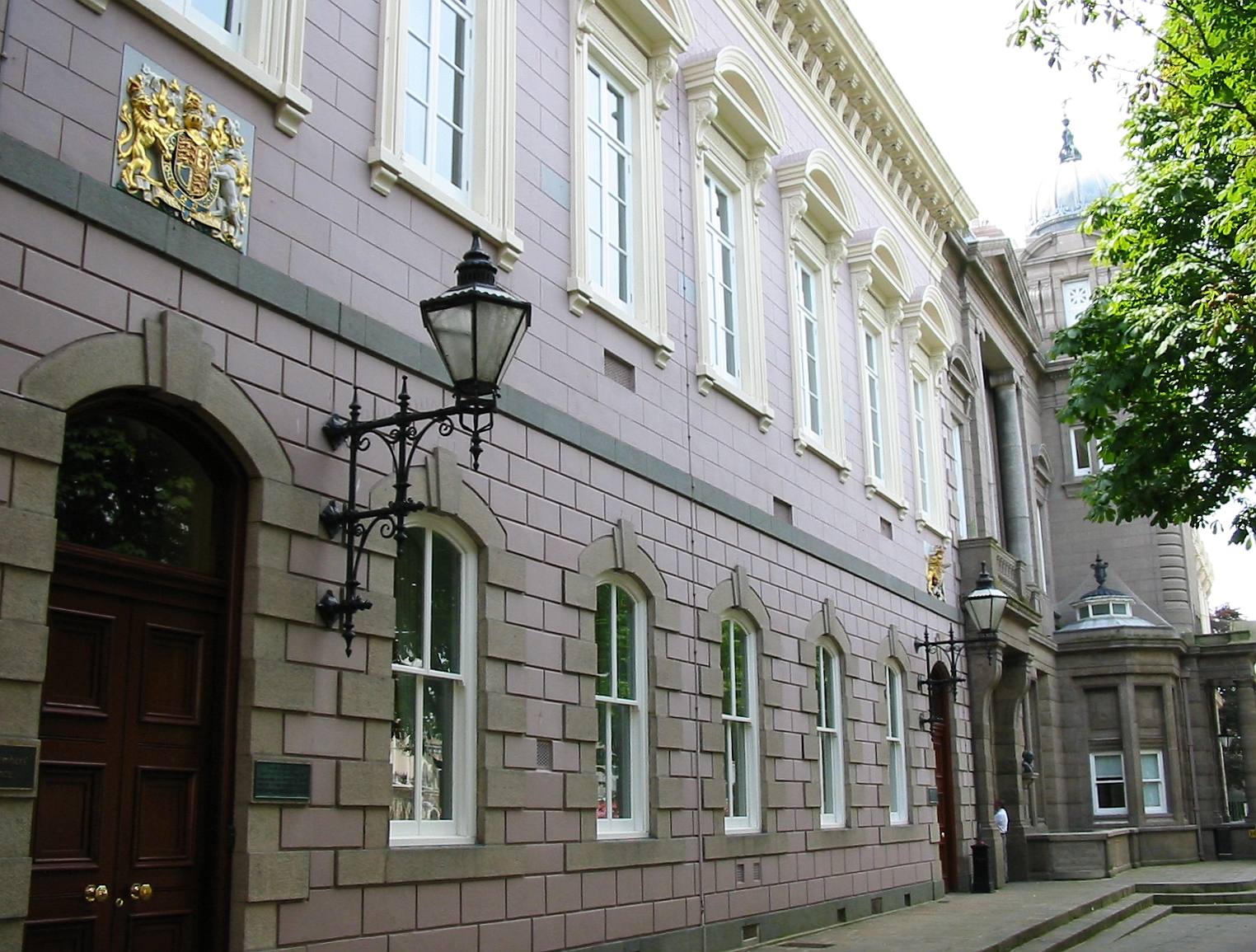
All laws in Jersey must be registered by the Royal Court to become law.

== Role of the United Kingdom ==
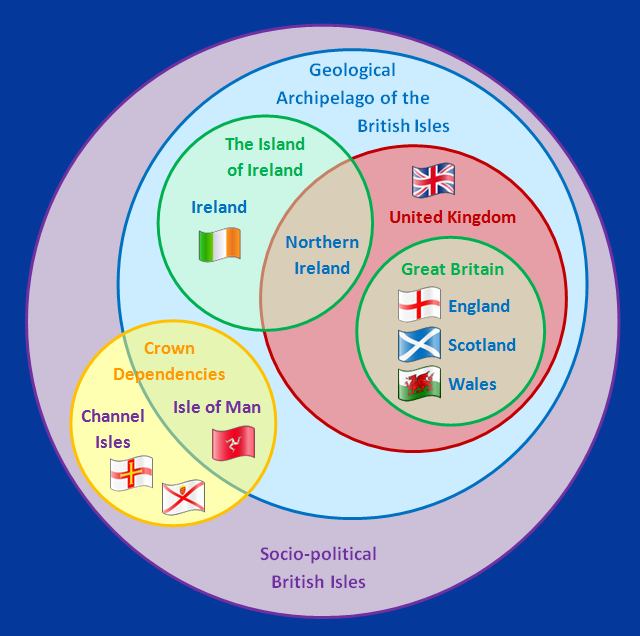
Jersey's constitutional geography places it outside the United Kingdom, but part of the British Islands.

The Crown Dependencies have each had a historic and complex relationship with the United Kingdom and with its predecessors. Jersey is not, and has never been, part of the United Kingdom, the Kingdom of Great Britain or the Kingdom of England, however, it has been a dependency of the monarch of each of these states at their time of existence. Therefore, the government in Westminster has played an important role in Jersey's lawmaking and political landscape since Jersey was separated from the Norman mainland. Furthermore, the island's strong non-political links with Great Britain have meant that the British political goings-on has frequently had a strong effect on Jersey's politics.

Unlike the situation of the British Overseas Territories, the UK Parliament has never been the constitutional link between the Channel Islands and the UK and the island has never had representation in the House of Commons. The link is instead through the monarch. Within the United Kingdom government, responsibility for relations between Jersey (and the other Crown dependencies) and the United Kingdom lie in the Crown Dependencies Branch within the International Directorate of the Ministry of Justice, which has a core team of three officials, with four others and four lawyers available when required.

In 2010, the House of Commons Justice Committee, conducting an inquiry into the Crown dependencies, found that the Jersey government and those of the other islands were "with some important caveats, content with their relationship with the Ministry of Justice". Tensions have, however, arisen from time to time. In the 1980s, there were discussions about a financial contribution from Jersey towards the United Kingdom's costs in relation to defence and international representation. In March 2009, the House of Lords Constitution Committee criticised UK government proposals in the Borders, Citizenship and Immigration Bill dealing with the Common Travel Area, concluding that "the policy-making process ... has not been informed by any real appreciation of the constitutional status of the Crown dependencies or the rights of free movement of Islanders". In 2009, the UK cancelled the reciprocal health agreement with Jersey, though a new one came into effect in April 2011.

According to constitutional convention, United Kingdom legislation may be extended to Jersey by Order in Council at the request of the Island's government. Whether an Act of the United Kingdom Parliament may expressly apply to the Island as regards matters of self-government, or whether this historic power is now in abeyance, is a matter of legal debate. The States of Jersey Law 2005 established that no United Kingdom Act or Order in Council may apply to the Bailiwick without being referred to the States of Jersey.

Although Jersey is for most day-to-day purposes entirely self-governing in relation to its internal affairs, the Crown retains residual responsibility for the "good government" of the island. The UK government has consistently adopted a "non-interventionist policy", and following the "high degree of consensus amongst academics, legal advisers, politicians and officials" would only intervene "in the event of a fundamental breakdown in public order or the rule of law, endemic corruption in the government or other extreme circumstances". According to UK Ministry of Justice guidance, UK Government departments have a responsibility to engage directly with the Crown Dependencies.
