= Jerry Dorey =

Jersey politician

Jerry Dorey was a member of the States of Jersey from 1993–2005.

== Biography ==
Jerry Dorey was born in 1951 at Ealing, London. He was educated at Victoria College, Jersey and Oxford University, gaining an M.A. (Oxon) in French. He took up a career as a freelance computer programmer in Jersey before being elected to the States of Jersey as Deputy for Saint Helier No.1 district in 1993.

As a Deputy he was a member of Education, Health, Public Services, Broadcasting, JTA, Employment and Social Security and Establishment Committees; he sat on the Marina Committee of Inquiry, and the Limited Liability Partnerships Committee of Inquiry.

In February 1999 he stood in a Senatorial by-election and was voted in with 3,320 votes (beating Paul Le Claire, Harry Cole and Geraint Jennings).

Senator Dorey lost his Senatorial seat at the following general election in October 1999, being edged out in 7th place. The following month he was voted back as Deputy by the voters of St Helier No. 1 with 463 votes.

He became vice-president of Environment and Public Services, and in that position argued for a resiting of waste disposal in his St Helier constituency; he described the loss of his seat in the 2005 elections as a "severe disappointment".
