= Jersey Electoral Authority =

Election commission in Jersey

Agency overview
- Formed: 2022
- Type: Independent election authority
- Jurisdiction: Jersey
- Status: Statutory body
- Headquarters: St Helier, Jersey
- Parent agency: States Assembly
- Website: www.vote.je/jea/

The Jersey Electoral Authority (JEA) is the independent, non-partisan election commission which oversees elections in Jersey.

It is a statutory body established in 2022 and operates under Part 3A of the Elections (Jersey) Law 2002. Its functions include preparing a code of conduct for candidates, dealing with certain complaints made by candidates, observing pre-poll voting, polling and counts, and reporting on the administration of public elections.

== Establishment and membership ==
The JEA was established following recommendations made by a Commonwealth Parliamentary Association (CPA) election observation mission after the 2018 general election. These included the creation of "a permanent election administration body independent of the three branches of State to provide continuous oversight and review of the electoral framework, including candidate and voter registration, campaign finance, media provisions and electoral dispute resolution."

The authority is required to report to the States Assembly and consists of four members drawn from the general public, a representative of Jersey's 12 parishes, the Greffier of the States and the Judicial Greffier. One of the ordinary members acts as chair. The chair and ordinary members of the JEA are appointed by the States Assembly Privileges and Procedures Committee from individuals nominated by the Judicial Greffier and the Greffier of the States.

The current members of the Authority are:

Name	Capacity	Background
Lisa Hart	Greffier of the States, ex officio	Joined the States Greffe in 2000 and served as Assistant and Deputy Greffier before becoming Greffier of the States in 2022.
Rebecca Morley-Kirk	Judicial Greffier, ex officio	An advocate who became Jersey's first female Judicial Greffier in 2023 and is responsible for the administration of the island's courts.
Beverley Corley	Parish representative	Parish Secretary of St Clement.
Michael Marett-Crosby	Chair	Charity executive who leads organisations providing humanitarian relief and supporting democracy in Myanmar. He works for Daw Aung San Suu Kyi, Nobel Laureate and Leader of the National League for Democracy.
Johannes Martinson	Member	Described in the appointment report as having an interest in democratic integrity and accessibility.
Matthew Swan	Member	A Jersey advocate and former Viscount of the Royal Court, who has also served on the Jersey Gambling Commission and Jersey Law Commission.
Christian Gott	Member	A former hospitality senior manager with more than 30 years' experience in the sector.

== Election involvement ==
=== 2022 general election ===
The JEA was in place for the 2022 Jersey general election, the first general election after its establishment. A further observation report published by the CPA said the JEA's contribution to the election was limited because it had been created late in the electoral cycle.

The report made 14 recommendations, including that Jersey should review election administration "to improve the general efficiency and transparency of elections", audit the voter registration system, consider administrative redress for election complaints, review polling station provision, introduce a separate verification stage at vote counts and publish more detailed election results.

=== 2026 general election ===
In 2025, the JEA was reconvened ahead of the 2026 Jersey general election, with new members and a chair appointed to oversee nominations, candidate conduct, election expenses, disputes and complaints, and to contribute to a report after the election.

During the 2026 campaign, the JEA responded to a complaint about the use of parish resources by a candidate. It issued a letter to the Comité des Connétables reminding elected members that parish resources should not be used for electoral purposes.

In May 2026, the JEA issued a statement during controversy over the political movement Value Jersey. It said Vote.je was the only official source of election information, that the authority had not reviewed or approved surveys designed to identify preferred candidates, and that it was required to remain impartial.

== See also ==
- Elections in Jersey
- 2026 Jersey general election
- States Assembly
