= Outline of Jersey =

British Crown Dependency and country in Europe

The Flag of Jersey

The Coat of arms of Jersey

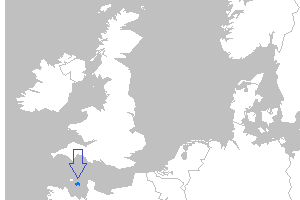
The location of Jersey

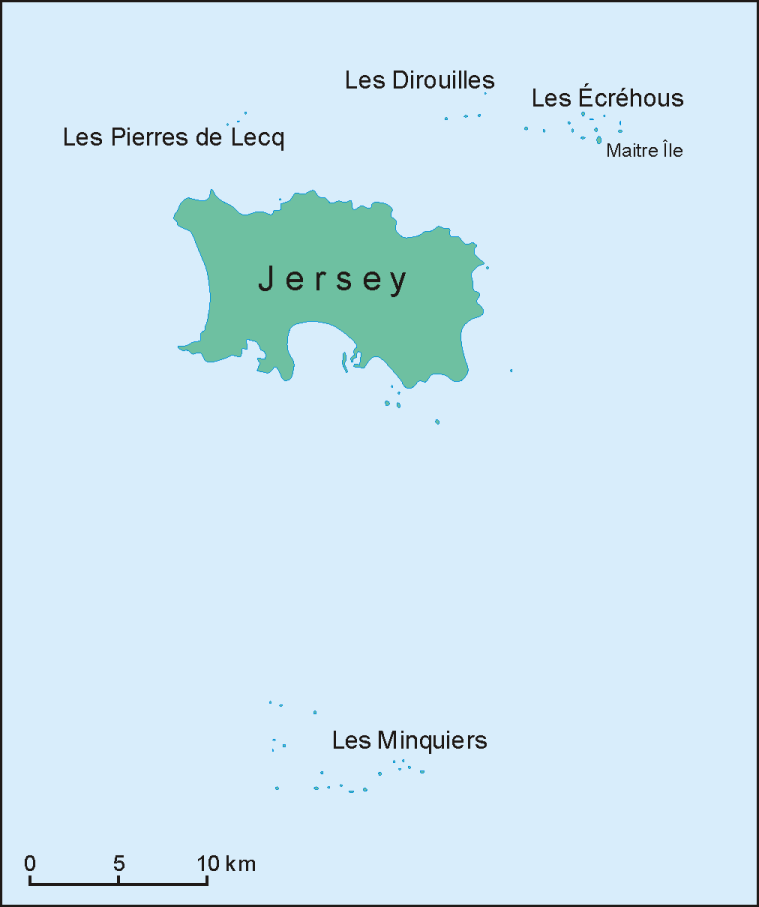
An enlargeable map of the Bailiwick of Jersey

The following outline is provided as an overview of and topical guide to Jersey:

Jersey – British Crown dependency located in the Channel Islands off the coast of Normandy. As well as the island of Jersey itself, the bailiwick includes the nearby uninhabited islands of the Minquiers, Écréhous, the Pierres de Lecq and other rocks and reefs. Together with the Bailiwick of Guernsey it forms the grouping known as the Channel Islands. The defence of all these islands is the responsibility of the United Kingdom. However, Jersey is part of neither the UK nor the European Union; rather, like the Isle of Man, it is a separate possession of the Crown. Jersey belongs to the Common Travel Area.

== General reference ==
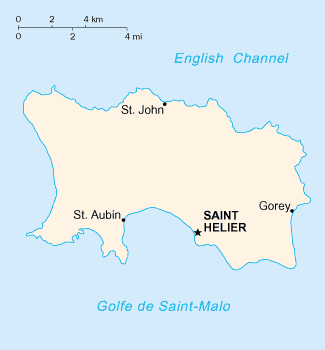
An enlargeable basic map of the island of Jersey

- Pronunciation:
- Common English country name: Jersey
- Official English country name: The Bailiwick of Jersey
- Common endonym(s):
- Official endonym(s):
- Adjectival(s):
- Demonym(s): Jerseymen
- Etymology: Name of Jersey
- ISO country codes: JE, JEY, 832
- ISO region codes: See ISO 3166-2:JE
- Internet country code top-level domain: .je
- Bibliography of Jersey

== Geography of Jersey ==
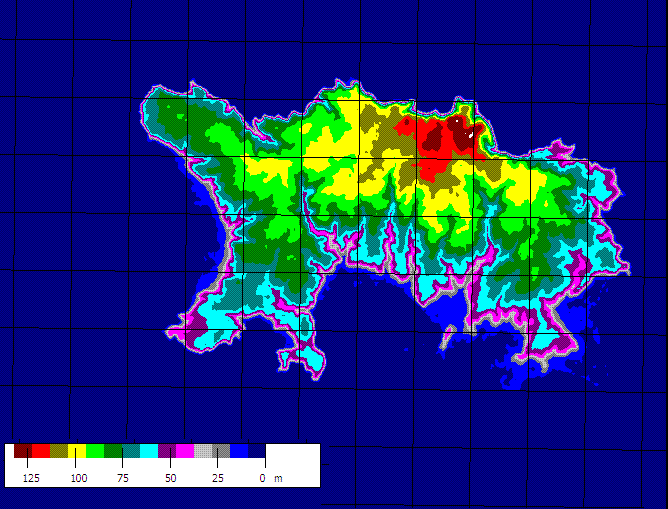
An enlargeable topographic map of the island of Jersey

Geography of Jersey

- Jersey is: A British Crown dependency
- Location:
  - Northern Hemisphere and Western Hemisphere
    - Europe
      - Northern Europe
  - Atlantic Ocean
    - English Channel
  - Time zone: Western European Time or Greenwich Mean Time (UTC+00), Western European Summer Time or British Summer Time (UTC+01)
  - Extreme points of Jersey
    - High: Les Platons 143 m (469 ft)
    - Low: English Channel 0 m
  - Land boundaries: none
  - Coastline: English Channel 70 km
- Population of Jersey: 89,300 (31 December 2006) - 189th most populous country
- Area of Jersey: 116 km^{2}
- Atlas of Jersey

=== Environment of Jersey ===
An enlargeable satellite image of the island of Jersey

- Climate of Jersey
- Renewable energy in Jersey
- Geology of Jersey
- Protected areas of Jersey
  - Biosphere reserves in Jersey
  - National parks of Jersey
- Wildlife of Jersey
  - Fauna of Jersey
    - Birds of Jersey
    - Mammals of Jersey

==== Natural geographic features of Jersey ====
- Islands of Jersey
- World Heritage Sites in Jersey: None

=== Regions of Jersey ===
Parishes of Jersey

==== Ecoregions of Jersey ====
List of ecoregions in Jersey

- Ecoregions in Jersey

==== Administrative divisions of Jersey ====
Parishes of Jersey

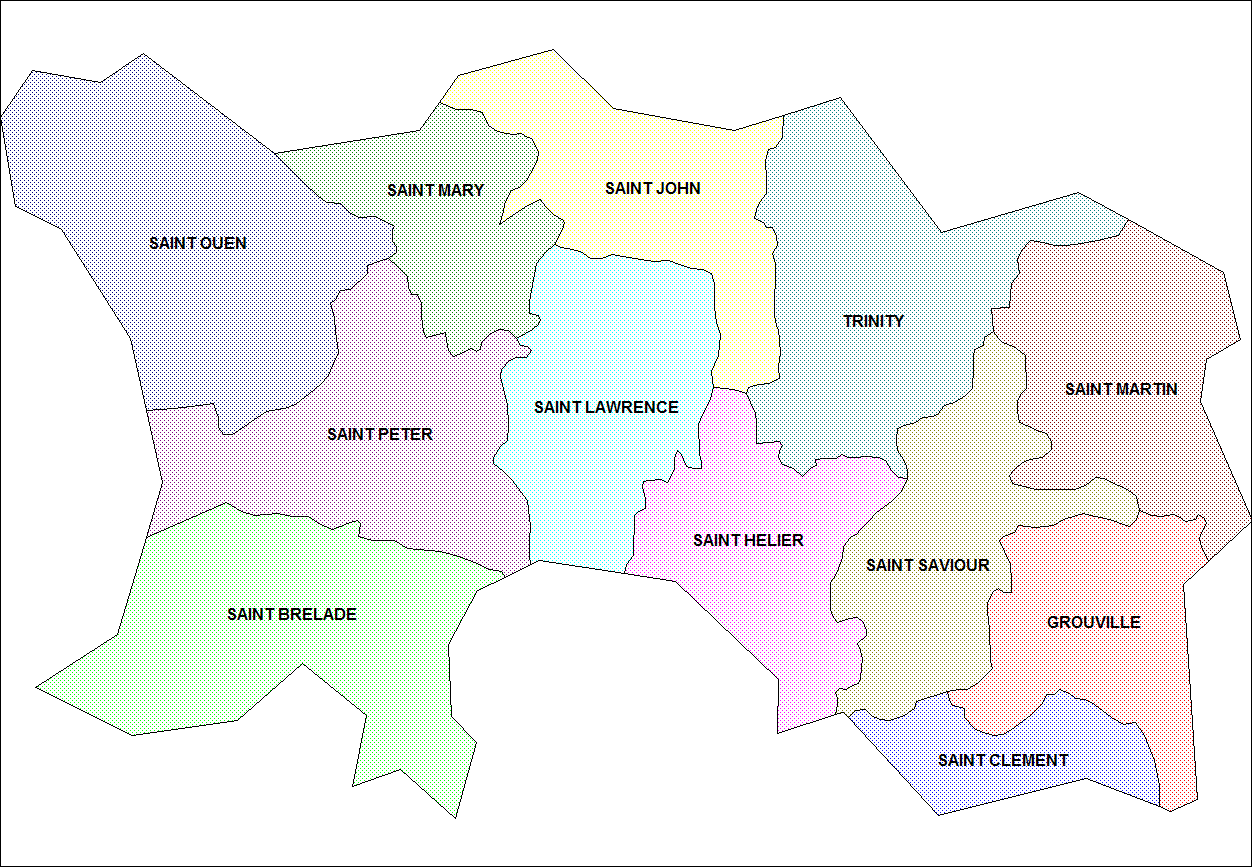
Map of the parishes of Jersey

The Channel Island of Jersey is divided into twelve parishes. All have access to the sea and are named after the saints to whom their ancient parish churches are dedicated:

- Saint Helier (incorporating the island's capital)
- Grouville (historically Saint Martin de Grouville; incorporating Les Minquiers)
- Saint Brélade
- Saint Clement
- Saint John
- Saint Lawrence
- Saint Martin (historically Saint Martin le Vieux; incorporating Les Écréhous)
- Saint Mary
- Saint Ouen
- Saint Peter
- Saint Saviour
- Trinity

===== Vingtaines of Jersey =====
Vingtaine

===== Cities in Jersey =====
- Capital of Jersey: Saint Helier
- Cities of Jersey

=== Demography of Jersey ===
Demographics of Jersey

== Proposed government and politics of Jersey ==
Politics of Jersey

- Form of government:
- Capital of Jersey: Saint Helier
- Elections in Jersey
- Political parties in Jersey
- Politicians in Jersey

=== Branches of the government of Jersey ===
Government of Jersey

==== Executive branch of the government of Jersey ====
- Head of state: Duke of Normandy,
- Head of government: Chief Minister of Jersey,
- Council of Ministers of Jersey

==== Legislative branch of the government of Jersey ====
- Parliament of Jersey (unicameral)

==== Judicial branch of the government of Jersey ====
Courts of Jersey

- Law of Jersey

=== Foreign relations of Jersey ===
- Diplomatic missions of Jersey

==== International organization membership ====
The Bailiwick of Jersey is a member of:

- British-Irish Council (BIC)

=== Law and order in Jersey ===
Law of Jersey

- Capital punishment in Jersey
- Constitution of Jersey
- Crime in Jersey
- Human rights in Jersey
  - Jersey falls under the jurisdiction of:
    - Human rights in the United Kingdom
  - LGBT rights in Jersey
    - Recognition of same-sex unions in Jersey
  - Freedom of religion in Jersey
- Law enforcement in Jersey
  - States of Jersey Customs and Immigration Service
  - States of Jersey Police
  - Honorary Police

=== Military of Jersey ===
Military of Jersey

- Command
  - Commander-in-chief: Lieutenant Governor of Jersey
- Forces
  - Royal Militia of the Island of Jersey

=== Local government in Jersey ===
Local government in Jersey

- Parish Assembly

== History of Jersey ==
History of Jersey

- Timeline of the history of Jersey
- Current events of Jersey
- Bailiff of Jersey
- Viscount of Jersey
- Military history of Jersey
  - Battle of Jersey
  - German occupation of the Channel Islands
    - Civilian life under the German occupation of the Channel Islands

== Culture of Jersey ==
Culture of Jersey

- Architecture of Jersey
- Cuisine of Jersey
- Festivals in Jersey
- Languages of Jersey
- Media of Jersey
- National symbols of Jersey
  - Coat of arms of Jersey
  - Flag of Jersey
  - National anthem of Jersey
- People of Jersey
- Public holidays in Jersey
- Records of Jersey
- Religion in Jersey
  - Christianity in Jersey
    - Church of England in Jersey
      - Dean of Jersey
    - Catholic Church in Jersey
  - Hinduism in Jersey
  - Islam in Jersey
  - Judaism in Jersey
  - Sikhism in Jersey
- Scouting in Jersey
- World Heritage Sites in Jersey: None

=== Art in Jersey ===
- Art in Jersey
- Cinema of Jersey
- Literature of Jersey
- Music of Jersey
- Television in Jersey
- Theatre in Jersey

=== Sport in Jersey ===
Sport in Jersey

- Rugby union in Jersey
- Jersey Football Association

== Economy and infrastructure of Jersey ==
Economy of Jersey

- Economic rank, by nominal GDP (2007): 136th (one hundred and thirty sixth)
- Agriculture in Jersey
- Banking in Jersey
  - National Bank of Jersey
- Communications in Jersey
  - Internet in Jersey
  - JE postcode area
- Companies of Jersey
- Currency of Jersey: Pound
  - ISO 4217: n/a (informally JEP)
- Energy in Jersey
  - Energy policy of Jersey
  - Oil industry in Jersey
- Health care in Jersey
- Mining in Jersey
- The International Stock Exchange
- Tourism in Jersey
- Transport in Jersey
  - Airports in Jersey
  - Rail transport in Jersey
  - Roads in Jersey

== Education in Jersey ==
Education in Jersey

- List of schools in Jersey

== See also ==
Jersey

- Crown dependency
- List of international rankings
- Outline of Europe
- Outline of geography
- Outline of the United Kingdom
