= States Building =

Parliament building in St Helier, Jersey

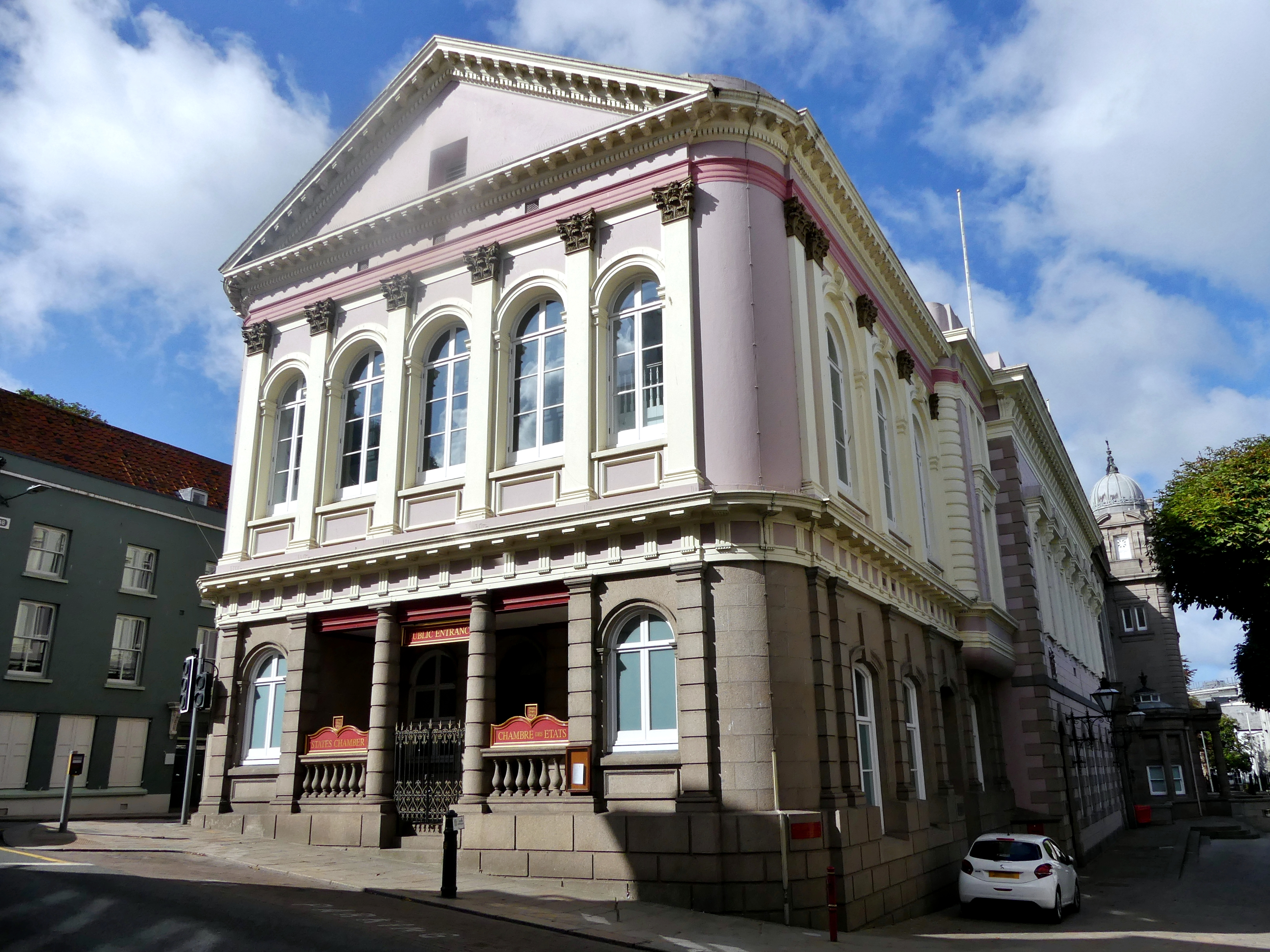
- The building in September 2019
- Interactive map of States Building
- Location: The Royal Square, St Helier
- Coordinates: 49.1836°N 2.1057°W
- Built: 1887
- Architect: Ancell & Orange
- Architectural style: Neoclassical style

The States Building is the meeting place of the States Assembly, the parliament of Jersey. It is located on the south side of the Royal Square, adjacent to Hill Street, in St Helier, Jersey.

== History ==
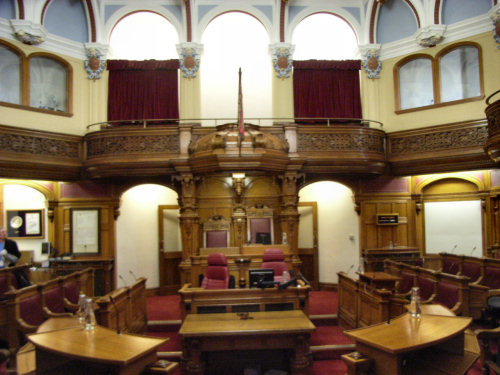
The States Chamber

Following the English Crown's loss of those parts of the Duchy of Normandy that were on the European mainland in 1204, King John decreed that Jersey should continue to be subject to Norman customary law. The Royal Court initially exercised legislative as well as judicial functions for the island from a medieval courthouse in the centre of the south side of the Royal Square. Although the power to make laws moved to the States Assembly in the 15th century, the courtroom was shared by the judges and the legislators. The States Assembly met at Trinity Parish Church during the English Civil War and at Elizabeth Castle during food riots in 1769. Although the courthouse was rebuilt in the second half of the 18th century, it was not until the 1790s that the States Assembly were allowed their own room in the building.

In the early 1870s, the president of the public archives committee, Charles Gruchy, led an initiative to extend the building to the east to create space for a purpose-built chamber for the States Assembly as well as rooms for the bailiff's chambers and judicial greffe (clerk). The extension was designed by the firm of Ancell & Orange in the neoclassical style, built in ashlar stone and was officially opened as part of celebrations for the Golden Jubilee of Queen Victoria by the lieutenant-bailiff, John Picot, on 21 June 1887.

The design involved a symmetrical main frontage of five bays facing onto Halkett Place. The ground floor incorporated a three-bay recessed section which featured an iron gate in the central bay, leading to the public entrance, and balustrades in the adjacent bays. The bays were flanked by Doric order columns and pilasters supporting an entablature with triglyphs. The main frontage was fenestrated by round headed windows in the outer bays on the ground floor and in all bays on the first floor. The first-floor windows were flanked by Corinthian order pilasters supporting a modillioned pediment. Internally, the principal new room was the states chamber in the eastern part of the complex. The complex was extended to the west to create more office space in 1931.

Queen Elizabeth II, accompanied by Prince Philip, Duke of Edinburgh, visited the building and addressed the assembly in July 1957.

A major refurbishment, involving the relocation of the bailiff's offices within the complex and improvements to facilities for states members, was completed in around 2005.
