= States of Jersey Complaints Panel =

Jersey complaint-handling body

Complaint-handling body overview
- Formed: 1982
- Jurisdiction: Jersey
- Complaint-handling body executives: Geoffrey Crill, Chair; Lisa Hart, Greffier of the States
- Website: https://statesassembly.je/appointed-bodies/complaints-panel

The States of Jersey Complaints Panel is a statutory complaint-handling body in Jersey which reviews complaints from the public about ministerial decisions and government maladministration. It is not a public services ombudsperson, although it is recognised by the Ombudsman Association as a “complaint handler member".

== Role and procedure ==
The Panel is governed by the Administrative Decisions (Review) (Jersey) Law 1982. Under the Law, a person who is aggrieved by a decision, act or omission relating to a matter of administration by a Minister, department, or person acting on behalf of a Minister or department, may apply to the Greffier of the States for the matter to be reviewed. The Panel itself is the pool of members from which individual three-member Complaints Boards are constituted to hear complaints.

Members of the Panel are not members of the States Assembly and provide the service on a voluntary basis. Where a complaint is accepted for review, the chair may seek to resolve the matter informally. If a hearing is convened, the complainant and the Minister or department involved are given the opportunity to present their case, after which the Board publishes findings and recommendations.

A Board may request that a Minister, department or person reconsider a matter, but it does not itself substitute a new administrative decision. The relevant Minister is required to respond in the States Assembly to the Board's findings.

The Panel is distinct from the Jersey Commissioner for Standards. The Panel reviews complaints about administrative decisions, acts or omissions by Ministers, departments or officials, while the Commissioner for Standards investigates complaints about the conduct of States Members, Ministers and Assistant Ministers under their codes of conduct.

== Proposed replacement ==
The proposal dates back at least to the 2000 report of the Review Panel on the Machinery of Government in Jersey, known as the Clothier Review, which recommended that an ombudsman should be appointed to hear and determine complaints of maladministration by departments.

The Jersey Law Commission recommended in 2017 that the Complaints Panel should be replaced by a Jersey Public Services Ombudsman.

In 2018, the States Assembly agreed in principle that, subject to further research, a Public Services Ombudsman should be established to replace the existing Complaints Board arrangements. In 2022, the Chief Minister approved law-drafting instructions for legislation to establish a Jersey Public Services Ombudsperson, with the stated objective of resolving complaints about specified public bodies and driving higher standards of public administration.

The proposal was later reconsidered. In 2024, the Chief Minister presented a Jersey Law Commission follow-up report on whether to keep the Complaints Panel or create an ombudsperson.

In 2026, a further Government report supported the introduction of a new Public Sector Ombudsperson and recommended that a road map for implementation be developed, while also recording the Council of Ministers' thanks for the work of the volunteer members of the Complaints Panel.

== See also ==
- Government of Jersey
- States Assembly
- Law of Jersey
- Administrative law
