= Greffier =

Clerk to a legislature or to a court

A greffier is an official who acts as the clerk or registrar of a court or legislature in France and in some jurisdictions influenced by French legal terminology. In courts, greffiers maintain the official record of proceedings, assist judges at hearings and authenticate judicial acts. The related term greffe denotes the registry or administrative office of a court, where judicial records are kept and procedural documents are received.

The title remains in official use in the Channel Islands. In Guernsey, His Majesty's Greffier has judicial and registration functions and is also the statutory clerk and registrar of the States of Deliberation. Jersey has separate offices of Greffier of the States, who serves as clerk to the States Assembly, and Judicial Greffier, who performs the duties of clerk to the Island's courts and judicial tribunals.

== Guernsey ==
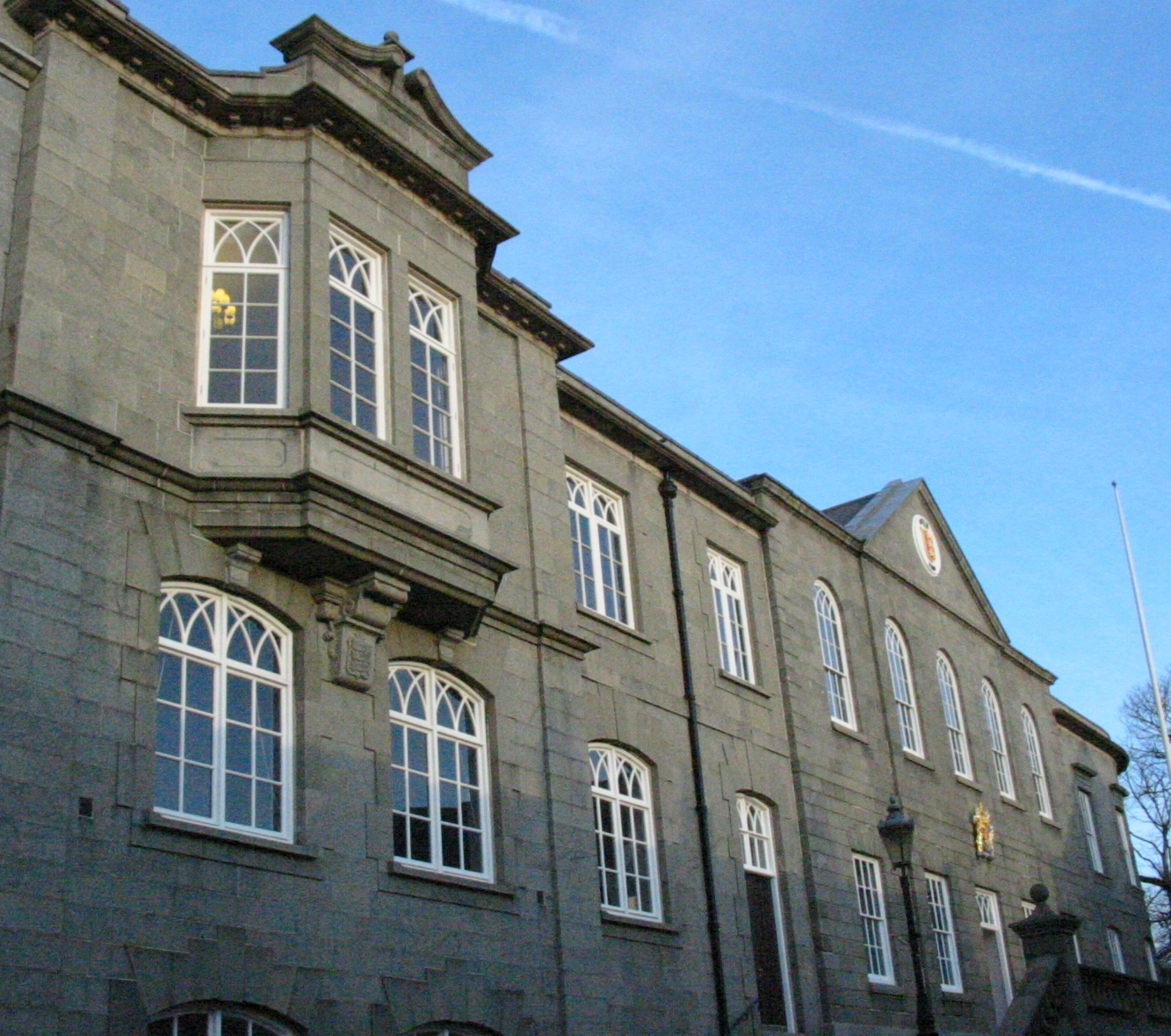
The Royal Court House in St Peter Port, where HM Greffier is based.

In Guernsey, His Majesty's Greffier is the clerk of the Royal and Magistrate's Courts and performs a range of judicial and registration functions. The Reform (Guernsey) Law 1948 also designates HM Greffier as clerk and registrar of the States of Deliberation and the States of Election.

In 2020, HM Greffier delegated the parliamentary functions to a separately appointed States' Greffier, although HM Greffier remains the statutory clerk to the States.

The following table lists holders of the office of HM Greffier since 1945.

Name	Dates	Brief biographical detail
A. J. Roussel	In office in 1945; succeeded by 1948	Held office during the German occupation and the immediate post-war period.
James E. Le Page	In office by 1948; succeeded in 1958	Previously served as Deputy Greffier.
Roy Henry Videlo	29 November 1958 – 31 July 1981	Served both the Royal Court and the States of Deliberation, including as clerk to the States.
Ken Tough	1981–2011	A historian of the German occupation who was responsible for the Royal Court archives; he was appointed an OBE in 2012.
Jon Torode	August 2011 – 14 March 2025	Previously worked in insurance administration, customs and immigration, and sea fisheries. During his tenure, the courts underwent digitalisation and a separate States' Greffier was appointed.
Antonia Read	28 April 2025 – present	The first woman to hold the office. She previously served in Guernsey Police, becoming a detective chief inspector and Director of the Financial Intelligence Service.

== Jersey ==
In 1931, the previously combined office of Greffier was divided into the Judicial Greffier, responsible for the courts, and Greffier of the States, responsible for the work of the legislature. In a 2011 States Assembly debate, former Judicial Greffier Senator Ian Le Marquand said that he believed the division of the office in 1931 had been “purely administrative” rather than for constitutional reasons.

=== Judicial Greffier ===
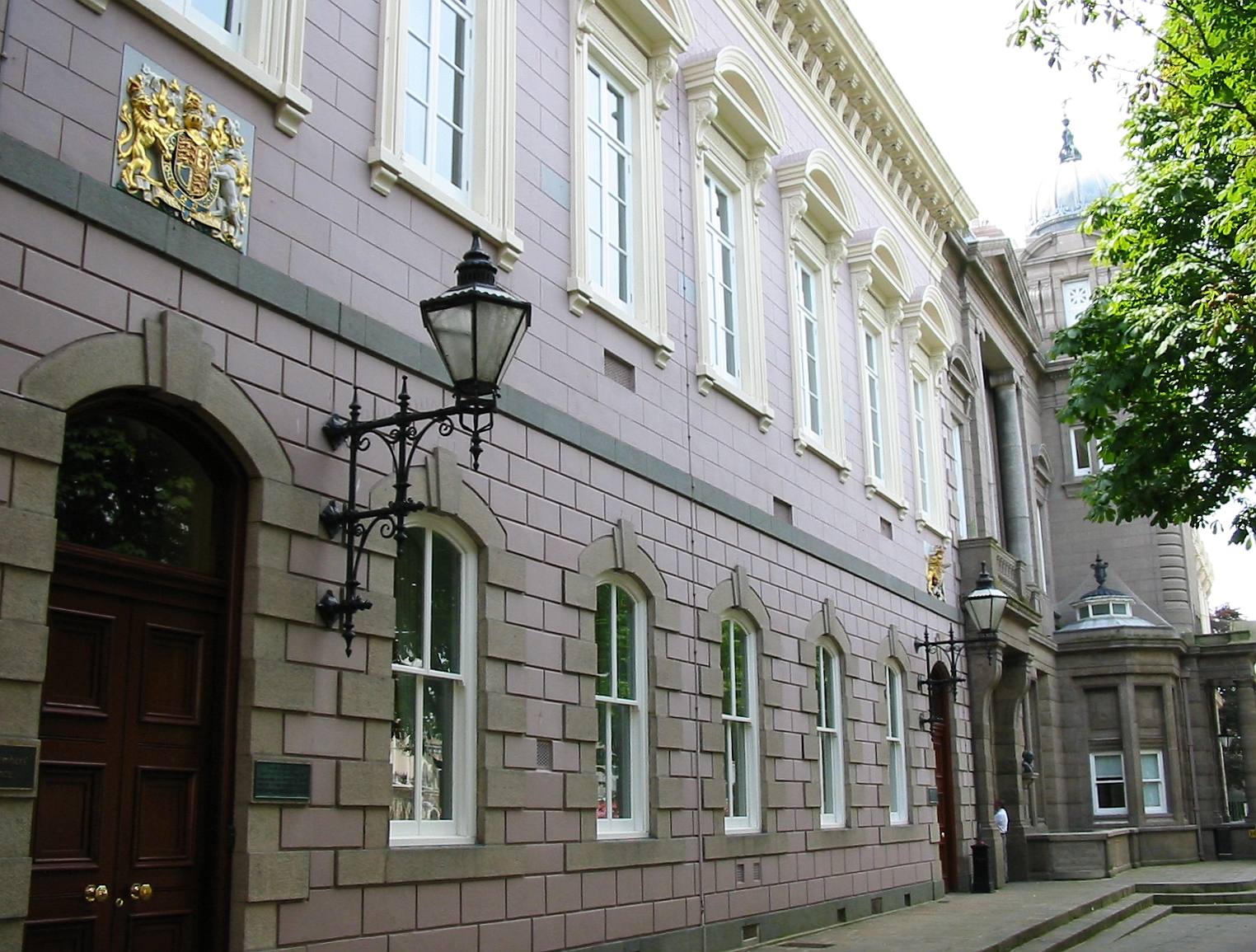
Royal Court House, St Helier, where the Judicial Greffe is based.

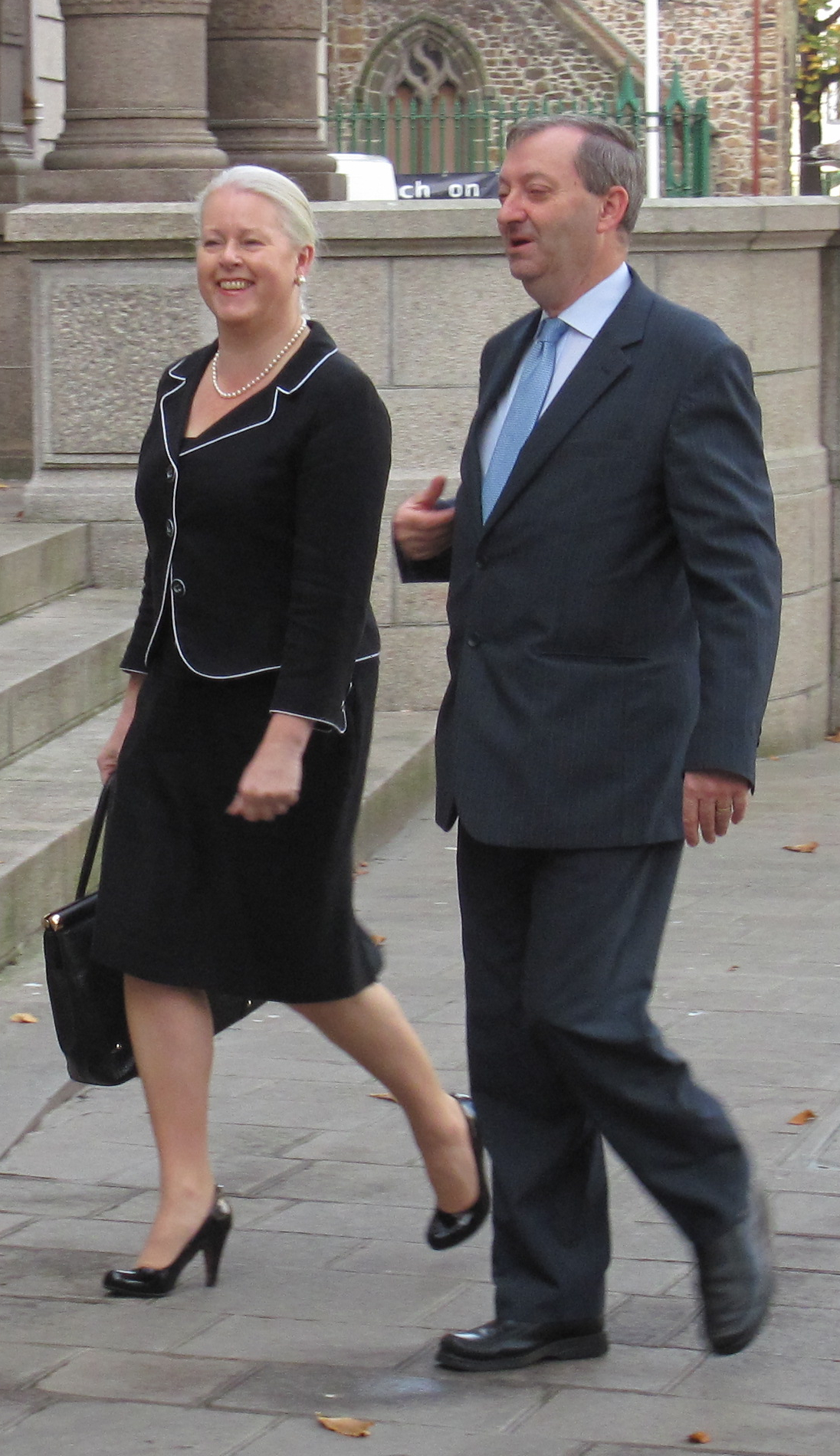
Ian Le Marquand (right), Judicial Greffier from 1990 to 1997, pictured in 2011.

The Judicial Greffier is the clerk or registrar of the Royal Court and the other courts and judicial tribunals of the Island. The Judicial Greffier, Deputy Judicial Greffier or a Greffier Substitute attends their sittings, records and authenticates their acts and decisions, and enters them in the appropriate registers. The Judicial Greffe provides administrative support to the Island's courts and to tribunals dealing with matters including employment and discrimination, social security, mental health and planning.

The office also performs a number of registration functions. The Judicial Greffier maintains the register of political parties, entering parties following an order of the Royal Court and retaining their constitutions and accounts. Other responsibilities of the Judicial Greffe include land, wills and intellectual-property registrations.

The following table lists holders of the office of Judicial Greffier since 1945.

Name	Dates	Brief biographical detail
A. J. P. Le Riche	In office in 1945; succeeded by 1950	Held office during the German occupation and the immediate post-war period.
Philip Edgar Le Couteur	1950; still in office in 1968	An advocate and legal scholar who compiled the index to Charles de Gruchy's work on Jersey customary law.
J. W. Bisson	In office by 1969; retired in 1971–72	Previously served as Deputy Judicial Greffier.
Thomas A. Dorey	1972–1982	An advocate who resigned following a dispute over pay negotiations. He later served as Sous-Magistrat and Magistrate.
Vincent James Obbard	In office by 1984; succeeded in 1990	An advocate who later served as Registrar of the Family Division of the Royal Court; he is also Seigneur of Samarès.
Ian Le Marquand	1990–1997	An advocate who subsequently became Master of the Royal Court, Magistrate, and an elected member of the States Assembly as Senator and Minister for Home Affairs.
Michael Wilkins	1997–2015	Also served as Viscount of the Royal Court, having held that office since 1981.
Paul Matthews	2015–2018	Served as Deputy Judicial Greffier from 2001 before succeeding Wilkins.
Adam Clarke	2018–2023	An advocate and former managing partner of Le Gallais & Luce; he left the office to become Assistant Magistrate.
Rebecca Morley-Kirk	2023–present	An advocate and former chair of the Mental Health Review Tribunal; she is the first woman to hold the office.

=== Greffier of the States ===
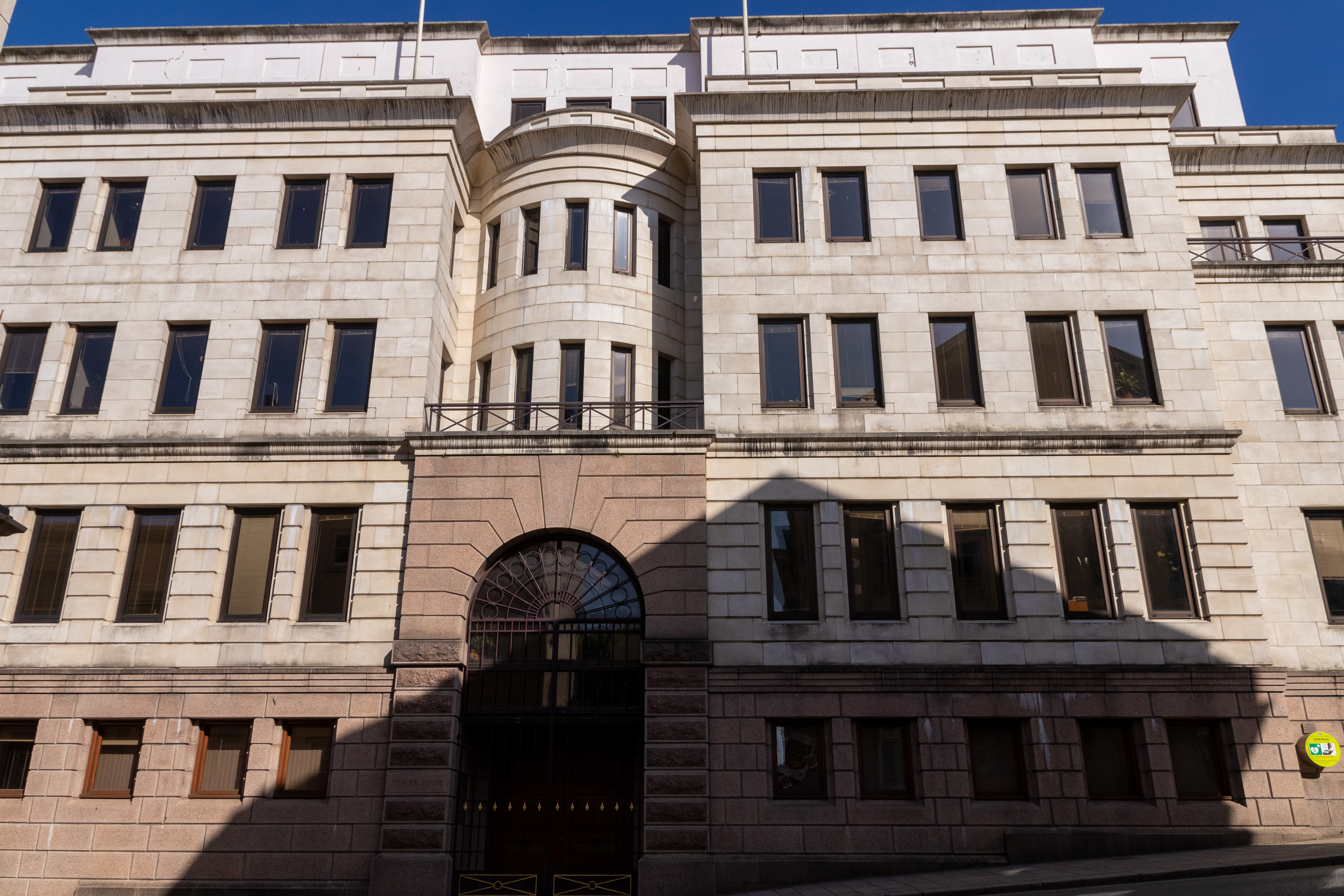
Morier House in St Helier, where the States Greffe is based.

The Greffier of the States is clerk of the States Assembly and head of the States Greffe. The Greffier appoints and supervises Greffe officers, subject in some cases to the consent of the Bailiff; those officers are not subject to direction by Ministers or the Government's Chief Executive in carrying out their Greffe duties. The Greffier is also responsible for maintaining and authenticating parliamentary records, safeguarding parliamentary privilege, arranging the publication of legislation and laying certain statutory reports before the Assembly.

Legislation assigns the Greffier several additional functions. These include administering the States of Jersey Complaints Panel process that determines complaints against ministers and Government of Jersey departments; serving as an ex officio member of the Jersey Electoral Authority; acting as clerk to the Electoral College which appoints Jurats; and participating in the appointment of the independent reviewer of elected members' remuneration. The Greffier also has custody of the formal minutes of the Council of Ministers and may be appointed to preside over the Assembly when neither the Bailiff nor Deputy Bailiff is available.

The States Greffe is the States Assembly’s independent parliamentary administration, comprising the Greffier, Deputy Greffier and their officers. It provides procedural and administrative support to the Assembly, its committees and scrutiny panels, and maintains its official records. The form States’ Greffe appeared historically, but the Privileges and Procedures Committee agreed in 2003 that the apostrophe—apparently introduced through translation from French—should be removed. Propositions presented to the States are described as "lodged au Greffe".

From 1946 until 1992, the offices of Greffier of the States and Law Draftsman were held by the same person. The arrangement began when Francis de Lisle Bois, Jersey's first Law Draftsman, became Greffier while retaining his drafting office.

The following table lists the Greffiers of the States from the office-holder in 1945.

Name	Dates	Brief biographical detail
Hedley Le Riche Edwards	In office in 1945; succeeded in 1946	Held office during the German occupation and the immediate post-war period.
Francis de Lisle Bois	1946–1962	An advocate and Jersey's first Law Draftsman; he became Deputy Bailiff in 1962. Author of A Constitutional History of Jersey (1972)
Alfred Durell Le Brocq	1963–1971	Joined the States Greffe in 1947 and became Deputy Greffier in 1955; he later served as an elected member of the Assembly as Deputy for St John.
Edward James MacGregor Potter	1971–1990	A barrister who also served as Law Draftsman; he was elected a Jurat after his retirement.
Ronald Stanley Gray	1991–1992	Previously served as Deputy Greffier.
Geoffrey Henry Charles Coppock	1992–2000	Previously served as Law Draftsman; his appointment ended the practice of combining the two offices.
Catherine Mary Newcombe	2000–2002	Joined the States Greffe in 1968 and became the first woman to serve as Greffier; she was later elected a Jurat.
Michael Nelson de la Haye	2002–2015	Previously served as Deputy Greffier and was appointed an OBE.
Mark Egan	2015–2022	A former House of Commons clerk.
Lisa-Marie Hart	2022–present	Joined the States Greffe in 2000 and served as Assistant Greffier and Deputy Greffier before her appointment.

== France ==
The greffiers are responsible for the records of the courts. A judicial document is not valid without a greffier's signature. They also have some responsibilities for evidence.
