= Tourism in Jersey =

Tourism is a significant part of Jersey's economy, although its relative importance has declined over the years.

== History ==
Jersey saw a boom in tourism during the post-World War II years, but its history of tourism dates back much further. This boom has been winding down since the late-1980s. Many of the larger hotels, which were constructed during the boom, have now been demolished.

During the COVID-19 pandemic, Jersey experienced a successful tourism season in 2021 as UK visitors viewed the island as a safe travel destination during a period of uncertainty over international travel, with 'unusually high' bookings in October. However, that same year the island experienced a lack of hospitality staff, making business challenging for enterprises in the sector.

== Economic statistics ==
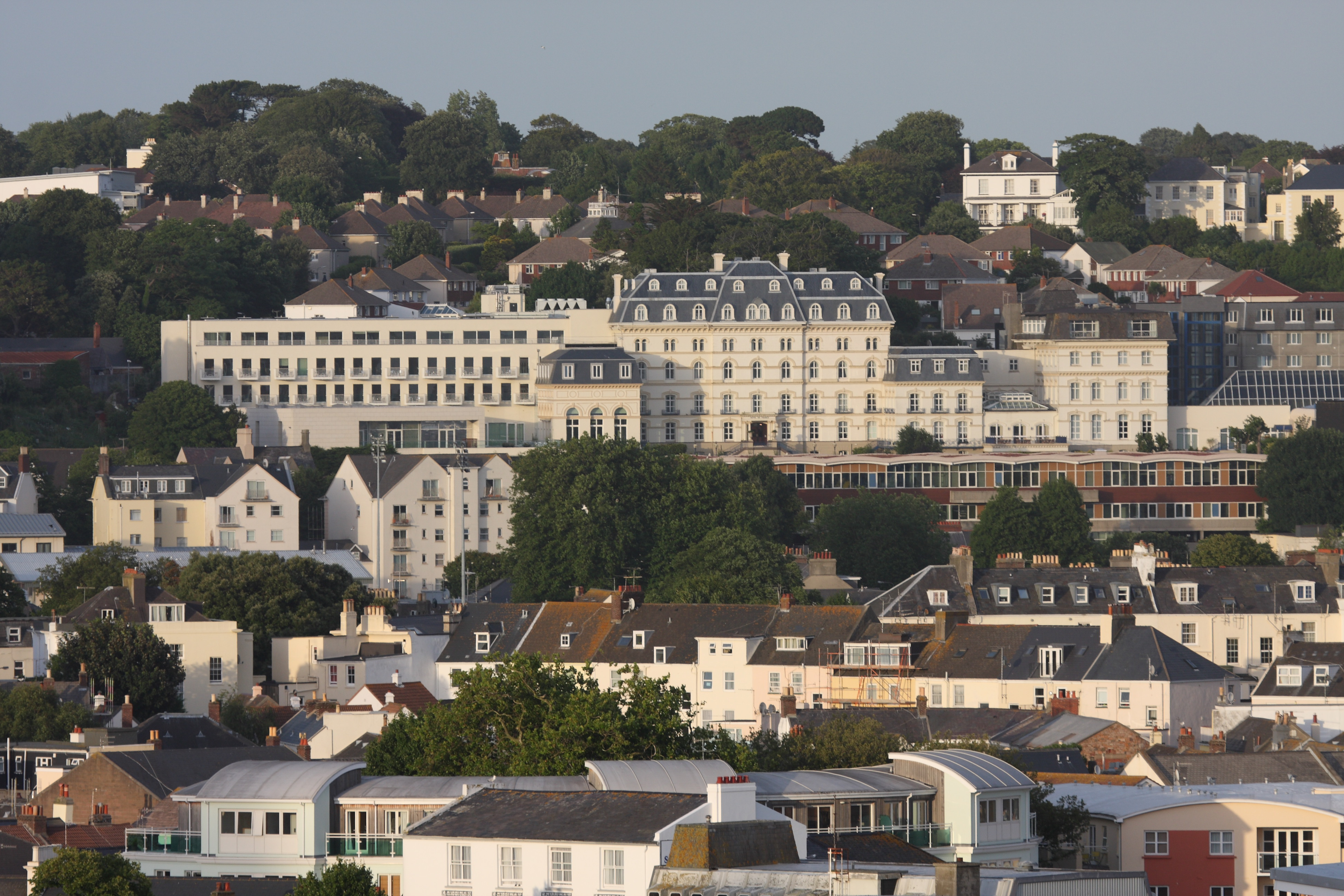
Hotel de France

Hospitality (hotels, restaurants and bars) made up 4.2% of Jersey's GVA in 2019. It is estimated that the wider contribution of tourism in particular is 8.3% (2017). Tourism is important for Jersey's taxation, making £12.5 million in GST (15% of the total). However, total spend is much higher, around £250 million. This creates 6,470 jobs.

In 2017, the total number of visits increased by 5% to 726,800, of which 580,000 were considered "Holiday visits". The total number of visitors has declined since 1997. In 1997, Jersey had 985,000 visitors. Jersey tends to attract visitors from an older demographic than average, with the average age of UK leisure visitors being 57.

Travel to Jersey is very seasonal. Accommodation occupancy is much higher in the summer months, especially August, than in the winter months (with a low in November). The majority of visitors to the island arrive by air from the UK, however access is also possible by ferry. Air links to mainland Europe are not as good as those to the UK. There are calls from some, including St Helier Constable Simon Crowcroft, for the island to increase attractiveness to cruise liners, however this would require investment in a deep water berth, which the island currently lacks. Air routes are subsidised by the States of Jersey. Exact figures for subsidies are not in the public domain.

== Attractions ==
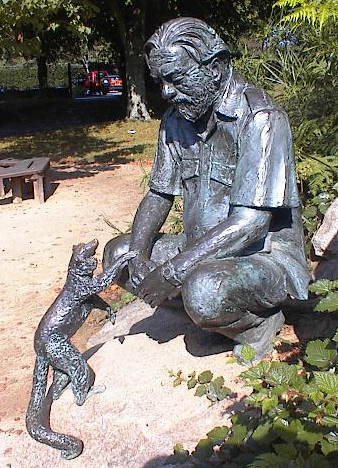
A statue of Gerald Durrell at Jersey Zoo

Most tourist attractions are operated by private companies and nonprofit organisations, including companies owned, or funded by the States of Jersey. Elizabeth Castle, for example, is controlled by Jersey Heritage. Some other attractions are owned by the National Trust for Jersey. One notable attraction is Jersey Zoo in Trinity, a wildlife park founded by conservationist Gerald Durrell.

== Hotels ==
Notable hotels include:

- the Pomme d'Or overlooking Liberation Square in St. Helier, which during the occupation served as the German Navy Headquarters and from whose balcony the Liberation force raised the Union Flag on Liberation Day, 9 May 1945;
- the Hotel de France, formerly the Imperial and the Jesuit college, in St. Saviour overlooking the town of St. Helier;
- Atlantic Hotel, St. Brelade
- Château La Chaire, Rozel Bay
- Longueville Manor, St. Saviour
- Ommaroo Hotel, Saint Helier
- Royal Yacht Hotel, Saint Helier
- St. Brelade's Bay Hotel, St. Brelade
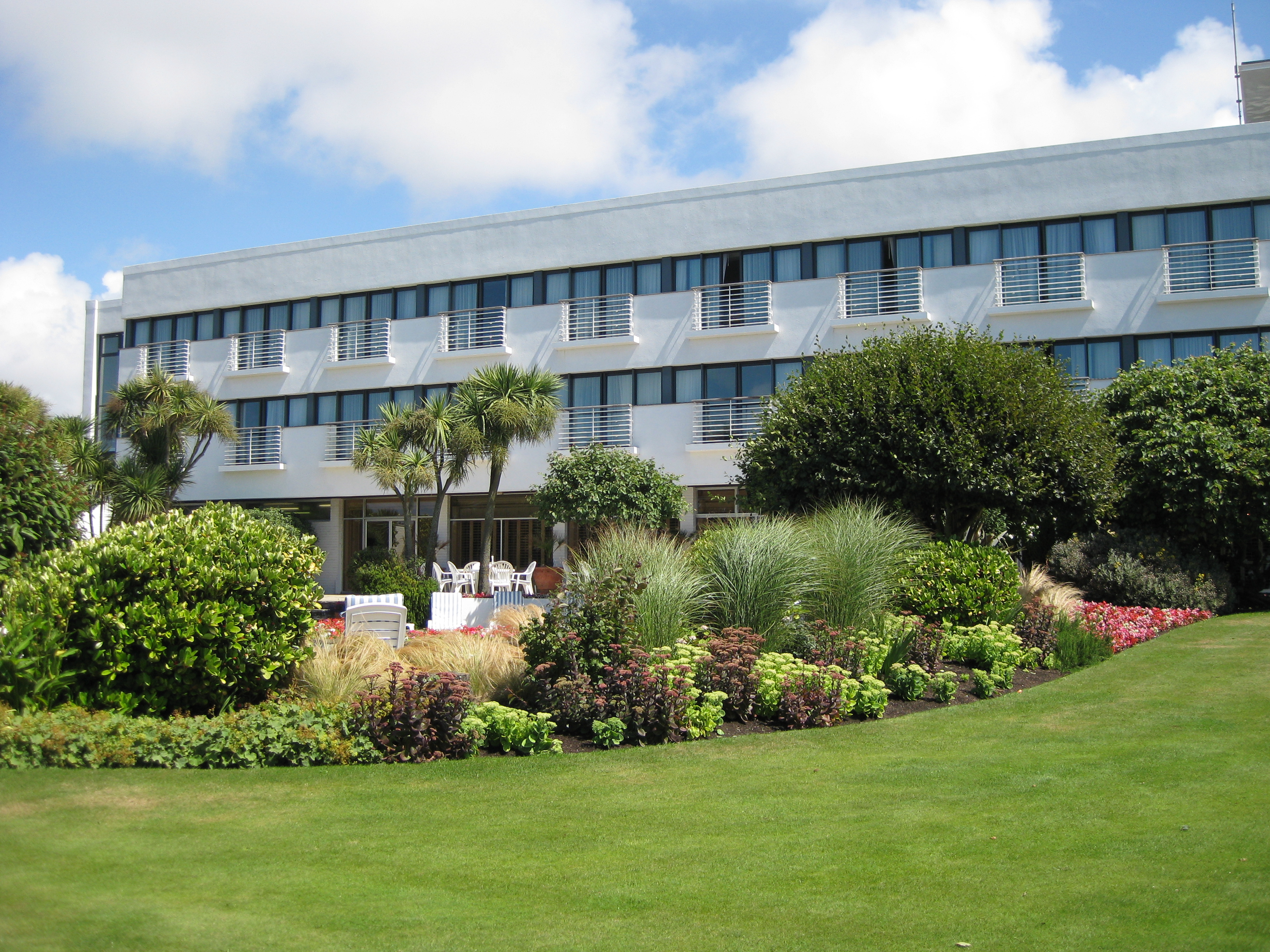
Atlantic Hotel (Jersey)

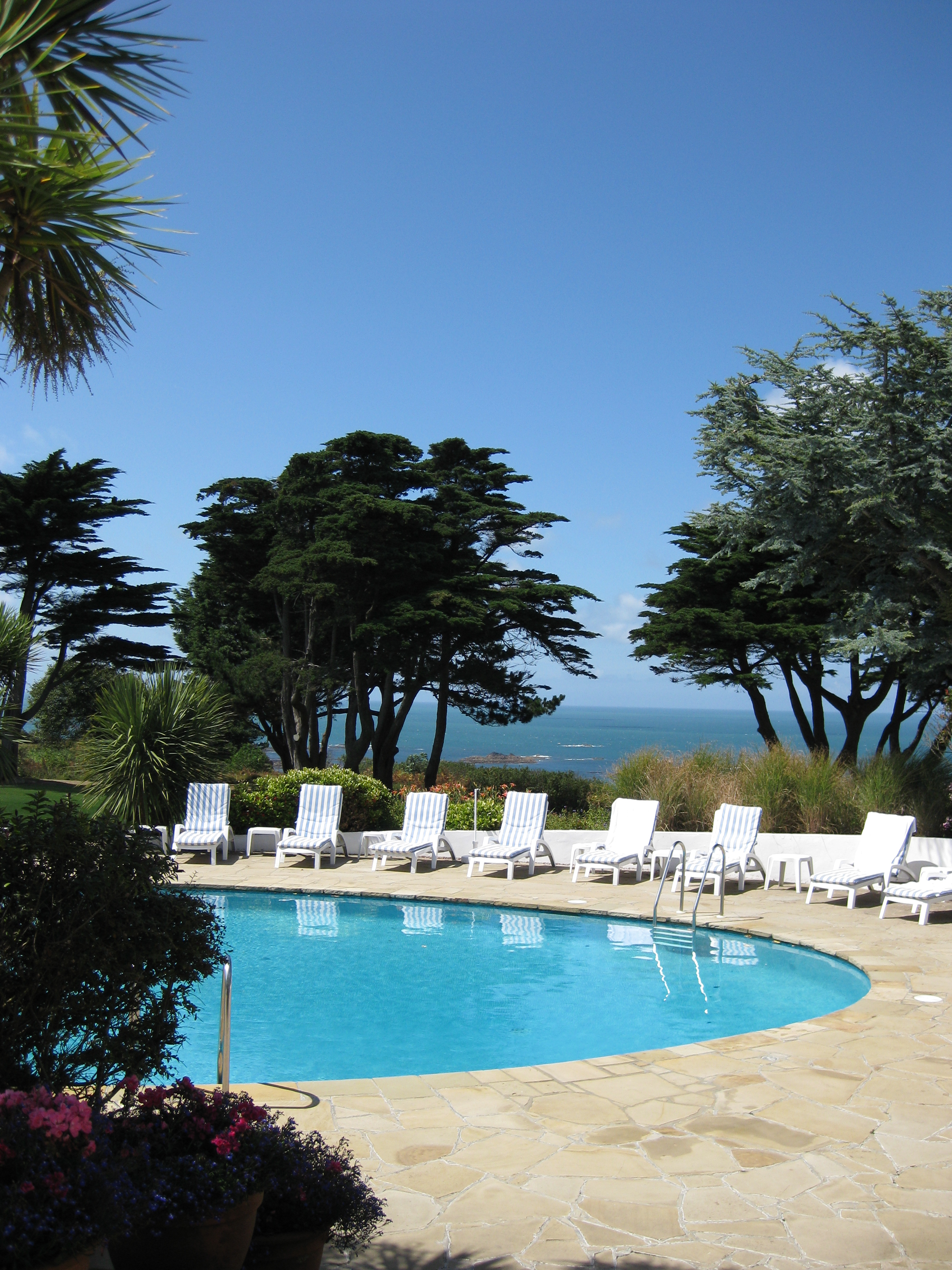
Atlantic Hotel pool

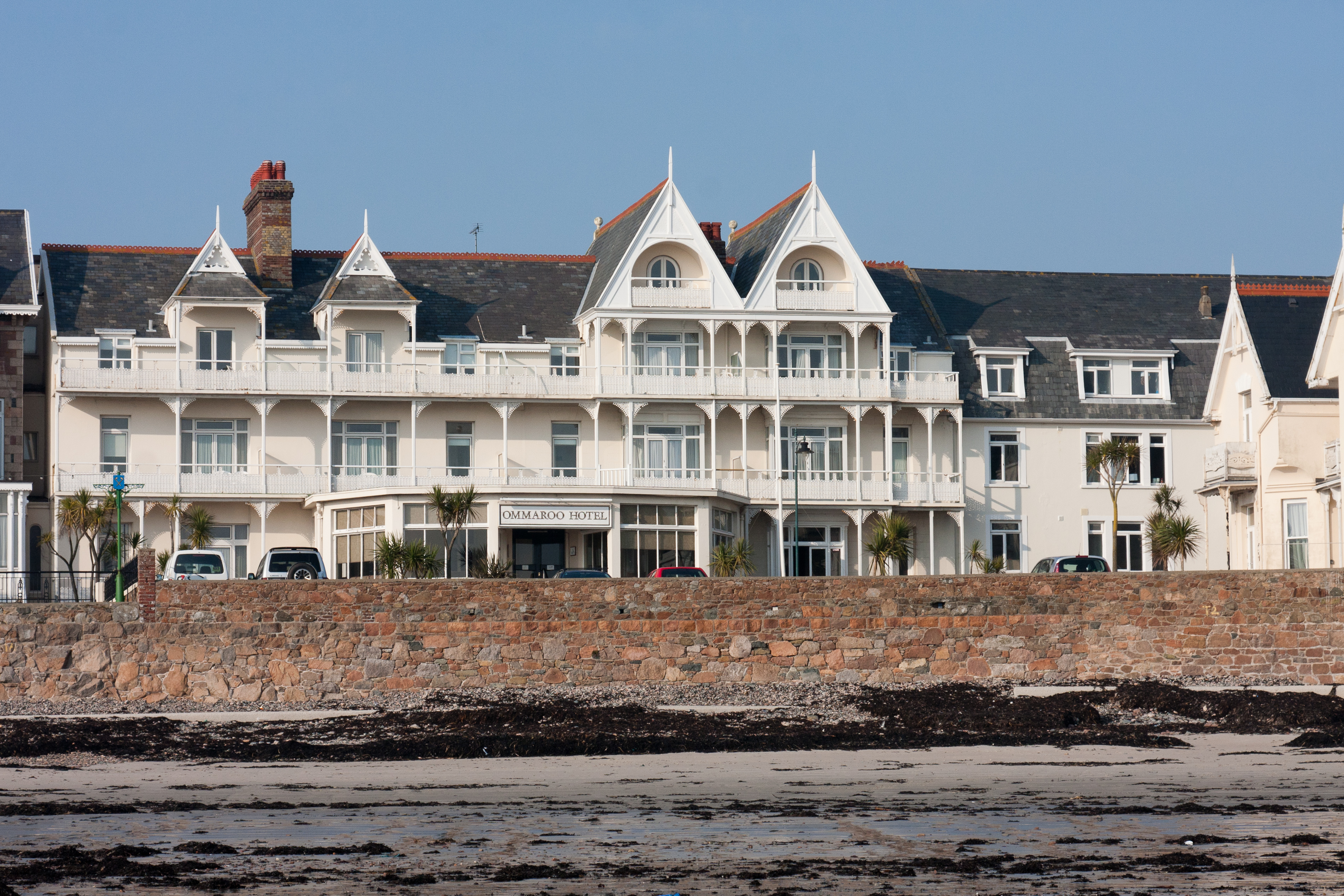
Ommaroo Hotel

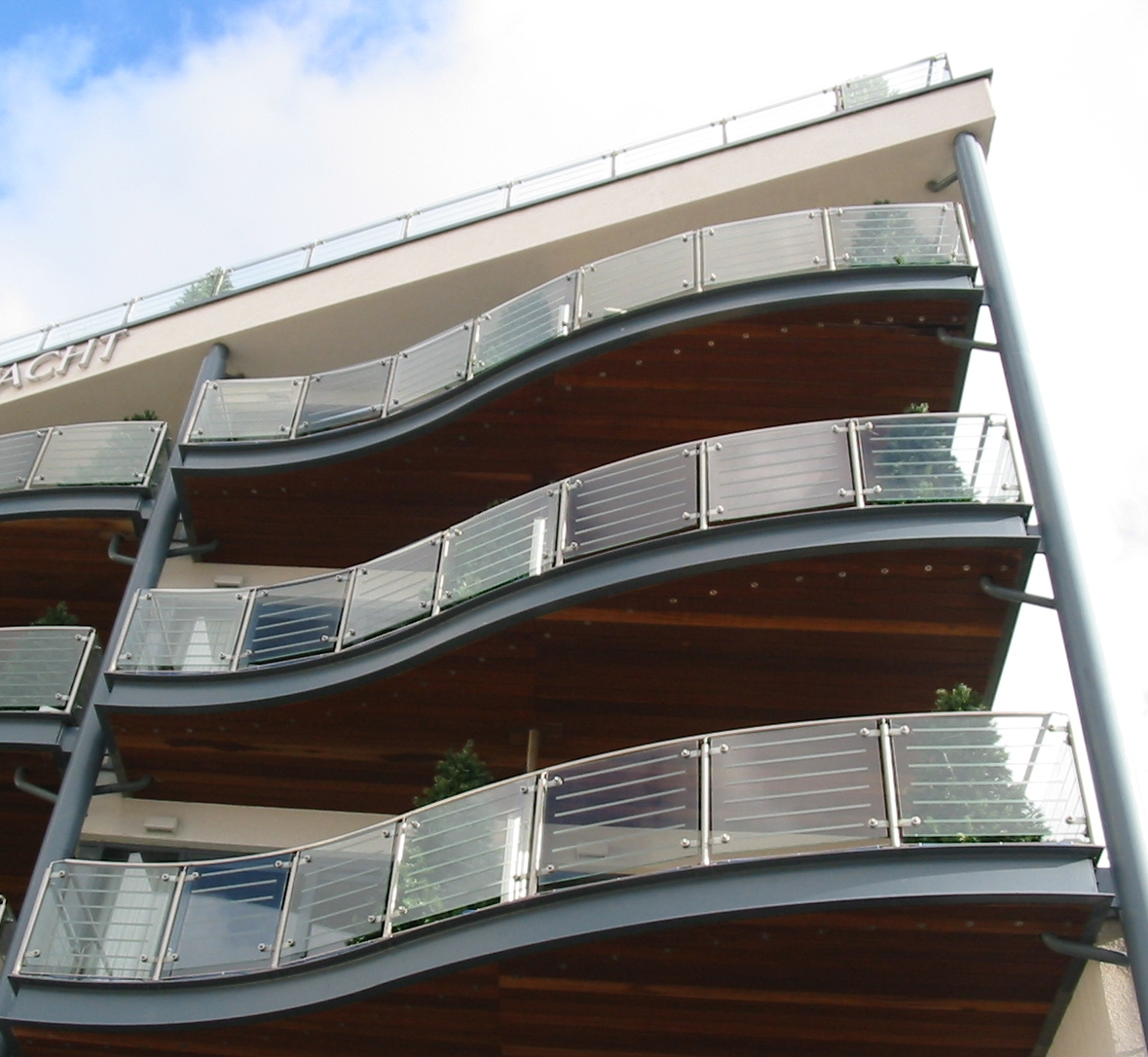
Royal Yacht Hotel
