= Bob Hill (politician) =

Jersey politician

Frederick John Hill BEM

Deputy
- In office 1993–2011
- Succeeded by: Steve Luce
- Constituency: St Martin, Jersey

Personal details
- Born: 31 October 1940 (age 85) Jersey
- Spouse: Ann Christine (Whiting)
- Occupation: Retired police officer
- Website: https://bobhilljersey.blogspot.com/

Frederick John Hill (born 31 October 1940), known as Bob Hill, is a former Jersey politician and human rights campaigner. For 18 years he was Deputy for the parish of St Martin in the States Assembly.

== Biography ==
Hill was born in the parish of St Martin and attended Saint Martin's Elementary School. At the age of 20, he left the island to join the Metropolitan Police in London where during 31 years of service he worked in the East End of London and Brixton. He returned to Jersey in 1991.

== States of Jersey ==
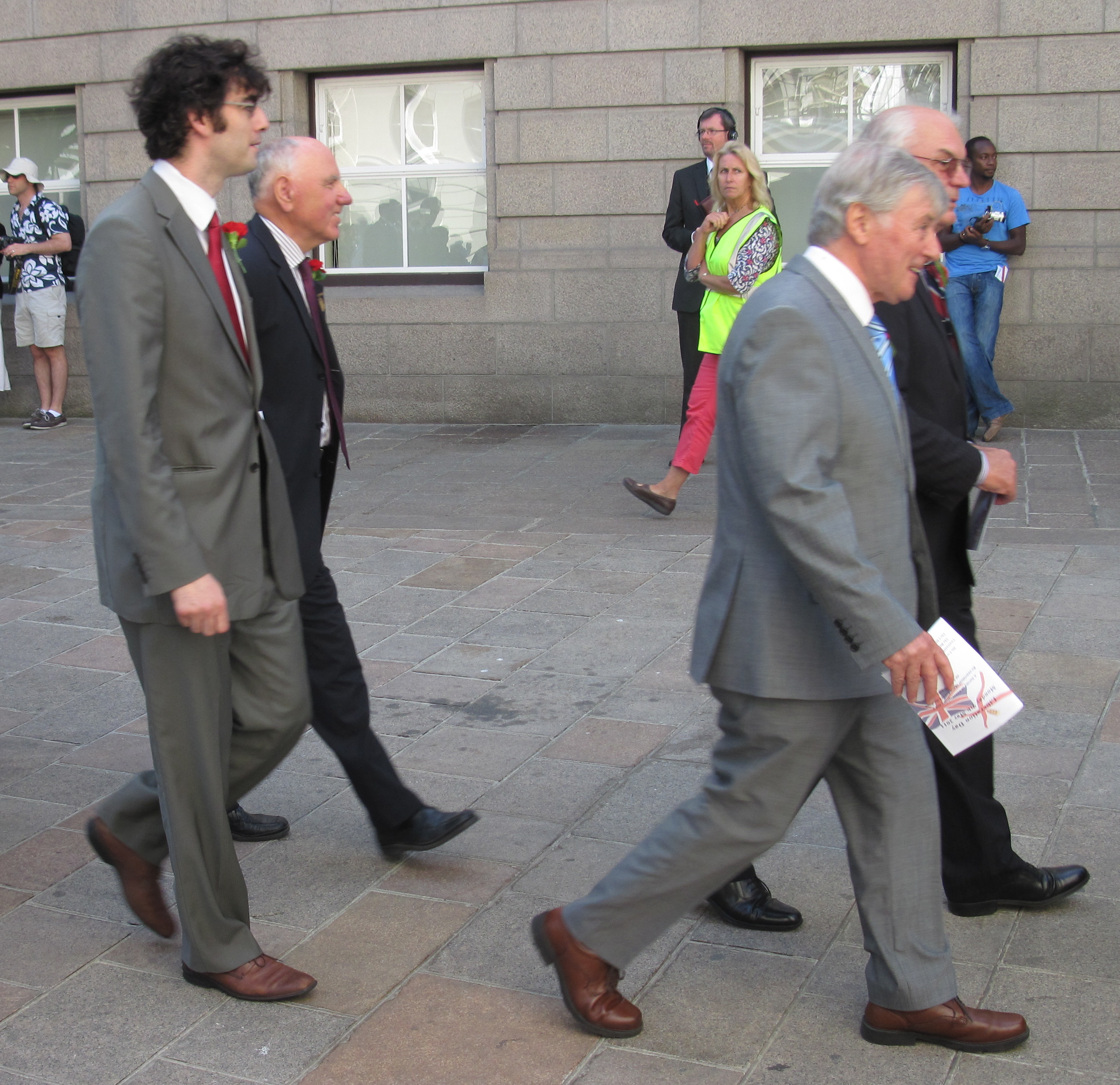
Bob Hill (2nd from left) in procession, Liberation Day 2011

In 2005 to 2007, Hill chaired the States of Jersey Social Affairs scrutiny panel. An inquiry by the panel into the role of centeniers in the Magistrate's Court led to the Hill's resignation as chairman over his plans to publish a legal opinion on the compatibility of practice in the Jersey court with the Convention right to a fair trial. The panel continued with the inquiry, publishing a report that quickly led to reforms in court procedures.

Hill called for the States of Jersey assembly to establish an official body to have oversight of the operation of the Human Rights (Jersey) Law 2000. When this proposal failed, Hill set up the unofficial Jersey Human Rights Group in 2009. He campaigned on other human rights issues, including prisoners' rights.

Hill successfully proposed an inquiry into the constitutional role of the Bailiff and other Crown officers who are unelected members of the States of Jersey assembly. A panel, chaired by Lord Carswell, reported in 2010 making far-reaching recommendations for reform.

In 2009, Hill successfully campaigned for reforms in the handling of public sector employees who are suspended from work in Jersey. His proposal for full public inquiry into the suspension of Jersey's chief of police, Graham Power, in relation to the major investigation into historic child abuse, failed though an internal inquiry found that there had been procedural irregularities.

In 2011, the States' assembly rejected Hill's proposals make it easier for people to claim compensation for injuries caused by badly maintained roads.

== Electoral history ==
He was elected as Deputy of St Martin in six successive elections between 1993 and 2008. He failed to win re-election in October 2011.

== Honours ==
Hill was awarded the British Empire Medal in 1991.
