= Jersey Law Commission =

Law reform body in Jersey

- Formation: 1996
- Founder: States Assembly
- Type: Law reform advisory body
- Purpose: Review and recommend reforms to the law of Jersey
- Location: Jersey
- Region served: Jersey
- Members: Chair and seven law commissioners
- Parent organization: Government of Jersey
- Website: www.gov.je/government/howgovernmentworks/advisorygroups/jerseylawcommission/Pages/home.aspx

The Jersey Law Commission is an independent advisory body that reviews the law of Jersey and recommends reforms. It was established by the States Assembly in 1996 following a proposition lodged by the Legislation Committee.

The Commission's role is to identify areas of Jersey law that should be examined with a view to development and reform, including the removal of anomalies, the repeal of obsolete or unnecessary enactments, reducing the number of separate enactments, and simplifying and modernising the law. It considers proposals for law reform, prepares work programmes, consults on approved projects and publishes consultation papers and final reports.

== Organisation and work ==
The Commission is made up of a chair and seven law commissioners. Commissioners are appointed following a recruitment process overseen by the Jersey Appointments Commission, on the recommendation of the Chief Minister of Jersey and with the approval of the States Assembly. Commissioners usually serve three-year terms and are volunteers.

Its annual work programme is submitted to the Legislation Advisory Panel, and its budget is provided through the Chief Minister's Office.

The Commission has considered subjects including property law, contract law and tutelles. Later projects have included administrative redress and public-sector complaints, human rights, and divorce law reform.

== See also ==
- Law of Jersey
- States Assembly
- Government of Jersey
