= States Assembly =

Parliament of Jersey, a British Crown Dependency

Coordinates: 49.18365°N 2.10520°W

States Assembly Assemblée des États (French) Êtats d'Jèrri (Jèrriais)
- Logo of the States Assembly

Type
- Type: Unicameral
- Sovereign: Monarch of the United Kingdom

History
- Founded: c. 1497
- Preceded by: Royal Court

Leadership
- Bailiff: Robert MacRae since 24 October 2025
- Deputy Bailiff: Mark Temple since 20 January 2026
- Chief Minister: Lyndon Farnham, Independent since 19 June 2026
- Deputy Chief Minister: Tom Binet, Independent since 2 February 2024
- Chief Scrutineer: Karen Wilson, Independent since 14 July 2026

Structure
- Seats: 54 members in law; 49 elected voting members; 5 statutory non-voting members
- Political groups: Elected members (49): Independents (42) (Note: Six independent members were associated with or endorsed by Value Jersey, which was not registered as a political party at the 2026 election.); Reform Jersey (7); Non-voting members (5): Bailiff (1); Lieutenant-Governor (1); Dean (1); Attorney General (1); Solicitor General (1)
- Length of term: Four years
- Salary: £59,874.72 per year (from 1 October 2025)

Elections
- Voting system: Plurality block voting (Senators); First-past-the-post (Connétables); Plurality block voting (Deputies)
- Last election: 7 June 2026
- Next election: 2030

Meeting place
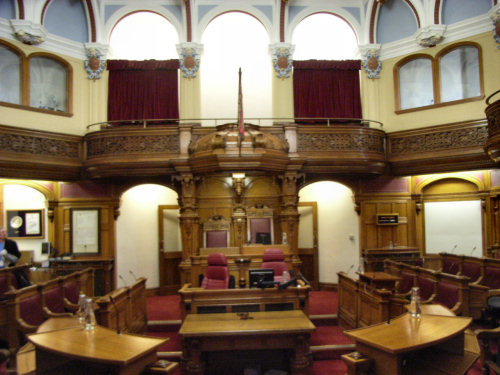
- The States Chamber in the States Building
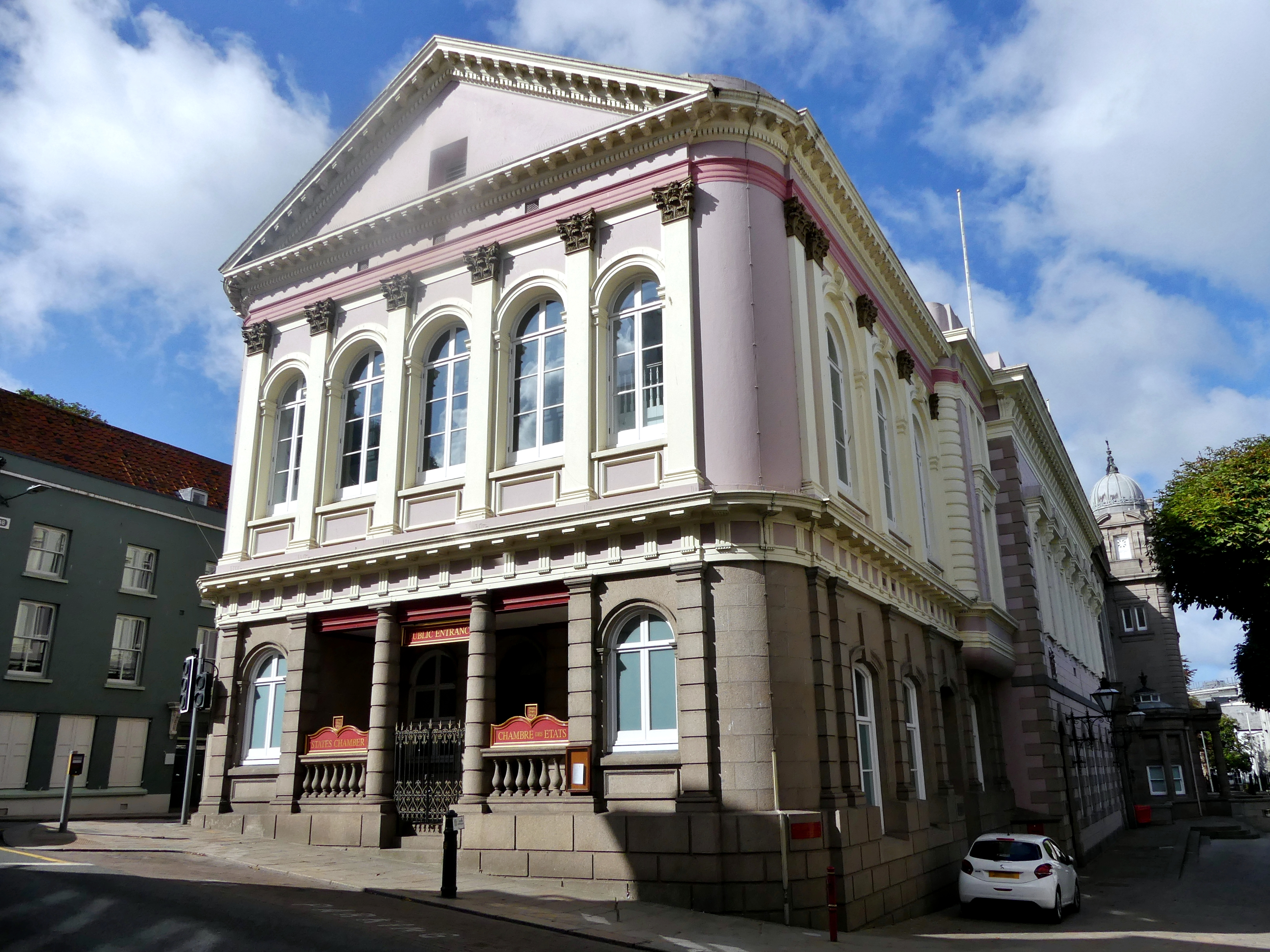
- States Building, St Helier

Website
- statesassembly.je

Constitution
- States of Jersey Law 2005

Rules
- Standing Orders of the States of Jersey

The States Assembly (French: Assemblée des États; Jèrriais: Êtats d'Jèrri) is the parliament of Jersey. Under the States of Jersey Law 2005, the Assembly has 54 members, of whom 49 are elected and entitled to vote. Since the 2026 general election, the elected members have comprised nine senators elected island-wide, 28 deputies elected from nine constituencies, and the connétable of each of the twelve parishes. The remaining five members hold statutory non-voting constitutional or Crown offices.

The origins of the legislature of Jersey lie in the system of self-government according to Norman law guaranteed to the Channel Islands by John, King of England, following the division of Normandy in 1204. The States Assembly has exercised uncontested legislative powers since 1771, when the concurrent law-making power of the Royal Court of Jersey was abolished.

The Assembly passes and amends laws and regulations; approves the annual budget and taxation; appoints the chief minister, ministers and members of various committees and panels; debates matters proposed by the Council of Ministers, by individual States Members or by one of the committees or panels. Members ask questions to discover information and to hold ministers to account.

Executive powers are exercised by the Government of Jersey, led by the Chief Minister and the Council of Ministers. Under the States of Jersey Law 2005, the Council consists of the Chief Minister and at least seven other ministers, all selected by the Assembly from among its elected members. Ministers are accountable to the Assembly for the exercise of their functions.

== History ==
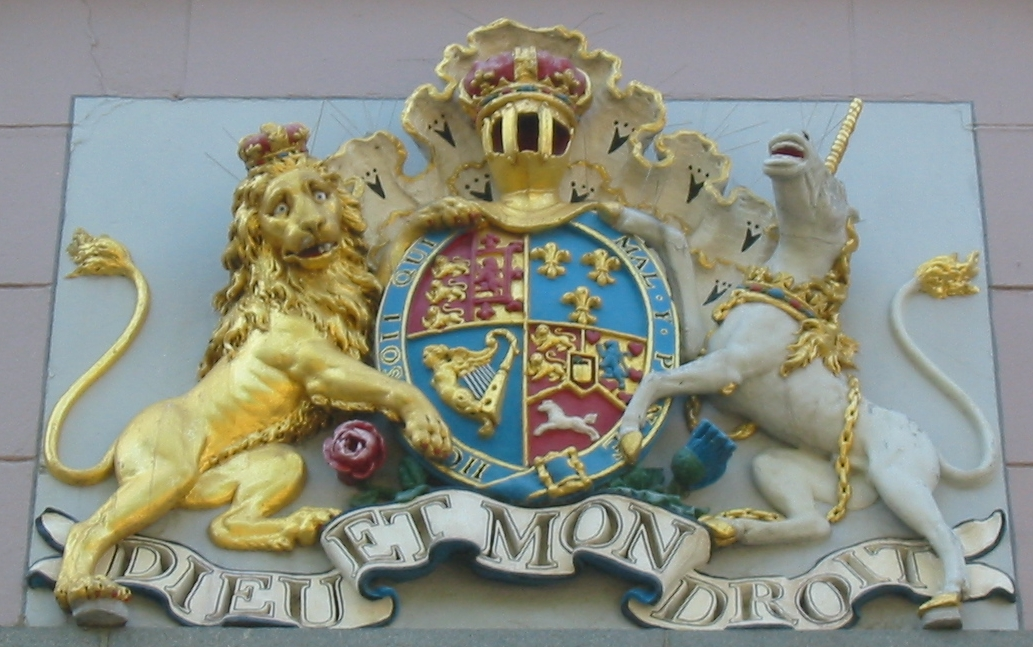
Royal coat of arms (Hanoverian) on the States building in St. Helier

=== Establishment ===
The legislature derives its name from the estates (French: états) of the Crown (represented by the Bailiff and Jurats), the Church (the rectors of the parishes) and the people (represented by the connétables) from whom the Assembly was originally summoned. Today, the three estates still exist; however, all three now represent the island population (through the island, the parishes and their districts).

Jersey's political history begins as part of the Duchy of Normandy. However, when the King of France stripped King John of England of the title ‘Duke of Normandy’, the people of Jersey and the other Channel Islands rebelled against the French king, maintaining the sovereignty of the 'rightful' duke.

In 1259, Henry III signed the Treaty of Paris, resigning his claim to the Duchy of Normandy except the Channel Islands. The Channel Islands were not absorbed into the Kingdom of England but two offices were appointed; the Warden (the Monarch's representative) and the Bailiff. Other sources state that the Bailiff was in fact appointed initially by the Warden in 1235.

The existing Norman customs and laws were allowed to continue and there was no attempt to introduce English law. The formerly split administrative system was replaced with a centralised legal system (the basis of the 'States'), of which the head was the King of England rather than the Duke of Normandy. The law was conducted through 12 jurats, constables (connétable) and a bailiff (Baillé).

The role of the Jurats when the King's court was mobile would have been preparatory work for the visit of the Justices in Eyre. It is unknown for how long the position of the Jurats has existed, with some claiming the position dates to time immemorial. After the cessation of the visits of the Justices in Eyre (and with the frequent absence of the Warden), the Bailiff and Jurats took on a much wider role, from jury to justice.^{:28}

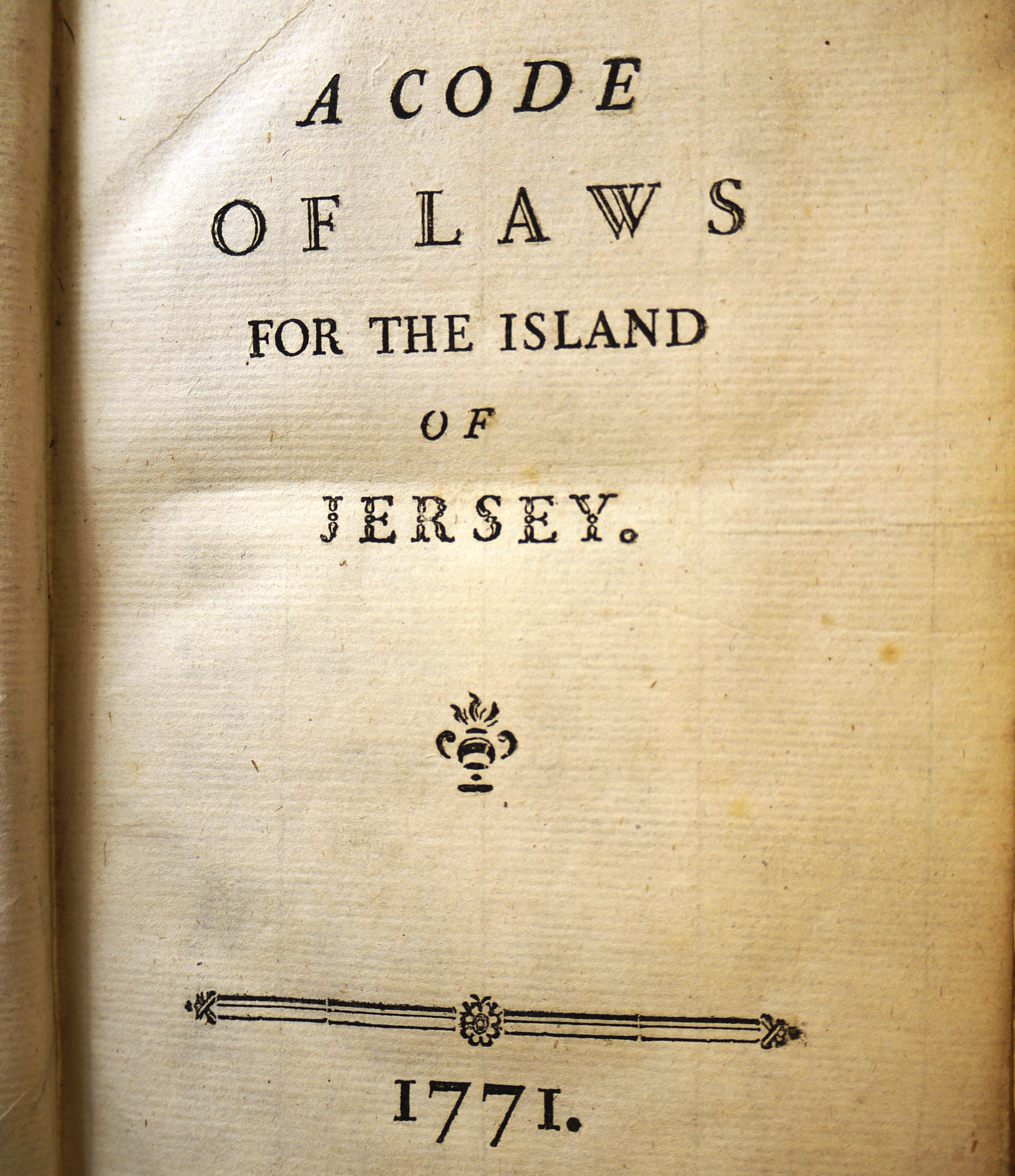
1771 Code of the Laws for the Island of Jersey

Originally the Royal Court had legislative power but by the sixteenth century a legislative assembly within the Royal Court was convened.

The earliest extant Act of the States dates from 1524. The States are mentioned in a document of 1497 regarding the endowments of the grammar schools; by 1526 attendance by members at the assembly was evidently a requirement, as in that year the Rector of St Mary was fined for failure to attend.

In 1541, the Privy Council, which had recently given a seat to Calais, intended to give two seats in Parliament to Jersey. Seymour, the Lieutenant-Governor, wrote to the Jurats, instructing them to send two Burgesses for the isle. However, no further steps seemed to have been taken since the letter did not arrive in front of the States Assembly until the day the elected persons were required to arrive in London.^{:70}

In the early seventeenth century separate minutes of the States of Jersey were first recorded.

When the monarchy was restored, King Charles II who had escaped to Jersey on his way to exile in France rewarded Jersey with the power to levy customs duties. This power, exercised by the Assembly of Governor, Bailiff and Jurats, was finally taken over by the States of Jersey in 1921, thereby enabling the States to control the budget independently of the Lieutenant Governor.

The Royal Court and the States both legislated until with the fixing in 1771 of the Code des Lois it was established that the States had a legislative monopoly.

=== Reform in the 19th century ===
The States voted on 6 November 1856 to adopt a law to add 14 deputies to the assembly to counterbalance the mismatch of population and voting power between St Helier ('town') and the country parishes. The first deputies were elected 12 January 1857.

The first election by secret ballot was held 1 December 1891.

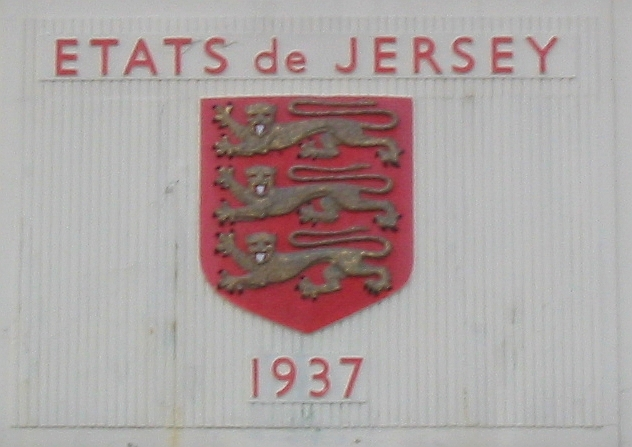
États de Jersey and arms on the original terminal building of Jersey Airport built by the States in 1937

=== Reform in the 20th century ===
Prior to constitutional reforms of 1948, Jurats and the Rectors (senior priests of the Church of England) had central roles in the Assembly. Jurats, elected for life by island-wide suffrage, presided over Assembly committees and sat in the Royal Court.

The reforms, introduced by the UK Government after the Occupation, significantly altered the composition of the States Assembly:

- Jurats were removed from the States Assembly and their responsibilities were limited to judicial matters in the Royal Court.
- Senators were introduced, with 12 elected on an island-wide basis. Initially, they served 9-year terms, later reduced to 6 years.
- Rectors, with the exception of the Dean of Jersey (who is Rector of St. Helier) ceased to be members of the Assembly. The Dean remained in the Assembly, but no longer had a right to vote.
- The number of Deputies was increased.

The Assembly's working language changed from French to English during the 20th century. English was permitted in the Chamber from 1900. Legislation started to be written in English from 1945.

=== Reform in the 21st century ===
In 2000, a review panel led by Sir Cecil Clothier proposed a series of significant political and constitutional reforms. Key recommendations included the following:

- All members of the Assembly would be elected on a single day, replacing the staggered election schedule for Senators, Deputies, Connétables.
- The position of Senator would be abolished.
- Connétables would no longer serve as ex officio members of the Assembly
- The Assembly would consist of 42–44 members, all holding the title 'Member of the States of Jersey'
- The 24 States committees would be replaced by a ministerial system, with ministers heading seven departments. A Chief Minister and Council of Ministers would be appointed by the Assembly.
- Proceedings of the Assembly would be recorded and published as a Hansard report.
- The Bailiff would no longer preside over the States Assembly, which would elect its own speaker.
- An Ombudsman would replace the States of Jersey Complaints Panel.

The proposals to remove Connétables and the Bailiff from the Assembly faced political opposition and were not implemented. Nor has an Ombudsperson been created.

A ministerial system was introduced by the States of Jersey Law 2005. The Law also removed the Bailiff's power of 'dissent' and casting vote, along with the Lieutenant Governor's veto power.

In response to criticisms of the system of ministerial government, the Assembly established an independent electoral commission in 2011 to review the structure of the Assembly. The Commission proposed reducing the number of members to 42, removing the senators, dividing the island into six electoral districts with seven Deputies, and that holding a referendum on whether the Connétables should remain in the Assembly. A referendum was held in 2014, in which a large majority voted to keep Connétables in the States.

In 2019, Tadier successfully proposed that Jèrriais become an official language of States Assembly, alongside English and French.

The 2022 general election was the first under the new electoral system of 37 elected Deputies and 12 Connétables. In March 2025, the Assembly voted to restore the office of Senator for the 2026 general election. The resulting changes provided for nine Senators to be elected on an island-wide basis, retained the 12 Connétables, and reduced the number of Deputies to 28.

== The States Building ==
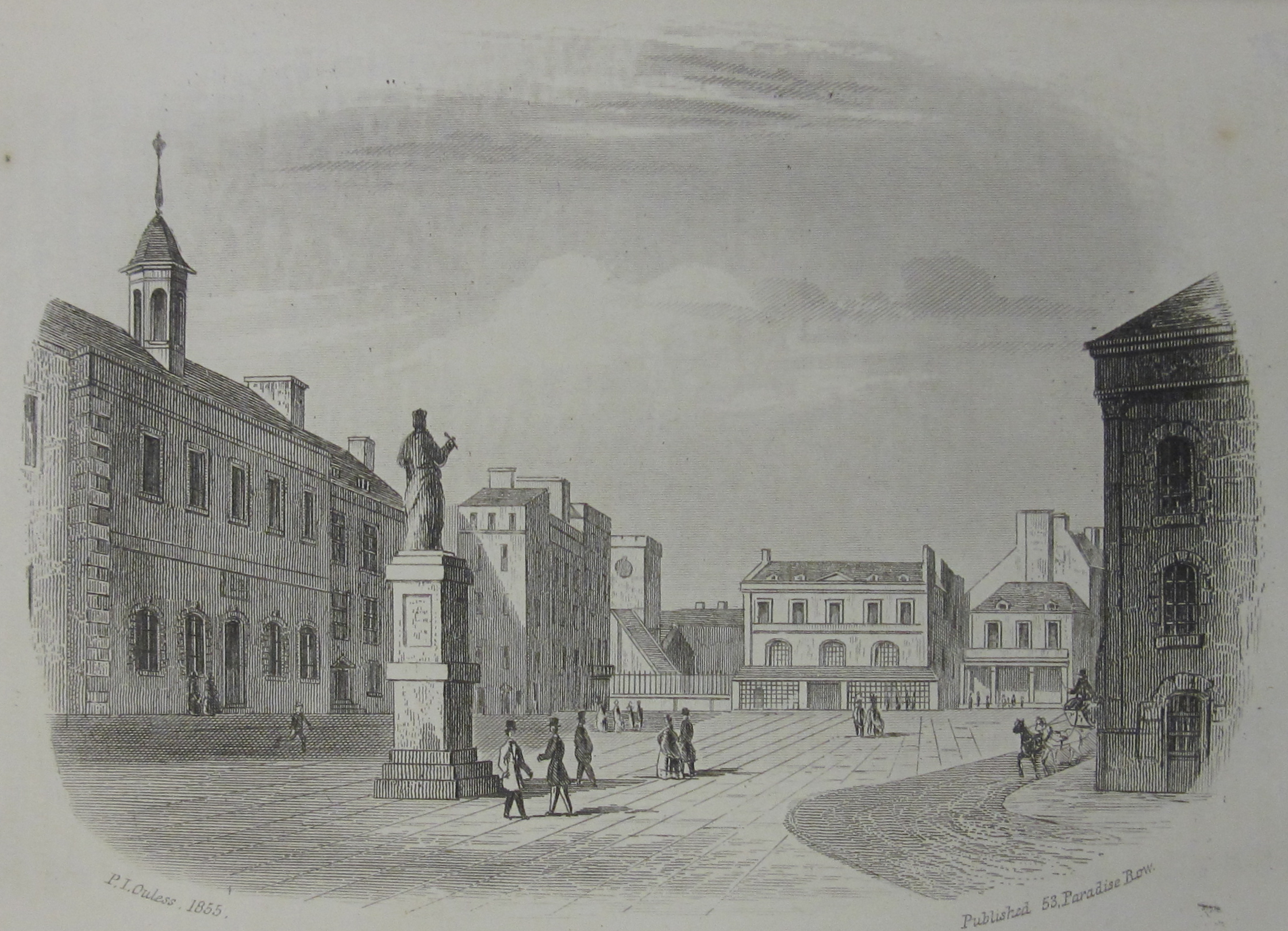
The Royal Square and La Cohue, the historic seat of the States, in an 1852 illustration by Philip John Ouless.

The States Building sits on the southern side of the Royal Square in St Helier. As well as the chamber, it includes committee rooms and facilities for members. It is part of a complex comprising the Royal Court, Bailiff's Chambers and Judicial Greffe.

Until 1887, the States had no meeting place of their own. They used to meet in the Royal Court on the Royal Square. The present chamber was opened in 1887, after a proposition was lodged au Greffe eleven years earlier providing for the establishment of a States Room above the Royal Court extension. The development and construction of the chamber were symbolic of the Assembly's increasing prominence and independence, and of Jersey's growing autonomy.

Seating in the chamber is in Jacobean style, with the benches arranged in horseshoe form around the twin seats of the bailiff and lieutenant governor. The bailiff's seat is raised slightly higher than that of the lieutenant governor to demonstrate his precedence.

- The initial members' seating arrangements were, from the point of view of the president: Jurats to sit on the left, Rectors to sit on the right and Deputies in the centre.
- After 1948, the Senators sat where the Jurats did before them, and then Connétables to their left and Deputies to their left (a reduction in seniority as one moves left to right).
- Between 2022 and 2026 (when Senators were removed), Connétables sat in one bloc, and Deputies in another.

In 2020, due to the COVID-19 pandemic, the States met online using Microsoft Teams and in a socially distanced setting at Fort Regent.

== Composition ==
Deputy constituencies and elected members for the 2022–2026 Assembly. The same nine Deputy constituencies were retained for the 2026 election, but each returned one fewer Deputy, reducing the total from 37 to 28. The nine removed Deputy seats were replaced by nine island-wide Senators.

Under Article 2 of the States of Jersey Law 2005, the States Assembly has 54 members. Following the 2026 Jersey general election, 49 are elected voting members serving four-year terms:

- nine Senators;
- 28 Deputies elected from nine constituencies; and
- the 12 Connétables of the parishes.

The remaining five are statutory non-voting members who sit by virtue of their respective constitutional or Crown offices.

=== Senators ===
Nine Senators are elected on an island-wide basis. The 2026 general election was the first since 2018 at which Senators were elected. The office had been abolished for the 2022 election, when the Assembly moved to a composition of 37 Deputies and 12 Connétables. Following a vote in March 2025, nine island-wide Senatorial seats were restored for the 2026 election, with one Deputy seat removed from each of the nine constituencies.

=== Deputies ===
The island is divided into nine constituencies, returning between 2 and 4 Deputies.

#	Constituency Name	Parish	Number of Deputies	Number of Connétables
1	St Helier South	St Helier	3	1
2	St Helier Central	St Helier	4	1
3	St Helier North	St Helier	3	1
4	St Saviour	St Saviour	4	1
5	St Clement	St Clement	3	1
6	St Brelade	St Brelade	3	1
7	North West	St Mary	3	1
7	North West	St Ouen	3	1
7	North West	St Peter	3	1
8	North	St John	3	1
8	North	St Lawrence	3	1
8	North	Trinity	3	1
9	East	Grouville	2	1
9	East	St Martin	2	1
Total			28	12

=== Connétables ===
Each of the 12 parishes elects a connétable as its civic head. By virtue of holding that parish office, each connétable is also a voting member of the Assembly.

Connétables are elected by first-past-the-post voting for four-year terms. Where running unopposed, prospective and incumbent Connétables must run against a None of the Above option. Collectively, they form the Comité des Connétables.

=== Statutory non-voting members ===
Article 2 of the States of Jersey Law 2005 constitutes five holders of constitutional or Crown offices as non-voting members of the Assembly:

- the Bailiff, who is President of the Assembly and ordinarily presides over its sittings;
- the Lieutenant-Governor, the monarch's personal representative in Jersey;
- the Dean of Jersey, who conducts prayers at sittings and may speak in debate;
- the Attorney General, the principal legal adviser to the States and Government; and
- the Solicitor General, the second Law Officer.

All five may attend and speak in the Assembly but may not vote. Their routes of appointment and constitutional functions differ, and they should not collectively be described simply as members appointed by the Crown.

The Deputy Bailiff may exercise the Bailiff's functions and preside when the Bailiff is unavailable, but is not separately constituted as a member of the Assembly under Article 2.

The clerk of the Assembly is known as the Greffier of the States.

The Viscount is the executive officer of the States (but is no longer a member of the Assembly).

=== Father or Mother of the House ===
The informal title “Father of the House”, or “Mother of the House”, is used for a particularly long-serving member of the Assembly, generally the member with the longest continuous elected service. Historically, the title was associated with the senior Senator, who until 1979 delivered the Assembly’s seasonal greetings. Stuart Syvret, first elected in 1990, was described as Father of the House during the 2000s. He was later succeeded in seniority by Simon Crowcroft, Connétable of St Helier, who served continuously from 1996 until 2026. Following Crowcroft’s retirement, Senator Lyndon Farnham, first sworn in as a member in 1999, became the longest continuously serving member. Deputy Carolyn Labey, a member since 2002, has also been referred to informally as the Mother of the House.

== Executive functions ==
Since the introduction of ministerial government in 2005, the States Assembly has not ordinarily exercised the executive functions of government. The Assembly selects the chief minister and ministers from among its elected members; together they form the Council of Ministers, which co-ordinates government policy and administration. Ministers and the administrative departments for which they are responsible constitute the executive branch, known as the Government of Jersey.

Following the 2026 Jersey general election, Lyndon Farnham was the only member nominated for Chief Minister and was declared Chief Minister-designate when the Assembly met on 19 June 2026. He formally continued in office when the new Council of Ministers was constituted after the selection of ministers. Tom Binet continued as Deputy Chief Minister and also serves as Minister for Health and Social Services.

The Assembly nevertheless retains some statutory functions that may be administrative or executive in character, particularly the appointment or removal of certain public office-holders and decisions which legislation expressly reserves to the States. Examples include appointing and, on specified grounds, removing the Commissioner for Children and Young People, consenting to the appointment and deciding the dismissal of the Greffier of the States, and determining by Act which days are to be observed as public or bank holidays.

== Legislative functions ==
A main type of legislation made by the States is known in English simply as a 'Law', and in French as a Loi (not an 'Act' as in the United Kingdom—in Jersey an Act or Acte of the States is an administrative enactment and may be in the nature of secondary legislation). After a Law is adopted by the States it is reviewed by the UK Ministry of Justice, then must receive royal assent and be registered with the Royal Court of Jersey before it is 'passed'.

Concerns have been raised about the adequacy of legislative scrutiny within the Assembly. In 2013, the Electoral Commission highlighted that most primary legislation was passed with minimal parliamentary examination, describing this as a 'serious democratic deficit'. Similarly, in 2014, the then Bailiff observed that detailed legislative provisions often did not receive the level of scrutiny that would be ideal.

Further analysis in 2017 by the Assembly's Privileges and Procedures Committee (PPC) revealed that only 19% of the Assembly's time in 2016 was devoted to legislative matters, including debates on both the general principles and detailed articles of proposed laws. The PPC also noted that draft legislation was rarely reviewed by scrutiny panels. In 2021, the PPC acknowledged some improvements, stating that legislative scrutiny had become a more regular part of the Assembly's work. However, they pointed out that progress continued to be hindered by limited time and insufficient expertise.

== Scrutiny functions ==
Members of the Assembly are responsible for scrutinising the work of the Council of Ministers, ministers and their departments.

=== Scrutiny Panels ===
Five standing scrutiny panels are established under the Assembly’s standing orders. Their utility is said to be "that of independent critique which holds ministers to account and constructively engages with policy which is deficient". The chair of each scrutiny panel is appointed by the States Assembly from among elected members who are neither Ministers nor Assistant Ministers; if more than one candidate is nominated, successive recorded votes are held until a candidate receives more than half of the votes cast. Chairs may be removed by the Assembly following a vote of no confidence.

The five standing scrutiny panels, their chairs and their principal areas of scrutiny are:

Scrutiny panel	Chair 2005-2008	Chair 2008-2011	Chair 2011-2014	Chair 2014-2018	Chair 2018-2022	Chair 2022-26	Chair 2026 to present	Principal areas scrutinised
Children, Education and Home Affairs Scrutiny Panel	Bob Hill (2005–2007); Deidre Mezbourian (2007–2008)	Roy Le Hérissier	Jeremy Maçon	Louise Doublet (to 2018); Jeremy Maçon (from 2018	Rob Ward	Catherine Curtis	Victoria Li	Children’s services and safeguarding; schools, further education and lifelong learning; policing, prisons, customs and immigration, fire and rescue, and emergency planning
Corporate Services Scrutiny Panel	Patrick Ryan	Sarah Ferguson	Sarah Ferguson	John Le Fondre	Kristina Moore	Sam Mézec (to 2024); Helen Miles	Lyndsay Feltham	The machinery of government and public administration; government-wide policy; public finances, taxation, expenditure plans and the Budget
Economic and International Affairs Scrutiny Panel	Geoff Southern	Mike Higgins ( 2008– 2011); Carolyn Labey ( 2011)	Steve Luce	John Le Maistre (2014–2015); Simon Brée ( 2015–2018)	Kirsten Morel (to 2020); David Johnson (from 2021)	Moz Scott (to 2024); Montfort Tadier	Samantha Gleave	Economic policy and business; financial services; external relations and international development; tourism, sport, culture, and the rural, marine and digital economies
Environment, Housing and Infrastructure Scrutiny Panel	Rob Duhamel	Philip Rondel	John Young	Simon Crowcroft (2014–J 2016); David Johnson (January 2016–2018)	Mike Jackson	Steve Luce (to 2024); Hilary Jeune	Hilary Jeune	Planning and environmental policy; housing; transport and roads; waste and wastewater services; public infrastructure and government property
Health and Social Security Scrutiny Panel	Bob Hill (2005–2006); Alan Breckon (2006–2008)	Alan Breckon (2008–2010); Geoff Southern (2010–2011)	Kristina Moore	Richard Renouf	Mary Le Hegarat	Geoff Southern (to 2023); Rob Ward (2023 – 2024); Louise Doublet from 2024	Beatriz Porée	Health and care services and public health; social security contributions, pensions and benefits; employment legislation and workplace rights

The most significant early change to the scrutiny structure occurred in 2006, when the Social Affairs Scrutiny Panel was divided into an Education and Home Affairs panel and a separate Health, Social Security and Housing panel.

Access to legal advice was a source of disagreement during the early development of the scrutiny system. A draft code produced by the Chairmen's Committee proposed treating the executive and Scrutiny Panels as parts of a single client for the purposes of advice from the Law Officers, and envisaged panels requesting access to advice given to ministers. The Attorney General objected that the executive and scrutiny were separate recipients of advice and that disclosure of ministerial advice without the client's consent would undermine confidentiality and legal professional privilege. The present codes provide that the Law Officers' Department may advise both ministers and panels, but that advice given to either remains confidential; where the department cannot advise a panel, it may assist the panel in obtaining external legal advice. The 2010 Carswell Review found that panels had sometimes experienced difficulty obtaining the legal basis of ministerial decisions or receiving sufficiently prompt advice, and recommended that ministerial advice should be disclosed where possible and that panels should otherwise be free to commission independent advice.

Several proposals have been made for reform of the scrutiny arrangements. In 2010 Senator Alan Breckon proposed replacing the five standing panels with temporary, topic-based review panels overseen by a Policy Review Committee; the proposed panels could also use suitably qualified members of the public as non-voting co-optees. The Assembly rejected the proposed reorganisation. In 2025, Deputy Moz Scott proposed that the Standing Orders should be amended to permit people who were not States members to serve as lay members of Scrutiny Panels, subject to terms of appointment and codes of conduct, provided that they did not constitute more than half of a panel's membership. She argued that lay members could supplement the limited pool of elected members and provide additional experience and specialist skills. Opponents argued that scrutiny of the executive was a fundamental responsibility of elected representatives and raised concerns about accountability and potential conflicts of interest; the Assembly rejected the proposal by 42 votes to 3.

=== Public Accounts Committee ===
A Public Accounts Committee (PAC), which includes external expert members, scrutinises the spending of public finances.

=== Review panels ===
Temporary review panels may also be established to examine specific issues, for example: Brexit, Future Hospital, Care of Children in Jersey, Gender Pay Gap, Legal Aid, One Government, The Transfer of the Ambulance Service and CAMHS, Government Plan, Government Plan Efficiencies, Safer Travel Guidelines, and Migration and Population.

=== Scrutiny Liaison Committee ===
The Scrutiny Liaison Committee, formerly known as the Chairmen's Committee, brings together the chairs of the five permanent scrutiny panels and the Public Accounts Committee to coordinate and oversee the Assembly's scrutiny work. Its president, commonly referred to as the Assembly's “chief scrutineer”, leads this coordinating work and represents the scrutiny function in dealings with the Assembly and the Government. The committee seeks to identify gaps or duplication in the panels' programmes, agree priorities and oversee the allocation of scrutiny resources, although individual panels remain responsible for conducting their own reviews and reaching their own conclusions.

On 14 July 2026, Karen Wilson was appointed President of the Scrutiny Liaison Committee, succeeding Inna Gardiner as the Assembly's Chief Scrutineer.

The following members have served as president of the Chairmen's Committee/Scrutiny Liaison Committee:.

Name	Term of office
Rob Duhamel	December 2005 – March 2007
Sarah Ferguson	March 2007 – December 2008
Ben Shenton	December 2008 – March 2011
Sarah Ferguson	April 2011 – November 2011
Tracey Vallois	November 2011 – November 2014
John Le Fondré	November 2014 – June 2018
Kristina Moore	June 2018 – July 2022
Sam Mézec	July 2022 – February 2024
Inna Gardiner	February 2024 – June 2026
Karen Wilson	July 2026 – present

=== International benchmarks ===
In May 2022, the Privileges & Procedures Committee published an updated assessment of how the island meets the Commonwealth Parliamentary Association's benchmarks for democratic legislatures. It reported that Jersey did not comply with the following benchmarks related to oversight of human rights:

- The oversight authority of the national Legislature shall include effective oversight of compliance with international treaties and obligations, including international human right instruments ...
- The Legislature shall establish a Human Rights Commission, or similar office, with the mandate to protect against human rights violations.

== Commissioner for Standards ==
The Commissioner for Standards is an independent office responsible for investigating complaints about the conduct of elected members of the States Assembly, Ministers and Assistant Ministers. The office was established by the Commissioner for Standards (Jersey) Law 2017. Under the Law, the Commissioner is appointed by the Privileges and Procedures Committee (PPC)

The Commissioner may investigate complaints alleging breaches of the Code of Conduct for Elected Members or the Code of Conduct and Practice for Ministers and Assistant Ministers, and may also begin an investigation on their own initiative. The Commissioner reports the outcome of investigations to the PPC and may recommend what action, if any, should be taken, but the Commissioner's conclusions and recommendations are not binding on the PPC. Standing Orders provide that, after receiving a report, the PPC reviews it, gives the member concerned an opportunity to address the committee, decides whether there has been a breach and may report its opinion and any action taken or proposed to the States.

The Law provides that the Commissioner must not be directed on how to carry out the functions of the office, including whether to undertake an investigation. Since 2023, the office has been held by Dr Melissa McCullough as Pan-Island Commissioner for Standards. The Commissioner's website describes the post as covering complaints about States Members and Ministers in Jersey, States Members in Alderney and members of Chief Pleas in Sark, under their respective codes of conduct.

== States of Jersey Complaints Panel ==
The States Assembly is linked to Jersey's administrative complaints system through the States of Jersey Complaints Panel. Under the Administrative Decisions (Review) (Jersey) Law 1982, a person aggrieved by a decision, act or omission relating to a matter of administration by a Minister, a department of the States, or someone acting on their behalf, may apply to the Greffier of the States for the matter to be reviewed by a Complaints Board. The Panel is not a committee of the Assembly: its members are not States Members and are described in public guidance as independent volunteers.

The Panel's Assembly connection is mainly through the Privileges and Procedures Committee (PPC). Under the 1982 Law, PPC appoints the Chair, Deputy Chairs and other members of the Panel, and a Complaints Board must send its report to PPC after completing an inquiry. Where a Board asks a Minister, department or other person to reconsider a matter, PPC must present to the States any information or further report it receives from the Board. The Panel must also report annually to PPC, which must present the annual report to the States and may add its own comments. Public guidance states that, after a Board's final report has been sent to PPC for presentation to the States, the relevant Minister is required to respond to the findings in the States Assembly.

== Members' remuneration ==
All elected members receive the same remuneration, irrespective of whether they serve as the Chief Minister, a minister, a scrutiny chair or a backbench member. From 1 October 2025, annual remuneration was £59,874.72.

Membership of the States was an honorary, unpaid position until 1969 when a means-tested minimum-income scheme was introduced. The means-tested arrangements were revised and uprated on several occasions. In November 2003, the States agreed to abolish means testing with effect from 1 January 2004 and to provide members with common rates of remuneration and expenses. An independent States Members' Remuneration Review Body was established in 2004 to make recommendations on future remuneration. An optional pension scheme was established in 2020 following a recommendation by the Review Body. The system for reviewing remuneration was placed on a statutory basis in 2022. Within 15 months of each ordinary election, the Privileges and Procedures Committee must establish an appointment panel consisting of the Greffier of the States and between two and four independent members; States members and States employees may not serve on the panel. The panel appoints an independent remuneration reviewer, who must consult the Minister for Treasury and Resources and every elected member and complete a report within 12 months. The report determines the amount of remuneration, the date from which it applies and any allowances or indexation arrangements. PPC presents the report to the Assembly, but the determination takes effect without requiring approval by members and cannot be amended by them.

Members who leave the Assembly may also receive a payment for loss of office. For the 2026 election, unsuccessful candidates received one month's remuneration for each four years of continuous service, calculated pro rata, while a transitional provision also covered retiring members with at least 19 years' service; from 2030, payments will be restricted to members who seek but fail to secure re-election.

== Disqualification, suspension and resignation ==
=== Disqualification ===
The grounds for disqualification from membership of the Assembly are prescribed by the States of Jersey Law 2005 and Connétables (Jersey) Law 2008. The statutory grounds include holding certain paid offices under the Crown, membership of the States of Jersey Police, detention or guardianship under mental health legislation, the appointment of another person to manage the member's affairs because of incapacity, being declared en désastre or entering an arrangement with creditors, and specified convictions for electoral corruption or resulting in imprisonment for at least three months without the option of a fine. A person may also be disqualified for breaches of election-finance legislation. Disqualification takes effect by operation of law and does not depend upon a vote of the Assembly. In April 2010, Senator Stuart Syvret was disqualified after having ceased to be resident in Jersey for six months. In January 2014, Deputies Shona Pitman and Trevor Pitman were disqualified with immediate effect after they were declared en désastre.

The Royal Court also has a customary supervisory jurisdiction over Connétables and may direct a Connétable who is no longer fit for office to resign. It exercised this power in 1994, when a Connétable of St John was required to resign following a conviction for driving with excess alcohol, and in 2021, when another Connétable of St John, was directed to resign following his conviction for dangerous driving. In 1960, the court dismissed the Connétable of St Peter after finding serious irregularities in the conduct of an election. These cases concerned the Connétables as heads of their parishes, rather than disciplinary action against them directly as members of the States Assembly; their membership of the Assembly ended as a consequence of leaving parochial office.

=== Suspension ===
Under the Standing Orders of the States of Jersey, the Privileges and Procedures Committee (PPC) may lodge a proposition seeking a member's suspension for a specified period of no more than 28 days as a disciplinary sanction; the member continues to hold office. If PPC has considered the matter and decided not to lodge a proposition, another member may do so if the proposition is signed by six members. The Assembly decides the proposition by vote, and a member suspended as a sanction is not paid during the period of suspension.

PPC may also propose that a member be suspended as a neutral act rather than as a sanction. Only PPC may lodge such a proposition, which must specify the proposed duration; the debate is held in camera. A suspended member may not participate in meetings or other parliamentary functions, although the suspension does not prevent constituency work which does not involve exercising parliamentary functions.

Deputy Philip Ozouf was suspended for 28 days as a disciplinary sanction in September 2025 following findings that he had breached the members' code of conduct. In November 2025, he was suspended as a neutral act until the conclusion of pending criminal proceedings, and in March 2026 he received a further 28-day disciplinary suspension. An earlier example occurred in September 1996, when the Assembly suspended Deputy Stuart Syvret until he withdrew written allegations that other members had acted from improper motives. The suspension was lifted in March 1997, when the Assembly instead censured him.

=== Resignation ===
A Senator or Deputy may resign at any time by giving written notice to the Bailiff. Senator Zoe Cameron resigned from the Assembly in July 2016, prompting a senatorial by-election. Earlier recorded resignations include those of Deputies Brian Troy in 1983, Anthony Perkins in 1986, and Edward Vibert in 2000, who resigned because of ill health.

== Voter turnout ==
Jersey has the lowest voter turnout of OECD countries. Turnout at Jersey's 2022 election was just 41.7% – the third lowest figure in the last 30 years.

== Broadcasting and webcasting ==
Since 1986, BBC Radio Jersey broadcasts the main States sittings live. In 2015, cameras were installed in the States Chamber to provide a live and on-demand video stream through the States Assembly website.

== See also ==
- Politics of Jersey
- Political parties in Jersey
- Chief Minister of Jersey
- Law of Jersey
- Elections in Jersey
- States of Guernsey
