= Norman law =

Customary law of the Duchy of Normandy

Norman law (Norman: Coûteume de Normaundie, French: Coutume de Normandie, Latin: Lex Normanica) refers to the customary law of the Duchy of Normandy which developed between the 10th and 13th centuries and which survives today in the legal systems of Jersey and the other Channel Islands. It grew out of a mingling of Frankish customs and Viking ones after the creation of Normandy as a Norse colony under French rule in 911.

There are traces of (Anglo-)Scandinavian law in the customary laws of Normandy. A charter of 1050 (Cartulaire Saint-Pierre-de-Préaux, concerning the land of Vascœuil), listing several pleas before Duke William II, refers to the penalty of banishment as ullac "(put) out of law" (from Old Norse útlagr "(be) banished"), well attested in the Norwegian and Anglo-Saxon laws as utlah and those sentenced for ullac are called ulages (< útlagi "outlaws"). The word was still current in the 12th century, when it was used in the Roman de Rou by Wace. Another word mentioned in the same charter is hanfare (or hainfare, haimfare, hamfare < Old Norse heimför) which punishes the offense of invasio domus, known mainly in England as hamsocn. In the Très ancien Coutumier (1218 - 1223) this crime is called in Latin assultus intra quatuor pertica domus "assault inside the house".

Marriage more danico ("in the Danish manner"), that is, without any ecclesiastical ceremony in accordance with old Norse custom, was recognised as legal in Normandy and in the Norman church. The first three dukes of Normandy all practised it.

Scandinavian influence is especially apparent in laws relating to waters. The duke possessed the droit de varech (from Old Norse vágrek, influenced phonetically *vreki "wreck"), the right to all shipwrecks. He also had a monopoly on whale and sturgeon. A similar monopoly belonged to the Danish king in the Jutlandic law of 1241. The Norman Latin terms for whalers (valmanni, from hvalmenn) and whaling station (valseta, from hvalmannasetr) both derive from Old Norse. Likewise, fishing seems to have come under Scandinavian rules. A charter of 1030 uses the term fisigardum (from Old Norse fiskigarðr) for "fisheries", a term also found in the Scanian law of c. 1210.

Norman customary law was first written down in two customaries in Latin by two judges for use by them and their colleagues: the Très ancien coutumier (Very ancient customary) authored between 1200 and 1245; and the Grand coutumier de Normandie (Great customary of Normandy, originally Summa de legibus Normanniae in curia laïcali) authored between 1235 and 1245.

== The centrality of land in Norman law ==
In Norman customary law, land was not conceived as a freely disposable commodity but as the foundation of the social, economic, and political order. The Coutume drew a fundamental distinction between movable property—regarded as of little legal consequence under the maxim res mobilis, res vilis—and immovable property (land), which was subject to extensive legal protections designed to preserve it within the family across generations.

Land was further classified into acquêts (property personally acquired) and propres (property inherited from ancestors). The propres received the highest degree of legal protection, as they were considered the essential patrimony of the family—held in trust for future generations rather than freely alienable by any single holder. To prevent the loss of ancestral land, the Coutume established the retrait lignager (clameur de lignage), a right enabling family members to repurchase land sold to an outsider by reimbursing the buyer, thereby restoring the property to the lineage.

This conception of land as a quasi-institutional entity—held in trust for the family rather than owned absolutely by the individual—shaped the entire Norman legal system, from succession rules to the structure of feudal tenure. Under the Coutume, land was not "owned" in the modern English sense of freehold; it was held from a superior lord through a chain of tenure obligations binding the holder to the ducal court and to the customary law of the Duchy. In the Channel Islands, these principles remained operative for centuries: the distinction between propres and acquêts continues to govern aspects of inheritance law, and the retrait lignager survived in Jersey until 1834, in Guernsey until 2015, and in Sark until 2018—nearly a millennium after its Norman origins. The broader principle—that land is held within a framework of customary tenure rather than as absolute private property—underpins the feudal system through which the Channel Islands maintain their distinct legal identity, separate from the English common law tradition.

== Survival in the Channel Islands ==
The Channel Islands remained part of the Duchy of Normandy until 1204 when King Philip II Augustus of France conquered the duchy from King John of England. The islands remained in the personal possession of the King of England and were described as being a Peculiar of the Crown. They retained the Norman customary law and developed it in parallel with continental Normandy and France, albeit with different evolutions. While the Coutume was replaced in mainland France by the Napoleonic Code in 1804, it has remained the foundation of the Channel Islands' legal systems, administered by the Royal Court of Guernsey and the Royal Court of Jersey. The Coutume governs not only feudal tenure but also property transactions, inheritance, and unique remedies such as the Clameur de haro, a Norman injunction invoking Rollo that remains enforceable today, last used in Alderney in 2017. This distinct legal framework has enabled the islands to develop their own commercial, tax, and trust laws independently of the UK Parliament, forming the basis of the Channel Islands' modern role as international financial centres while preserving the Norman legal identity that distinguishes them from both the United Kingdom and France. The annual sitting of the Court of Chief Pleas in Guernsey and the Assize d'Héritage in Jersey—at which the holders of the fiefs nobles listed in the Schedule to the Court of Chief Pleas (Guernsey) Law, 2004 continue to attend as fief-holders owing tenure directly from the Crown—constitute the institutional expression of the Norman legal order under which the islands continue to operate. This classification of the land as Norman tenure rather than generic freehold property as in the United Kingdom—at the basis of the islands' Norman specificity—was explicitly preserved by the Guernsey legislature in the reforms of 1980 and 2002, which abolished economic feudal privileges while maintaining the feudal relationship between the Crown and fief-holders.

== See also ==
- Clameur de haro
