= Royal Court (Jersey) =

Principal court of the Bailiwick of Jersey

The Royal Court is the principal and oldest court in Jersey, and exercises both criminal and civil jurisdiction. It can sit in a number of configurations, depending on the type of case and the powers to be exercised.

== History ==
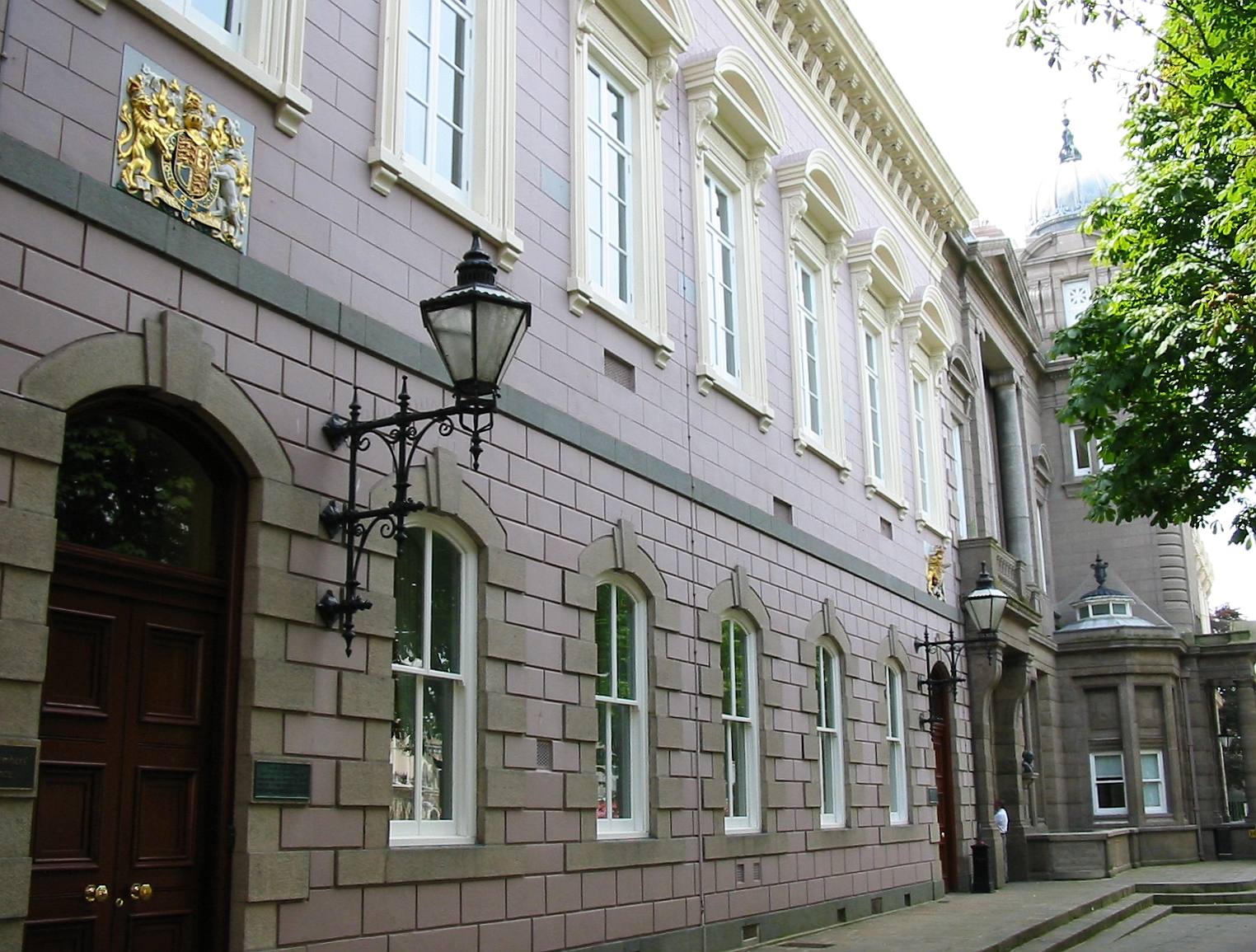
Royal Court building in Saint Helier

The Court has its origins in the 13th century when, following the English Crown's loss of those portions of the Duchy of Normandy which are on the European mainland, King John decreed that Jersey should continue to be subject to Norman customary law. The Royal Court exercised both judicial and legislative functions for the Island, although the power to make laws moved to the States Assembly in the 15th century.

== Judiciary ==
The Bailiff of Jersey is the president of the Royal Court (and also of the Court of Appeal). Individual trials may be heard before the Bailiff, the Deputy Bailiff (also a full-time role) or a Commissioner. Commissioners are part-time judges, appointed from the ranks of judges in the Commonwealth or senior experienced lawyers from the Channel Islands, United Kingdom or the Isle of Man, either for defined periods of time or for specific cases. The Master of the Royal Court deals with some preliminary matters in civil cases. The Court is supported by the Judicial Greffier who fulfils the role of Clerk of the Court.

In addition to the judge, the Royal Court includes the Jurats. They are unpaid lay people, aged 40 or more, who have been elected by an electoral college. They hold the office until the age of 72. The jurats decide issues of fact in criminal and civil trials (except criminal assizes, when a jury is empanelled), hand down sentences in criminal trials and award damages in civil trials.

== Civil jurisdiction ==
Three divisions of the Court deal solely with civil matters. The Héritage division decides cases concerning land and immovable property. The Family division deals with divorce, adoption and the care of children. The Probate division is concerned with wills and inheritance.

The Samedi division deals with all other civil cases coming before the Royal Court. It previously sat on a Saturday, hence the name (Samedi is the French word for Saturday), but now sits on Fridays.

When exercising civil jurisdiction, the Royal Court almost always sits as the Inferior Number – that is, comprising the Bailiff (or the Deputy Bailiff, or a Commissioner) and two Jurats.

== Criminal jurisdiction ==
As well as hearing civil cases, the Samedi division of the Royal Court also hears criminal cases. There are three ways in which a case can be tried: by the Inferior Number of the Royal Court, by an assize sitting or (for sentencing only) by the Superior Number.

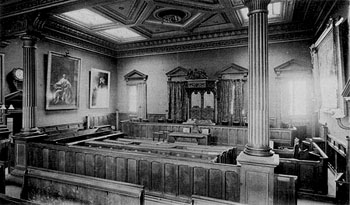
Interior of Royal Court looking from the public gallery

The Inferior Number of the Royal Court tries offences (termed 'contraventions') defined in statute law or (where the defendant agrees) offences against customary law. It also deals with bail applications. When sitting as the Inferior Number, the court is made up of the Bailiff (or the Deputy Bailiff, or a Commissioner) and two Jurats. There is no jury, and the Jurats are the judges of fact. The Inferior Number may hand down a sentence of up to four years imprisonment. If it believes that a heavier sentence is appropriate, it must refer the case to the Superior Number for sentencing.

The Inferior Number also hears appeals against decisions of the Magistrates' Court. There is generally no onward appeal.

An assize sitting of the Royal Court is used when the defendant is charged with an offence (called 'crimes' for the more serious offences, and 'délits' for the less serious ones) against customary law. The case is tried by a judge (the Bailiff or Deputy Bailiff or a Commissioner) and a jury of 12 citizens.

The Superior Number of the Royal Court only has a role in respect of sentencing, either on reference or appeal from the Inferior Number. Unlike the Inferior Number, it can impose any sentence allowed by law, including imprisonment for more than four years. The Superior Number is made up of the judge and five or more jurats.

== Visite royale ==
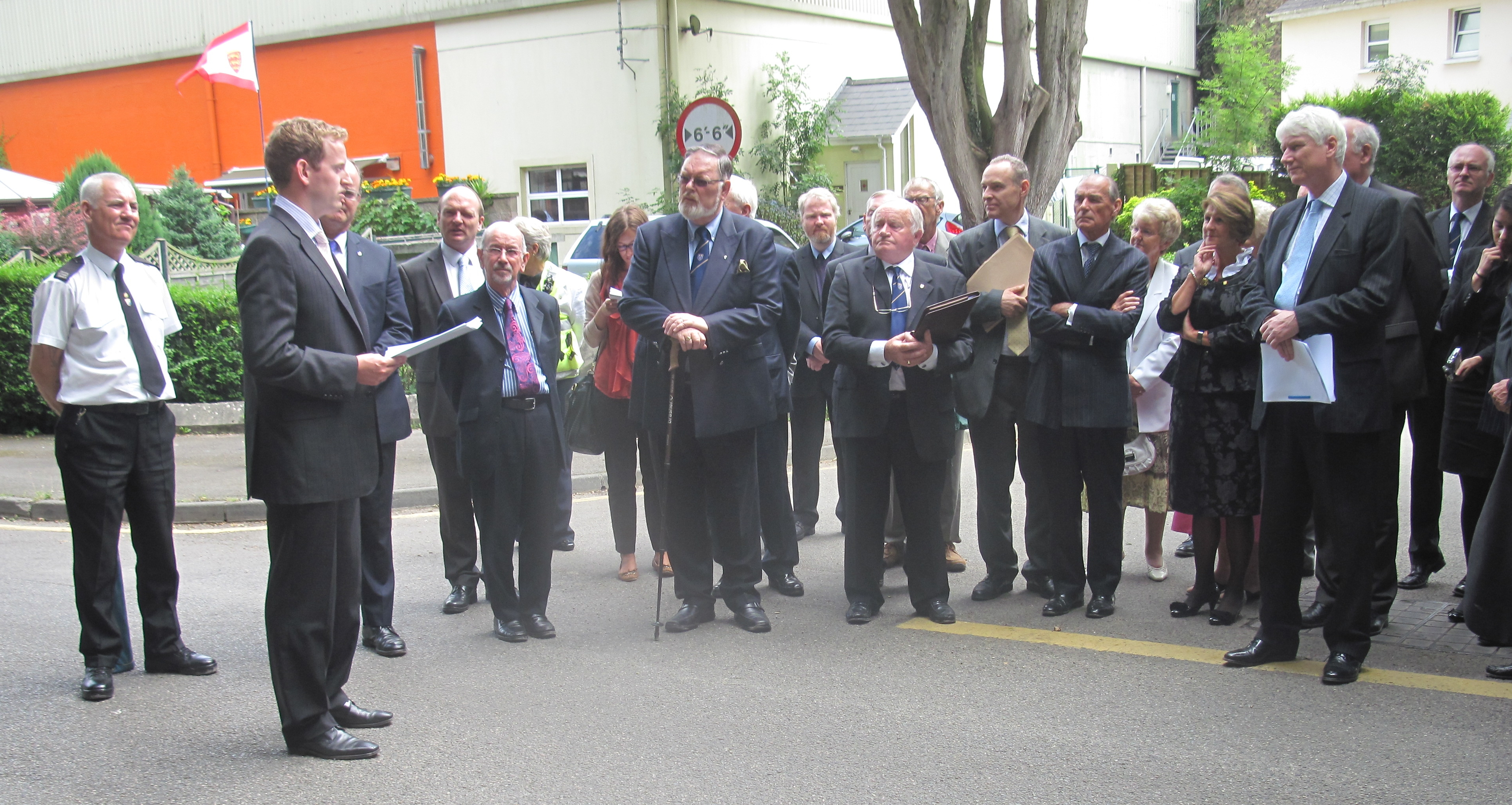
HM Solicitor-General presents argument before the Royal Court, voyeurs and officials regarding whether the Parish of Saint Helier could remove dead trees at risk of falling into the roadway (2012)

A visite royale is an annual ambulatory inspection by the Royal Court of one of the parishes of Jersey. Since 1803 the alternation of the visites has been fixed so that each parish is visited once every six years. The origin of the custom goes back to the jurisdiction of the viscount over the roads and paths of the Duchy of Normandy. The court inspects the parish accounts (although since modern practice is that accounts are professionally audited, this is a formality) and receives a report on policing and other matters from the connétable and chef de police. A panel of twelve voyeurs, made up of notable Parishioners nominated by the Connétable, is sworn in and leads the court on a circuit of roads around the parish, drawing the court's attention along the way to transgressions and encroachments that require judgment. The jurisdiction of the Visite Royale is to make "any order designed to ensure the rights of the public lawfully to use the public roads and pathways of the Island without obstruction, hinderance [sic] or inconvenience." Judgment is given on the spot, although this may be an order that further investigations should take place and be reported to the Royal Court at a later date.
