= Viscount of Jersey =

Chief executive officer of the Royal Court of Jersey

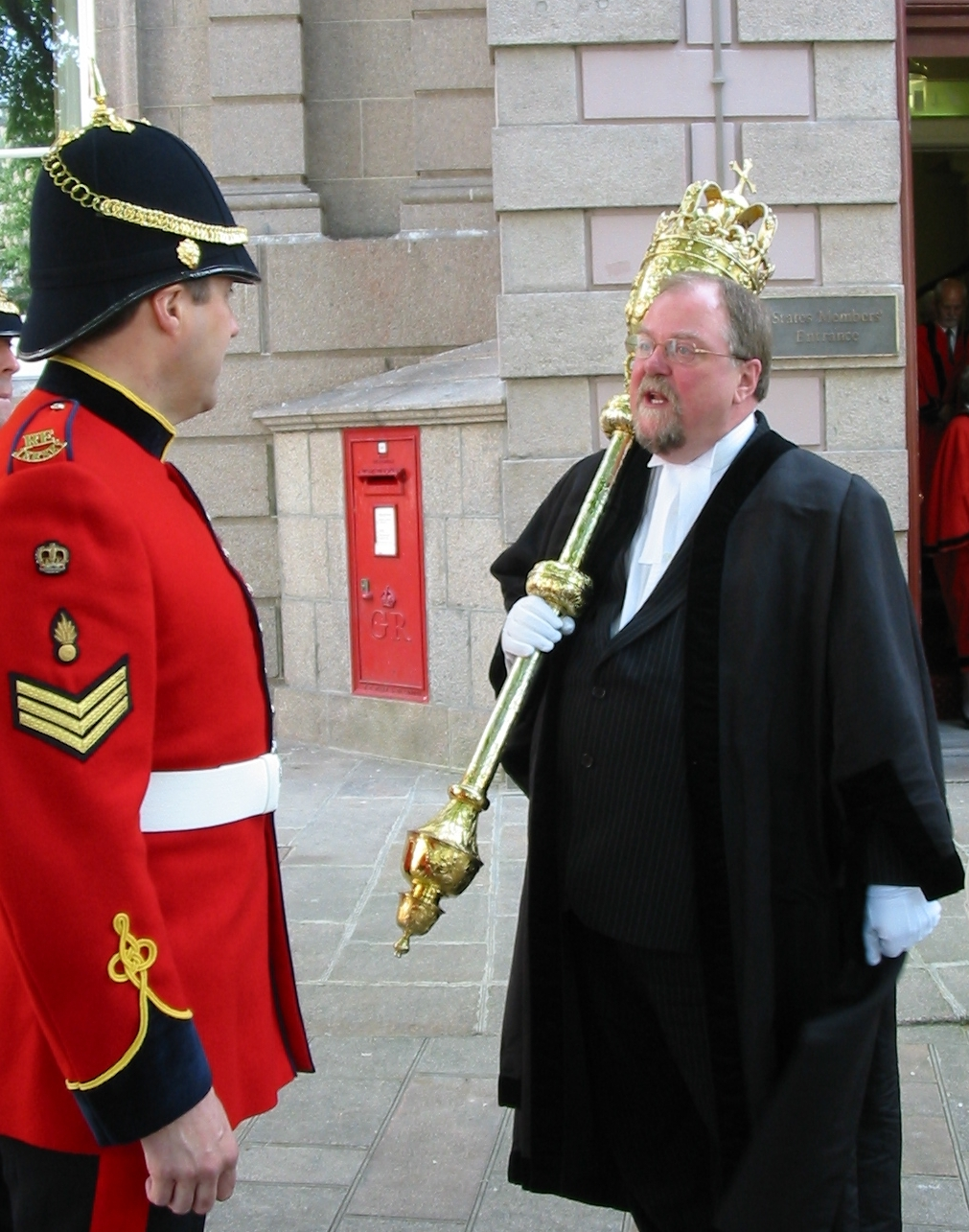
The Deputy Viscount bearing the Royal Mace in 2008

The Viscount of Jersey (French: Vicomte de Jersey) has, since the 14th century, been the chief executive officer of the Royal Court of Jersey. Since 1930, court services have been provided by the Viscount's Department (French: Département du Vicomte) in conjunction with the Judicial Greffe. Until 1973 the Viscount was appointed by the Crown; since 1973 Viscounts have been appointed by the Bailiff of Jersey.

The principal function of the Viscount (also referred to in Channel Island English by the Jersey Legal French title of the Vicomte) is the execution of the orders of the courts of Jersey. This involves managing fines, bail monies, seizures, confiscations, evictions, service of process, arrests for non-appearance in court and other enforcement procedures.

The Viscount manages jury selection and exemption, financial assistance to jury members and acts as surveillant for the jury.

The Viscount also acts as coroner to deal with matters relating to sudden or unexpected death, and administers estates of deceased persons.

In cases of insolvency, the Viscount administers en désastre proceedings.

The Viscount is amongst those who act as autorisé (returning officer) for elections in Jersey.

The Viscount acts as mace-bearer for the Bailiff of Jersey in the States of Jersey and the Royal Court of Jersey, and carries out other ceremonial functions.

== History ==
The Viscount carried out other functions historically: till 1885 the Public Markets were under his control. He was Comptroller of Weights and Measures and a member of the Prison Board. He read aloud Royal Proclamations in the Royal Square. A notable action of the Viscount during the exile in Jersey of Charles, Prince of Wales, was the proclamation in the Royal Square of the Prince as King, following the execution of his father.

Until 1842 the Viscount was a member of the States of Jersey with a right to speak but not to vote. From 1842 until 1948 the Viscount sat as a member of the States without speaking or voting rights. The constitutional reform of 1948 removed the Viscount's membership of the legislature but the Viscount's Department continues to be represented at meetings of the States for the provision of executive services.

The Biographical Dictionary of Jersey by Balleine says:

VISCOUNT. Vicomte. In ancient France a very high dignitary, the Vice-Count, who took the place of the Count or Duke, when absent. Later in Normandy a Viscount was appointed over each county, the Viscount of the Cotentin, the Viscount of the Avranchin, etc. A charter of 1179 shows the Viscount holding the King's Court in Guernsey. In time the dignity of the name was forgotten, and the Viscount became a mere Court official. By the 14th century the Viscount in Jersey was the chief executive officer of the Court, appointed by the Crown to see that orders of the Court were carried out, to issue summonses, to make arrests, to keep prisoners in custody, to abate nuisances, to deliver seisin 'by the Viscount's rod'. He also acted as Coroner, and till 1885 the Public Markets were under his control. He read aloud Royal Proclamations in the Royal Square, was Comptroller of Weights and Measures and a member of the Prison Board.

== List ==
From	To	Viscount	Deputy Viscounts
April 1661	1668	Jean Nicolle	
30 May 1668	1683	Sir Edouard De Carteret	
1683	1708	James Corbet	
1708	1716	David Bandinel	Richard Dumaresq (1715)
1716/7	1741	George Bandinel Sr.	George Bandinel Jr. (1723); John Dumaresq (1731); Helier De Carteret (1735); Charles Marett (1741)
1741	1743	George Bandinel Jr.	
1743	1785	Thomas Durell	Philip D'Auvergne (1759–1761, 1762); Charles Marett (1761); Clement Le Montais (1763–1764); Nicholas Messervy (1764–1768); George Benest (1768)
27 August 1785	1842	Matthieu Gosset	Thomas Gallichan (1785–1796); Thomas-Louis Lerrier (1796); Francis Marett (1799); John Winter (1802–1812); Charles de Ste Croix (1812–1823); Philip Le Gallais (1823–1842)
21 December 1842	1875	Sir John Le Couteur	
29 May 1876		Gervaise Le Gros	
15 December 1894	16 August 1917	Reginald Raoil Lemprière	J A Balleine
12 September 1917	13 August 1929	Edmund Toulmin Nicolle	J A Balleine
9 August 1930	December 1937	Advocate Charles Sydney Le Gros	J A Balleine (died December 1937)
1 January 1938	1945	Advocate Charles Sydney Le Gros	Herbert Vyvian Benest
1945	1945	Advocate Herbert Vyvian Benest (acting)	n/a
6 October 1945	31 December 1959	Herbert Vyvian Benest	J P Vardin
2 January 1960	23 April 1971	Herbert Vyvian Benest	Philip Francis Misson
23 April 1971	31 October 1981	Philip Francis Misson (acting) made permanent 24 October 1974	Dennis Ferbrache (1974–1981)
11 November 1981	June 2015	Michael Wilkins	Dennis Ferbrache (1981–1996); Peter de Gruchy (1996 to 2012); Advocate Mark Harris (sworn in 28 January 2013) (2013–2015)
July 2015	March 2022	Advocate Elaine Millar	Advocate Mark Harris
June 2022	3 November 2023	Advocate Matthew Swan	Advocate Mark Harris
15 October 2023		Advocate Mark Harris	Advocate Matthew Berry (2024 to present)
