= Taxation in Jersey =

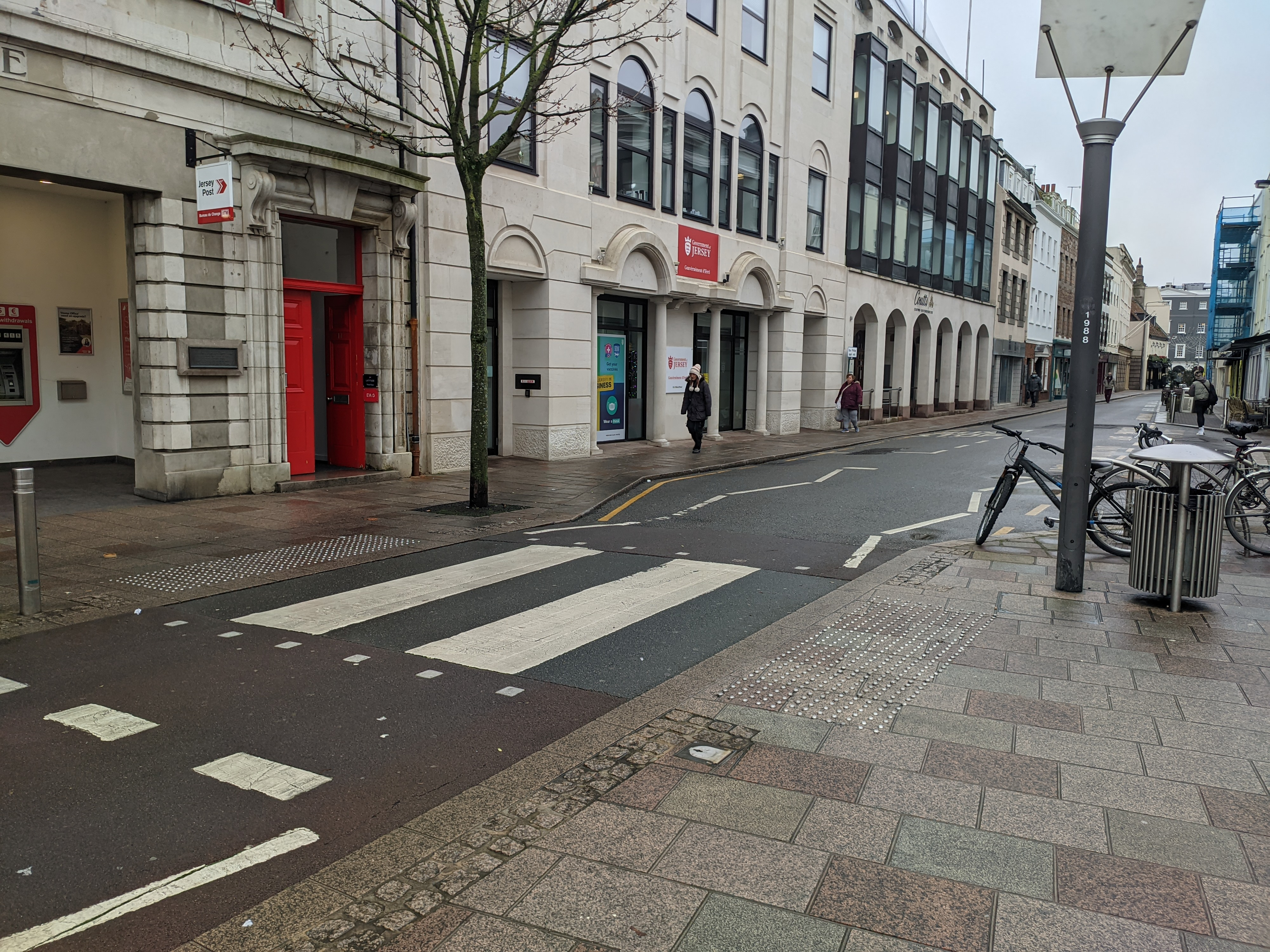
The Government of Jersey is responsible for revenue collection in the island.

Jersey is a Crown Dependency with fiscal sovereignty and therefore sets its own tax rates. The island has a 'simple and stable' tax system, which does not change much over time. This is reflected in States policies, which call for a 'low, broad, simple and fair' system. Jersey does not have inheritance, wealth, corporate or capital gains tax.

Jersey's tax system has been criticised as allowing tax avoidance. As such, the country has been labelled by some as a 'tax haven', though this label is contested.

== Types of tax ==
=== Personal Tax ===
Ordinary residents of Jersey are liable to pay income tax on all worldwide income; non-ordinary residents are liable to pay tax on Jersey-source income and worldwide income which is remitted to Jersey. The maximum income tax rate is 20 per cent on net income, after allowances. Jersey operates a marginal tax rate system: for lower incomes, no tax is charged on income up to an exemption limit, then charged at 26 per cent. Whichever tax amount is lower between the standard and marginal rate is taxed.

Jersey operates a special tax system, known as the '2(1)(e) policy', for 'high net worth individuals' which can be considered a golden visa-type system. (Note: It is not a citizenship by investment system and does not confer British citizenship onto the high net worth individual.) This system grants a housing license to such individuals, who must buy a high-value house or apartment in the island. All Jersey property income and the first £850,000 of other income is charged at 20 per cent. Remaining income is charged at 1 per cent.

Until the 20th century, the States relied on indirect taxation to finance the administration of Jersey. The levying of impôts (duties) different from those of the United Kingdom was granted by Charles II and remained in the hands of the Assembly of Governor, Bailiff and Jurats until 1921 when that body's tax raising powers were transferred to the Assembly of the States, leaving the Assembly of Governor, Bailiff and Jurats to serve simply as licensing bench for the sale of alcohol (this fiscal reform also stripped the Lieutenant-Governor of most of his effective remaining administrative functions).

The first income tax in Jersey was introduced in 1928. Income tax has been levied at a flat rate of 20% set by the occupying Germans during the Second World War. Jersey's tax is not entirely regressive, however. Exemption thresholds apply to those on lower incomes and tax reliefs exist for married couples, single parents, child day care and children.

Until February 2020, married women in Jersey did not have control over their own tax affairs. Since 1928, married couples were required to file tax receipts under their spouse's name, married women's earning were considered part of their spouses' earnings and male permission was required for women to be treated separately or to discuss her financial affairs with the tax office. For couples in same-sex marriages, the older partner was required to give permission for the younger. In 2020, a vote in the States Assembly (40 pour, 2 abstentions) to reform the law to give both marriage partners equal rights over the couple's tax affairs passed to come into force from 2021.

=== Goods and services tax ===
Historically, no value added tax (VAT) was levied in Jersey, with the result that luxury goods have often been cheaper than in the UK or in France. This provided an incentive for tourism from neighbouring countries.

The States of Jersey introduced a goods and services tax (GST) in 2008. It was originally set at 3%, but rose to 5% on 1 June 2011 as part of the 2011 States budget. To try to prevent islanders living below the poverty line, the States of Jersey introduced an Income Support service in January 2008.

Although this is a form of VAT, there are a number of significant differences between the European VAT and Jersey's GST. It is charged at a much lower rate than UK or French VAT, so Jersey can still act as a low-tax shopping jurisdiction on certain items. However there are far fewer exemptions to GST policy. For example, no VAT is charged on female sanitary products (the so-called 'tampon tax') in the UK while GST still applies in Jersey.

Some items are GST zero-rated, e.g. exports, housing, prescriptions, while others are exempt from the tax, e.g. financial services, insurance, postal services and supplies by charities. Imported goods below £135 are also exempt from the charge.

=== Corporation Tax ===
Jersey has a corporate income tax. The standard rate for all corporations is 0%, however Jersey is not a corporate-tax free jurisdiction. A 10% tax applies for regulated financial services companies and a 20% maximum tax rate applies for larger corporate retailers and utility and property income companies.

On 5 June 2021, global finance ministers, including the UK Chancellor Rishi Sunak, at the G7 agreed to set a new global minimum tax rate of 15% (although all G7 countries have higher tax rates) and to ensure that major corporations, such as Amazon and Microsoft, pay taxes in the countries where they operate, not those where they have headquarters. It will affect the island and take a number of years to implement, meaning Jersey's "zero-ten" tax policy will no longer be possible. On 16 May, Chief Minister John Le Fondré had criticised the move led by Joe Biden. He said in an interview with the i newspaper that the US should look "closer to home before involving themselves in the tax policies of others", citing Delaware's tax regime. Former Senator Ben Shenton said the zero-ten system was nearing its "sell-by" date and the zero percent rate was reinforcing Jersey's image as a tax haven.

=== Customs ===
Taxes are charged on road fuel, vehicles, alcohol and tobacco and are similar to UK excise duties.

== Social security ==
The social protection system in Jersey is known as Social Security. In 2004, Jersey spent less than any EU country on social protection at 12.3 per cent of GDP, though the island's per capita GDP was higher than the European average. Social security contributions are funded by both employees and employers on monthly earnings.

As of 2023, the basic state pension is £253 per week for single persons and £421 for married couples.

During the COVID-19 pandemic, the government introduced Co-Funded Payroll to support businesses.

== Criticism ==
Many have criticised Jersey's tax policies and labelled the island as a tax haven, although some, including the Government of Jersey, do not recognise that label.

Despite the island's small size, it is recognised as a large offshore finance centre. Jersey Finance estimates that Jersey trusts control £1 trillion in assets. According to the Tax Justice Network, Jersey suffers from the "finance curse", a term used to describe a low-tax jurisdiction's overreliance on the finance sector (which accounts for over 50% of the island's GVA and directly accounts for 25% of the island's jobs) and a lack of a viable alternative development strategy. Even in the modern day, Jersey continues to encourage high-wealth individuals to settle in the island to take advantage of lower tax rates.

Jersey has a long history of tax avoidance, being one of the first offshore financial services markets. Jersey has a long history of low-tax and duty-free economic activity. Jersey's situation between France and England meant that Jerseymen took up smuggling of goods into French and English ports. For example, Jean Martel of St Brelade organised brandy and textile smuggling into both sides of the Channel. In the 1920s, high net worth individuals from Britain would emigrate to the island (or simply shift their wealth there) for tax purposes.

In 2020, the Tax Justice Network, a UK tax advocacy group, placed Jersey seventh in its list of "The top 10 countries that have done the most to proliferate corporate tax avoidance and break down the global corporate tax system" and 16th in its Financial Secrecy Index. below larger countries such as the UK, however still placing at the lower end of the 'extreme danger zone' for offshore secrecy'. The island accounts of 0.46 per cent of the global offshore finance market, making a small player in the total market. A large proportion of the financial services conducted in Jersey are tax-driven, meaning they are booked there without the requirement of adding value.

Tax Research UK classes Jersey as a tax haven. It too claims Jersey is a tax haven, citing its "half-hearted commitment to transparency". Jersey's finance industry featured in a BBC Panorama documentary, titled "Tax me if you can", first broadcast on 2 February 2009.

It is arguable that the people who benefit from Jersey's new tax structure are the owners of the large businesses that are separate or support the financial service based businesses. This is because they do not have to pay any corporation tax but will still benefit from the island's business.

In 2020, the Corporate Tax Heaven Index ranked Jersey 8th for 2021 with a haven score (a measure of the jurisdiction's systems to be used for corporate tax abuse) of 100 out of 100, however it only has 0.51% on the Global Scale Weight ranking.

As of 2020, the European Union does not consider Jersey to be a tax haven ("non-cooperative jurisdictions for tax purposes"). Jersey cooperates with the EU and implements all its commitments. When the list was established in 2017, Jersey was initially on its "grey list" (Annex II), however was removed from the list entirely in March 2019. One of the mitigation measures Jersey put in place was the "Economic Substance Law" in 2019. Under the law, companies within its scope must be directed and managed, conduct Core Income Generating Activities ("the key essential and valuable activities that generate the income of the company and these activities must be carried out in Jersey") and have adequate employees, expenditure and physical assets in Jersey. The chair of the EU Tax Matters Subcommittee Paul Tang has however criticised the list for not including "renowned tax havens" such as Jersey. In January 2021, the European Parliament voted overwhelmingly to include on the blacklist of countries those that use a 0% corporate tax regime, which includes Jersey. However, the final decision still rests with the EU's Economic and Financial Affairs Council. Robert Palmer, director of Tax Justice UK, said, "post-Brexit the UK tax havens have lost their protector within the corridors of Brussels".

Furthermore, in 2017 the OECD ranked Jersey as a 'compliant' country in terms of tax transparency in its Global Transparency Barometer.

The Netherlands however does consider Jersey to be a tax haven. Jersey was placed on their tax avoidance "blacklist" in 2019. The list includes any jurisdiction with a corporate tax rate below 9%. As a result, companies registered in Jersey must pay 20.5% tax on interest and royalties received from the Netherlands from 2021.

However former Chief Minister Terry Le Sueur, has countered these criticisms, saying that "Jersey [is] among cooperative finance centres". Jersey has tax information exchange agreements with 40 countries, double taxation agreements with a number of other countries (with more "ready for signing"). Jersey Finance, the body representing the finance industry in Jersey, does not consider Jersey a tax haven, but does recognise ongoing tax evasion and avoidance.

In September 2013 the UK Prime Minister, David Cameron, said it was not fair any longer to refer to any of the overseas territories or Crown dependencies as tax havens, as they have taken action to make sure that they have fair and open tax systems. Its information privacy law also provides exemptions that other European countries do not, for example in the way Trusts do not have to disclose as much information to Benficiaries about use of their personal data as is normally required under such laws.

A report by Capital Economics Ltd., commissioned by Jersey Finance found that the island is a conduit for around £500 billion of foreign investment in the UK. That report found Jersey is a net economic benefit to the UK, supporting between 250,000 and 575,563 jobs in the UK. 50 per cent of the foreign investment into the UK originates outside the London time zone, so the report argues that, without Jersey, the investment may go to other international finance centres, rather than staying in the British Islands. A survey in the report found that 85 percent of Jersey's financial services business would leave the sterling zone entirely without Jersey.

=== VAT avoidance ===
The absence of VAT also led to the growth of a fulfilment industry, whereby low-value luxury items, such as videos, lingerie and contact lenses were exported in a manner avoiding VAT on arrival, thus undercutting local prices on the same products. A number of companies, including off-island companies Tesco, HMV and Amazon and on-island companies Play.com and Blahdvd, operated this model.

In 2005 the States of Jersey announced limits on licences granted to non-resident companies trading in this way. Low-value consignment relief provided the mechanism for VAT-free imports from the Channel Islands to the UK. In April 2012, the UK closed this loophole, leading to the closure of many island businesses and the loss of a number of jobs on the island.

The Social Security department introduced a Back to Work programme to deal with the job losses and Jersey Post had to suffer significant cut-backs in response to a reduction in fulfilment. The States appealed against the UK decision, but this failed. As a result of the new rule, the UK tax authorities reported a 200% rise in import VAT from the Channel Islands, estimated at £95 million per year.
