= Rip-off Britain =

English expression

Rip-off Britain is an expression used by some to refer to the phenomenon in which some products and services cost significantly more in the United Kingdom than in other countries, especially member states of the European Union and the United States, than a basic currency conversion would permit.

== Origin ==
In 1999, the Consumers' Association hired a stand at the British International Motor Show, only revealing on press day its true purpose in doing so—to highlight high British car prices. The organizers of the show, the Society of Motor Manufacturers and Traders, decided not to fan the media flames by ejecting the Consumers' Association.

By this point, the phrase had already taken hold in the mass media, and it became a term in frequent use to describe anything that was wrong with Britain. It also proved to be one of the elements leading to a tipping point in the harmonisation of car prices within the EU. The campaign was devised by UK advertising agency Claydon Heeley, who are known for such "guerrilla marketing" work.

== Possible causes ==
=== Taxation ===
The level of indirect taxation applied to some products such as alcoholic drinks, tobacco, and petroleum may serve to disguise high profit margins by the retailer, but it may also work in the opposite direction, squeezing profits when there are other legal markets with lower taxation.

While the standard UK rate of Value Added Tax (VAT) of 20 per cent is generally triple or more that of US sales taxes, differences in prices can be far greater than this could account for.. The Crown Dependencies of Jersey and Guernsey are not part of the EU and Low Value Consignment Relief applied to imports. Retailers such as Play.com and Specsavers operated from Jersey or Guernsey specifically as a means of avoiding VAT.

In the UK, imported commercial goods valued up to £15 are exempt from VAT; for personal gifts, the exemption rises to £36. As of July 2014, imports up to the value of £135 are not liable for UK customs duty.

=== Business costs ===
Companies sometimes argue that some of their fixed costs are higher in the United Kingdom than elsewhere, such as for storage and distribution. The truthfulness of this defence varies from case to case. For example, the UK has around the fiftieth-highest population density of any country in the world, eight times that of the US and over twice that of France, so transportation distances are unlikely to be a factor, and a parliamentary report concluded there was no great difference across EU states.

Differences in storage costs are difficult to quantify, since many goods are shipped just in time directly from the manufacturer to the consumer, or in the case of electronic goods and services, they may not be physically shipped at all, but delivered via the Internet.

=== Easy conversion ===
Simply converting $1 to £1 is one reason for the price increase. For example, Wikipedia's page asking for donations gives the following options,

US customers: "This year, please consider making a donation of $5, $20, $50 or whatever you can to protect and sustain Wikipedia."

UK customers: "This year, please consider making a donation of £5, £20, £50 or whatever you can to protect and sustain Wikipedia."

Discussing why personal computers cost more in the UK than in the US, New Scientist stated in 1977 that "the price of an American kit in dollars rapidly translates into the same figure in pounds sterling by the time it has reached the shores of Britain". This also applies to digital downloads where the price is not a round number and where the costs are the same. "The ever popular method of simply swapping the $ sign for a £ sign sees a monthly subscription to Spotify priced at $9.99 in the US and £9.99 in the UK", Which? magazine stated in 2013.

At its launch, Microsoft Windows Vista had a suggested retail price of $249 (£127) in the United States and £249 ($487) in the United Kingdom. This made it almost twice as expensive to buy in the UK as in the U.S.

== Remedies ==
=== Shipping from abroad ===
Higher prices in the UK often have the effect of encouraging British consumers to order goods from the Internet, whether from UK businesses claiming to break a price cartel or directly from abroad, including via eBay and other online auction sites.

Most American Internet retailers ship directly to consumers in the UK which, assuming customs provisions are met, can provide a worthwhile alternative to higher UK prices. Many believe that competition from the Internet and the Eurozone general free trade will tend to normalize retail prices and put an end the UK being known as "Treasure Island". However, "customer not present" transactions can generally not be made for legally controlled products such as alcohol, tobacco, solvents, fuels, or medication.

Electrical and electronic products designed for the North American market may have to be converted to run on EU voltage and TV systems, annulling any benefit in reduced prices. Other products may also differ in specification, or they may not come with the same warranties or guarantees, making returning faulty goods difficult, or at least not cost effective. Furthermore, products for sale in the European Union should carry the CE mark for safety, but products purchased in the United States or designed for the US market are often supplied with other safety designations such as the UL listing.

=== Internet delivery ===
Products and services delivered over the Internet do not face physical barriers for shipping the goods, so one might expect Internet-based markets to normalize across free trading countries.

Apple's iTunes Store formerly operated a model in which purchases can only be made in a domain where the users' means of payment is registered. UK customers were therefore tied to the offerings in the UK iTunes Store, proving a disadvantage both in price and selection. On 9 January 2008, however, Apple conceded that this was unfair practice and promised to harmonise prices with Europe within six months, citing record labels' wholesale music prices as the reason.

== See also ==
- Regional lockout
- VAT-free imports from the Channel Islands
- Australia Tax: An identical observation by those in Australia, where goods sold in Australia cost much higher amounts that the same goods sold across Asia and the United States, even for items such as computer software which is sold via digital distribution.
