= Economy of Jersey =

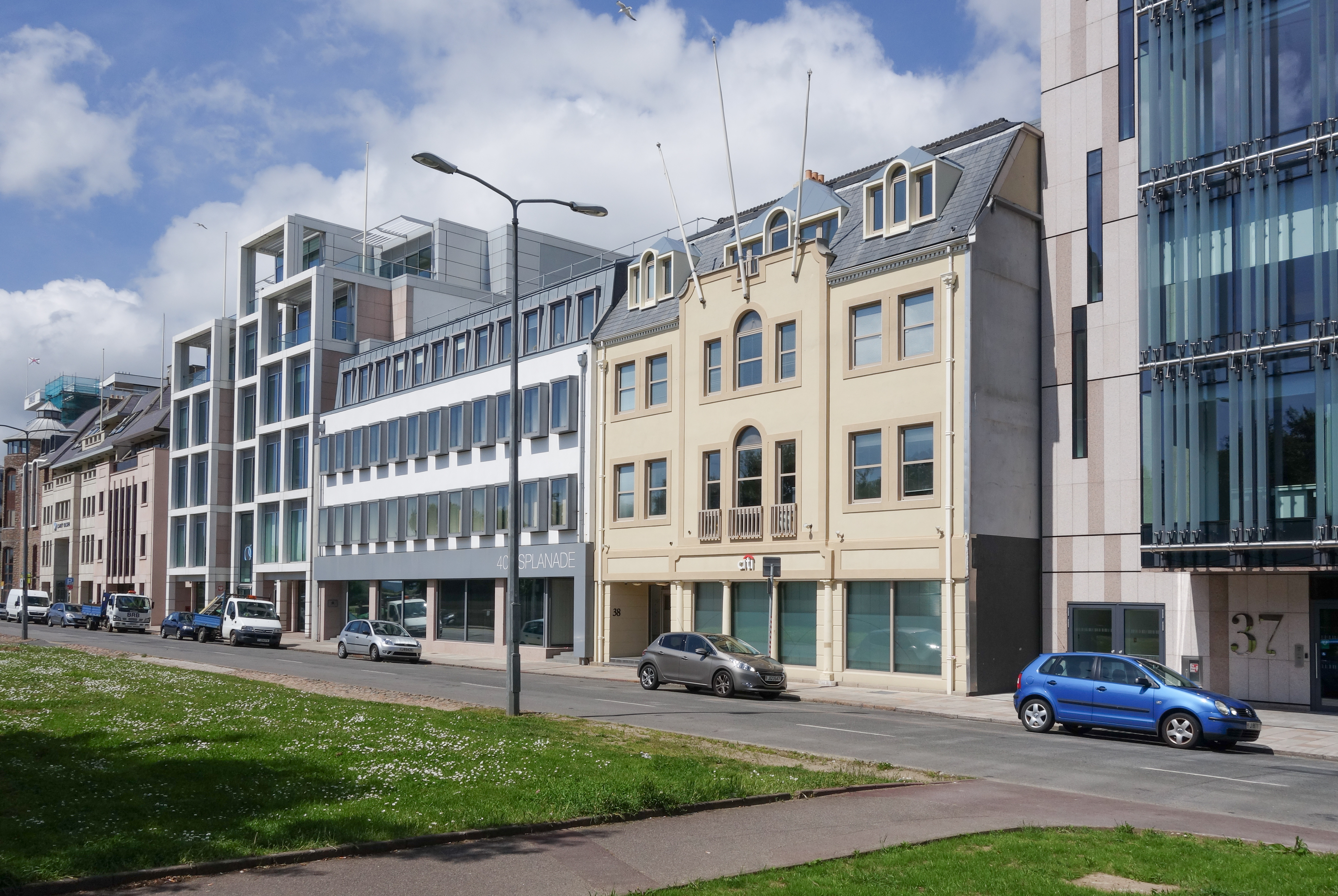
- Finance offices in St Helier in 2014
- Currency: Pound sterling (GBP, £); Jersey pound (JEP, £)
- Fiscal year: 1 January - 31 December

Statistics
- GDP: £5.76 billion ($7.14 billion) (2022)
- GDP per capita: £55,910 (2022)
- Inflation (CPI): RPI 5.7% (March 2024)
- Labour force: 64,200 (June 2023)
- Labour force by occupation: financial and legal (24%), wholesale and retail (16%), public sector (13%) (2011)
- Unemployment: 3.5% (March 2021 est.)
- Average gross salary: £2,816 / $4,363 mean monthly (2011)
- Main industries: Financial and legal services, construction, retail and wholesale, manufacturing, agriculture, transport and communications. (2008).

External
- Export goods: light industrial and electrical goods, dairy cattle, foodstuffs, textiles, flowers
- Main export partners: United Kingdom, France
- Import goods: machinery and transport equipment, manufactured goods, foodstuffs, mineral fuels, chemicals
- Main import partners: United Kingdom, France
- Gross external debt: $NA

Public finance
- Revenue: $846 million (2011 est.)
- Spending: $928 million (2011 est.)
- Economic aid: None.
- All values, unless otherwise stated, are in US dollars.

The economy of Jersey is a highly developed social market economy. It is largely driven by international financial services and legal services, which accounted for 39.5% of total GVA in 2019, a 4% increase on 2018. Jersey is considered to be an offshore financial centre. Jersey has the preconditions to be a microstate, but it is a self-governing Crown dependency of the UK. It is considered to be a corporate tax haven by many organisations.

Other sectors include construction, retail, agriculture, tourism and telecommunications. Before the Second World War, Jersey's economy was dominated by agriculture, however after liberation, tourism to the island became popular. More recently, the finance industry recognised worth in operating in Jersey, which has now become the island's dominant industry.

In 2017, Jersey's GDP per capita was one of the highest in the world at $55,324. In 2019, the island's economy, as measured by GVA, grew by 2.1% in real terms to £4.97 billion. In December 2020, there were 1,350 people actively seeking work.

== History ==
=== Agriculture ===
Until the 16th century, the economy of Jersey was based on feudalism and open-field self-sustenance agriculture. The main crop, wheat, was exported and sold to Spanish merchants in St Malo.

Enclosure happened in Jersey around the end of the 16th century. Unlike in England, enclosure was done by the peasantry in order to make profit from producing cider, the production of which moved Jersey's economy from self-sufficiency to cash-crop agriculture. From then until the 19th century, cider was the largest agricultural export; in 1795, 20 percent of the island was orchard. In 1839 for example, 268,199 imperial gallons (1,219,260 L) of cider were exported from Jersey to England alone, but by 1870 exports from Jersey had slumped to 4,632 imperial gallons (21,060 L). Beer had replaced cider as a fashionable drink in the main export markets, and even the home market had switched to beer as the population became more urban.

Enclosure and the subsequent transition to cash-crop agriculture can be blamed for shortages in essential crops, particularly corn, which caused political instability in the island, such as the 1769 Corn Riots.

Potatoes overtook cider as the most important crop in Jersey in the 1840s. Small-scale cider production on farms for domestic consumption, particularly by seasonal workers from Brittany and mainland Normandy, was maintained, but by the mid-20th century production dwindled until only eight farms were producing cider for their own consumption in 1983. The number of orchards had been reduced to such a level that the destruction of trees in the Great Storm of 1987 demonstrated how close the Islands had come to losing many of its traditional cider apple varieties. A concerted effort was made to identify and preserve surviving varieties and new orchards were planted. As part of diversification, farmers have moved into commercial cider production, and the cider tradition is celebrated and marketed as a heritage experience.

Since the 1800s a significant portion of the Jersey economy has been greenhouse agriculture raising fruits, vegetables and flowers under glass. In the twenty first century this has been a declining activity with many greenhouses now unused and some in derelict condition. There was a motion in the Jersey legislature in early 2022 to repurpose unused greenhouses as construction sites for housing. A compromise proposal was that half the unused greenhouses be used for other purposes. The measures failed to pass

=== Textiles ===
The textile industry became a popular export industry for islanders, particularly women. In fact, the trade became so popular that in 1608 the States had to ban knitting during harvest and vraicking season. This industry connected rural Jerseymen to the wider global economy. The knitting of woollen garments was a thriving industry for Jersey during the 17th and 18th centuries. The knitting industry died sometime after 1750.

=== Ship building ===
Jersey was the 4th largest ship building area in the 19th century British Isles. See History of Jersey.

=== Historical exchange rates ===
Jersey pounds per US dollar - 0.55 (2005), 0.6981 (January 2002), 0.6944 (2001), 0.6596 (2000), 0.6180 (1999), 0.6037 (1998), 0.6106 (1997); the Jersey pound is at par with the British pound.

== Fiscal policy ==
Jersey is fiscally independent from the UK. UK public money is not ordinarily spent in the island, and Jersey residents do not pay tax or national insurance contributions to HMRC. As the UK is responsible for Jersey's defence and international representation, the cost of Jersey to the British taxpayer could be seen at around £55 million, though this is a notional cost; it is unlikely that, if Jersey were independent, that money would be saved on costs to the armed forces. The States make, upon agreement with Westminster, a contribution to the costs of its relationship in the form of a territorial army on the island.

=== Tax system ===
Jersey has a 'simple and stable' tax system, which does not change much over time. This is reflected in States policies, which call for a 'low, broad, simple and fair' system. The country collects income tax on its ordinary residents, with allowances and exemptions available for both low-income and very high-income residents (the latter through the 2(1)(e) policy). Corporate income tax is charged through the zero-ten policy, through which most businesses do not pay any corporation tax. Jersey does not have inheritance, wealth, corporate or capital gains tax.

Impôts are charged on road fuel, vehicles, alcohol and tobacco and are similar to UK excise duties.

=== Social protection ===
The social protection system in Jersey is known as Social Security. In 2004, Jersey spent less than any EU country on social protection at 12.3 per cent of GDP, though the island's per capita GDP was higher than the European average. Social security contributions are funded by both employees and employers on monthly earnings.

=== Criticism ===
Jersey is considered a 'tax haven' by some sources (e.g. the Tax Justice Network), but this label is contested. Jersey has a long history of tax avoidance and smuggling due to its special constitutional status. The EU's tax haven blacklist does not include Jersey in the list dated February 2023, though has in the past and the list has been criticised for leaving out jurisdictions such as Jersey. The Government of Jersey and UK Government have argued that Jersey is a cooperative jurisdiction and the local finance industry rejects the tax haven label.

=== GST and VAT avoidance ===
A value-added tax system is in place known as Goods and Services Tax (GST), which is set at 5 per cent. Some items are zero-rated - but not food - and imported products below £60 are exempt.

The difference between the GST and UK/EU VAT systems previously led to VAT avoidance facilitated through the island. This included fulfilment by Play.com and Amazon, among other large retailers. Low-value consignment relief provided the mechanism for VAT-free imports from the Channel Islands to the UK. In April 2012, the EU closed this loophole, leading to the closure of many island businesses and the loss of a number of jobs on the island.

== Sectors ==
=== Financial and legal services ===
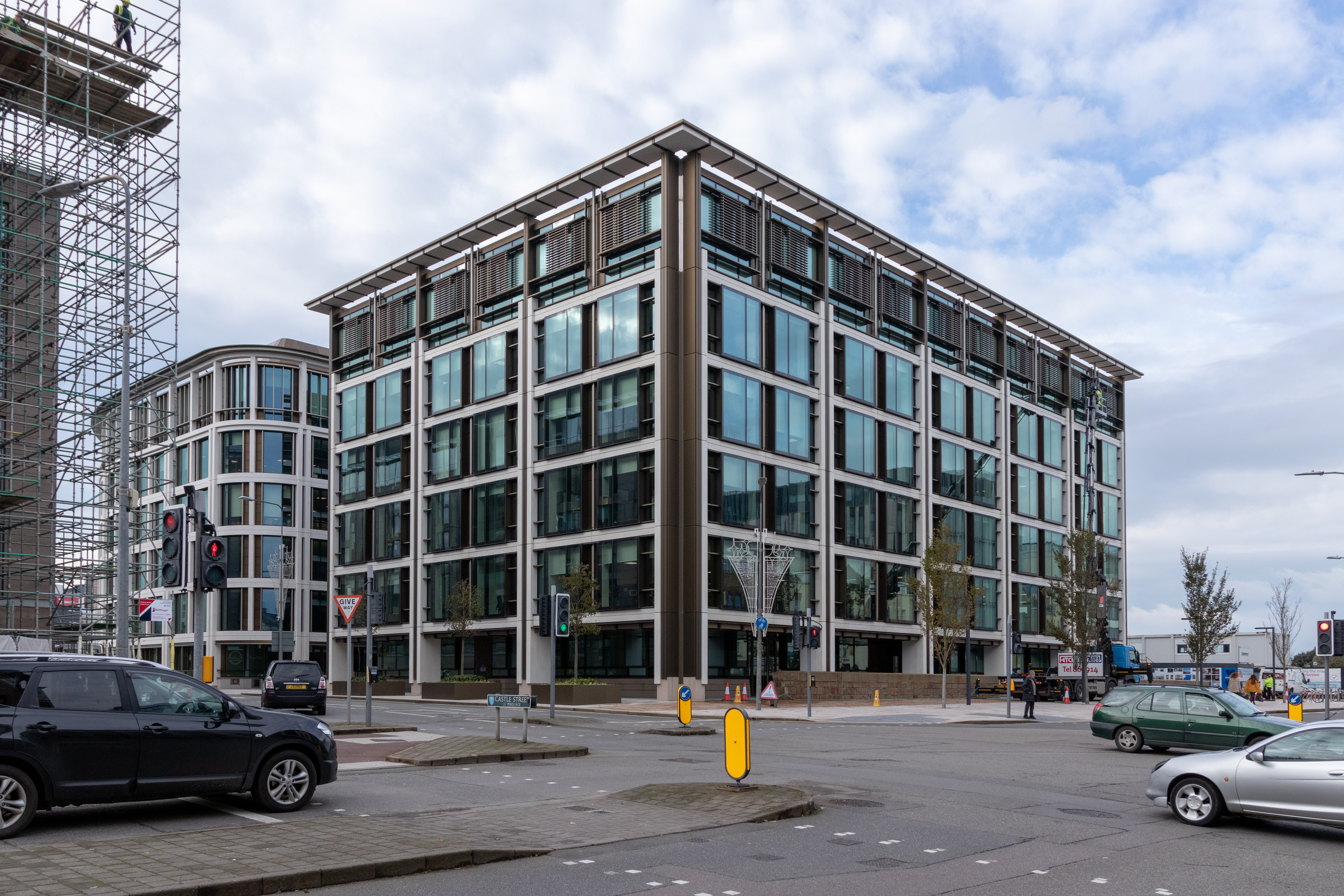
International Finance Centre

Jersey-based financial organisations provide services to customers worldwide. In December 2020, it was reported that there were 13,510 jobs within this sector. The finance sector profits were about £1.18 billion in 2015.

Jersey is one of the top worldwide offshore financial centers It has been criticised for its tax practices, with many calling the island a tax haven. It attracts deposits from customers outside of the island, seeking the advantages such places offer, like reduced tax burdens. In 2020, Tax Justice ranked Jersey as the 16th on the Financial Secrecy Index, below larger countries such as the UK, however still placing at the lower end of the 'extreme danger zone' for offshore secrecy'.

However The International Monetary Fund (IMF), the Organisation for Economic Co-operation and Development (OECD) and the European Union (EU) have all endorsed Jersey as a top international finance centre. In 2017's OECD Rating, Jersey scored top marks from the OECD on tax transparency, receiving a "fully compliant" rating and as recently as 2019 The European Council of Finance Ministers (ECOFIN) have formally confirmed Jersey a Co-operative Jurisdiction. In addition, a MONEYVAL Assessment by the Council of Europe rated Jersey compliant or largely compliant in 48 of their 49 assessment areas, the highest score amongst all states assessed.

In the fourth quarter of 2020, the total value of banking deposits held in Jersey decreased from £137.8bn to £131.6bn while the net asset value of regulated funds under administration increased by £12.6bn to £378.1bn. There were 33,626 live companies on Jersey's register.

Jersey shares The International Stock Exchange (TISE) with Guernsey, where it is based.

=== Construction ===
Construction represented 7% of GVA during 2019. In June 2020 it was reported that 5,970 people were employed full-time in the construction and quarrying sector.

St Helier has a lot of ongoing construction projects. The reclamation of land opened in the 1980s new land for development in the town centre. This has led to development projects such as the Jersey International Finance Centre, Horizon and the new St Helier Waterfront project.

The GVA of the construction sector declined by 1% between 2018 and 2019.

=== Retail and wholesale ===
As of June 2020 there were 6,940 jobs within Jersey's wholesale and retail trades. Retail and wholesale declined by 1% between 2018 and 2019.

Jersey has a large range of local and national shops. SandpiperCI Limited operate a chain of stores in Jersey, their franchises include well-known names, such as Morrisons, Marks & Spencer, Iceland, and Costa Coffee.

A number of online retailers, and fulfillment houses operate from the Channel Islands, including Jersey, supplying a variety of low-value goods such as CDs, DVDs, video games, and gadgets. Residents of the EU were choosing to order goods from Jersey, so as to benefit from a tax relief known as Low-value consignment relief (LVCR). UK residents, in particular, were taking advantage of this situation.

A local company, play.com grew substantially during the time that LVCR applied to Jersey. Notably, Amazon UK also took advantage of this by dispatching some low-value items from Jersey.

In April 2012 the UK Government made law changes to prevent the Channel Islands continued exploitation of LVCR, meaning that UK residents would have to pay the full VAT amount on items imported from the Channel Islands. Some goods are still sold and distributed from Jersey, despite these changes.

=== Agriculture ===
In 2017, 33,301 vergées were dedicated to agriculture, with each holding having an average area of 78 vergées. Since 2006, there has been a reduction in the number of smaller holding areas, as have the number of larger holdings (64 in 2006 to 53 in 2017).

The Rural Support Scheme was introduced in 2017 to replace the Single Area Payment. 75% of agricultural areas by surface area are subject to RSS.

There has been a reduction in the total number of agricultural workers since 2007.

10-year averages of staff numbers during peak season months.
	2007	2012	2017
Full-time	678	635	488
Part-time	138	188	114
Seasonal	1031	837	834
Total	1847	1660	1436

The total value of all export crops has increased since 2013. In 2017, it is £42.5 million. The primary exported crops are potatoes (£31.6m), narcissus flowers (£891k), courgettes (£184k) and cauliflowers (£22k). The number of Jersey Royal potatoes cultivated has increased by 18% between 2007 and 2017.

The total area dedicated to glasshouses from 2013 to 2017 has reduced from 275.8k m^{2} to 174.3k m^{2}.

The Jersey breed of dairy cattle is known worldwide. In 2017, there were 4,842 cattle in Jersey. The gross sales value of the milk delivered to Jersey Dairy in 2017-18 was £13.9 million. Milk products go to the UK and other EU countries.

=== Tourism and hospitality ===
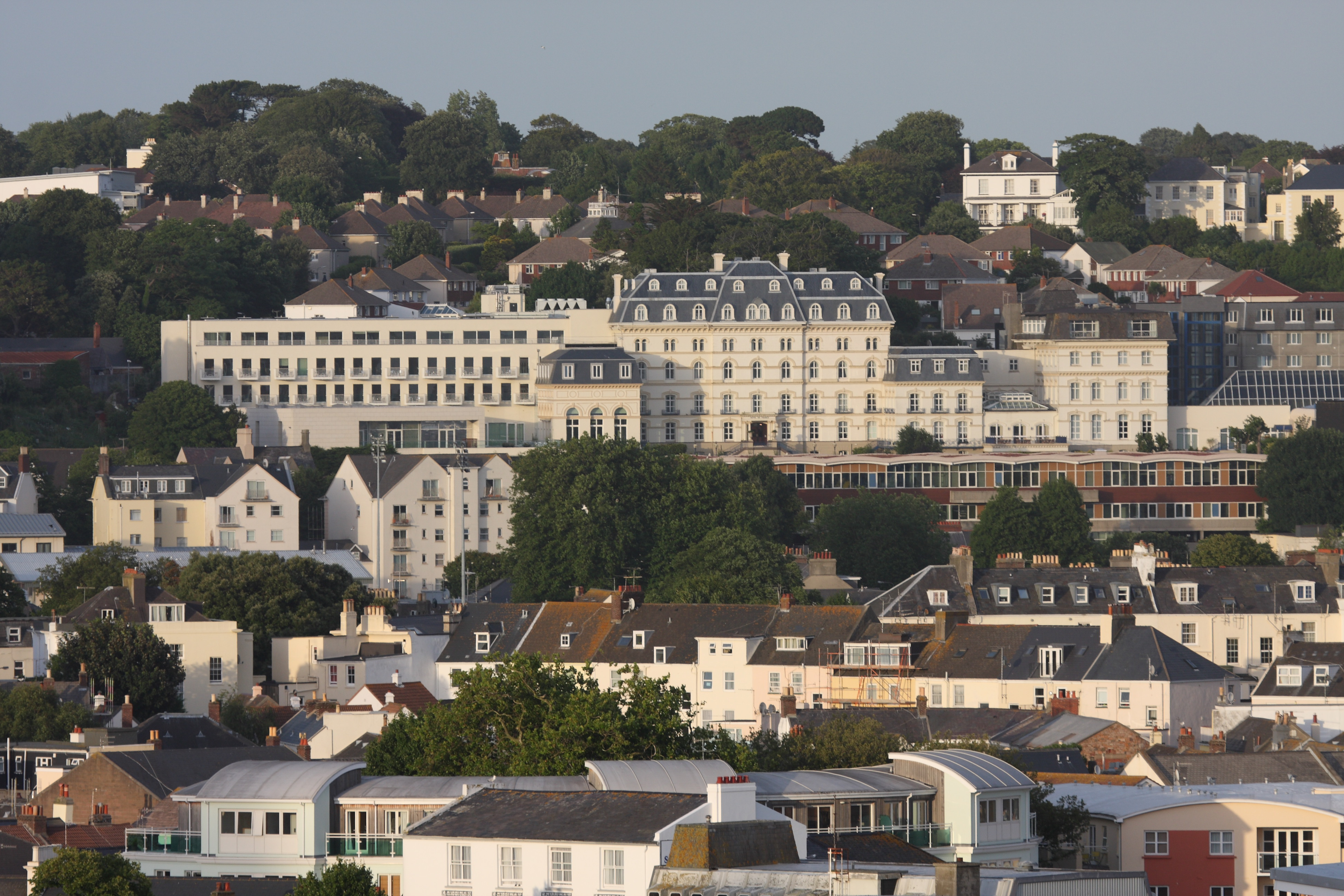
Hotel de France

Hospitality (hotels, restaurants and bars) made up 4.2% of Jersey's GVA in 2019. It is estimated that the wider contribution of tourism in particular is 8.3% (2017). Tourism is important for Jersey's taxation, making £12.5 million in GST (15% of the total). However, total spend is much higher, around £250 million. This creates 6,470 jobs.

Most tourist attractions are operated by private companies and nonprofit organisations, including companies owned, or funded by the States of Jersey. Elizabeth Castle, for example, is controlled by Jersey Heritage. Some other attractions are owned by the National Trust for Jersey. One notable attraction is Jersey Zoo in Trinity, a wildlife park founded by conservationist Gerald Durrell.

=== Transport, storage and communication ===
This sector accounted for 3.5% of GVA during 2019. In December 2020, this sector had 1,950 private sector jobs in transport and storage and 1,810 private sector jobs in information and communications.

Most of the telecoms infrastructure is owned by Jersey Telecom.

In December 2020, there were 154,300 vehicles registered in Jersey.

In 2008, most goods imported and exported were transported by Huelin-Renouf, Condor Logistics, and other smaller operators, via either Saint Helier harbour, or Jersey Airport.

During the period 1984 to 1994, British Channel Island Ferries were responsible for much shipping to and from the United Kingdom.

== Genuine Jersey ==
Genuine Jersey is a brand icon found on products made locally within the island. The brand was launched in 2001 by local businessmen who wanted to differentiate their products from imported goods and is now particularly visible island-based brand that supports local businesses and promotes island products broadly to locals and visitors. Jersey holds an enviable positions amongst island jurisdictions for its internationally famous products such as Jersey milk and the Jersey Royal potato. The use of the word "Jersey" in the name of these products helps to connect place with product branding and to build the recognition of the island brand. The Genuine Jersey organisation has various links with the Government of Jersey and the organisation exists in a public-private sphere in Jersey's small island political and commercial landscape. In restaurants, Genuine Jersey dishes can have 20% non-local ingredients. Contemporary green politics allows the Genuine Jersey brand to align itself with environmental goals in the modern age of buying local.

== Cost of living ==
Jersey has a high cost of living, due to transport costs and a lack of competition. In January 2021, Numbeo, an online cost-of-living index, reported that Jersey was the "world's 'most expensive place to live'."

=== Inflation ===
In Jersey, inflation is based on the All Items Retail Prices Index (RPI). In March 2020, this stood at 182.1, where June 2000 is 100. The largest increases in RPI were in housing, household services, leisure services. Underlying inflation, as measured by the annual change in RPI(Y), increased by 2.3% over the twelve months to March 2020.

Historically, the highest RPI change was in September 2008 at 6.4% and the lowest was in September 2009 at -0.6%.

Annual average API (2000 = 100)
Year	Inflation	Year	Inflation
1949	4.3	1985	47.8
1950	4.4	1986	49.6
1951	4.6	1987	51.9
1952	4.9	1988	55.5
1953	5	1989	60
1954	5.1	1990	65.7
1955	5.3	1991	71
1956	5.6	1992	75.3
1957	5.9	1993	78.2
1958	6.1	1994	80.3
1959	6.3	1995	83.2
1960	6.3	1996	85.8
1961	6.4	1997	89
1962	6.7	1998	92.9
1963	7	1999	96.2
1964	7.2	2000	100.4
1965	7.4	2001	104.2
1966	7.7	2002	108.7
1967	7.8	2003	113.4
1968	8.2	2004	118.9
1969	8.5	2005	122.6
1970	9.1	2006	126.4
1971	10	2007	131.8
1972	10.7	2008	137.9
1973	11.8	2009	138.9
1974	14.3	2010	142.5
1975	17.4	2011	148.9
1976	20.2	2012	153.6
1977	23.4	2013	155.9
1978	25.9	2014	158.5
1979	29.1	2015	159.5
1980	33.6	2016	162.2
1981	37.3	2017	167.2
1982	40.1	2018	173.8
1983	42.5	2019	178.8
1984	44.9		

== Seasonal workers ==
The workforce in Jersey tends to increase during the summer months, with around 3,500 more people employed in the summer of 2008 than in the winter of 2007. These seasonal workers are mostly employed in agriculture, hotels, restaurants and bars.

== International economic relationships ==
Jersey has long been part of the UK's customs area. When the UK was part of the European Union, Jersey was part of the European Union Customs Union. In 2018, Jersey became part of a customs union with the United Kingdom. Therefore, there are no tariffs between the territories and a common external tariff on places outside the customs union. However Jersey retains the ability to impose specific prohibitions and restrictions at its border and retain autonomy in customs systems and fiscal matters.

Most of Jersey's physical linkages are with southern Great Britain, rather than the geographically nearer northern France. Almost all freight capacity is UK-related, not EU-related. Despite this, the finance industry means Jersey has economic (particularly financial) linkages with countries all over the world, particularly with emerging markets. In 2014, Jersey had a global trade surplus of £600 million (18% of national output), but a trade deficit with the UK of £500 million.

== See also ==
- Channel Islands Lottery
