= 1990 Jersey general election =

- 17 October 1990 (Senators); 29 November 1990 (Deputies)

34 of the 52 seats in the States Assembly
	Majority party
Party	Independents
Last election	34
Seats won	34 / 34

The 1990 Jersey general election was held in two rounds in 1990, with six of the twelve senatorial seats in the States Assembly elected on 17 October and all of the 28 deputy seats elected on 29 November. As in previous elections, all candidates ran as independents.

== Results ==
=== Results for senators ===
The results for the election of senators were as follows:

Party	Candidate	Votes	%	±%
Independent	Corrie Stein	12,643	14.5	
Independent	Pierre Horsfall	11,741	13.5	
Independent	Reg Jeune	10,457	12.0	
Independent	Terry Le Main	10,124	11.6	
Independent	Nigel Quérée	9,784	11.2	
Independent	Tony Chinn	9,058	10.4	
Independent	Mike Wavell	8,675	10.0	
Independent	David Crespel	5,694	6.5	
Independent	Stuart Syvret	4,672	5.4	
Independent	Adrian Walton	2,469	2.8	
Independent	Peter Venables	1,783	2.0	
Rejected ballots		58	0.1	
Total votes		87,158	100	
Turnout		18,856	40.7	

=== Results for deputies ===
The results for the elections for deputies were as follows:

==== St Brelade No. 1 ====
Party	Candidate	Votes	%	±%
Independent	Beadle	359	48.1	
Independent	Trigg	163	21.8	
Independent	Pryor	124	16.6	
Independent	Barker	100	13.4	
Total votes		746	100	
Turnout		746	44.9	

==== St Brelade No. 2 ====
Party	Candidate	Votes	%	±%
Independent	Jordan	1,081	40.8	
Independent	Huelin	826	31.2	
Independent	Thorne	743	28.0	
Total votes		2,650	100	
Turnout			39.3	

==== St Clement ====
Only 2 candidates stood for the 2 seats in St Clement, so no election was held.

==== Grouville ====
Only one candidate stood for Grouville's single seat, so no election was held.

==== St Helier No. 1 ====
Party	Candidate	Votes	%	±%
Independent	Crespel	754	24.4	
Independent	Blampied	674	21.8	
Independent	Rabet	538	17.4	
Independent	Bourniquel	384	12.4	
Independent	Shelton	382	12.3	
Independent	Walton	364	11.8	
Total votes		3,096	100	
Turnout			36.0	

==== St Helier No. 2 ====
Party	Candidate	Votes	%	±%
Independent	Bailhache	672	27.3	
Independent	Rumboll	503	20.4	
Independent	Buesnel	479	19.4	
Independent	Johns	436	17.7	
Independent	Wallser	373	15.1	
Total votes		2,463	100	
Turnout			27.9	

==== St Helier No. 3 ====
Party	Candidate	Votes	%	±%
Independent	Baudins	1,663	24.7	
Independent	Frank Walker	1,623	24.1	
Independent	Terry Le Sueur	1,109	16.5	
Independent	Stuart Syvret	1,108	16.5	
Independent	Rumboll	978	14.5	
Independent	Tomlinson	243	3.6	
Total votes		6,724	100	
Turnout			34.3	

==== St John ====
Only one candidate stood for St John's single seat, so no election was held.

==== St Lawrence ====
Only 2 candidates stood for the 2 seats in St Lawrence, so no election was held.

==== St Martin ====
Only one candidate stood for st Martin's single seat, so no election was held.

==== St Mary ====
Party	Candidate	Votes	%	±%
Independent	Maltwood	343	72.4	
Independent	Morris	131	27.6	
Total votes		474	100	
Turnout			49.9	

==== St Ouen ====
Only one candidate stood for St Ouen's single seat, so no election was held.

==== St Peter ====
Only one candidate stood for St Peter's single seat, so no election was held.

==== St Saviour No. 1 ====
Only one candidate stood for St Saviour No. 1's single seat, so no election was held.

==== St Saviour No. 2 ====
Party	Candidate	Votes	%	±%
Independent	Clarke Halifax	650	47.9	
Independent	Le Geyt	353	26.0	
Independent	Breckon	267	19.7	
Independent	Miller	86	6.3	
Total votes		1,356	100	
Turnout			35.6	

==== St Saviour No. 3 ====
Party	Candidate	Votes	%	±%
Independent	Wavell	478	71.9	
Independent	Le Quesne	187	28.1	
Total votes		665	100	
Turnout			35.6	

==== Trinity ====
Only one candidate stood for Trinity's single seat, so no election was held.
