= Last Shop Standing =

Last Shop Standing may refer to:

- Last Shop Standing (book), a 2009 book by Graham Jones
- Last Shop Standing (film), a 2012 British documentary film based on the book
