= Stuart Syvret =

Jersey politician

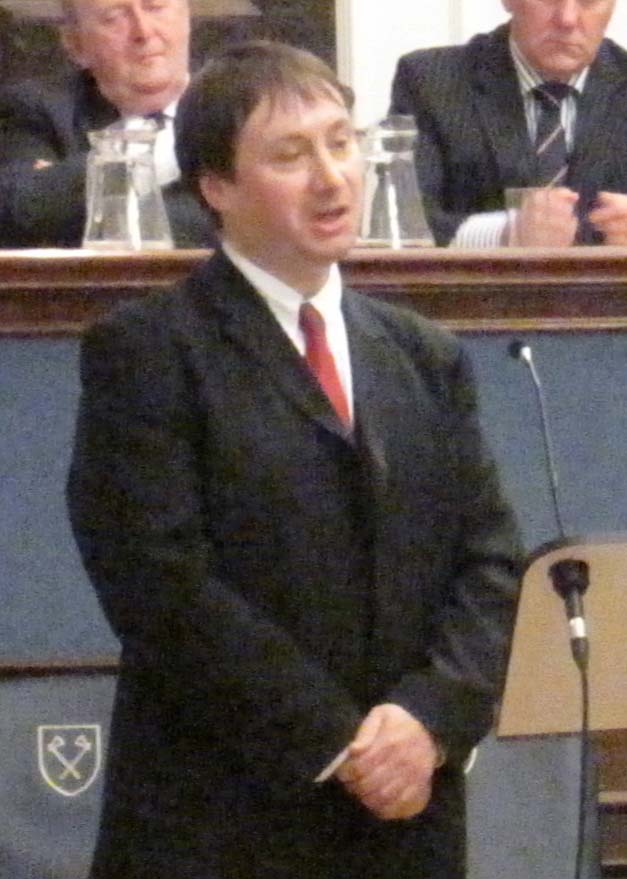
- Stuart Syvret at St Helier Parish Hall at the nominations for Senator, September 2011

Minister for Health and Social Services
- In office Dec 2005 – Sep 2007
- Preceded by: None

Senator
- In office Nov 2005 – Apr 2010
- Constituency: Jersey
- Majority: 15,131 (13.1%)
- Website: EX-SENATOR STUART SYVRET BLOG

Stuart Syvret is a former Jersey politician. He held elected office as a member of the States Assembly from 1990 to 2010. From 1999 to 2007, Svyret had executive responsibilities first as president of the Health and Social Services Committee and, after the 2005 constitutional reforms, as Minister for Health and Social Services in the Council of Ministers. He was dismissed from ministerial office in September 2007 and returned to the backbenches until he was disqualified from membership of the States in April 2010 due to his absence from the island. He has been involved in a series of legal proceedings, as a defendant in a criminal prosecution in Jersey and as a claimant in judicial review and civil claims in Jersey and London.

He has been described by journalists as "the 'bete noire' of Jersey politics", a "self-taught intellectual", an "agitator", "critical of the finance industry", "one of the island's most outspoken senators" "a rarity, an anti-establishment Jersey politician", "a maverick politician" and having a "ludicrous vision of a corrupt state bent on limitless cover-ups, victimisation and systematic injustice".

== Early life and education ==
Stuart Syvret was born in Jersey and educated at Halkett Place School, St Helier Boys School and Highlands College. He obtained City and Guilds Craft and Advanced Craft in carpentry and joinery and went on to become a Member of the Institute of Carpenters. He was a cabinet maker before entering politics.

== Electoral history ==
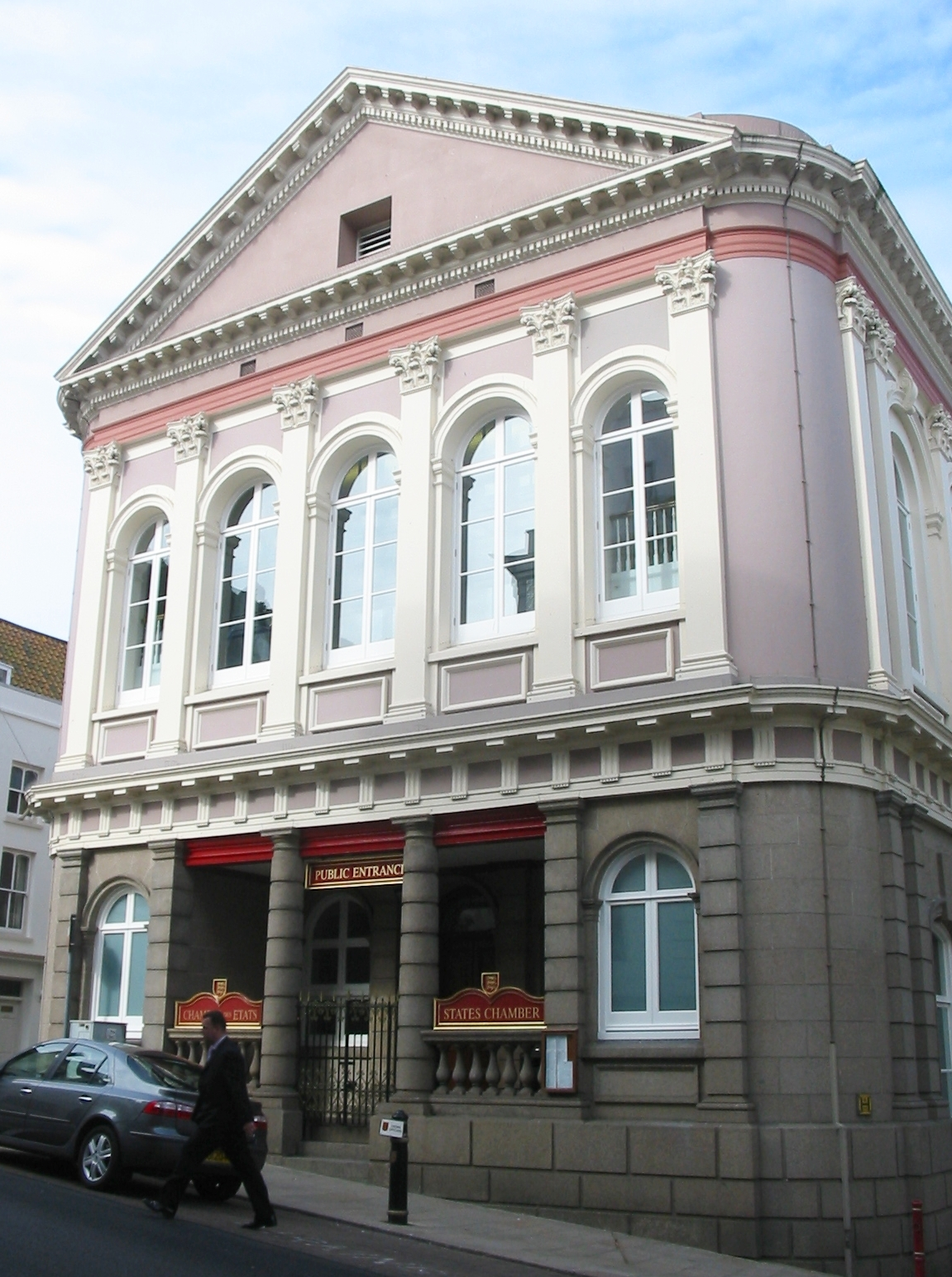
States of Jersey building, the island's parliament, St Helier

=== Deputy 1990–1993 ===
Syvret was elected, at his third attempt, to the States of Jersey in 1990 for a three-year term as Deputy of Saint Helier District 3&4 as a member of the Jersey Green Party.

=== Senator 1993–2010 ===
Standing as an independent, Syvret was elected for a six-year term as Senator in 1993, coming second in the poll for six vacant seats with 14,388 votes. He was re-elected in 1999, coming top of poll with 15,212 votes, and in 2005 (again top of poll for six vacant seats with 15,131 votes).

In accordance with the States of Jersey Law 2005, Syvret was disqualified from his senatorial seat in April 2010 due to 6 months' absence from the island. He had gone to live in London during his trial in Jersey for data protection and motoring offences.

=== Unsuccessful attempts at re-election ===
On his return from London in 2010, Syvret unsuccessfully fought a by-election in June 2010. He came second out of a field of nine candidates, polling 3,437 votes.

He was a candidate for senator in the October 2011 elections. He failed to be elected, finishing seventh out of 13 candidates for four vacant seats with 6,402 votes.

== Early years in the States assembly ==
During his first nine years as a States member, Syvret held various positions including chairing a committee on Freedom of Information and membership of the House Committee, Establishment Committee, Public Services, Legislation Committee, and Employment and Social Security Committee.

Syvret voiced concerns over nuclear power production in France. He clashed with local trade unions when he campaigned against the renewal of a lease to Shell for its aviation fuel depot at Jersey Airport, in protest over the company's activities in Nigeria.

Svyret opposed proposals for the Limited Liability Partnerships (Jersey) Law 1997, which was sponsored by two UK accountants firms. During the debate, Syvret stated "Senator Jeune has, in his capacity as president of the Policy and Resources Committee, used his influence to speed up the Law Drafting process and get this matter brought through. He has spoken on this matter in the House and at Committee meetings, even though he has a financial interest in this matter". Reginald Jeune was a founding partner in one of Jersey's largest law firms Mourant, du Feu & Jeune. That firm was engaged by two accounting firms from the UK to assist them in getting this controversial law on the Statute book. Reginald Jeune had stood down as a partner for the law firm several years previously. It was not disputed that he was engaged as a consultant by the law firm, and continued to have an office and secretary in the firms headquarters. He claimed that he did not know that his law firm was acting for Price Waterhouse, that his position in the law firm was an honorary one, and that his office and secretarial support from that law firm were to assist him in his States work. These claims were never investigated. The Bailiff Sir Philip Bailhache, as presiding officer of the States assembly, subsequently wrote to Syvret, referring to the standing order which stated "No Member shall impute improper motives to any other Member", saying "you have not provided me with any evidence to justify those imputations", inviting Syvret to discuss the matter, and giving notice that matter would be put to the States assembly after the summer recess. At the States assembly on 3 September 1996, Syvret refused to withdraw his statement, and was not allowed to speak. Members voted by 36 to 3 (with 4 abstentions) in favour of the proposition "That Mr. Syvret be suspended from the service of the States until he has withdrawn, by notice in writing to the Greffier, his imputations of improper motives against Senator Jeune". In an interview shortly afterwards, Syvret told The Observer, "I was not allowed to defend myself. This is like something out of George Orwell's 1984.... I was not allowed to defend myself, to speak on my behalf". UK MP Austin Mitchell described the States of Jersey's conduct in the matter as that of a "legislature for hire" and he sponsored an early day motion in the UK Parliament critical of Syvret's suspension. The States of Jersey subsequently agreed to set up a committee of inquiry into procedural matters relating to the drafting of the legislation.

On 4 March 1997, Svyret returned to address the States Assembly and stated that he alleged only that Senator Jeune had breached Standing Orders 43 and 44 of the States of Jersey. As Syvret had not alleged improper motives against Senator Jeune he therefore could not withdraw an allegation which he had not made; Syvret left the States meeting and the States then resolved to censure him but to lift his suspension. In April 1998, Michael Beloff QC, sitting as a Commissioner of the Royal Court, struck out legal proceedings brought by Syvret challenging the legality of his suspension from the States assembly on the ground that the court had no jurisdiction over the legislature's internal procedures.

== Committee president and Minister for Health and Social Services ==
From 1999 to 2005, Syvret was President of the Health and Social Services Committee in the committee-based system of administration that existed at that time.

With the start of a new system of ministerial government in December 2005, Syvret was one of two candidates for the post of Chief Minister, along with Senator Frank Walker. In a secret ballot on 5 December 2005, the States' assembly elected Walker to be the first Chief Minister in Jersey history by 38 votes to Syvret's 14.

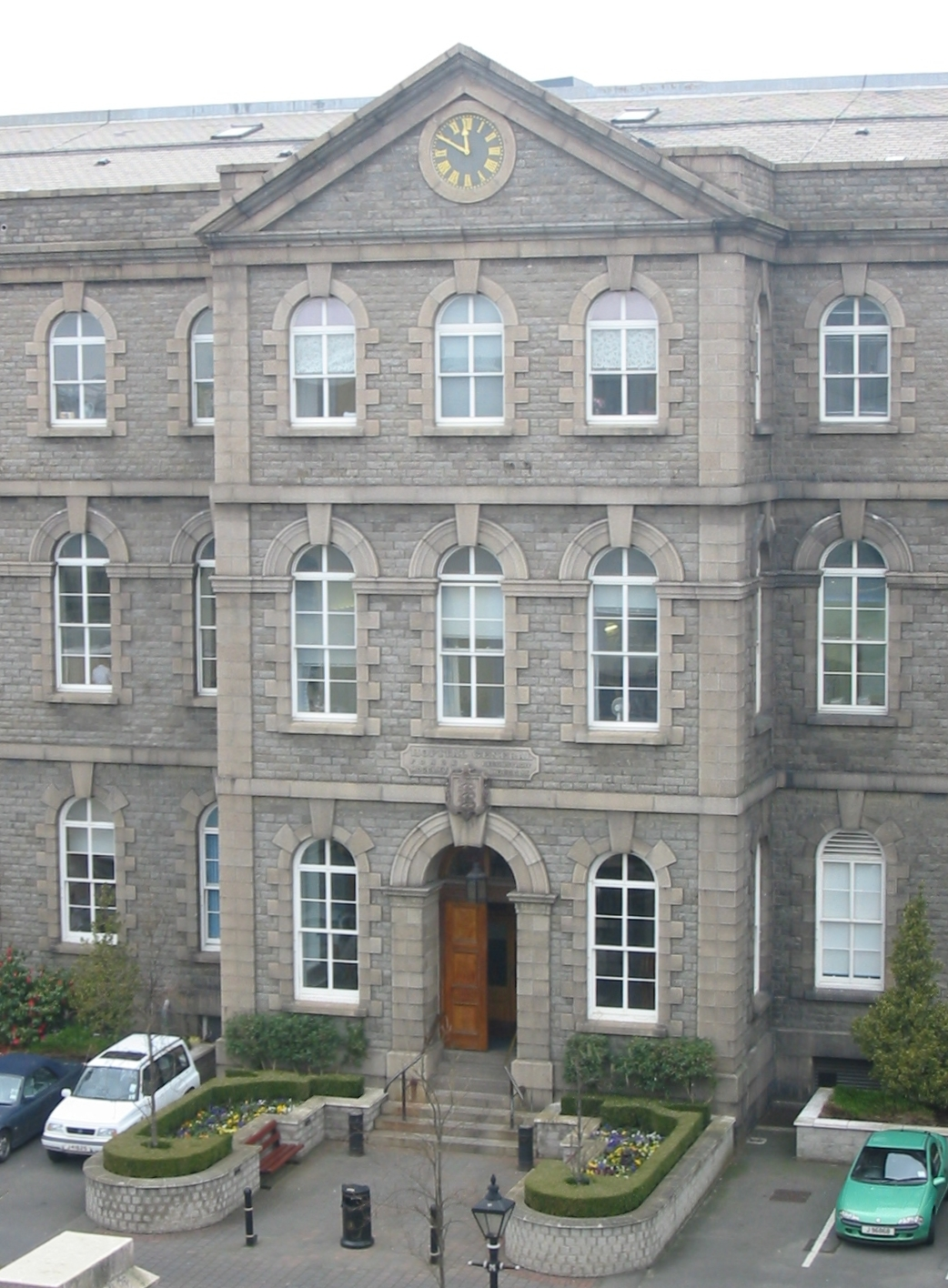
The General Hospital, St Helier

Syvret was, however, elected as Minister for Health and Social Services in the Council of Ministers. He was immediately faced with trying to resolve "a bitter dispute between nurses and health service management". In 2006, he proposed legislation to ban smoking in eating places and subsequently a ban on smoking in all enclosed workplaces. He opposed a policy for a new private hospital in St Helier. He was criticized by the Health and Social Services scrutiny panel for pressing ahead with plans to close two hospital wards and transfer patients to private care homes before the panel had completed its inquiry. He subsequently described the scrutiny report "a waste of time and money".

In October 2006, Syvret openly clashed with ministerial colleagues in a debate about whether to exempt food, medicine and other household necessities from the new General Sales Tax. In December 2006, he was reported to be disillusioned and considering stepping down from politics. Relations with ministerial colleagues continued to deteriorate: in February 2007, the Chief Minister called an emergency meeting of the full Council of Ministers to discuss an open letter Syvret had sent to a property developer who had proposed a private hospital in Jersey, in which Svyret had been critical of many aspects of government policy. The 3,000-word letter, which dealt with "environmental, taxation and social policies and the relationship between government and business", had initially been submitted to the Jersey Evening Post (JEP) for publication "but rejected because editorially unacceptable conditions were attached"– though Syvret's letter was published in full by the JEP on 6 February 2007. On 8 February 2007, Walker and Syvret issued a joint statement that Syvret would be remaining a minister. The States Privileges and Procedure Committee commenced out an inquiry into whether Syvret had breached the code of conduct, prompting complaints about the way in which it was handling the case; Syvret walked out of the committee's private hearing, arguing that the proceedings were a breach of his human rights. On 2 March 2007, the committee cleared Syvret of breaching the members' code but the chairman of the committee instigated a debate in the States of Jersey assembly to express disapproval of Syvret's actions in relation to the open letter. Members (including Syvret himself) voted 29 to 8 to censure his actions.

In July 2007, returning to the States assembly after a period of illness, Syvret – answering a question to him in his role as minister – made scathing criticisms of officials in the Children's Service and other agencies for "bitterly failing" vulnerable young people. A week later, the Council of Ministers announced three investigations into whether the States were failing to protect children from abuse and neglect.

The following day, Syvret faced calls for his resignation as minister from the chair of the Jersey Child Protection Committee, who alleged that Syvret had breached data protection law relating to a child abuse victim (an allegation Syvret denied). Walker, the Chief Minister, also told Syvret to resign. In turn, Syvret dismissed the chair of the Jersey Child Protection Committee. In August 2007, Syvret's assistant minister resigned and relations between Syvret and senior officials were reported as being "at breaking point". Svyret wrote to 2,500 staff telling them they could "blow the whistle" on management anonymously. On 22 August, the Data Protection Commissioner determined that Syvret had broken data protection law by releasing "personal and highly sensitive information about a child who has been subjected to sexual abuse", a finding that Syvret rejected. The following day, the Council of Ministers announced that a former director of Devon County Social Services had been appointed to carry out a "wide ranging" inquiry into childcare and child protection in Jersey, which Syvret dismissed as having "absolutely no chance whatsoever of truly digging out and exposing all this issues".

On 12 September 2007, the States assembly held a six-hour debate on Chief Minister Frank Walker's proposition to dismiss Syvret from ministerial office, which Walker said was prompted solely by Syvret's "reprehensible behaviour in recent weeks". Members voted in favour of Syvret's dismissal by 35 to 15.

== Return to the backbenches ==
From September 2007 to April 2010, Syvret was a backbencher in the States assembly. On 5 December 2007, as "Father of the House", Syvret was called on to make what is usually a short and uncontroversial speech to mark the last sitting of the assembly before Christmas; instead Syvret made an emotional plea to Chief Minister Frank Walker and other politicians for being, Syvret claimed, complicit in covering up "decades of child abuse".

=== Svyret's blog ===
On 22 January 2008, Syvret launched a blog. Material published on the blog prompted an investigation commissioned by the States of Jersey Employment Board following complaints from civil servants that they were harassed. The report by Christopher Chapman found that Syvret had harassed States employees and that the Employment Board had not done enough to defend staff.

Other material posted on the blog by Syvret was to lead to his prosecution for breaches of the Jersey Data Protection Law over his naming of "Nurse M" (see below).

In February 2014, Google closed down the Stuart Syvret blog at the request of the Jersey authorities. A copy of the blog reappeared almost immediately on Blogger and later a new blog with the same title appeared, not hosted by Blogger.

=== Advocacy for child abuse investigation ===
In February 2008, a States of Jersey Police investigation into historic child abuse began to be widely reported in the news media around the world. Syvret and others called on the UK Home Secretary Jack Straw to appoint English prosecutors and judges to deal with what Syvret called "the child protection crisis". Syvret himself was criticized for declining assistance from a former head of New Scotland Yard's paedophile unit during his tenure as health minister. In May 2008, Syvret made a formal complaint to the police claiming that senior civil servants had perverted the course of justice by covering up abuse of children in care homes.

During 2008, an independent report by Alan Williamson commissioned by the States in response to Syvret's claims concluded that no children in care in Jersey were currently at risk, while a review by the Howard League for Penal Reform was critical of the regime that had operated at Greenfields, one of the island's children's homes, during Syvret's time as minister.

=== St Helier Waterfront development ===
In June 2008 Syvret brought a vote of no confidence against the Council of Ministers in relation to the Waterfront (a major development in St Helier) – it was defeated by 41 votes to eight.

=== Judicial review in London ===
In July 2008, Syvret and UK Liberal Democrat MP John Hemming began preparations to seek judicial review in London of what they saw as Jack Straw's failure to ensure that Jersey's authorities protected child abuse victims. In March 2009, the Administrative Court refused permission for the case to proceed to a full hearing. Syvret subsequently complained that the hearing was a "farrago", the two judges (Lord Justice Richards and Mr Justice Tugendhat)–who he described as "Allies of the Jersey oligarchy" – were biased and that the High Court hearing was "absurdly short", resulting in "a clear breach of British jurisprudence and of Article 6 of the ECHR".

=== Robust dealings with States members ===
Syvret's robust dealings with fellow States members continued in August 2008, when he compared a Jewish senator to a Nazi war criminal in an argument about General Sales Tax. Syvret was at the receiving end of barbed comments in March 2009, when Senator Jim Perchard, the Health Minister, told Svyret to consider committing suicide – a comment that led to Perchard's resignation.

=== Blog article about "Nurse M" ===
==== Publication of police report ====
In March 2009, it was reported that the States of Jersey Police were reviewing an earlier investigation into allegations that a nurse had killed many patients at Jersey's General Hospital, following claims made by Syvret on his blog. The blog article, the Jersey Court of Appeal later explained

published, inter alia, a confidential States of Jersey Police report written in May 1999 by the then Detective Inspector Barry Faudemer ("the Faudemer Report") which related to an investigation into the conduct of a named nurse at the Jersey General Hospital. Mr Syvret identified the nurse whom we will call X. He described Nurse X so identified, inter alia, as a mass murderer and a psychopath, and identified another nurse whom we will call Y who had, he claimed, failed to reveal significant information about X.

==== Syvret arrested ====
On 6 April 2009, ten police officers went to Syvret's home, where they arrested him and carried out an extensive search of the property. Syvret was held in custody for seven hours and questioned about alleged breaches of Jersey data protection law in relation to his naming of "Nurse M". The Jersey Evening Post criticized police tactics, as did MPs in the UK Parliament. An emergency sitting of the States assembly was called – though the assembly subsequently voted against a proposition critical of the police's actions. Svyret's lawyer complained that data protection laws were being used to restrict his freedom of expression, contrary to human rights. In 2011, the police conceded that the arrest could have been handled better.

==== Syvret prosecuted for data protection and motoring offences ====
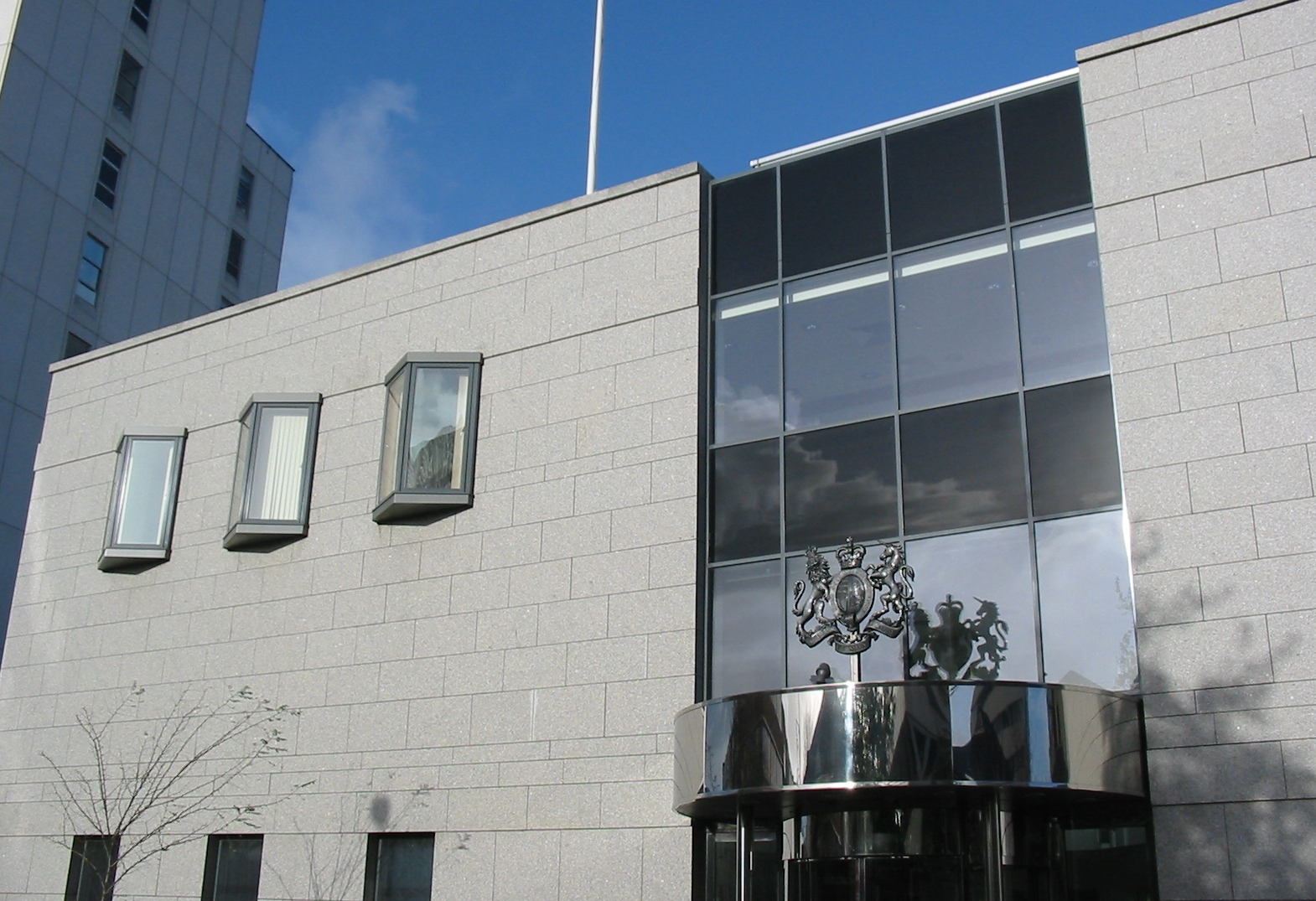
The Magistrate's Court, St Helier

On 18 June 2009, Syvret appeared before at the Magistrate's Court charged with driving without a valid licence between September 2006 and April 2008. On 9 July 2009, Syvret was charged with breaches of data protection laws relating to his blog article about "Nurse M". Syvret pleaded not guilty and argued that his prosecution was an abuse of process and the charges should be struck out. On 22 July 2009 the prosecuting advocate stated the case against Mr Syvret which included the allegation – "Mr. Syvret’s comments on the blog were to the effect that Nurse # was clearly a dangerous homicidal maniac and that investigation into him had been stopped for political or corrupt reasons, leaving the people of Jersey in danger. In fact the May 1999 report was followed by intensive police investigation authorised by the Attorney General. An extremely experienced police officer Mr. Faudemer led that investigation for the police, and the investigation concluded that there was insufficient evidence against Nurse #, and Nurse # was never charged. Mr. Syvret did not make any of this clear on his blog and does not appear to have troubled to find out the full facts in advance."

The proceedings were to turn out to be lengthy involving: 20 separate hearings in the Magistrate's Court lasting 35 days in total, nine hearings in the Royal Court lasting 15 days, and three days in the Jersey Court of Appeal. Throughout the proceedings Syvret repeatedly complained that he was not being given relevant evidence by the prosecution. Matters came to head in October when Syvret submitted evidence to the court which he asserted proved that the 1999 police investigation had been a "catastrophic failure". The prosecuting advocate argued indirectly that the quality of the investigation was not relevant. On 12 October 2009 the Magistrate stated "I think the case would probably benefit from some clarity from both sides on exactly what the allegations are and what the defence is." Syvret stated "it is abundantly clear that the 1999 investigation was in fact catastrophically defective, indeed far, far more so and more alarmingly so than even I originally thought. This has belatedly become known to the Crown, they have recognised this, they now see that they have no remote case against my public interest disclosure argument. So now at this 59th minute of the 11th hour they are trying to rule inadmissible that entire argument that the Defence case has been built on and has been established on for the recent months". He stated that the court was going to rule against him, as the court eventually did. He stated: "Well I have to make it plain now, you will have to instruct the police to arrest me because I’m not turning up before this court any further" After this hearing Syvret was offered the services of an experienced advocate assigned to him under the island's legal aid scheme. He declined the offer.

The data protection charge was brought under Article 55 of the Data Protection (Jersey) Law 2005, which creates the offence of disclosing personal data but permits disclosure where it is "necessary for the purposing preventing crime" or is "justified as being in the public interest". During the lengthy proceedings, Sir Christopher Pitcher sitting as a Commissioner of the Royal Court explained the legal issues at stake: Syvret was, the Commissioner said,

... not being prosecuted for disclosure of the Faudemer report in itself; had that been done with names omitted he would not have been prosecuted. The Prosecution rests and stands or falls upon his disclosure of the name of Nurse M. For this reason the adequacy of the investigation in 1999 is not an issue. Had the investigation been impeccable, and still concluded there was insufficient evidence to prosecute Nurse M, exactly the same issues would have arisen had the appellant disclosed Nurse M’s name ten years later. That is an essential point when it comes to relevance, which unhappily, the appellant does not grasp.

Throughout the proceedings, Syvret claimed that identifying "Nurse M" was justified in the public interest "to get the authorities moving in relation to minimising the risk that Nurse M presents" and "to alert the Jersey public to the risk" Nurse M presented (in particular to avoid his being employed as a nurse in a private care home). These public interest justifications were rejected in the Magistrate's Court and, on appeal, by the Royal Court.

At the outset of the proceedings, Syvret made an application to the Royal Court in August 2009, arguing that the Assistant Magistrate was biased against him, as was the Commissioner of the Royal Court hearing that application. Sir Richard Tucker rejected these submissions and ordered him to pay costs. When the case resumed in the Magistrate's Court, Syvret sought to call the Attorney General, several senior civil servants, the suspended police chief Graham Power and other police officers, and Deputy Carolyn Labey (his former partner) as witnesses.

==== Syvret leaves Jersey for six months ====
Syvret's arrest was ordered on 23 October 2009 when he failed to attend court for the second time that week, having traveled to London where he said he was claiming "legal asylum". He returned to Jersey more than six months later on 4 May 2010 and was arrested and bailed.

==== Trial resumes in May 2010 ====
When the case resumed in the Magistrate's Court in August 2010, Syvret told the court that he was suffering from clinical depression and sought an adjournment of the proceedings.

On 4 September 2010, Syvret appealed to the Jersey Court of Appeal against the Royal Court's ruling in August 2009. Miss Clare Montgomery QC, sitting as Court of Appeal judge, refused leave to appeal, holding that "the Commissioner was right not to recuse himself".

On 27 September 2010 Syvret applied to the Royal Court for judicial review of the continuing prosecution; the application was refused. (An appeal against this decision was refused in July 2011).

==== Syvret convicted ====
On 14 October 2010, Syvret was convicted by the Magistrate's Court of the motoring offences, when the Assistant Magistrate criticized the police as overreacting in the way they arrested Syvret. On 17 November 2010, the court found Syvret guilty of the data protection offences and guilty of contempt of court on account of his non-attendance and words of disrespect. The prosecuting Attorney General made two charges against Syvret for the aforementioned blogging of the Faudemer Report. The charges came under the Data Protection (Jersey) Law, Articles 55, 17, and 21. The opinion on these two charges by Assistant Magistrate Mrs B. Shaw of the Magistrate's Court was published online. Syvret refused the option of community service and was jailed for ten weeks, fined £4,200 and ordered to pay £10,000 in legal costs. He was granted bail by the Royal Court the following day, pending an appeal. On 17 June 2011, Syvret made a further claim for judicial review to the Royal Court relating to the prosecution. The application was refused by Commissioner Pitchers and an appeal to the Jersey Court of Appeal (consisting of Michael Beloff QC, Clare Montgomery QC and Christopher Nugee QC) was dismissed.

==== Appeal ====
Syvret's appeal against conviction to the Royal Court, Commissioner Sir Christopher Pitchers presiding, started on 1 August 2011. Syvret maintained that he was protecting the public by naming "Nurse M" on his blog and argued that the motive of the police in searching his home when he was arrested was to find evidence to discredit former police chief Graham Power and former deputy police chief Lenny Harper. The Royal Court repeated criticisms of the police actions in raiding Syvrets' home, arresting him and keeping him in custody. The court also held that in the Magistrate's Court the prosecution "lead some evidence which went further than was necessary in supporting the robustness of the 1999 enquiry" but found that the Assistant Magistrate's conclusions had not been influenced by this. The court rejected Syvret's submissions that disclosure of the nurses' names was justified as being in the public interest. The court added that "The public interest is served by measured, responsible and accurate reporting. The way that the appellant dealt with the information that he had was none of these". The court dismissed Syvret's appeal on the data protection offences but allowed his appeal in relation to two counts of contempt of court.

Syvret indicated that he was now prepared to accept community service and was sentenced to 80 hours for contempt of the Magistrate's Court. The fine was reduced to £1,400 and legal costs to £5,000. However, by early November 2011, Syvret had not carried out any of the community service sentence, and on 2 November 2011 he was re-sentenced by the Magistrate to eight weeks in prison; Syvret's appeal to the Royal Court was dismissed, as was a subsequent application to reopen the appeal. The jail sentence was extended by a further month and six days for non-payment of the fine. He was released from prison on 30 December 2011.

==== Reaction to conviction ====
The Jersey Data Protection Commissioner described the conviction as "an historic landmark in the international world of data protection, as it is the first of its kind relating to the publication of personal data via an internet blog". In September 2011, in response to a question, the Attorney General told the States assembly that prosecution legal costs were £384,000. Syvret has stated that he intends to take his case to the European Court of Human Rights. In the House of Commons, an Early Day Motion sponsored by John Hemming MP critical of Syvret's imprisonment attracted only two signatures.

=== Civil action against the States ===
In 2010, Syvret commenced a civil action in the Royal Court against the Chief Minister, the States Employment Board and the Attorney General of Jersey. He sought damages for harm suffered as a result of his dismissal as a minister in 2007 which he argued left him to "shoulder and carry the burden – virtually single-handedly, of investigating many examples of child protection failure and concealed child abuse". Jonathan Sumption, sitting as a Commissioner of the Royal Court, struck out his case.

== Relations with Tax Justice Network ==
On 10 April 2007 the Jersey Evening Post reported that Syvret had accused the Tax Justice Network of blackmailing him, an accusation strongly denied. Senator Syvret complained to the police, but subsequently stated the matter was not worth pursuing.
