= Wendy Kinnard =

Jersey politician

Minister for Home Affairs
- In office 8 December 2005 – 21 October 2008
- Preceded by: Office established
- Succeeded by: Andrew Lewis

Senator of Jersey
- In office 1996–2008

Personal details
- Born: Jersey
- Education: University of Winchester; Open University

Wendy Kinnard is a Jersey former politician who served as a Senator of Jersey from 1996 to 2008 and as Jersey's Minister for Home Affairs from 2005 until her resignation in 2008. Before the introduction of ministerial government in Jersey, she held senior posts in the States committee system, including in Home Affairs and Legislation.

== Early life and education ==
Kinnard was born in Jersey. She received a Diploma of Higher Education in Social and Environmental Problems from the University of Winchester in 1980, and a BA in Applied Social Sciences from the Open University in 1990. Before entering the States, she served as a lay magistrate on the Youth Court Panel from 1993 to 1996.

== Political career ==
=== Election to the States ===
Kinnard was first elected to the States of Jersey as a Senator in the 1996 island-wide senatorial election. She placed fourth among the six elected candidates, with 10,520 votes. She was re-elected in 2002, placing second among the six elected candidates with 12,230 votes.

=== Committee government ===
During the period of committee government, Kinnard held a number of States posts. She was Vice-President and later President of the Legislation Committee between 1996 and 1999, and served as President of the Building Costs Inquiry from 1998 to 2003. She also served in Home Affairs between 1999 and 2008, initially under the committee system and later as minister, and was a member of the Policy and Resources Committee from 2002 to 2005. Her other committee roles included service on the Housing, Employment and Social Security, and Health and Social Services committees, and as a States-appointed trustee of the Community Relations Trust.

=== Minister for Home Affairs ===
On 8 December 2005, following Jersey's move from committee government to ministerial government, Kinnard was elected as Minister for Home Affairs.

As minister, Kinnard brought forward Jersey's first formal Criminal Justice Policy in 2007. The policy proposed action plans covering criminal justice values, statistics, support for victims, joint working, early intervention, enforcement, dealing with offenders and rehabilitation. In January 2008, she approved publication of a consultation report on a draft Discrimination (Jersey) Law, intended to create a general statutory framework for prohibiting discrimination in areas including employment, education, goods and services, clubs and premises.

By July 2008, the Jersey Evening Post reported that Kinnard and Chief Minister Frank Walker had said they would stand down at the 2008 elections. On 21 October 2008, the Chief Minister informed the States that Kinnard had resigned as Minister for Home Affairs. In her statement to the States, Kinnard said her resignation followed the Council of Ministers' refusal to consider changes to judicial directions on corroboration in criminal trials involving accomplices, sexual offences and children. She was succeeded in the portfolio by Andrew Lewis.

== Later public work ==
Kinnard later gave evidence to the Independent Jersey Care Inquiry. The Inquiry cited her evidence that she did not believe ministers had wanted to cover up abuse, but that they had wanted the issue to recede and had tended to minimise it.

In 2022, a Government of Jersey ministerial decision report named Kinnard among four people proposed to carry out statutory reviews of decisions to place children in secure accommodation. The report described her as an independent member of the Children and Young Person's Placement Panel.
