= 1993 Jersey general election =

- 20 October 1993 (Senators); 25 November 1993 (Deputies)

34 of the 52 seats in the States Assembly
	Majority party
Party	Independents
Last election	34
Seats won	34 / 34

The 1993 Jersey general election was held in two rounds in 1993, with six of the twelve senatorial seats in the States Assembly elected on 20 October and all of the 28 deputy seats elected on 25 November. As in previous elections, all candidates ran as independents.

== Results ==
=== Results for senators ===
The results for the election of senators were as follows:

Party	Candidate	Votes	%	±%
Independent	V Tomes	16,392	15.0	
Independent	Stuart Syvret	14,388	13.2	
Independent	J Rothwell	9,586	8.8	
Independent	A Bailhache	9,020	8.3	
Independent	J Le Maistre	8,934	8.2	
Independent	R Shenton	8,755	8.0	
Independent	D Carter	8,433	7.7	
Independent	S Baudains	7,139	6.5	
Independent	J De Carteret	6,380	5.8	
Independent	J Dorey	3,622	3.3	
Independent	T Jordan	3,121	2.9	
Independent	G Jennings	2,793	2.6	
Independent	B Shelton	2,605	2.4	
Independent	P Manton	2,543	2.3	
Independent	R Backhouse	2,329	2.1	
Independent	G Thorne	2,150	2.0	
Independent	D Richardson	1,031	0.9	
Rejected ballots		66	0.1	0.0
Total votes		109,287	100	—
Turnout		23,936	50.5	+9.8

=== Results for deputies ===
The results for the elections for deputies were as follows:

==== St Brelade No. 1 ====
Party	Candidate	Votes	%	±%
Independent	Alastair Layzell	644	69.3	
Independent	Margaret Beadle	279	30.0	
Rejected ballots		6	0.6	
Total votes		929	100	—
Turnout		929	50.8	+5.9

==== St Brelade No. 2 ====
Party	Candidate	Votes	%	±%
Independent	Gary Matthews	744	26.8	
Independent	Graham Huelin	724	26.0	
Independent	Graham Thorne	688	24.7	
Independent	Tom Jordan	602	21.7	
Rejected ballots		22	0.8	
Total votes		2,780	100	—
Turnout		1,802	42.8	+3.5

==== St Clement ====
Party	Candidate	Votes	%	±%
Independent	Len Norman	1,340	42.8	
Independent	Harry Baudains	1,152	36.8	
Independent	Malcolm McEwen	631	20.2	
Rejected ballots		5	0.2	
Total votes		3,128	100	—
Turnout		1,802	39.6	

==== Grouville ====
Party	Candidate	Votes	%	±%
Independent	Imogen Nicholls	476	33.4	
Independent	Graeme Rabet	419	29.4	
Independent	David Cadoret	309	21.7	
Independent	Daniel Murphy	200	14.0	
Rejected ballots		23	1.6	
Total votes		1,427	100	—
Turnout		1,427	51.4	

==== St Helier No. 1 ====
Party	Candidate	Votes	%	±%
Independent	Paul Routier	699	28.0	
Independent	David Crespel	614	24.6	
Independent	Jeremy Dorey	598	24.0	
Independent	Ronald Blampied	575	23.0	
Independent	Harry Cole	150	6.0	
Rejected ballots		9	0.4	
Total votes		2,495	100	—
Turnout		1,153	32.3	−3.7

==== St Helier No. 2 ====
Party	Candidate	Votes	%	±%
Independent	Derek Carter	659	25.8	
Independent	Robin Rumboll	450	17.6	
Independent	Jimmy John	421	16.5	
Independent	Dick Buesnel	373	14.6	
Independent	Angela Trigg	337	13.2	
Independent	Karen Corbel	187	7.3	
Independent	Eric Mahe	114	4.5	
Rejected ballots		16	0.6	
Total votes		2,557	100	—
Turnout		1,057	27.2	−0.7

==== St Helier No. 3 ====
Party	Candidate	Votes	%	±%
Independent	Frank Walker	1,562	20.1	
Independent	Shirley Baudins	1,225	15.7	
Independent	Terry Le Sueur	890	11.4	
Independent	Jacqui Huet	871	11.2	
Independent	John de Carteret	817	10.5	
Independent	Brian West	790	10.2	
Independent	Malcolm L'Amy	735	9.4	
Independent	Geraint Jennings	616	7.9	
Independent	Eric Lucas	265	3.4	
Rejected ballots		10	0.1	
Total votes		7,781	100	—
Turnout		2,491	36.6	+2.3

==== St John ====
Only one candidate stood for St John's single seat, so no election was held.

==== St Lawrence ====
Only 2 candidates stood for the 2 seats in St Lawrence, so no election was held.

==== St Martin ====
Party	Candidate	Votes	%	±%
Independent	Frederick Hill	731		
Independent	David Thelland	663		
Rejected ballots		14		
Total votes		1,408	100	—
Turnout		1,408	50.7	

==== St Mary ====
Only one candidate stood for St Mary's single seat, so no election was held.

==== St Ouen ====
Only one candidate stood for St Ouen's single seat, so no election was held.

==== St Peter ====
Party	Candidate	Votes	%	±%
Independent	Tom du Feu	713	56.5	
Independent	Robin Hacquoil	548	43.5	
Rejected ballots		0	0.0	
Total votes		1,261	100	—
Turnout		1,261	50.6	

==== St Saviour No. 1 ====
Party	Candidate	Votes	%	±%
Independent	Evelyn Pullin	499	28.1	
Independent	Robert Duhamel	439	24.7	
Independent	Clarence Schofield	289	16.3	
Independent	Graeme Pitman	250	14.1	
Independent	Ron Backhouse	192	10.8	
Independent	Peter Venables	85	4.8	
Rejected ballots		23	1.3	
Total votes		1,777	100	—
Turnout		1,004	36.6	

==== St Saviour No. 2 ====
Party	Candidate	Votes	%	±%
Independent	Alan Breckon	433	36.2	
Independent	Margaret Le Geyt	385	32.2	
Independent	Peter Clarke Halifax	377	31.5	
Rejected ballots		1	0.1	
Total votes		1,196	100	—
Turnout		768	31.9	−3.7

==== St Saviour No. 3 ====
Party	Candidate	Votes	%	±%
Independent	Mike Wavell	381	52.0	
Independent	Anthony Nightingale	316	43.2	
Independent	Norman Miller	17	2.3	
Rejected ballots		18	2.5	
Total votes		732	100	—
Turnout		732	38.8	+3.2

==== Trinity ====
Only one candidate stood for Trinity's single seat, so no election was held.
