= Australia Tax =

Phrase relating to higher cost of goods in Australia

Australia Tax is a phrase describing the generally higher prices in Australia of goods and services than equivalent costs in comparative overseas nations such as the United States. This is particularly the case for video games, computer hardware, and software but may extend to non-technological items such as cars, designer clothing and banking services. Companies selling non-physical products which are not subject to the rent and labour of a traditional retail outlet have been particularly criticised. Some prices differences can be as much as 88%.

The phrase was first used by Ed Husic, a federal member of parliament, who brought the issue up in the chamber and subsequently advocated for an inquiry into the problem. The cost of digital goods was the subject of an inquiry by the Australian government in 2013.

== Examples ==
In 2013, the cost of Adobe Systems' Creative Suite 6 Master Collection in Australia was much higher than that of the United States equivalent, retailing at AU$4,334 in comparison to US$2,599 in the United States, although the Australian and U.S. dollars were almost at par. It was calculated at the time that it was cheaper to fly to the United States, purchase a copy of the software, and fly back to Australia. In May 2013, the Adobe Creative Cloud service was launched, offering access to the Creative Suite software on a subscription basis. Australian prices initially were set to AU$62.99 per month in comparison to the United States price of US$49.99 per month, but following an inquiry by the Australian government into regional pricing of digitally distributed goods, Adobe Systems adjusted the Australian price to match that of the United States.

Microsoft was criticised by a report released by the Australian Standing Committee on Infrastructure and Communications titled "At what cost? IT pricing and the Australia tax." The report acknowledged that there were some contributing factors specific to the Australian market which can make it a higher-cost environment for IT vendors compared with other markets, such as Australia's small population and geographical distribution. However, the inquiry did not find that these factors were substantial enough to defend the price increases of products such as Microsoft Office, especially if the product is delivered via the Internet.

== IT pricing inquiry ==
In 2012, the House of Representatives Standing Committee on Infrastructure and Communication began a 12-month investigation into price differences for IT products. The report, mentioned in the preceding section, concluded that IT products are more expensive in Australia because of "regional pricing strategies implemented by major vendors and copyright holders". Ten recommendations were made including the removal of geo-blocking restrictions and lifting restrictions on parallel importing. An amendment to the Competition and Consumer Act, which would void contracts or terms of service seeking to enforce geo-blocking, was suggested, as was the education of the Australian public on ways to circumvent geo-blocking mechanisms. The recommendations were supported by the Australian consumer rights organisation, Choice.

== See also ==
- Rip-off Britain
