= Last Shop Standing (film) =

2012 British documentary film

- Film poster
- Directed by: Pip Piper
- Based on: Last Shop Standing by Graham Jones
- Starring: Phil Barton; Clint Boon; Billy Bragg; Diane Cain; Laurie Dale; Mike Dillon; Dep Downie; Jonathan Draper; Barry Everard; Fatboy Slim
- Cinematography: David Cawley
- Edited by: David Cawley
- Production company: Blue Hippo Media
- Distributed by: Blue Hippo Media
- Release date: September 10, 2012 (United Kingdom)
- Running time: 50 minutes
- Country: United Kingdom
- Language: English

Last Shop Standing: The Rise, Fall and Rebirth of the Independent Record Shop is a 2012 British documentary film directed by Pip Piper. The film is based on the 2009 book Last Shop Standing by Graham Jones.

== Background ==
Last Shop Standing was based on the 2009 book Last Shop Standing by Graham Jones. In 2012, Blue Hippo Media approached Jones about turning the book into a movie. A few days later, they met at a pub having bought Jones a beer and a Ploughman's lunch while he agreed to the idea. To finance the film, the makers posted a clip online informing people they were making a documentary on record shops and asked those interested to invest $25 to receive an advanced DVD copy of the film as well as a "thank you" credit in the end credits. For the film, Jones toured England, Scotland and Wales for interviews with independent record shop owners. Director Pip Piper said he visited record shops every weekend in his early teens in the 1970s. In 2016, the same producers of the film created a documentary film on Norwegian dance music.

== Synopsis ==
The film focuses on an analyses of music sales in the United Kingdom. In the 1970s, there were more than three hundred millions records sold. In the 1980s, there were in the United Kingdom around 2,200 independent record shops. By 2012, however, there were only 269. The film primarily blames the music industry as well as the new competing media of cassettes and compact discs. Multiple independent record shop owners cited the advent of CDs as the end of the boom period for record shops. The film includes interviews with Billy Bragg, Norman Cook, Richard Hawley, Smiths' Johnny Marr, and Paul Weller. Record shops featured in the film include Brighton and Hove record shops as Borderline, Chesterfield's C.E. Hudsons, Birmingham's the Diskery, Rounder Records (where Norman Cook worked), Rough Trade, and Sister Ray. Rounder Records owner David Minns was interviewed for the film.

== Soundtrack ==
The Last Shop Standing soundtrack was donated by independent bands and musicians like Clara Luzia, Half Man Half Biscuit, and the James Clarke 5.

== Release ==
=== International ===
In March 2013, Last Shop Standing played at the 2013 BAFICI international film festival in Argentina.

=== Record Store Day ===
On 20 April 2013, Last Shop Standing became "the official film of Record Store Day." The DVD release was exclusive to record shops participating in Record Store Day and contained 75 minutes of bonus material including interviews with Sid Griffin, Richard Hawley, Johnny Marr, and Paul Weller. The filmmakers encouraged audiences to buy the DVD locally. In Italy, for Record Store Day, DeeJay TV acquired the rights to play it on television and played at five theatre locations: the Astoria Studios in Turin, Centro Sociale Brancaleone in Rome, the Cineteca di Bologna in Bologna, the Flog in Florence, and the Teatro Dal Verme in Milan. Italian radio station Radio Capital gave away free copies of Last Shop Standing. Bristol record shop Rise had a screening in their Friska cafe.

== Reception ==
Last Shop Standing has received critical acclaim from around the world. Il Fatto Quotidiano's Chiara Felice described the film as "interesting." Gazeta Wyborcza's Robert Sankowski reviewed it favourably with "[m]uch better than any story." Le Soir's Didier Stiers called the movie "good." Wonderland's Zing Tsjeng remarked the film was "a love song to the British independent record shop (as well as its surprising resurrection)."

The stories and shops in the Last Shop Standing film partly inspired the Vinyl Revival Record Shop Podcast.
