= VAT-free imports from the Channel Islands =

VAT-free imports from the Channel Islands to the United Kingdom took place for a few years during the early 21st century as a result of low-value consignment relief (LVCR). This is a tax relief that applies to low-valued imports to the European Union, exempting them from value-added tax (VAT). Although the UK was a part of the EU from 1973 until Brexit in 2020, the Channel Islands (two Crown Dependencies) were not and, unlike the UK, they did not charge VAT on purchases. The UK government applied LVCR to imports from the Channel Islands, resulting in the construction of distribution centres on the islands and the export of many low-valued goods from there to the UK. The practice was unilaterally brought to an end in April 2012 by HM Treasury, the finance department of the UK government.

== Background ==
=== Low-value consignment relief ===
When goods are imported into the EU from a non-EU territory, they are generally subject to VAT. (The VAT rate in the UK for most goods has been 20% since 2011). However, as a result of EU Council Directive 2009/132/EC, an optional exception is allowed on shipments of a low value to speed up the transit of low value goods which might otherwise be delayed by customs and also reduce the cost of tax collection where it might not be practicable. This administrative relief is known as low-value consignment relief (LVCR). Member states which allow the relief must ensure that it does not cause competitive distortion or allow VAT abuse.

The maximum allowed value of the goods for which the exception applies is set by the importing state, and can be between €10 and €22. The UK set the limit at £15 (17€) for commercial goods until it abolished LVCR in 2021.

=== United Kingdom ===
Until 2020 the United Kingdom was a member of the EU and, as a member state was obliged to apply European Union value added tax to a range of goods. Total online retail spending online grew by 33.4% in 2007 to a record £10.9bn and UK online sales were predicted to reach £28.1bn by 2011 – 8.9% of all retail sales. The reasons for the success of Internet retail are varied, covering factors related to convenience, time saving, breadth of choice, and price. Nevertheless, the low price offered by online music retailers such as Play.com, Amazon.co.uk, TheHutgroup.com and HMV plays a significant factor in these sites' popularity. A study by the Kantar Group found that in 2009 there was an 18% increase in the volume of online CD sales bought by UK customers. Many or most of these were shipped from the Channel Islands, although they were almost always controlled by UK-registered parent companies. Furthermore, Kantar found that 95% of such sales were low enough that VAT charges were not applied to them.

=== Channel Islands ===
The Channel Islands consist of the Bailiwicks of Guernsey and Jersey, Crown dependencies which are self-governing but historically linked to the Crown. The Channel Islands have a special relationship with the United Kingdom as set out in Protocol 3 to the United Kingdom's Act of Accession 1972, which formed part of the Treaty of Accession. Under this agreement the Channel Islands were not part of the European Union but were part of the customs territory of the union. This meant they did not charge VAT on purchases but there was a free movement of industrial and agricultural goods in trade between the Islands and the Union. Jersey introduced a Goods and Services Tax (GST) of 3% in 2008 which increased to 5% in 2011 on the majority of goods and services supplied in Jersey for local use, including imports. GST can be claimed back on exports.

Historical documentation indicates that LVCR was originally allowed by the UK for the Channel Islands in order to expedite agricultural goods grown in Jersey and Guernsey such as fresh flowers, and daily mail that would have been damaged by the delay caused in VAT processing. More recent documents, including a 2006 States of Jersey Scrutiny Panel, have challenged this claim.

However, in more recent years the Channel Islands were used as a convenient location for selling goods VAT-free into the UK by mail order. Historically, the bulk of mail order goods sold through the Channel Islands were manufactured in the UK, exported to the Islands and then mailed back into the UK VAT-free. As businesses based in the Channel Islands became more sophisticated, however, goods were imported from the Far East, including electronics and accessories.

In a written answer on 18 June 2008 to Janet Dean MP, the then Financial Secretary to the Treasury, Jane Kennedy stated that three quarters of the VAT avoided due to LVCR "was attributable to imports from the Crown dependencies".

== Criticism ==
Retailers, politicians and academics in the United Kingdom said that this situation afforded an unfair and damaging economic advantage to retailers based in the Channel Islands. These retailers were able to offer the same products as UK retailers but at significantly lower prices. The advantage was highlighted by Matt Moulding, CEO of The Hut Group, who was quoted in The Guardian newspaper as saying "If you aren't offshore you couldn't possibly compete. Your cost price would be above what people would be retailing at." The book Last Shop Standing by Graham Jones (one of the founders of Music Distributor Proper Distribution) details the detrimental effect VAT-free mail order had on UK music retail, whilst specialist Internet retailers such as freakemporium.com have cited VAT-free mail order as the main factor in their demise.

=== Specific products ===
The Channel Islands require DVDs sold there to be certified by the British Board of Film Classification and therefore only British-certified DVDs are available from the Channel Islands.

CDs are often licensed to specific territories and record companies strongly defend their regional licensing arrangements, as has been shown by the BPI action against play.com when they tried to bring in major label VAT-free CDs from outside the EU.

Memory cards are subject to similar licence arrangements as CDs and DVDs, so the majority of memory cards sold in the Channel Islands are supplied through EU distributors.

== Business response ==
Some UK businesses have claimed that this kind of VAT avoidance is potentially "abusive", in terms characterised by the 2006 Halifax Judgement. VAT abuse is defined as transactions that, "notwithstanding formal application of the conditions laid down by the relevant provisions of the Sixth Directive and of national legislation transposing it, result in the accrual of a tax advantage the grant of which would be contrary to the purpose of those provisions. Second, it must also be apparent from a number of objective factors that the essential aim of the transactions concerned is to obtain a tax advantage."

In 2005 a group of UK retailers with the help of the UK trade body the Forum of Private Business gave evidence to the All-Party Parliamentary Small Shops Group. This group published in 2006 a report High Street Britain 2015 that covered many issues affecting retail in the UK. In relation to LVCR and the Channel Islands it recommended that "The UK Government should immediately apply the lowest threshold applicable for the relief of low value consignments permissible in the directive, which is currently 10 euros (approximately £7) – this would eliminate the vast majority of exploiting trade almost immediately" it also recommended that "The enforcement, by government bodies like Customs and Excise, of VAT should be reviewed to ensure a level playing field"

Another group of retailers, called the Retailers Against VAT Abuse Schemes (RAVAS) filed a complaint with the EU Directorate of Taxation, alleging that the UK Government had breached the Directive covering LVCR by failing to take action to stop abuse. They said that the UK Government could have stopped the growth of LVCR trade by taking legal action against major retailers under Halifax, or by using its discretion to lower the threshold to €10, remove mail order goods from the relief or request the Channel Islands lose the right to benefit from the relief in relation to DVDs and CDs which is known as a derogation. The retailers argued that by failing to stop abuse of LVCR the UK Government was in breach of the Principal VAT Directive (previously the Sixth VAT Directive) which states that the conditions for EU tax exemptions such as LVCR should be laid down "for the purposes of ensuring the correct and straightforward application of those exemptions" and to prevent any "possible evasions, avoidance or abuse".

== Government reaction ==
=== United Kingdom ===
Due to pressure from UK retailers and trade body the Forum of Private Business (FPB), the Government of the United Kingdom mentioned the LVCR issue in the 2006 Budget wherein they stated "In 1984, a VAT-free threshold on imports of small commercial consignments from outside the EU was introduced at a level of £18, as an administrative relief. The Government is aware that this provision is currently being exploited the relief now costs the Exchequer around £85 million per year. If the relief continues to be exploited by businesses using offshore locations, the Government will consider changes to prevent this type of behaviour". However, the UK Government took no direct action, leaving the Channel Islands governments to regulate the trade internally. The UK Government stated that any action to stop the LVCR trade would damage the Royal Mail.

In early 2010 the UK Treasury issued a statement to The Guardian that said "The implication that businesses are simply setting up on the Channel Islands to take advantage of this relief is not true. In fact exports from the Channel Islands account for a very small percentage of the CD/DVD market".

Significant lobbying by UK retailers affected by LVCR was reported widely on the BBC in 2011.

In 2011 the UK Treasury announced that from 1 April 2012, LVCR would no longer apply to goods imported from the Channel Islands. It was announced on 4 October 2012 that Condor Logistics would close its operations with the loss of about 180 jobs (110 in the UK, 50 in Jersey and 20 in Guernsey). The move was blamed on changes to LVCR affecting the Channel Islands.

=== Jersey ===
The Channel Islands have no say over the operation of Low Value Consignment Relief as they are not members of the EU and the relief is granted to the importer of the goods and not the exporter. However, the Channel Islands, whilst having no direct influence on the tax policies of the UK government, do regularly discuss taxation issues with the UK Treasury and HM Revenue and Customs as demonstrated by the discussions that took place in 2006 regarding Jersey's fulfilment industry policy. Like all EU tax regimes, LVCR is ultimately policed by the EU.

Jersey's Economic Development Minister Philip Ozouf Jr announced in March 2006 a New Jersey fulfilment policy intended to govern the fulfilment industry in the Island and stated that companies who export to the UK by mail order must first obtain a licence. He argued that this was to ensure that the Island was not taken advantage of by UK business and that tangible economic benefits would remain in the Island. In 2007 owing to the bad press generated by the expansion of the fulfilment industry in the Channel Islands, the government of Jersey announced that it had asked certain UK retailers to cease their operations there and that no further licences would be granted for the CD and DVD retailers. The refusal to grant further licences was only applied to the mail order sale of CDs and DVDs – an industry that had become almost entirely based in the Channel Islands – and licences for other products were not controlled to the same degree.

=== Guernsey ===
Guernsey, like Jersey, took steps to protect its international reputation and protect the viability of the fulfilment industry in the Bailiwick. In 2007 a review of the bulk mail export of DVDs and CDs under the LVCR arrangements was announced by the Commerce and Employment Department along with the formation of the Guernsey Mail Order and Fulfilment Group which was made up of retailers and fulfilment operators based in the Bailiwick.

In 2008 the Fulfilment Group together with the Guernsey authorities created a Code of Conduct. The Code was voluntary and acknowledged that in the UK there had been some cause for concern with regards to the relocation of UK companies to the Channel Islands to benefit from the LVCR concession, in particular with the CD and DVD market. It looked to address these concerns through the mutual co-operation of the Guernsey Mail Order and Fulfilment Group and laid down similar trade restrictions to those covered by the Jersey Licence Scheme, although unlike that scheme the only sanction available to those breaking the code appeared to be exclusion from the Fulfilment Group. The Guernsey authorities also said that three of the largest retailers on the Island had agreed to voluntary caps on the amount of VAT that they could avoid by way of LVCR.
