= Clare Montgomery =

British barrister

Clare Montgomery KC
- Born: 29 April 1958 (age 68)
- Education: University College London
- Occupations: Barrister and judge

Clare Patricia Montgomery KC (born 29 April 1958) is a barrister at Matrix Chambers, recorder of the Crown Court and deputy High Court judge. She sits on the Court of Appeal of Jersey.

== Education ==
She studied at Millfield School and University College London.

== Legal career ==
Montgomery was called to the Bar in 1980 and was made Queen's Counsel in 1996.

She undertook pupillage at 2 Gray's Inn Square with Peter Leighton, Keith Knight and Charles Welchman. She received a Senior Award from Gray's Inn (1980) and became a Master of the Bench in 2002.

Montgomery's profile on the Matrix Chambers website describes her as a "specialist in criminal, regulatory and fraud law, perhaps best known for her work on legally and factually complex cases.". The British press have reported on her being involved as an adviser to Prince Andrew in relation to FBI enquiries in the Epstein/Maxwell affair; in so doing, papers including the Times and Telegraph have pointed out that she had (in 1998) also assisted General Pinochet in defending extradition proceedings.

=== Judicial career ===
Montgomery was appointed as an Assistant Recorder (1999), a Recorder (2000), a deputy High Court Judge (2003) and to the Court of Appeal of Jersey.

== Publications ==
- Editor with Professor David Ormerod of Fraud: Criminal Law and Procedure (OUP 2008)
- Practitioner editor of chapter on commerce, financial markets and insolvency in Archbold Criminal Pleading Evidence & Practice (since 1993)
- Co-authored The Law of Extradition and Mutual Assistance 2nd Ed (OUP 2007)
- 'Forensic science in the trial of Sally Clark' (2004) article in Med Sci LJ

== Personal life ==
Montgomery is married and has two daughters.
