= Corrie Stein =

Former Jersey politician

Corrie Stein (born 1940) is a former politician in the States of Jersey as deputy for the Parish of Grouville and as senator.

== Biography ==
Corrie Stein was born on 18 October 1940, in The Hague, the Netherlands. She was educated in the Netherlands.

She was elected to the States in the elections of 1981 as deputy for the Parish of Grouville. She was one of the first women members in the States. As a deputy, she fought against the flooding of Queen's Valley, and successfully prevented the development of 100 homes in a parish field.

She stood for and was elected as senator in the elections of 1990, and topped the poll. As senator, she held presidencies of various States Committees, including the Housing Committee and the Industrial Relations Committee, which put forward proposals on employment legislation.

She remained in the States as a senator until 2002, when she failed to be re-elected in the Jersey general election of 2002.

She now lives in Dinard.

== Sources ==
- Jersey Evening Post
- Election Manifesto
