= Channel Islands Lottery =

State lottery in the Channel Islands

The Channel Island Lottery
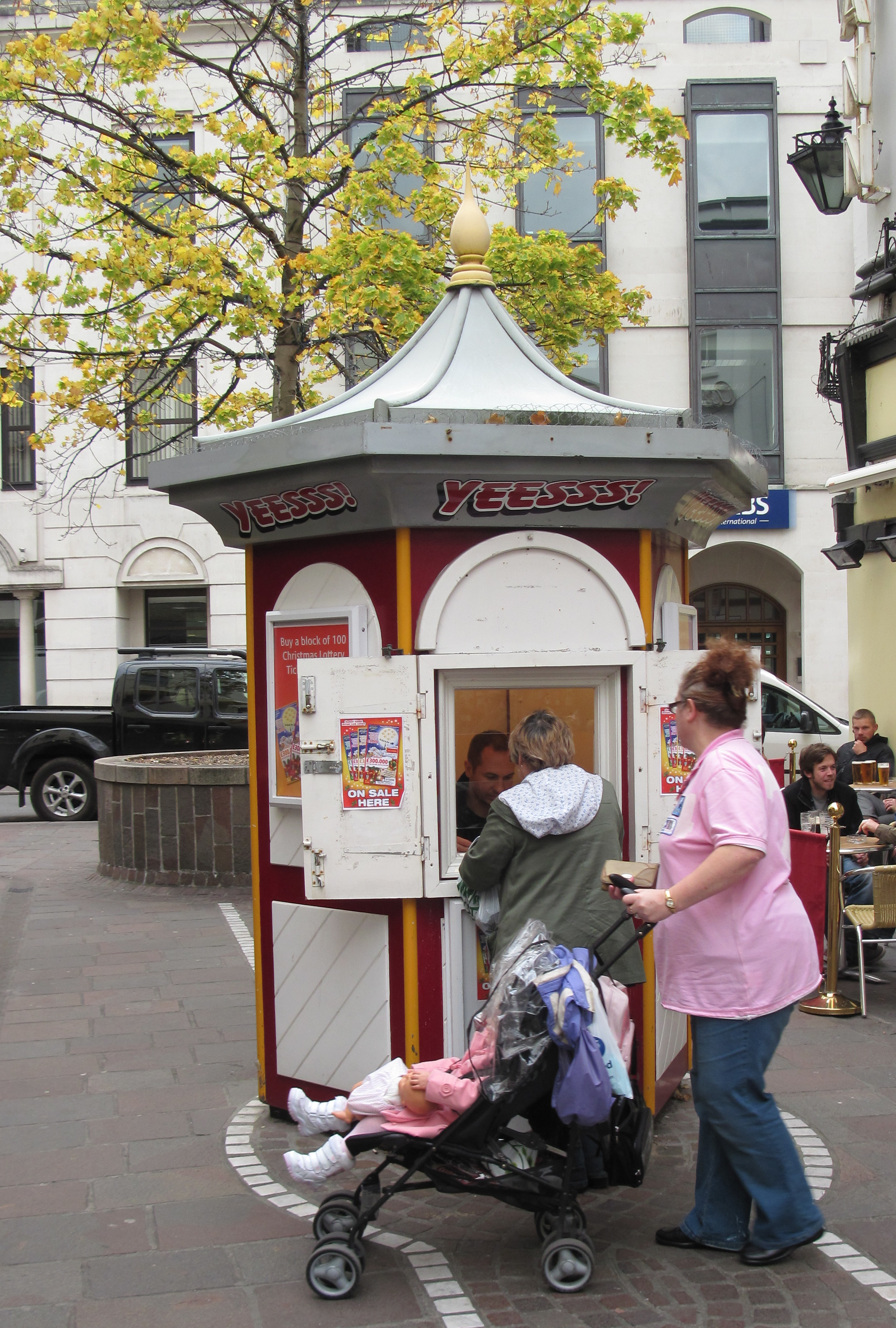
- Selling 2011 Christmas draw tickets at a kiosk in Saint Helier, Jersey
- First draw: 1975
- Operator: States of Jersey, States of Guernsey.

The Channel Island Lottery, sometimes known as the CI Lottery, is the State lottery in the Channel Islands run jointly by the States of Jersey and States of Guernsey. The first draw was held in 1975.

== History ==
The Channel Islands Lottery was founded in 1975 with the merger of the Jersey Lottery and the Guernsey Lottery. The Jersey Lottery was established in 1966 and the Guernsey Lottery in 1971. The game is the oldest lottery in the British Isles, established before those in Ireland (1987) and the United Kingdom (1994).

Jersey's share of the profits from the lottery were initially used to finance the transformation of Fort Regent into a sports and entertainment complex. On the completion of that project, the States of Jersey agreed that the Jersey part of the profits from the Channel Islands Lottery should be applied to charitable purposes, through the Association of Jersey Charities.

Scientific Games International has managed the lottery since 2011.

A scratchcard instant game was introduced to revitalise the traditional draw in 1997.

On 29 June 2012, a summer draw was launched with a million £2 lottery tickets going on sale. The main prize, had all tickets being sold, would have been £1 million, with a further £300,000 in smaller prizes. However ticket sales were much lower than anticipated, and the main prize was only £150,000, with £300,000 in smaller prizes. The summer lottery was cancelled in 2013.

=== Proposals to replace with the United Kingdom National Lottery ===
Since the launch of the National Lottery in the United Kingdom in 1994 there have been proposals to replace the Channel Islands Lottery by making United Kingdom lottery ticket sales available in the Channel Islands. The Government of Jersey favours this as this would triple the amount given to good causes. However some residents feel this would lose them their independence. Foreign tickets are not currently sold in the Islands. The Islands are not eligible for Good Causes Funding, although the UK National Lottery Act 2006 provides for the eventuality that the Channel Islands may participate.

The UK's other Crown Dependency, the Isle of Man participates in the UK National Lottery.

== Games ==
The main game is a scratchcard game where the maximum prize is £20,000 which replaced draw based games in 2004. There is also the Christmas Super Draw which is part scratchcard, part draw based. The jackpot for the 2016 Christmas Draw was £1,120,220.
