= Pierre Horsfall =

Jersey politician

Pierre Horsfall CBE

Personal details
- Spouse: Thelma (married 1963 - 2021)
- Children: 1
- Committees: Policy and Resources Committee

Pierre Horsfall CBE (born c. 1938) is a retired hotelier and politician from Jersey. He was a member of the States Assembly from 1975 for 27 years, and as the President of Policy and Resources committee he was Jersey's most senior politician.

On 24 June 2021, it was announced that Horsfall would be a founding member of the soon-to-be-launched Jersey Liberal Conservatives party, founded by former External Relations Minister Philip Bailhache.
