= Last Shop Standing (book) =

2009 book by Graham Jones

Last Shop Standing: Whatever Happened to Record Shops?
- Author: Graham Jones
- Cover artist: James Weston
- Language: English
- Publisher: Proper Music Publishing Ltd
- Publication date: 2009
- Publication place: United Kingdom
- ISBN: 978-0956121202

Last Shop Standing: Whatever Happened to Record Shops? is a 2009 book by Graham Jones. It was translated into Italian as The 33rd Turn by publisher Arcana.

== Background ==
=== Book ===
Jones is a record sales representative for 25 to 30 years at a small music distributor, Proper Music, in the United Kingdom. Beginning at his job, Jones counted 2,200 independent record shops across the country but by 2009 there were only 269. In a conversation with his "Auntie", after asking "How are things in the land of record shops?", Jones said his aunt had asked if record shops were going the way of candlestick makers, coin shops, and stamp shops. This talk inspired Jones to write his book Last Shop Standing. For writing, he toured the country and interviewed staff at 50 record shops. The tour itself took three months, while writing the book took about a year.

He endorsed the 2009 opening of a Chippenham record shop in Wiltshire, England. On 11 May 2010, commenting on the closure of Berwick Street's Vinyl Junkies, Jones attributed the closure of record shops to the new market landscape. On 16 April 2014, commenting on both Record Store Day and low-value consignment, Jones said "The news was overshadowed by the Pasty Tax, but it was a huge boost. [...] Overnight, the shops were selling at the same price as online." On 3 July 2014, Jones gave a talk on the record industry at the Woodley bookstore Chapter One in Berkshire, England.

=== Film ===
In 2012, Blue Hippo Media approached Jones about turning the book into a movie. A few days later, they met at a pub having bought Jones a beer and a Ploughman's lunch while he agreed to the idea. The film focuses on an analyses of music sales in the United Kingdom. The film includes interviews with musicians Billy Bragg, Norman Cook, Smiths' Johnny Marr, and Paul Weller. For the film, Jones did another tour to interview independent record shop owners in the countries of England, Scotland and Wales.

=== Podcast ===
In 2020, the stories of Last Shop Standing inspired the Vinyl Revival Record Shop Podcast.

== Reception ==
Gazette and Herald's Scott McPherson commented Last Shop Standing has "attracted plenty of media attention." As of 2013, there have been five editions and the book "sold very well."

Jones has announced that a follow-up to Last Shop Standing will be released on 21 September 2018, entitled 'The Vinyl Revival and the Shops that Made it Happen'.
