= Rakuten.co.uk =

Former British online retail website

- Website type: Cashback site
- Available in: English
- Owner: Rakuten Group
- Website: www.rakuten.co.uk
- Commercial: Yes
- Registration: Required for purchases
- Launched: 1998 (as Play.com)
- Current status: Cashback website (launched 2024)

Rakuten.co.uk is a British Cashback website operated by the Japanese e-commerce company Rakuten Group.

The website was relaunched in 2024, as part of the global Rakuten Rewards platform, which operates in the USA, Canada, Spain, Germany and the UK.

The site originated as Play.com, an online retailer of entertainment products founded in 1998 in Jersey.

Rakuten acquired Play.com in 2011 and relaunched the platform as a third-party marketplace in 2013 after changes to UK tax regulations affecting retailers operating in the Channel Islands.

The Play.com website was replaced by Rakuten.co.uk on 23 March 2015.

Rakuten discontinued the UK marketplace in August 2016. The domain was later repurposed as a loyalty portal offering Rakuten "Superpoints" rewards for purchases made through partner retailers, before relaunching as part of the global cashback program.

== History ==
=== Play.com ===
Former Play.com logo following its purchase by Rakuten

The business was founded in 1998 under the name Play247.com, but rebranded as Play.com in 2000. Play.com originally sold region 1 and 2 DVDs only, but since expanded its range to include CDs and video games and other electronic items. In 2004 it began to sell books and electronics, in 2006 it started selling personal computers, posters and T-shirts and in 2007 it started selling HD DVDs and Blu-rays, with sister site PlayUSA.com selling region 1 DVDs, HD DVDs and region A Blu-ray Discs and offering sales in a range of currencies. The site's interface was redesigned on a number of occasions.

Play.com was ranked second on the November 2006 UK "Hot Shops List" compiled by IMRG and Hitwise.

In 2008, Play.com started selling DRM-free MP3s, clothing, accessories, and tickets for events, allowing customers to buy and sell tickets. They also held a consumer games show which was open to the public, with tickets available through Play.com. This event was backed by Sony, Microsoft, Ubisoft, Activision, and THQ among others.

On 15 January 2009, a survey published by Verdict Research found Play.com was the UK's second favourite music and video retailer, behind first place Amazon.co.uk and ahead of the now defunct entertainment retailer Zavvi which was third. On 24 February 2009, it was reported that Play.com had topped the National Consumer Satisfaction Index, ahead of Amazon.co.uk and iTunes.

In May 2009, Play.com launched a branded Visa credit card in partnership with MBNA. Cardholders received points for purchases made on the website and at other retailers. Points could then be redeemed against products bought on the Play.com website.

The PlayUSA.com website was closed down in February 2011. In September 2011, Japan-based Rakuten purchased Play.com for £25 million.

From March 2013, Play.com operated solely as an online marketplace, where third party retailers sold products with their listings hosted on the website.

=== Rakuten Rewards UK ===
In April 2024, the platform relaunched as part of Rakuten Rewards Global, offering Cashback to UK based users on a range of stores including supermarkets, electronics and more.
