= Low-value consignment relief =

EU tax exemption on imported goods

Low Value Consignment Relief (LVCR) was an optional form of tax exemption that was applied to some goods entering the European Union. When goods are imported from a non-EU territory, those goods may be subject to customs duty, excise duty and value-added tax. However, between 2009 and 2021, member states could allow an exception on low value shipments in the form of an EU administrative VAT relief known as Low Value Consignment Relief. It was governed by the EU Council Directive 2009/132/EC.

== History ==
LVCR was an optional form of VAT relief designed to speed up the transit of low value goods through the mail which might otherwise be delayed by customs and also to reduce the cost of tax collection where it might not be practicable. Member states, if they decided to allow this relief, could set it at a maximum limit of between €10 (£8) and €22 (£18), but had to ensure that it was applied in a way that did not cause competitive distortion or allow VAT abuse. After the Brexit transition period, the UK withdrew LVCR meaning that all imports to the UK have attracted VAT regardless of their value since 1 January 2021. The European Union implemented changes from 1 July 2021 that effectively ended LVCR.

== Channel Islands ==
An example of the use of LVCR was found in the LVCR allowed by the UK on shipments originating from the Channel Islands. While this was in place, internet-order fulfilment centres were set up in the Channel Islands for the postal distribution of packages valued under £18 (€22). In 2011 the UK Treasury announced that from 1 April 2012, LVCR would no longer apply to goods imported to the UK from the Channel Islands. It was announced on 4 October 2012 that Condor Logistics would close its operations with the loss of about 180 jobs (110 in the UK, 50 in Jersey and 20 in Guernsey). The closure was blamed on changes to LVCR affecting the Channel Islands. In August 2013, Huelin-Renouf, which had operated a lift-on/lift-off container service for 80 years between the Port of Southampton and the Port of Jersey, ceased trading, although the business was later taken up by a market entrant, Channel Island Lines.

== See also ==
- European Union value added tax
