= Great Britain and Ireland =

Great Britain and Ireland may refer to:

- The United Kingdom of Great Britain and Ireland, the sovereign state created in 1801, combining the former Kingdom of Great Britain with Ireland, separated by the Anglo-Irish Treaty of 1921
- Great Britain and Ireland, the two largest islands in the British Isles
- The present-day United Kingdom and the Republic of Ireland, two sovereign states
  - Ireland–United Kingdom relations, the relations between the Republic of Ireland and the United Kingdom

== See also ==
- Terminology of the British Isles
