= Demographics of Jersey =

Jersey is the most populated of the crown dependencies and of the Channel Islands. The Demographic statistics of the island includes population density, ethnicity, education level, health of the populace, economic status, religious affiliations and other aspects of the population.

The population of Jersey has grown in each census record since 1931 (although those did not include records during the Occupation by Nazi Germany).

== History ==
Historical population
Year	Pop.	±%
1821	28,600	—
1831	36,582	+27.9%
1841	47,544	+30.0%
1851	57,020	+19.9%
1861	55,613	−2.5%
1871	56,627	+1.8%
1881	52,445	−7.4%
1891	54,518	+4.0%
1901	52,576	−3.6%
1911	51,898	−1.3%
1921	49,701	−4.2%
1931	50,462	+1.5%
1939	51,080	+1.2%
1951	55,244	+8.2%
1961	59,489	+7.7%
1971	69,329	+16.5%
1976	71,018	+2.4%
1981	76,050	+7.1%
1986	80,212	+5.5%
1989	82,809	+3.2%
1991	84,082	+1.5%
1996	85,150	+1.3%
2001	87,186	+2.4%
2011	97,857	+12.2%
2021	103,267	+5.5%
Other estminates 2019 estimate

The resident population of Jersey has been increasing during the last 60 years. The resident population increased by 9,100 between 2010 and 2011. The estimated 2020 growth rate is 0.72%.

Pre-census data, there are a number of estimates for Jersey's population. It was around 2,000 in 4000-3000 BC; 6,000 in 1050; 10,000 in 1331; and between 10,000 and 20,000 in the 16th and 17th centuries.

From the 16th to 19th centuries, Jersey was home to a number of French religious refugees, possibly up to 4,000 at a time. In the first half of the 19th century, tax advantages and a better climate saw a boom in Jersey's population. This also needed a large immigrant population, with significant movement from Scotland and Ireland.

Before 1851 and 1921, Jersey's population fell significantly, but the number of French people rose by more than 3,000. These were mostly agricultural workers (not replacing the British migrants).

From 1821, Jersey conducted an annual census (figures to the right). In 1951, the population was 55,244. It has grown every decade since then, and the rate of growth now is very high (1% per year in 2019). This is due to the growth of the finance industry and tourism.

== Population ==
In 2021, the total resident population of Jersey is 103,267, although the CIA World Factbook estimates it as 101,073 (this may be due to a different estimate).

=== Geographic distribution ===
Jersey is divided into twelve parishes. The most populous parish is St Helier, with 35% of the island's population. In 1798, around 6,000 people lived in St. Helier, or one-fifth of the island's population at the time.

Population by parish
Parish	2011 population	2021 population	% of total	Population per km^{2}
Saint Helier	33,522	35,822	35	3716
Grouville	4,866	5,401	5	658
Saint Brélade	10,568	11,012	11	830
Saint Clement	9,221	9,925	10	2262
Saint John	2,911	3,051	3	332
Saint Lawrence	5,418	5,561	5	556
Saint Martin	3,763	3,948	4	384
Saint Mary	1,752	1,818	2	277
Saint Ouen	4,097	4,206	4	274
Saint Peter	5,003	5,264	5	448
Saint Saviour	13,580	13,904	13	1498
Trinity	3,156	3,355	3	267

=== Structure of the population ===
Population by Sex and Age Group (Census 27.III.2011):

Age group	Male	Female	Total	%
Total	48 296	49 561	97 857	100
0–4	2 466	2 549	5 015	5.12
5–9	2 470	2 382	4 852	4.96
10–14	2 729	2 573	5 302	5.42
15–19	2 863	2 632	5 495	5.62
20–24	3 006	2 938	5 944	6.07
25–29	3 351	3 354	6 705	6.85
30–34	3 670	3 566	7 236	7.39
35–39	3 615	3 610	7 225	7.38
40–44	4 183	4 180	8 363	8.55
45–49	4 187	4 170	8 357	8.54
50–54	3 536	3 662	7 198	7.36
55–59	2 955	3 087	6 042	6.17
60–64	2 832	2 818	5 650	5.77
65–69	1 938	2 110	4 048	4.14
70–74	1 732	1 900	3 632	3.71
75–79	1 343	1 550	2 893	2.96
80–84	822	1 183	2 005	2.05
85–89	446	779	1 225	1.25
90–94	115	368	483	0.49
95+	37	150	187	0.19
Age group	Male	Female	Total	Per cent
0–14	7 665	7 504	15 169	15.50
15–64	34 198	34 017	68 215	69.71
65+	6 433	8 040	14 473	14.79

Population by Sex and Age Group (Census 21.III.2021):

Age group	Male	Female	Total	%
Total	51 003	52 264	103 267	100
0–4	2 425	2 237	4 662	4.51
5–9	2 732	2 682	5 414	5.24
10–14	2 638	2 719	5 357	5.19
15–19	2 654	2 521	5 175	5.01
20–24	2 928	2 723	5 651	5.47
25–29	2 985	2 885	5 870	5.68
30–34	3 293	3 295	6 588	6.38
35–39	3 660	3 686	7 346	7.11
40–44	3 755	3 774	7 529	7.29
45–49	3 773	3 822	7 595	7.35
50–54	4 234	4 211	8 445	8.18
55–59	4 101	4 091	8 192	7.93
60–64	3 294	3 413	6 707	6.49
65–69	2 547	2 747	5 294	5.13
70–74	2 279	2 511	4 790	4.64
75–79	1 524	1 809	3 333	3.23
80–84	1 227	1 496	2 723	2.64
85–89	658	976	1 634	1.58
90–94	242	479	721	0.70
95+	54	187	241	0.23
Age group	Male	Female	Total	Per cent
0–14	7 795	7 638	15 433	14.94
15–64	34 677	34 421	69 098	66.91
65+	8 531	10 205	18 736	18.14

In 2011, there were 64,353 people of working age (16 to 64 for men, and 16 to 59 for women; 66% of the population). The dependency ratio for Jersey was 52% (similar to 2011); the dependency ratio is around the same value as that in 1931, however was higher (60%) in 1971, and lower (47%) in 1991.

=== Place of birth ===
Half of the population of Jersey was born on the island, with the majority of the remainder from elsewhere in the British Islands. 7% of the population was born in Portugal, conspicuously from Madeira Autonomous Region, a sister province, the largest overseas place of birth. In 1981, only 3% of the population was born in Portugal and 5% elsewhere.

Jersey population by place of birth (2011)
Place of birth	Number	Per cent
Jersey	48,654	50
British Isles^{a}	30,223	31
Portugal	7,031	7
Poland	3,133	3
Ireland	1,880	2
Other European country	3,146	3
Elsewhere in the world	3,791	4

Of the category 'Other European country', the primary countries were France and Romania and for 'Elsewhere in the world', the primary countries were South Africa and India.

== Statistics ==
The following demographic statistics are from the CIA World Factbook, unless otherwise indicated.

=== Birth rate ===
11.0 births/1,000 population (2005)

=== Death rate ===
8.5 deaths/1,000 population (2005)

=== Net immigration rate ===
2.81 migrant(s)/1,000 population (2000 est.)

=== Sex ratio ===
At birth:	1.11 male(s)/female
under 15 years:	1.08 male(s)/female
15–64 years:	0.99 male(s)/female
65 years and over:	0.74 male(s)/female
total population:	0.96 male(s)/female (2000 est.)

=== Infant mortality ===
4 deaths/1,000 live births (2005)

=== Life expectancy at birth ===
total population: 78.48 years
male: 76.07 years
female: 81.07 years (2000 est.)

=== Average age at death ===
- Men 72
- Women 79

=== Total fertility rate ===
1.56 children born/woman (2000 est.) 1.32 children born/woman (2023)

=== Nationality ===
noun: Jerseyman, Jerseywoman, Jèrriais, Jèrriaise
adjective: Jersey

=== Ethnic groups ===
Indigenous Jersey-Normans and those of British and French descent. Portuguese, Polish, Irish and Romanian minorities.

=== Religions ===
Anglican, Roman Catholic, Baptist, Methodist and Presbyterian.

=== Languages ===
See Languages of Jersey

English (official), French (official), Jèrriais (official: though only spoken by a few native elderly in rural areas, used as a first language by around 1,900 people). Portuguese commonly spoken by migrant workers and is sometimes found in written form, e.g. government informational signs.

=== Literacy ===
82% of children in state schools achieve their reading targets – the UK average is 90%. This leads to some cases of illiteracy in Jersey.

== See also ==
- List of people from Jersey
