= Alternative names for Northern Ireland =

There are a number of alternative names for Northern Ireland. Northern Ireland consists of six historic counties of Ireland, and remains part of the United Kingdom following the independence of the other twenty-six counties as the Irish Free State in 1922 (now the Republic of Ireland, officially named "Ireland"). In addition to, and sometimes instead of, its official name, several other names are used for the region. Significant differences in political views between unionists and Irish nationalists are reflected in the variations of names they use for the region. A proposal to change Northern Ireland's legal name to Ulster was seriously considered by the UK and Northern Ireland governments in 1949 but in the end, the name "Northern Ireland" was retained.

== Names ==
=== Legal name ===
The official and legal name of the region is Northern Ireland. The legal name is used by both the British and Irish governments, internationally by governments around the world, and by most of its inhabitants.

=== Political names ===
==== Unionist-associated names ====
Ulster is often used by unionists and some media outlets in the UK. This is the Hiberno-Norse form of the province of Uladh (Irish Uladh and Old Norse ster, meaning "province", yields "Uladh Ster" or, in English, "Ulster"). Examples of official use of this term are the Ulster Unionist Party, the University of Ulster, and the BBC Radio Ulster.

This term is disliked by some nationalists because the whole of the Province of Ulster consists of nine counties – three of which, County Monaghan, County Cavan and County Donegal, are in the Republic of Ireland. Unionists have argued that because Ulster's size has changed much over the centuries, Ulster can be applied to Northern Ireland alone. The Government of Northern Ireland once considered a proposal to change the official name to Ulster. Some also reject the claim of the Republic of Ireland to have inherited the tradition of the Irish Republic of the Irish War of Independence, because it excludes the north east, and refer to the Republic variously as the Free State or The Twenty-Six Counties.

The Province is also sometimes used, referring directly to the status of Northern Ireland as a "province" of the United Kingdom. This also, however, could be obliquely used to refer to the province of Ulster; and since no other constituent part of the United Kingdom is known as a province, a less controversial usage is "the region".

In 1949, members of the United Kingdom Parliament debated how best it was to respond to Ireland's decision to terminate its last connection with the British monarch. Ireland also adopted a law saying that the state could be described as the Republic of Ireland. Some British MPs did not consider this was appropriate. Lieut-Colonel Sir Thomas Moore MP said that "Ulster has as much right to be called the "Kingdom of Ireland" as Southern Ireland has to be called the "Republic of Ireland." However, Northern Ireland was never renamed the Kingdom of Ireland.

==== Nationalist-associated names ====
Nationalists in the region and their supporters elsewhere commonly refer to it as The North of Ireland, The North-East or The North. This can be used to implicitly deny British sovereignty by placing it into the rest of Ireland, at least linguistically. It does, however, contain the same geographic anomaly as it does not contain Ireland's most northerly point.

The Six Counties is another popular name among republicans, as it can portray the region as a mere collection of Irish counties, rather than a legal political entity.

The Occupied Territories or The Occupied Six Counties are phrases sometimes used by some republicans, especially since the arrival of additional British Army soldiers, but originally employed simply to suggest the illegitimacy of the British presence in Northern Ireland. This is sometimes rendered as The Occupied Zone or The OZ.

=== Other names ===
In the Republic of Ireland, people typically refer to the region simply as the North. Similarly, and more commonly, in Northern Ireland, the South is sometimes used (by both unionists and nationalists) as a shorthand term for the Republic of Ireland.

Obviously, this explanation does not hold for parts of the Republic such as County Donegal giving rise to the joke that while further out in a boat on Lough Foyle, "the South is north, and the North is south".

A colloquial name for Northern Ireland which has grown in popularity in recent years is "Norn Iron", derived from an exaggerated pronunciation of 'Northern Ireland' in a broad Belfast accent. This name is often used by fans of the football team both on banners and in conversation.

Northern Ireland is literally translated to Tuaisceart Éireann in Irish (though it is sometimes known as Na Sé Chontae 'The Six Counties' as well as Tuaisceart na hÉireann '[the] North of Ireland' by republicans) and Norlin Airlann or Northern Ireland in Ulster Scots.

== Government proposals to rename Northern Ireland as Ulster ==
Ulster unionists often use the name Ulster as a synonym for Northern Ireland. Sometimes there are calls to formally change the name of Northern Ireland to Ulster.

=== 1937 Ulster proposal ===
In 1937 a plebiscite was held in the Irish Free State which approved a new Constitution. Among its provisions, the name of the Irish state was changed to "Ireland"; this led to discussions, both at a governmental level and in the House of Commons of Northern Ireland, about Northern Ireland being renamed as Ulster.

==== UK and NI government discussions about name change ====
Ahead of the renaming of the Irish Free State to simply Ireland in 1937, the British Prime Minister and the Home Secretary discussed the matter with the Prime Minister of Northern Ireland, Lord Craigavon when he was in London in July 1937. It was reported to the Cabinet that:

So far as Mr. de Valera's proposed new title for the State is concerned, Lord Craigavon seemed indisposed to react violently to it, but suggested that retaliatory legislation might be introduced in the Northern Ireland Parliament changing the official title of Northern Ireland to "Ulster." But he added that if this would require legislation in the United Kingdom Parliament as well, he was opposed to that action.

Later, the British Home Secretary discussed the new name for the Irish state (and other matters) with the acting Prime Minister of Northern Ireland, J. M. Andrews on 10 December 1937 just under three weeks before the new constitution came into effect. Since the earlier discussions with Lord Craigavon, the Law Officers have given their opinion that local legislation changing the name of Northern Ireland to Ulster would be ultra vires, and that legislation by Westminster would be necessary if the change of name were to be made. It was this which the Home Secretary wished to discuss with Mr. Andrews. The Home Secretary reported on the discussions to his Cabinet colleagues noting the following:

When I put to Mr. Andrews the possible alternative and pointed out the obvious disadvantages that would be involved in Imperial legislation, he told me, with the authority of Lord Craigavon, that they no longer wished to press for the change of name. If, however, there was to be no change of name, two conditions seemed to them to be essential if the position of the United Kingdom in general, and Northern Ireland in particular, was to be safeguarded. In the first place it was necessary that a most categorical statement should be made by the Prime Minister of the United Kingdom, making clear our attitude towards Mr. De Valera's assumption of the title of "Ireland" and stating in the simplest and firmest terms that on no account would we be prepared to accept interference with the jurisdiction of the Government of Northern Ireland without the express approval of Northern Ireland itself... Secondly, it was essential that nothing affecting the position of Northern Ireland should be done in any negotiations with Mr. De Valera without some opportunity for Lord Craigavon and Mr. Andrews to make their case.

==== Parliamentary discussions about name change ====
The parliamentary reports of the Parliament of Northern Ireland record an instance in 1937 where the proposal to rename Northern Ireland as Ulster was given formal consideration. On 1 December 1937, Thomas Joseph Campbell, MP (Nationalist) asked the Prime Minister of Northern Ireland whether the Government was considering changing the name of Northern Ireland, and, if so what name was being considered. Responding, the Minister of Finance J. M. Andrews MP said "the matter has been under discussion amongst Members of the Government, but no Cabinet decision has been taken".

This exchange followed speeches in parliament the previous month by two Independent Unionist MPs, Tommy Henderson and John William Nixon, raising the possible name change. Both regretted the name change was not mentioned in the King's Speech. Mr. Henderson criticised the Attorney General for Northern Ireland's handling of the matter. He said that "the Attorney-General suggested recently that the name of Northern Ireland should be changed to Ulster". However, according to Mr Henderson, it was "absolutely impossible to change the name of this area from Northern Ireland to Ulster without amending the 1920 Act" (the Government of Ireland Act 1920). That Act could only be amended by the Parliament of the United Kingdom and not the Parliament or government of Northern Ireland. He concluded that in making the suggestion, the Attorney-General had tried to "throw dust in the eyes of the Ulster people".

This exchange had followed a statement made by the Attorney General, Sir Anthony Babbington KC on 15 November 1937 in Belfast in which he criticised the new Constitution proposed for Ireland. In particular, he was critical of its claim to jurisdiction over Northern Ireland. He said:

I think that something should be done to make it quite clear that under no circumstances whatsoever could any such jurisdiction ever be exercised over us. I do not know how it is to be done but I shall make one suggestion and it is this: 'Our title has always been Northern Ireland. It was so under the Government of Ireland Act 1920, under which our Government was set up; and my suggestion is that it should be changed by law from 'Northern Ireland' to 'Ulster'.

The Attorney General continued by saying that it was of "great importance" that the "cumbersome name" of Northern Ireland that came into the Act of 1920 alongside Southern Ireland should be changed. He continued further remarking that "The name of Southern Ireland has been changed and it was time that the name of Northern Ireland should be changed to Ulster".

=== 1949 Ulster proposal ===
At a British Cabinet meeting on 22 November 1948 it was decided that a Working Party be established to "[consider] what consequential action may have to be taken by the United Kingdom Government as a result of Eire's ceasing to be a member of the Commonwealth". At the time the Irish parliament was soon expected to pass the Republic of Ireland Act, by which Ireland (formally referred to as "Eire" by the British authorities) would shortly become a republic, and thereby leave the Commonwealth.

The Working Party was chaired by the Cabinet Secretary, Norman Brook. Its report dated 1 January 1949 was presented by Prime Minister Clement Attlee to the Cabinet on 7 January 1949. Among its recommendations was that the name of Northern Ireland should be changed to Ulster. In this regard, the Working Party's report noted:

The Government of Northern Ireland have formally asked that the title of Northern Ireland should now be changed to "Ulster"...As a name "Ulster" is clearly to be preferred to "Northern Ireland." "The United Kingdom of Great Britain and Ulster" is a rounder and more resounding title than "the United Kingdom of Great Britain and Northern Ireland." ...The majority of the working party conclude that the balance of advantage lies on the side of adopting the title "Ulster" for the six counties. We all agree, however, that the arguments against making this change should be put to the Prime Minister of Northern Ireland before a final decision is taken by Ministers.

The Working Party's report appended draft legislation (a draft of the Ireland Act) including provision for the "Ulster" name change. With respect to the arguments against the name change, the report noted in particular that the UK's "Representative" (effectively Ambassador) in Dublin believed taking the name "Ulster" would "give fresh opportunities for anti-British propaganda by Eire". The report also noted that the Commonwealth Relations Office also held that view and its representative on the working party had asked that before a final decision be taken:

the Prime Minister of Northern Ireland should be made aware of the view held by the United Kingdom Representative in Dublin and should, in particular, be asked whether he thinks it tactically wise that the North (i) should abandon any reference to the word "Ireland" in their title and (ii) should abandon the title "Northern Ireland," with which their record in the last war is so closely associated, especially in the United States.

A Downing Street Conference between the UK and Northern Ireland governments was held on 6 January 1949. The Conference was held on the initiative of the Northern Ireland Government. Its purpose was to consider possible legislation to give statutory effect to Prime Minister Clement Attlee's assurance that Northern Ireland's constitutional position would not be prejudiced by the Republic of Ireland Act by which Ireland had decided to leave the British Commonwealth and any other possible consequences for Northern Ireland arising from the Irish decision. The UK government was represented at the Conference by the Prime Minister, the Lord Chancellor, the Home Secretary, and the Secretary of State for Commonwealth Relations while Northern Ireland premier Sir Basil Brooke led the Northern Ireland delegation. Brooke said to Attlee:

If Eire was now to take the title ‘Republic of Ireland’, the North could not conveniently continue to be known as ‘Northern Ireland’ for this would imply that the North was or ought to be part of the new republic.

Prime Minister Attlee reported to his Cabinet colleagues the following day that he had discussed relevant Working Party proposals with the Northern Ireland delegation. "As a result of that discussion", Attlee reported that he would "recommend that the title of Northern Ireland should not be changed to Ulster".

On 10 January 1949, Prime Minister Attlee presented a memorandum of his own to his Cabinet. With respect to his recommendation that the name for Northern Ireland should not be changed, he said:

The consideration which weighed most with me and with the other Ministers whom I consulted was that the proposed use of the title "Ulster" was likely to provoke acute controversy among Irishmen in other Commonwealth countries. This in itself would be unfortunate: but, even worse, it would aggravate the difficulties of securing the agreement of other Commonwealth Governments to the necessary change in The King's title. In discussion with the Northern Ireland Ministers we found that they were not disposed to press very strongly for the adoption of the title "Ulster." Their main anxiety was that the United Kingdom Government should not formally admit the Eire Government's claim to the title "Ireland" and thereby prejudice the Partition issue. They would have preferred that we should continue to use "Eire" as a formal description of the twenty-six counties. We convinced them that, as by international usage; a country is free to determine its own title, it would be fruitless for us to try to secure international acceptance of the term "Eire" as a title for the South, and that we had no practical alternative but to recognise the new title taken in the Republic of Ireland Act. At the same time, we explained that we should make it clear in our legislation that the term "Republic of Ireland " applied only to the territory which had hitherto been known as Eire (i.e., the twenty-six counties); and that we should be careful in all official usage to refer to the South as "the Republic of Ireland " or " the Irish Republic" reserving "Ireland" as a geographical description of the island as a whole. In colloquial usage it would no doubt be possible to mark the distinction by speaking of "Southern Ireland" and "Northern Ireland." We added that we should also be prepared to recommend a change in The King's title by which "Northern Ireland" would be substituted for " Ireland." This last point made a great appeal to the Northern Ireland Ministers; and on this basis they were content that we should formally recognise the title "Republic of Ireland" as a description of the twenty-six counties and should continue to use "Northern Ireland" as a description of the North. I commend this solution to the Cabinet.

The proposed name change was the subject of some reportage in the media with The Times reporting shortly before the conference:

CHANGE OF NAME In addition to the question whether statutory effect should be given to the verbal assurance of Mr. Attlee that Northern Ireland's constitutional position will be in no way prejudiced by the Republic of Ireland Act, the Northern Ireland Ministers are expected to raise the subject of a possible change in the name of their part of the United Kingdom. There have been many suggestions that to differentiate it more clearly from the Republic of Ireland - as Eire will be styled in future - Northern Ireland should be renamed 'Ulster'.

The fresh proposal to change the name to Ulster drew protest from the Nationalist Party MP for Fermanagh and Tyrone, Anthony Mulvey. He sent a telegram to Attlee to strongly "protest against any proposal to change the title Northern Ireland to Ulster". Mulvey argued that "[a]ny assent to the suggestion proposed can only be regarded as a calculated affront to the Irish nation and still further embitter relations between the peoples of Great Britain and Ireland...". Mulvey sent a telegram in similar terms to the Irish Minister for External Affairs, Seán MacBride who responded as follows:.

You may rest assured that nothing will be done by the Irish Government which would lend sanction to any such proposal.

The UK government cabinet minutes of 12 January 1949 noted that "N.I. [Northern Ireland] Ministers accepted the name “N.I.” eventually" A few days after the Conference The Times also reported that "[i]t is not thought that the suggestion to rename Northern Ireland "Ulster" has found much support." In a somewhat colourful but not too accurate explanation of events, in the run up to the General Election in Northern Ireland in 1949, Thomas Loftus Cole declared that the British Government had refused to allow the name change "because the area did not comprise the nine counties of the province. We should demand our three counties [Donegal, Monaghan and Cavan] so that we could call our country Ulster, a name of which we are all proud".

== See also ==
- Derry/Londonderry name dispute
- Geographical renaming
- Names of the Irish state
- Southern Ireland
- Terminology of the British Isles
