= Languages of Jersey =

- Official: English (Majority), Jersey Legal French Jèrriais
- Vernacular: Channel Island English
- Minority: Jèrriais (Norman language)
- Immigrant: Portuguese
- Signed: British Sign Language
- Keyboard layout: British QWERTY

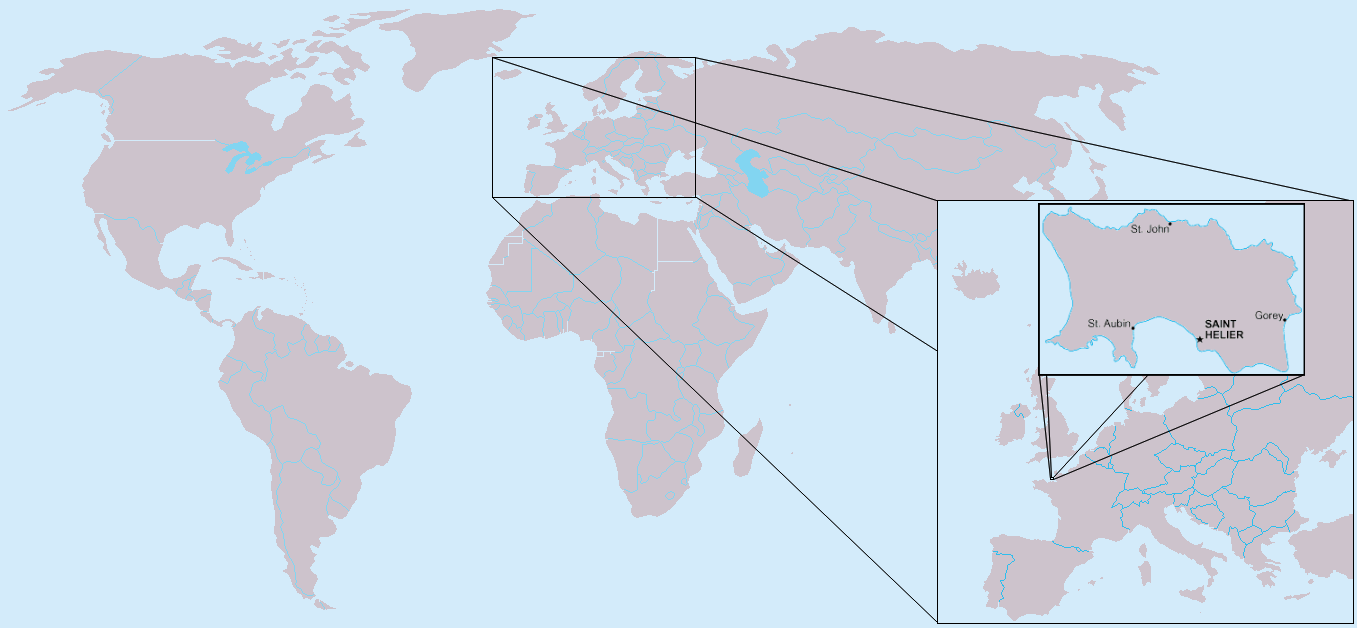
The island of Jersey, in close proximity to the Norman coast of France.

The Bailiwick of Jersey, a crown dependency in the Channel Islands, off the French coast of Normandy, has three official languages: English, French and Jèrriais. Traditionally, Jèrriais, a variety of the ancient Norman language, has been the dominant language of the Bailiwick, but the past century has seen a great decline in its usage, as well as in the use of French.

== Statistics ==
Languages spoken as of 2001
Language	Main language	Secondary language	Total speakers
English	82,350	3,443	85,792
Portuguese	4,002	3,300	7,305
French	338	14,776	15,114
Jèrriais (Jersey French)	113	2,761	2,874
Other	384	4,496	4,880

== English ==
As a crown dependency of the British monarch, English has a special place in the island, and is now the dominant, as well as an official, language.

The English language has been allowed in parliamentary debates in the States of Jersey since February 2, 1900.

Most signs are written in English, sometimes with French or Jèrriais subtitling. There are around 107,000 people in Jersey, and 20% are of British (traditionally English-speaking) descent. Most of the Norman-descended population now speaks English as well. All demographics combined, English is spoken by 94.6% of the population.

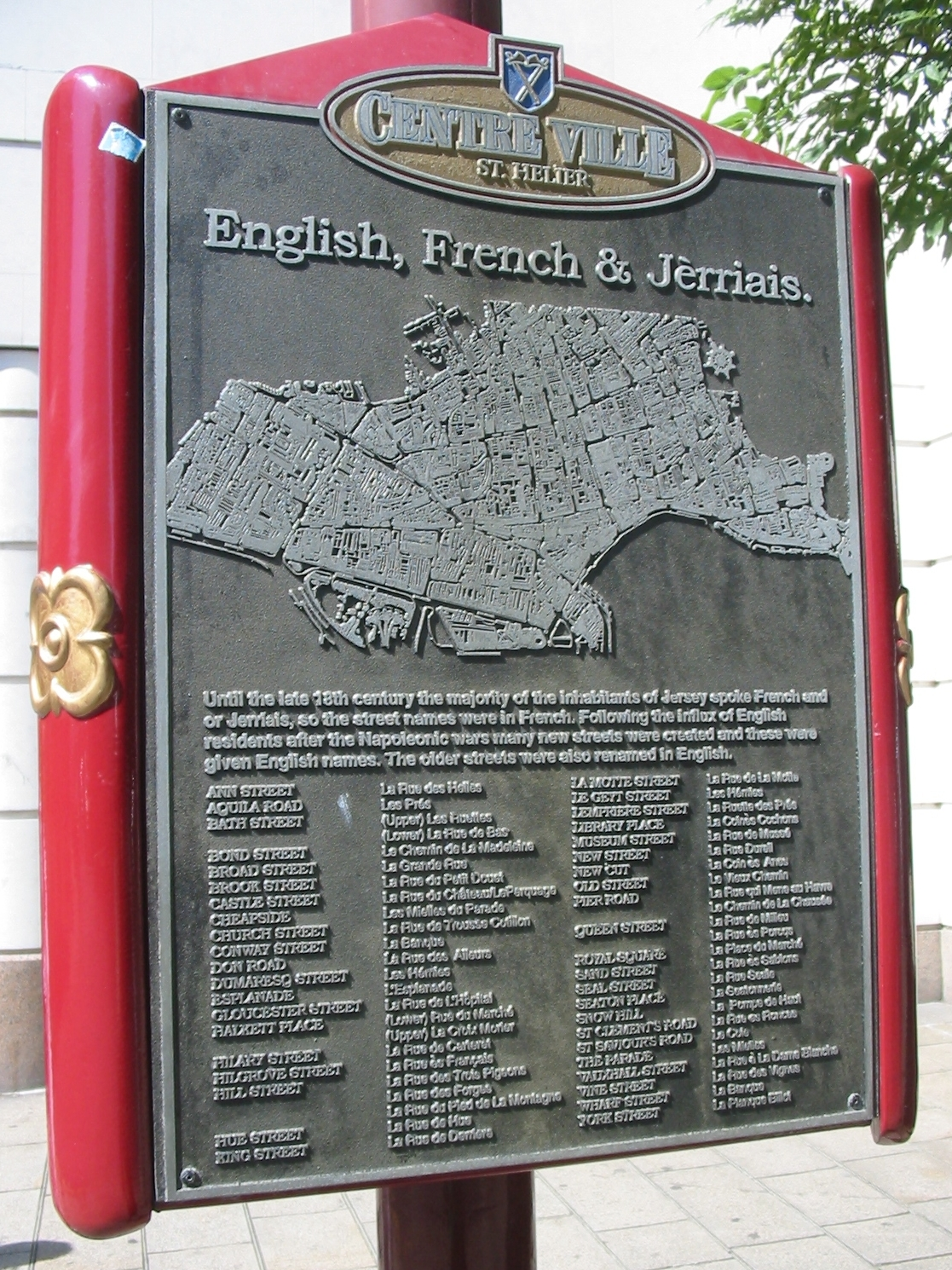
Sign explaining street names of Saint Helier in English, French and Jèrriais

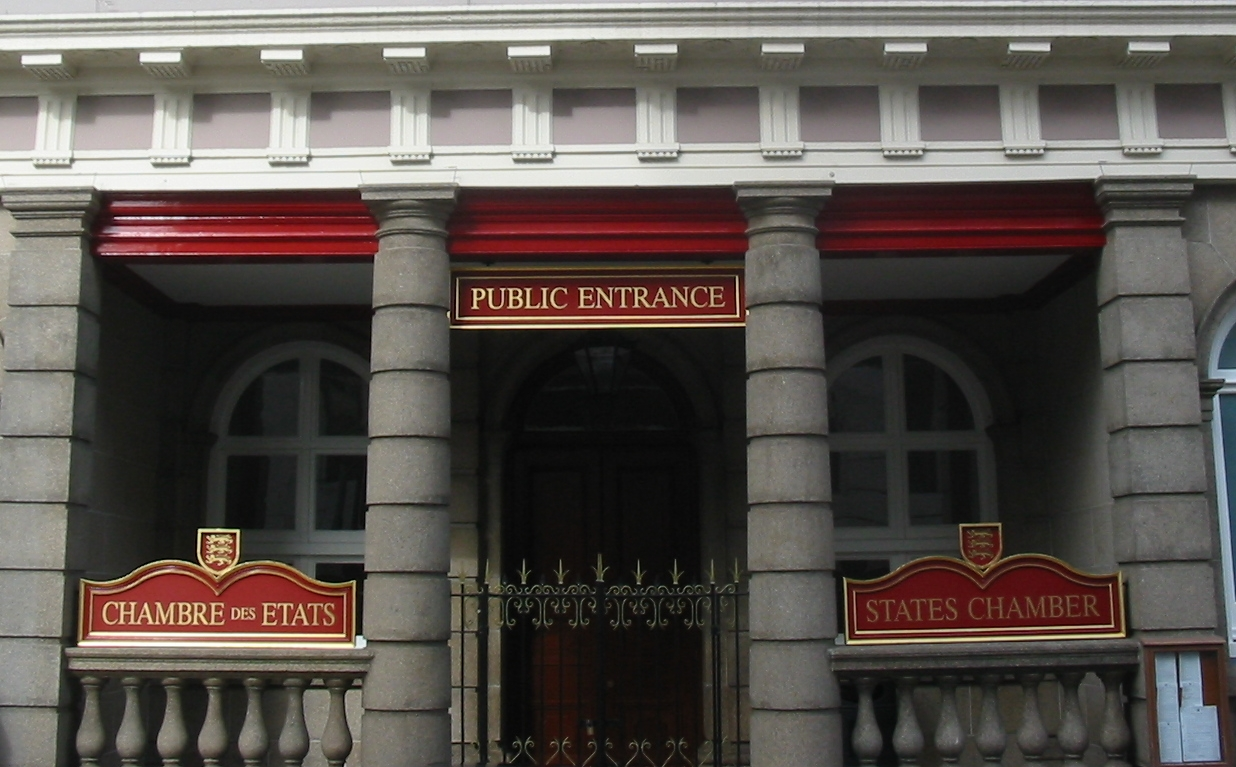
Public entrance to States Chamber in St. Helier, Jersey, showing bilingual signage in French and English

== French ==
Jersey Legal French is the official variety of French used in administration. The States of Jersey is part of the Assemblée parlementaire de la Francophonie. The current use of French in the parliament is generally restricted to formalities (prayers, ceremonies, formulae).

Due to proximity, there has been a French-speaking community in Jersey for centuries, though now it has shrunk considerably, although the language is still official. The former national anthem, "Ma Normandie", was in French. At various points in history the indigenous French-speaking population of Jersey was supplemented by political refugees from France, including for example Victor Hugo.

The last French-language newspaper in Jersey, Les Chroniques de Jersey, closed at the end of 1959.

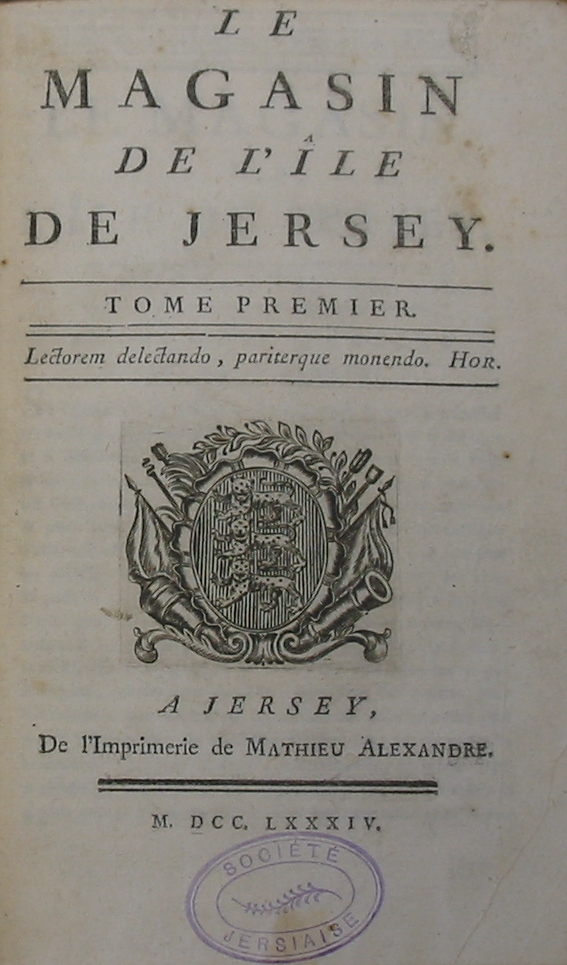
First newspaper published in Jersey, 1784

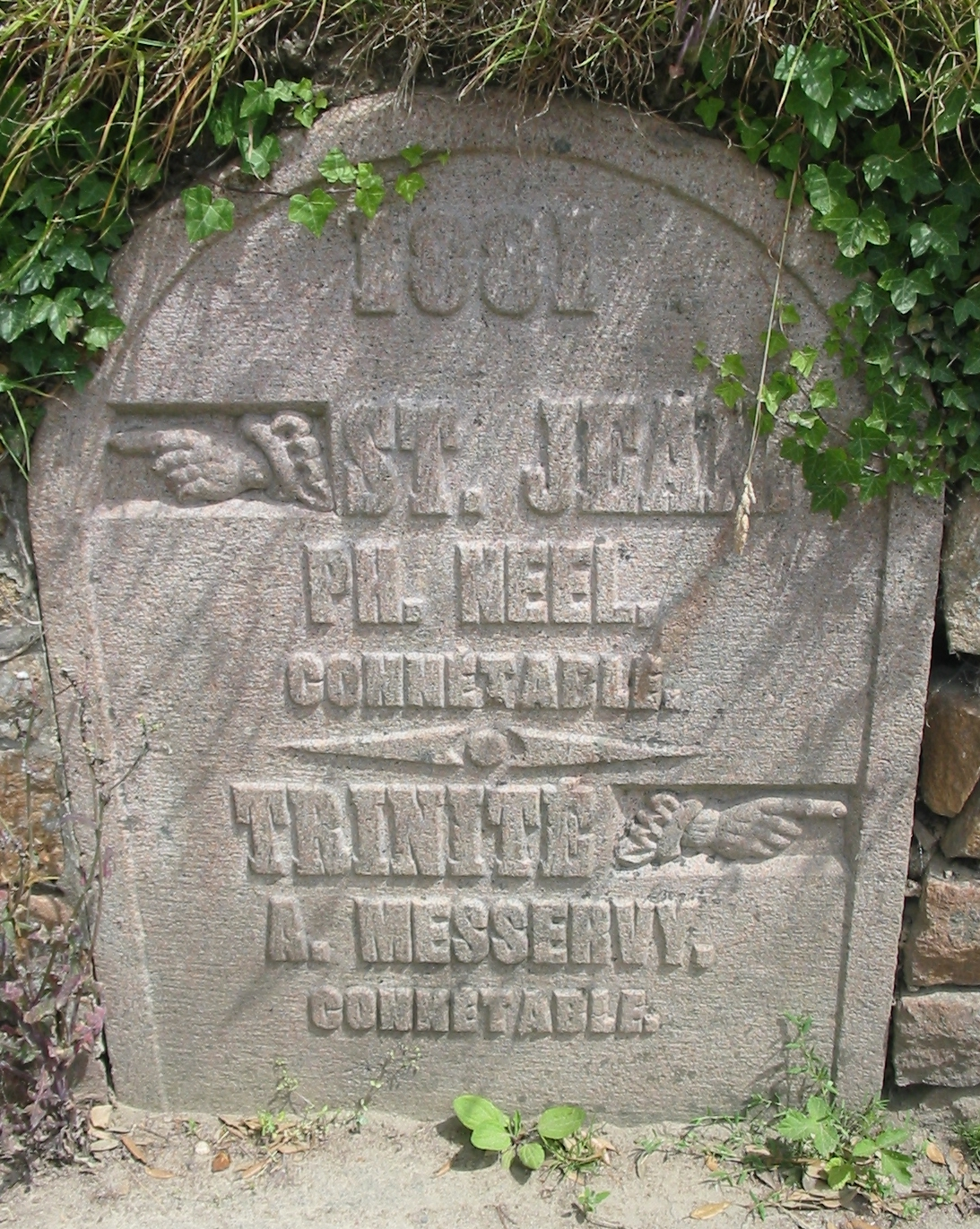
1881 boundary stone in French

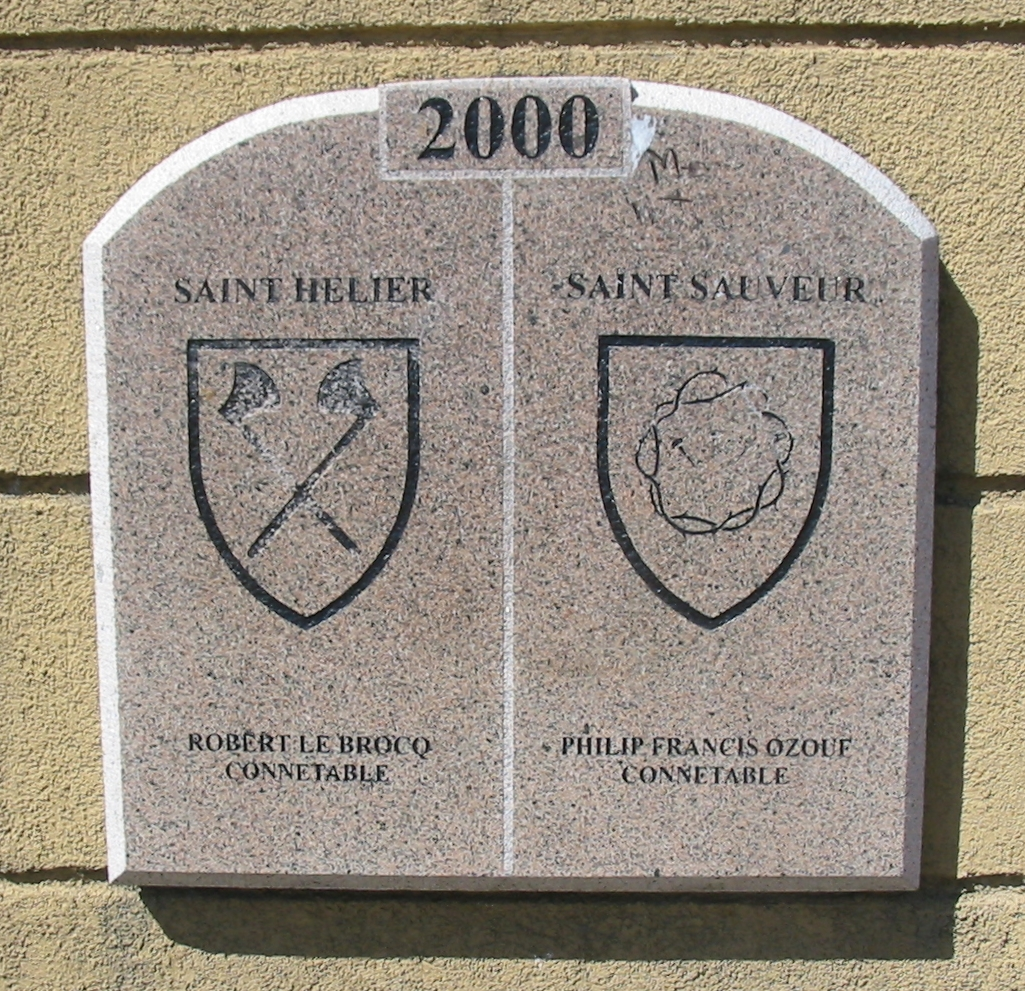
2000 boundary stone in French

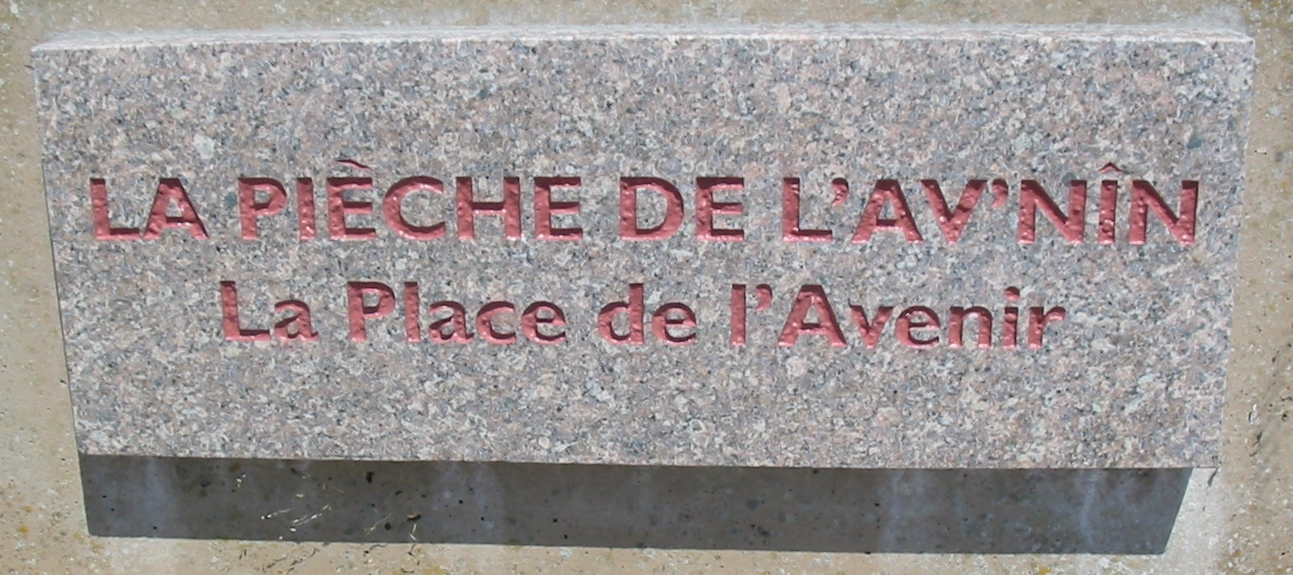
Bilingual sign in Jèrriais and French

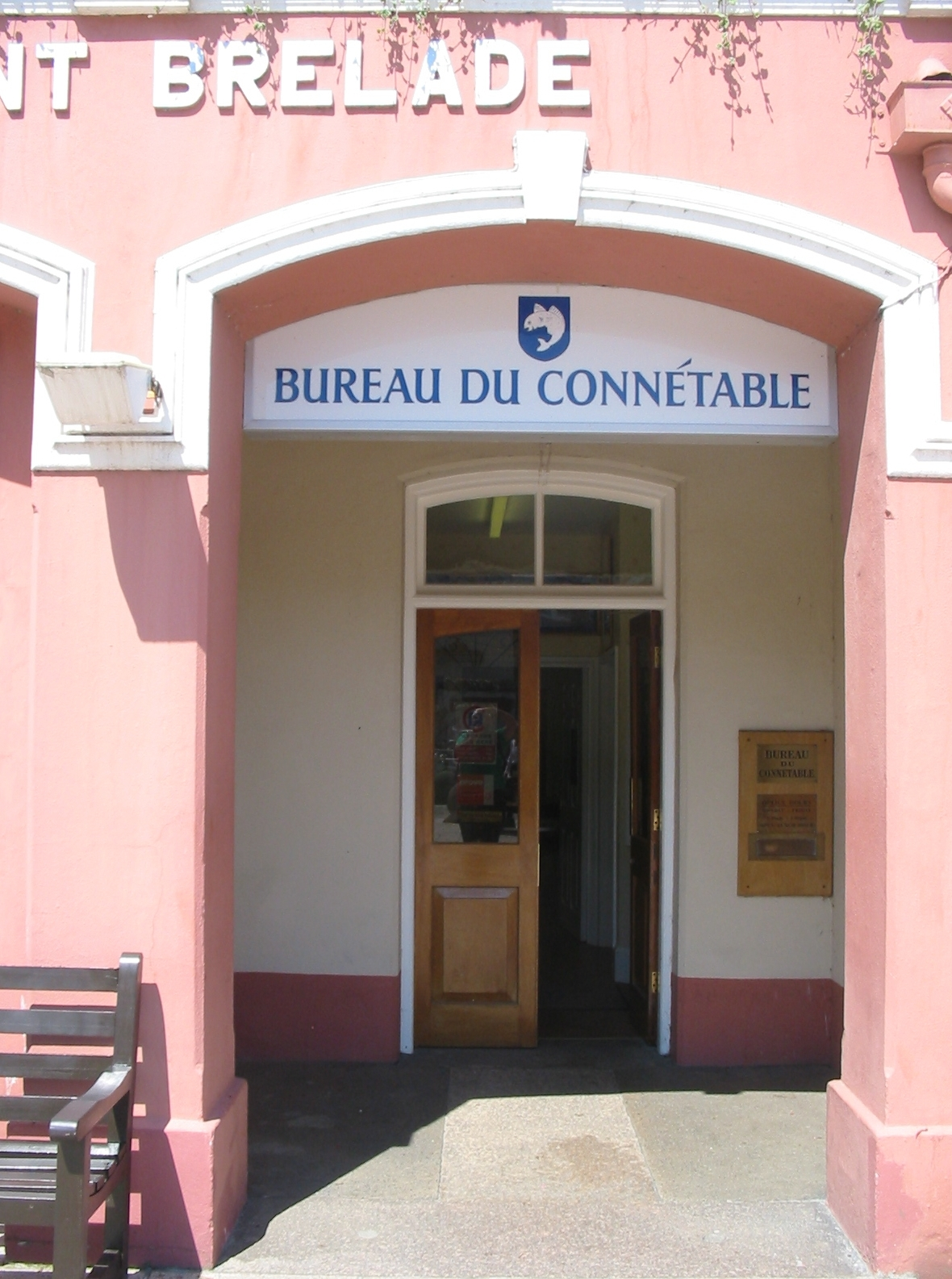
Constable's Office

== Jèrriais ==
Jèrriais, sometimes referred to as "Jersey French" or "Jersey Norman French", a variety of Norman, was the dominant language of the Bailiwick for most of its history. Now, however, the language is spoken by around 2,600 of the 87,000 inhabitants of the island, down from 5,720 in 1989. The language is most prominent in rural areas, where the proportions of speakers are highest, although the capital, Saint Helier, has the highest total number of speakers. Around 200 children are learning the language in schools as of 2006, and the Jersey Evening Post, the island's main newspaper, runs articles in Jèrriais every week. Up to 15% of the island has some understanding of the language.

Sercquiais, a descendant of Jèrriais spoken by settlers from Jersey in Sark, is also near the brink of extinction, with fewer than 20 native speakers.

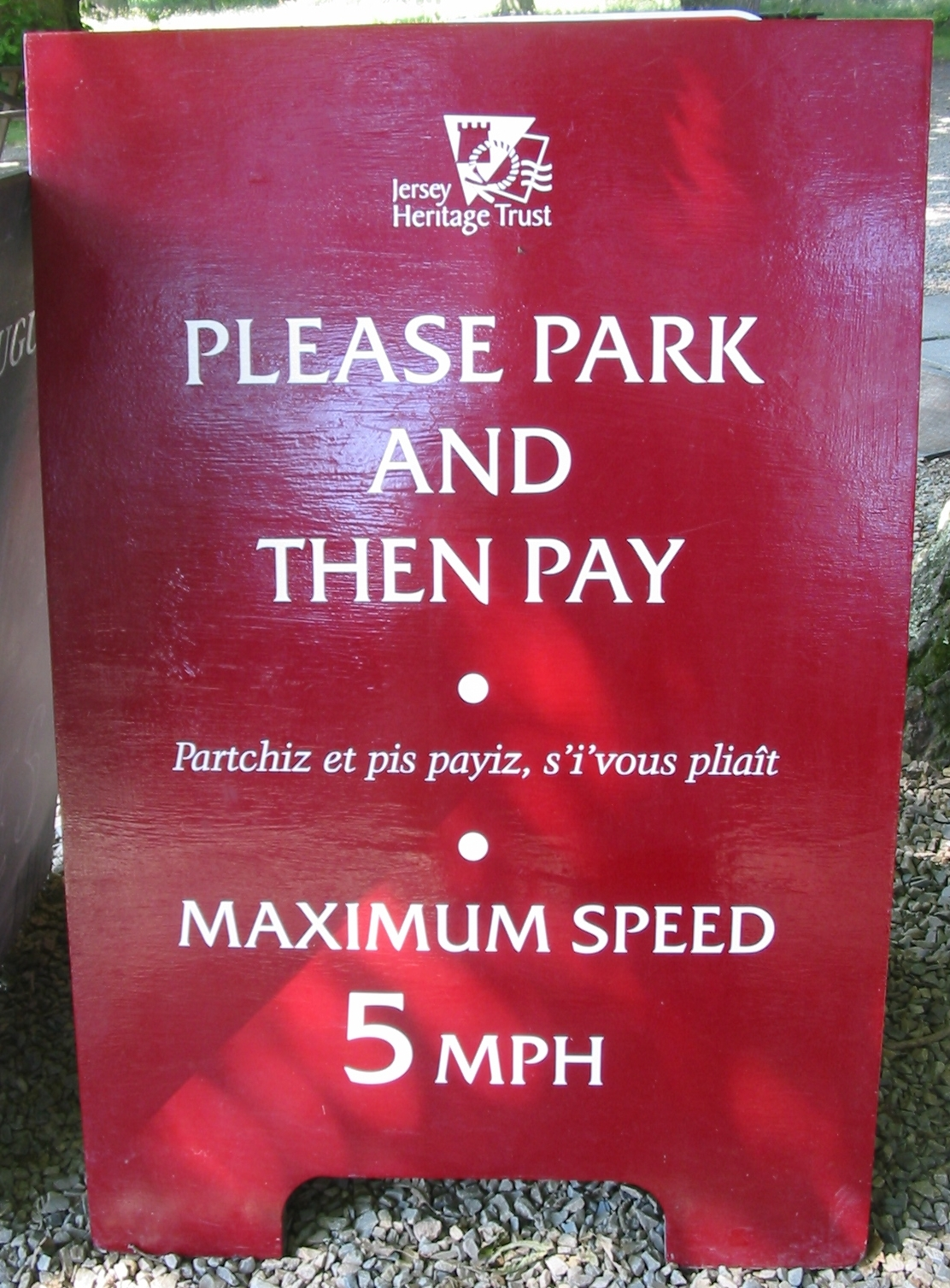
Bilingual signage, with English displayed more prominently than Jèrriais

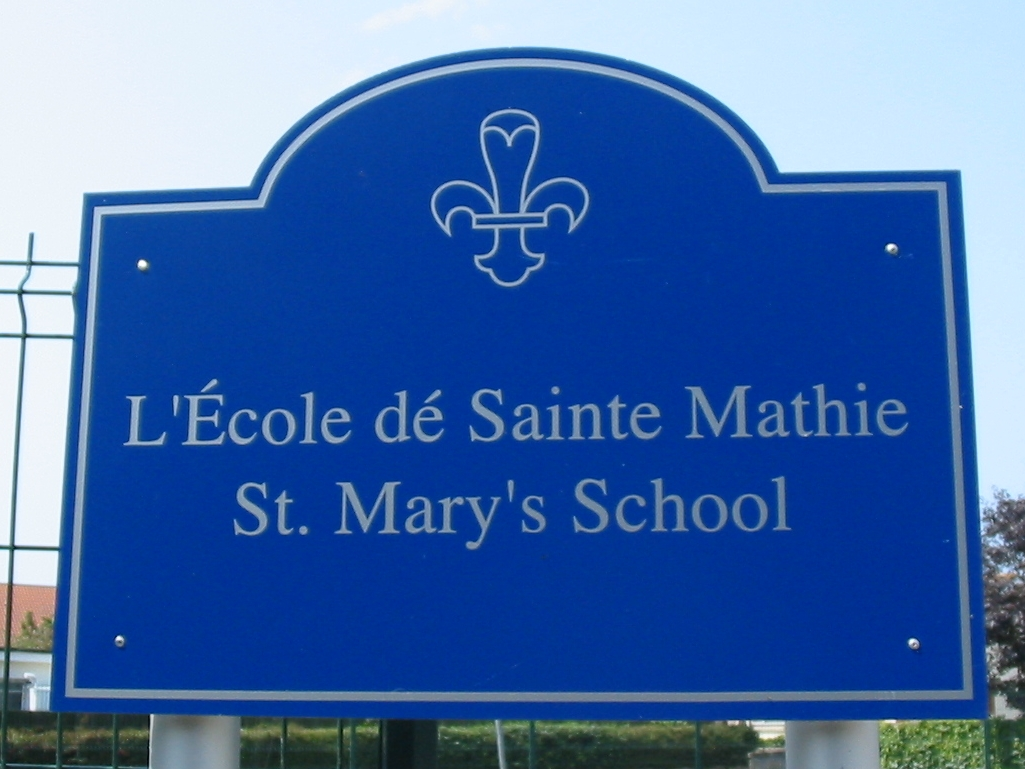
Bilingual school sign

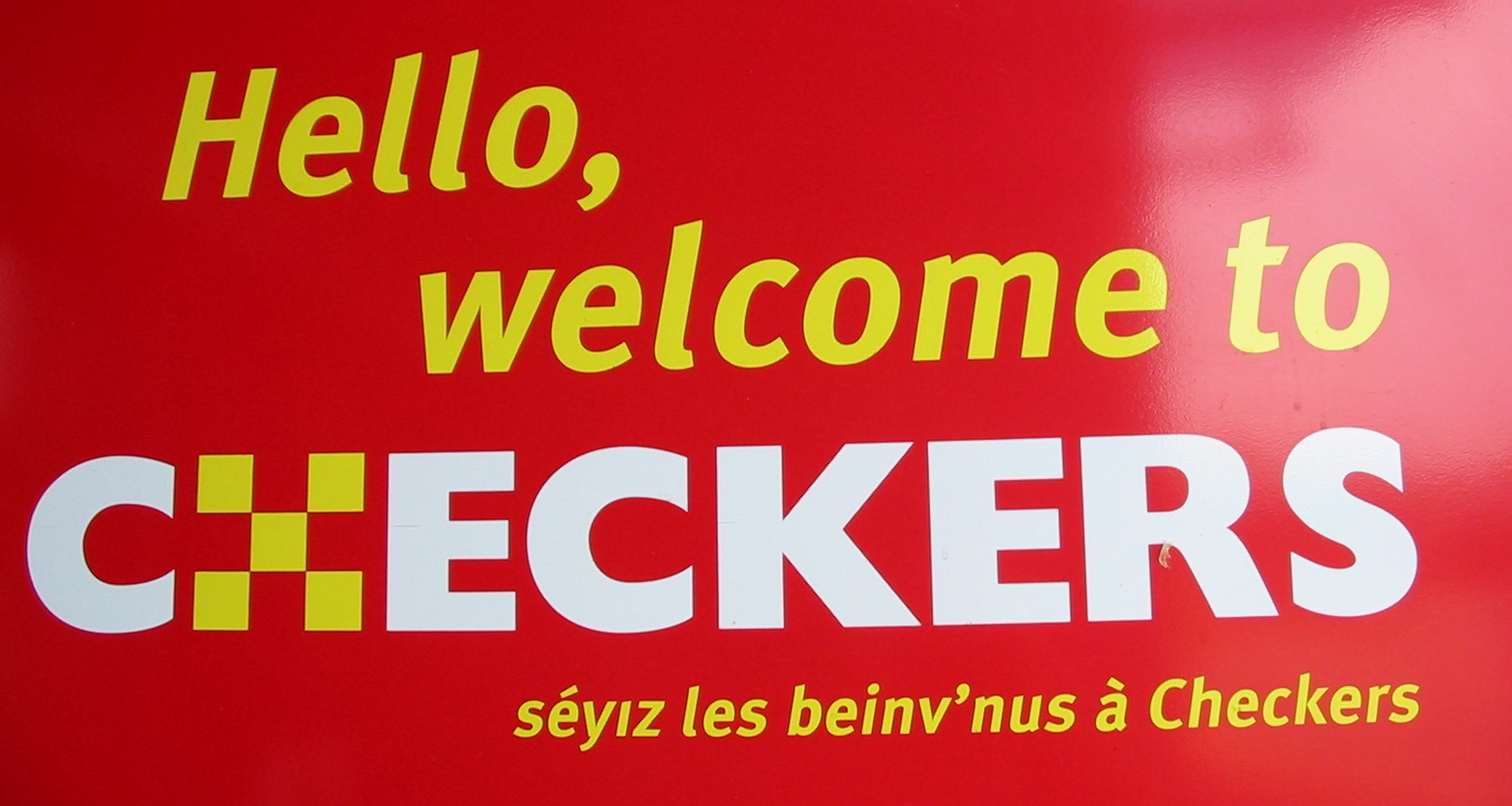
Bilingual supermarket sign

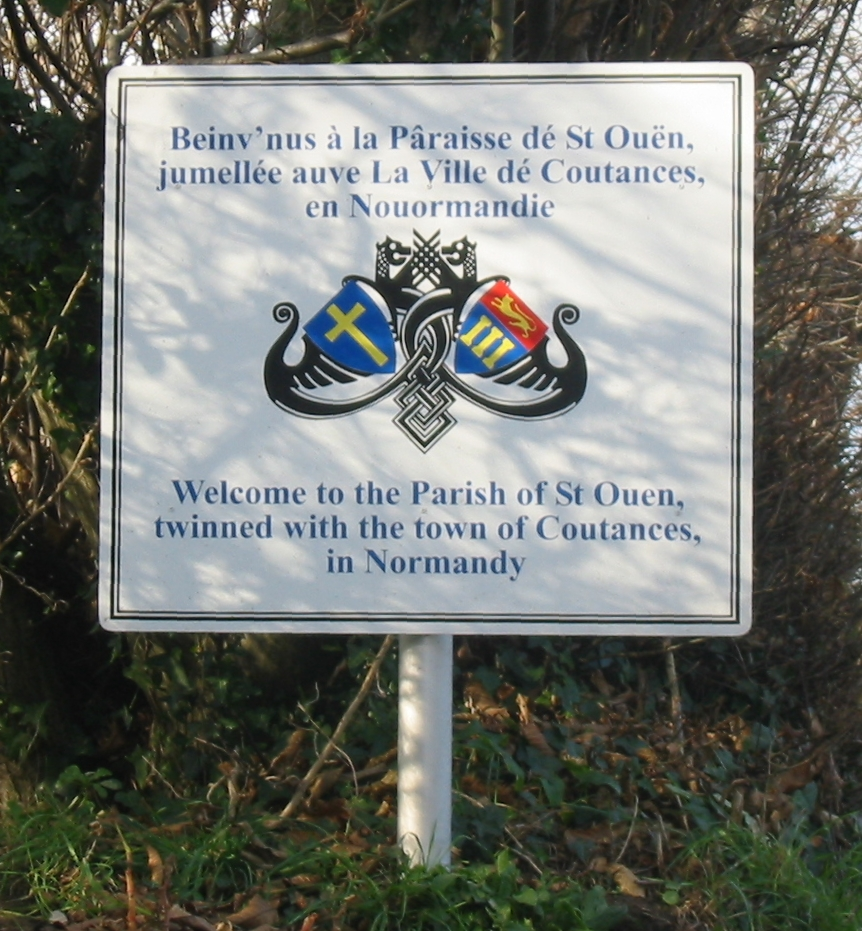
A Bilingual welcome sign on which English and Jèrriais are given equal prominence

== Portuguese ==
Immigrants of Portuguese (mostly Madeiran) ethnicity make up 9.4% of Jersey. The Portuguese language was spoken by 8.4% of the total population as a first or second language in 2011, and is commonly used in signage, notices, and the like.

== British Sign ==
The Deaf community on Jersey use British Sign Language.

== See also ==
- Jèrriais literature
