= List of members of the judiciary of Jersey =

== Court of Appeal of Jersey ==
Members of the Court of Appeal are appointed under the Court of Appeal (Jersey) Law 1961. The Court of Appeal sits for seven to eight weeks during the year.

=== Current members of the Court of Appeal of Jersey ===
Name	Year appointed	Other judicial roles	Professional background
Sir Michael Birt		formerly partner in Ogier & Le Cornu	
Sir William Bailhache Bailiff of Jersey 2015 - , ex officio President of the Court of Appeal)	Deputy Bailiff of Jersey 2009 - 2015	formerly partner in Bailhache Labesse (law firm) 1976 - 2000	
Hon Michael Beloff KC	1995	deputy High Court judge, England and Wales	barrister at Blackstone Chambers, London, specialising in human rights, administrative and sports law
Sir John Nutting KC	1995	deputy High Court judge, England and Wales	First Senior Treasury Counsel
James McNeill KC	1996	-	Scottish advocate specialising in commercial and trusts law
Michael Jones KC	2005	part-time chairman of the Police Appeals Tribunal	formerly a barrister in England and advocate in Scotland, specialising in aviation, media law and product liability; now a partner in the Scottish law firm Simpson & Marwick
John Martin KC	2007	deputy High Court judge in England and Wales since 1993	barrister at Wilberforce Chambers, London, specialising in chancery and commercial matters
Clare Montgomery KC	2007	deputy High Court judge in England and Wales since 2003	barrister at Matrix Chambers, London, specialising in criminal, regulatory and fraud law
Nigel Pleming KC	2007	deputy High Court judge in England and Wales since 1998	barrister at 39 Essex Street, London specialising in administrative and public law, human rights and civil liberties, immigration and tax law
Sir Hugh Bennett	2010	High Court judge in England and Wales (Family Division) 1995-2002	-
Christopher Nugee KC	2011	deputy High Court judge in England and Wales (Chancery Division) since 2003	barrister at Wilberforce Chambers, London, specialising in commercial law
Jonathan Crow KC	2011	deputy High Court judge in England and Wales since 2001	barrister at 4 Stone Buildings, London, specialising in commercial litigation and international trust work
Richard Collas	2012	Bailiff of Guernsey; ex officio President of the Guernsey Court of Appeal	Deputy Bailiff of Guernsey 2005–12; partner in law firm Collas Day until 2005
Helen Mountfield KC	2019	Deputy High Court Judge in the Administrative Court and as a civil and criminal recorder.	Barrister at Matrix Chambers, London, specialising in Administrative & Public Law; Human Rights and Civil Liberties; Education; Local Government; Elections and Employment law.

=== Former members of the Court of Appeal of Jersey ===
- Sir Godfray Le Quesne QC (1964–97)
- Lord Ackner (1967–71), subsequently a judge of the High Court and Court of Appeal in England and Wales and a Lord of Appeal in Ordinary
- Lord Jauncy of Tullichettle (1972–79), subsequently a member of the judiciary in Scotland and a Lord of Appeal in Ordinary
- Rt Hon Sir Roger Parker (1974–77), subsequently a judge of the High Court and Court of Appeal of England and Wales
- Lord Browne Wilkinson (1976–77)
- Rt Hon Sir Martin Nourse (1977–80), subsequently a judge of the High Court and Court of Appeal
- Lord Neill of Bladon QC (1977–94)
- Lord Clyde (1979–85), subsequently a member of the judiciary in Scotland and a Lord of Appeal in Ordinary
- His Honour Henry Pownall (1980–84), subsequently a Permanent Judge at the Central Criminal Court in England
- Lord Hoffmann (1980–1985), subsequently a judge of the High Court and Court of Appeal in England and a Lord of Appeal in Ordinary
- Lord Alexander of Weedon QC
- Sir David Calcutt QC
- Rt Hon Sir John Chadwick (1986–93), subsequently a judge of the High Court and Court of Appeal in England and Wales
- Sir Louis Blom-Cooper QC (1988–96)
- Sir Sydney Kentridge QC (1988–92)
- Rt Hon Lord Hamilton (1988–95), subsequently Lord Justice General in Scotland
- Lord Carlisle of Bucklow QC (1990–99)
- Dame Elizabeth Gloster DBE (1993–2004), subsequently a judge of the High Court of England and Wales
- Richard Southwell QC (1994–2005)
- Lord Clarke (1995–2000), subsequently a member of the judiciary in Scotland
- Sir John Goldring (1998–99), subsequently a judge of the High Court and Senior Presiding Judge in England and Wales
- Sir Michael Tugendhat (2000–03), subsequently a judge of the High Court of England and Wales
- Rt Hon Sir Charles Mantell (-2007)
- Kenneth Rokison QC (-2007), subsequently an international commercial arbitrator
- Sir Geoffrey Vos (2005–09) a former chairman of the Bar of England and Wales and subsequently a judge of the High Court of England and Wales
- Peter David Smith QC (1996–2010), a barrister practising in Northern Ireland, where he served as a member of the Independent Commission on Policing for Northern Ireland and as the chairman of the Parole Commissioners for Northern Ireland
- Jonathan Sumption QC (1995–2011) was a London-based barrister practising from Brick Court Chambers, specialising in commercial, European Union and public law. In 2011 he became the first practitioner to be appointed directly to the United Kingdom Supreme Court.
- David Vaughan QC (appointed 2000), a London-based practitioner at Brick Court Chambers specialising in European Union law
- Dame Heather Steel DBE (2004–2012), High Court judge, England and Wales (Queen's Bench Division) 1993–2001

== Bailiff and Deputy Bailiff of Jersey ==
=== Current Bailiff and Deputy Bailiff ===
Name	Year appointed	Other judicial roles	Professional background
Tim Le Cocq	Bailiff of Jersey 2019	ex officio member of the Jersey Court of Appeal	HM Solicitor General 2008–2009; Attorney General 2009–2015; Deputy Bailiff 2015–2019
Robert MacRae	Deputy Bailiff 2020		HM Attorney General 2015–2020

=== Former Bailiffs and Deputy Bailiffs ===
The Deputy Bailiff (Appointment and Functions) (Jersey) Law 1958 created the office of Deputy Bailiff to cope with the Bailiff's increasing workload. The list below is of holders of the office of Deputy Bailiff who were not subsequently appointed as Bailiff.

- 1962-1968 Francis de Lisle Bois OBE
- 1986-1992 Vernon Tomes

== Commissioners of the Royal Court ==
Under the Royal Court (Jersey) Law 1948, Part II, Commissioners of the Royal Court are appointed by the Bailiff for the hearing of a specified cause or matter or a specified term.

=== Current Commissioners of the Royal Court ===
Name	Year appointed	Other judicial roles	Professional background
Bruce Blair QC		deputy High Court judge (Family Division) in England and Wales since 1990; chairman British Horseracing Authority Appeal Board	barrister at 1 Hare Court, London, specialising in family law
Julian Clyde-Smith			retired Jersey advocate and former partner in the law firm Ogier; founding member of the Jersey Financial Services Commission in 1997
Howard Page QC		former deputy president of Lloyd's Appeal Tribunal 2000-2010	barrister in England, specialising in commercial and construction law
Sir Christopher Pitchers		formerly a Recorder, then a Circuit Judge and in 2002-08 a High Court judge in England and Wales	called to the Bar of England and Wales 1965
Pamela Scriven QC		deputy High Court judge (Family Division) in England and Wales	called to the Bar of England and Wales 1970
Sir Charles Gray		formerly a High Court judge in England and Wales	associate member of 5RB barristers' chambers

=== Former Commissioners of the Royal Court ===
- Sir Richard Tucker (2003-July 2010), a retired High Court judge. He 'was initially appointed for a number of individual cases but in April 2004 was appointed for 12 months', an appointment that was renewed annually until his 80th birthday.
- Sir Geoffrey Nice QC (2006–2009)
- Sir Philip Bailhache (2009-July 2011), a retired Bailiff of Jersey
- Lord Sumption OBE PC QC. Already serving as a judge of the Jersey Court of Appeal, he was appointed as a Commissioner of the Royal Court in December 2010 but stated his intention to relinquish his judicial appointments in Jersey before he took his seat on the UK Supreme Court.

== Jurats ==
The Jurats are lay people who are the judges of fact when the Royal Court sits as the Inferior Number, and also pass sentence in criminal matters heard by the Royal Court. They hold office until the age of 72.

=== Current Jurats ===
The current Jurats are as follows:

Name	Year elected	Election details	Background
Collette Anne Crill	2011		Nine years service as a Director of the National Board of Amnesty International UK Section; 10 years service on Jersey Youth Court Panel; Member of Chartered Institute of Library and Information Professionals since 1972 Appointed as Lieutenant Bailiff in February 2019
Anthony John Olsen	2011		retired advocate of the Royal Court; former bâtonnier (head of the Jersey Bar); founding partner and former chairman of law firm Carey Olsen Appointed as Lieutenant Bailiff in February 2019
Charles Richard Blampied	2012		
Jeremy John Ramsden	2014		
Rozanne Barbara Thomas			
Jane Ronge			
Pamela Jean Pitman			
Robert Anthony Christensen M.B.E.			
Elizabeth Anne Dulake			
Steven William Austin-Vautier			
Joanne Kim Averty			
David Gareth Hughes			

=== Former jurats ===
This list contains jurats appointed from 1945.

- 1945-__ George Philip Billot
- 1946-__ William John Jervoise Collas
- 1946-__ Neville Godfray Hind
- 1946-__ John Le Marquand
- 1946-__ Percy Chambers Cabot
- 1947-__ Hedley Le Riche Edwards
- 1949-__ Reginald Philip Roissier
- 1949-__ Sir Daniel Alfred Edmond Cabot, formerly Chief Veterinary Officer of the United Kingdom
- 1949-__ Christopher John Molesworthy Riley, Seigneur of Trinity, Lieutenant-Colonel in the Royal Artillery
- 1949-__ Guy Malet de Carteret
- 1950-__ Gerald Renouf
- 1950-__ Cdr Edward Owen Obbard, DSC, GM (RN)
- 1951-__ Col Henry Monckton Vatcher, MC
- 1953-__ Donald Philip Norman
- 1954-65 Clifford Orange, educated at Victoria College, Deputy for St Brelade 1934-37 and Chief Aliens Officer 1937–46
- 1954-__ Major Leslie Thomas Anthoine, educated at Victoria College and Bristol University, Connétable of St Saviour 1923–48
- 1955-__ Ernest Benest, educated at Victoria College and had a career as a bank manager
- 1955-__ Capt Francis Ahier, merchant seaman
- 1955-59 Major General Basil Charles Davey, CB CBE, formerly a professional soldier
- 1955-__ Brigadier Stuart Douglas Graham, formerly a professional soldier
- 1957-__ Francis Renouf Billot
- 1958-__ Edward John Syvret
- 1959-__ Cecil Ernest Esnouf
- 1959-__ Capt Bertram Liott Blampied, educated at Victoria College and Sandhurst, grandson of Jurat T. Blampied and Jurat C.G. Renouf
- 1960-__ Francis Le Boutillier
- 1962-__ Alfred John Du Feu
- 1963-__ William Eugene de Faye, educated at Victoria College, called to the English and Jersey Bars in 1925, worked in banking in England and Jersey, chairman of the Jersey branch of the United Nations Association
- 1963-__ John Herbert Pallot
- 1964-__ Stuart Philip Pepin
- 1964-__ Richard Durnford Lloyd, educated at Victoria College, called to the English and Jersey Bars in 1937, served in the Colonial Legal Service in Nigeria and Malta
- 1965-__ Francis Edward Luce, educated at Oxenford House, farmer, served as a Deputy 1954–65
- 1966-__ Ralph Edward Bishop Voisin, educated at Victoria College, called to the Jersey Bar in 1925, served as Deputy for St Brelade 1937–45, Magistrate 1957–64
- 1966-__ Herbert Brooke
- 1966-__ Robert Hyland, MBE, career with Midland Bank
- 1967-__ Raymond Frank Le Brocq, educated at Jersey Modern School, director of Jersey Road Transport Ltd and Jersey Motor Transport Co Ltd
- 1968-__ William Francis Alfred Hamilton
- 1968-__ Roy Ernest Bailhache OBE
- 1969-__ Arthur Alfred Henry Downer
- 1969-__ Dennis William Ryan, educated at Victoria College and Gonville and Caius College, Cambridge, Connétable of St Helier, director of various companies
- 1972-82 Lester Vivian Bailhache MA, educated at Victoria College, Shrewsbury and Merton College, Oxford, called to the English Bar and in 1933 to the Jersey Bar, Lieutenant Bailiff 1980–82, Deputy of St Clement; his sons, Sir Philip Bailhache and William Bailhache, became Bailiffs.
- 1974-__ Herbert Henry Le Quesne
- 1974-__ Henry Perrée
- 1975-__ Raymond Helleur le Cornu
- 1975-__ Hon John Coutanche, a brewer and son of a former Bailiff, Lord Coutanche
- 1975-__ John Harold Vint, a farmer
- 1977-__ Maxwell Gordon Lucas
- 1977-86 Leslie Alexander Picot, educated at Jersey Modern School, qualified as an accountant in 1934 becoming a partner in Alex Picot & Co, Methodist local preacher
- 1977-__ George Norman Simon
- 1980-20__ Peter Gilroy Blampied
- 1980-2001 Barbara Myles OBE, a medical practitioner specialising in children's medicine and free-lance journalist, served on the Jersey Juvenile Court Panel 1970–80, first woman jurat
- 1982-__ Clarence Sheppard Dupré
- 1985-1997 Michael Walter Bonn, Kt. of Sovereign Military Order of Malta; Officer, Welsh Guards; ADC to Brigadier A.G. Bonn, CBE, MC; educated at Eton; director of Willis, Faber & Dumas Ltd 1965–76; director of Morgan Grenfell (Jersey) Ltd 1960–97; Committee of the Societe Jersaise 1985–88; served as Deputy of St Peter 1978–84; Chair of L.B. Bonn Memorial Foundation of the RNID 1996–1997 with Tstee & Hon. Sec: ITPC Commissioner Philip Bonn; and being a 6th generational descendant of the former Lt. Governor of Jersey (1761–1772) Gen. the Rt. Hon. Sir George Keppel, (3rd) Earl of Albemarle, KG, MP, PC; a great-grandson of HM King Charles II, who resided in Jersey, in 1646 and 1649, when styled as HRH The Prince of Wales
- 1986-__ John James Morel Orchard, educated in the UK and Ireland, had a career in banking after service in the RAF
- 1986-__ Geoffrey Hubert Hamon
- 1986-____ Charles Leonard Gruchy, veterinary surgeon, educated at Victoria College and Edinburgh University
- 1987-2003 Mazel Joan Le Ruez MBE, educated at the Girls Collegiate School, became Island Commissioner of the Girl Guides, guest house proprietor, served as a panel member of the Juvenile Court
- 1989-____ Alfred (known as Alf) Vibert, farmer, director of a building firm, guest house proprietor involved in the Honorary Police in St Brelade
- 1990-____ Ernest William ("Nick") Herbert, founding chairman of the Council for the Protection of Jersey's Heritage
- 1991-2004 Michael Arthur (known as Mike) Rumfitt (Lieutenant Bailiff 2003–04) was educated at Victoria College and had a career in journalism, retiring as editor of the Jersey Evening Post
- 1994-____ Edward James MacGregor Potter, educated at Manchester Grammar School, formerly a law draftsman and Greffier to the States of Jersey
- 1995-2011 Philip John de Veulle OBE (1995–2011, Lieutenant Bailiff from 1999), retired chartered accountant, also served as chairman of the Jersey Heritage Trust
- 1996-2004 Arthur Philip Quérée, Connétable of St Ouen
- 1997-2010 Sally Carolyn Le Brocq OBE, founding member of Victim Support Jersey, daughter of the Bailiff Cecil Harrison
- 1997-2012 John Claude Tibbo (Lieutenant Bailiff 2010–12): educated at Victoria College, worked for Midland Bank in Jersey for 37 years until his retirement in 1996, Commissioner of the Jersey Financial Services Commission 1998-2005 and in 2011 was appointed a non-executive director of Jersey Development Company Ltd
- 1998-2009 Roy Malcolm Bullen, formerly the Jersey Harbourmaster and chairman of the Jersey Lifeboat Management Group
- 1998-2012 John Lyndon Le Breton, former Vice Principal of Victoria College
- 1999-2006 Donald Henry Georgelin
- 1999-2009 Geoffrey Charles Allo
- 2003-11 Lorna Jean (known as Jean) King, MBE, a former nurse and founder of Jersey Hospice Care
- 2004-09 Mary Newcombe, formerly Greffier to the States of Jersey
- 2004-11 Paul Frith Liddiard, a dental surgeon.

== Magistrates and Assistant Magistrates of Jersey ==
Name	Year appointed	Notes/Professional background
Bridget Shaw	Magistrate 2013; Deputy Magistrate 2008	lawyer working for the Crown Prosecution Service in England and latterly for the Law Officers' Department in Jersey. Sworn in as magistrate on 15 March 2013.

=== Former Magistrates ===
- 1950s E.A. Dorey CBE
- 1957-1964 Ralph Edward Bishop Voisin: he was elected as a Jurat in 1966
- ____
- 1999-2008 Ian Le Marquand: educated at Victoria College, after private practice he served as Judicial Greffier and Master of the Royal Court. In 2008 he was elected a Senator in the States of Jersey and serves as minister for home affairs in the Council of Ministers.
- ?-2013 Ian Christmas: Mr Christmas has not sat judicially since 2008 when an investigation into allegations of fraud commenced; he was convicted in 2012 but remained in office until he resigned in February 2013.
