= Philip Bailhache =

Jersey politician and lawyer (born 1946)

Deputy Sir Philip Bailhache KC
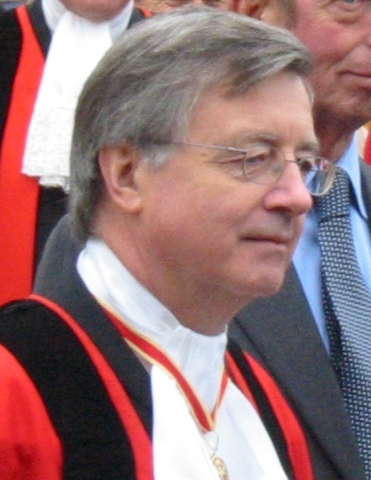
- Bailhache in 2007

Deputy for St Clement
- Incumbent
- Assumed office 22 June 2022

Minister for External Relations
- In office 2013–2018
- Chief Minister: Ian Gorst
- Preceded by: Office established
- Succeeded by: Ian Gorst

Senator
- In office 2011–2018
- Constituency: Island-wide

Bailiff of Jersey
- In office 1995–2009
- Monarch: Elizabeth II
- Governor: General Sir Michael Wilkes; ACM Sir John Cheshire; Lt General Sir Andrew Ridgway
- Preceded by: Sir Peter Crill
- Succeeded by: Sir Michael Birt

Deputy Bailiff of Jersey
- In office 1994–1995
- Preceded by: Vernon Tomes
- Succeeded by: Francis Hamon

Attorney-General
- In office 1986–1994
- Preceded by: Vernon Tomes
- Succeeded by: Michael Birt

Solicitor-General
- In office 1975–1986
- Preceded by: Vernon Tomes
- Succeeded by: Terence Sowden

Deputy for Grouville
- In office 1972–1975

Personal details
- Born: Philip Martin Bailhache; 1946 (age 79–80) Jersey, Channel Islands
- Party: Jersey Liberal Conservatives
- Relatives: Sir William Bailhache (brother)

Sir Philip Martin Bailhache KC (/ˈbælæʃ/ BAL-ash) is a former Jersey politician and lawyer.

He served as Deputy for Grouville in the States Assembly from 1972 to1975.

Between 1975 and 2009, he held in turn in the four Crown Offices, as HM Solicitor General, HM Attorney General, Deputy Bailiff, and Bailiff of Jersey.

After retiring as Bailiff, he was elected as a Senator in the States Assembly in the 2011 general election. He served as Jersey’s first Minister for External Relations from 2013 to 2018.

In 2021, he founded the political party Jersey Liberal Conservatives, a centre-right party later renamed Advance Jersey. He stood again in the 2022 general election, and was elected as a Deputy for St Clement.

== Early life ==
Bailhache was born in Jersey on 28 February 1946. He went to school at St. Michael's Preparatory School and Charterhouse School, England. He studied Law at Pembroke College, Oxford.

Bailhache's family has a strong legal and political heritage. His grandfather was a Jersey solicitor and served as Deputy for Grouville. His father, Lester Vivian Bailhache (1910–2005), was both a barrister called to the English Bar and an advocate in Jersey. He served as Deputy of St. Clement and later as a Jurat of the Royal Court of Jersey, holding the position of Lieutenant-Bailiff from 1980 to 1982. His brother, William Bailhache, has held several prominent legal roles, including HM Attorney General (2000–2009), Deputy Bailiff (2009–2015), and Bailiff (2015–2019). William currently serves as a Commissioner of the Royal Court and a member of the Jersey Court of Appeal.

== Legal career ==
Bailhache was called to the English Bar in 1968 and the Jersey Bar in 1969. He practised from the family law firm, Bailhache & Bailhache in Hill Street, St Helier.

Bailhache served as a Law Officer of the Crown for 19 years, first as HM Solicitor General (1975–1985) and subsequently as HM Attorney General (1986–1993).

== Judicial appointments ==
In 1994, Bailhache became the Deputy Bailiff of Jersey, following the controversial removal from office of the previous Deputy Bailiff Vernon Tomes. He was appointed Bailiff of Jersey in 1995, in succession to Sir Peter Crill and was sworn in on 2 February 1995. As Deputy Bailiff and Bailiff, he was an ex officio judge of the Court of Appeal of Jersey. He was a judge of the Court of Appeal of Guernsey from 1995 to 2009.

Bailhache introduced several modernisations to Jersey's legal system. In 1997, he was the founding editor of the Jersey Law Review (from 2007 the Jersey and Guernsey Law Review). In 1998, he led the setting up and became the first chairman of the Jersey Legal Information Board, a project designed to use technologies to streamline the administration of justice and make Jersey court judgments more easily accessible as part of the worldwide free access to law movement. In 2008, he became the first chairman of the Governing Body of Jersey's law school, the Institute of Law, a not-for-profit organisation providing courses for candidates sitting the Jersey advocates and solicitors examinations and students taking the University of London LLB degree via the International Programmes.

In July 2005, the Policy and Resources Committee of the States of Jersey established the Constitutional Review Group, with terms of reference 'to conduct a review and evaluation of the potential advantages and disadvantages for Jersey in seeking independence from the United Kingdom or other incremental change in the constitutional relationship, while retaining the Queen as Head of State'. Bailhache was invited to chair the Group, which produced a 'Second Interim Report' in December 2007, presented to the States by the Council of Ministers in June 2008.

He said the following in his May 2008 Liberation Day speech about international reporting of child abuse investigations on the island:

"All child abuse, wherever it happens, is scandalous, but it is the unjustified and remorseless denigration of Jersey and her people that is the real scandal."

His words were condemned by a support group for those who grew up in care on Jersey. Bailhache justified his comments. A vote of no-confidence in the Bailiff was proposed by Jersey Democratic Alliance member Deputy Shona Pitman on 15 July 2008, citing his speech and the fact he allowed a convicted paedophile - Roger Holland - to remain an honorary policeman in 1992 after being told about him. Jersey's Chief Minister and Jersey Evening Post proprietor, Frank Walker, whose own speech was criticised, defended Bailhache, describing him as "an honourable man"; the proposal was rejected by 47 votes to 3. Holland continued sexually abusing children over six years in the St. Helier honorary police; for eight such offences in total he was gaoled in 2008.

Bailhache retired from the office of Bailiff at the end of June 2009 and was succeeded by Mr Michael Birt. He was an active member of the Commonwealth Magistrates and Judges' Association and became its Executive Vice-President in September 2009, following the retirement of Sir Henry Brooke. In 2010, he set up the CMJA Endowment Trust, a charity advising and financially supporting judicial independence and training in Commonwealth countries. He continued to sit as a Commissioner (part-time judge) of the Royal Court of Jersey until July 2011.

In 2016, referring to Roger Holland's earlier conviction, Bailhache told the Independent Jersey Care Inquiry that more was known about paedophiles now, saying, "It was reasonable to conclude he had been re-habilitated. What Holland did was put his hand up a girl's pullover. It was an unpleasant thing to do but across the range of sexual offences it was at the lower end of the scale," and "The action of suspending Roger Holland immediately after he had been sworn in would have been a very extraordinary thing to do." The completed Inquiry, published on 3 July 2017, commented on his Liberation Day speech: "We cannot accept that a politician and lawyer of his [Bailhache's] experience would inadvertently have made what he told the Inquiry was an 'unfortunate juxtaposition' of words", calling his link between Jersey's reputation and the child abuse investigation "a grave political error". Bailhache said he accepted the inquiry panel's comments and apologised for any distress caused.

== Political career ==
Bailhache was elected to the States of Jersey as deputy of Grouville in 1972, resigning his seat in 1975 on his appointment as Solicitor General.

In 2009, Bailhache and his wife were among prominent islanders to give public support to a campaign to introduce civil partnerships for gay people in Jersey. For many years, Bailhache has promoted reconciliation between the peoples of Jersey and Germany, especially in Bad Wurzach, where many islanders were interned during the Second World War.

In written evidence to Lord Carswell's 2010 inquiry into reform of Jersey's Crown Officers, including the role of the Bailiff, Bailhache concluded that "the current system works extremely well and there is no reason for change".

In July 2011, he announced that he was standing in the elections for the four vacant Senatorial seats in Jersey's October 2011 general election. He came top of the poll, receiving 17,538 votes (80.2% of votes cast). He subsequently stood for election to the post of Chief Minister, but was defeated by 27 votes to 24 by Ian Gorst on 14 November 2011.

Bailhache has called for changes to the Channel Islands' relationship with the United Kingdom government, arguing that "at the very least, we should be ready for independence if we are placed in a position where that course was the only sensible option".

On 7 March 2012, the States appointed Bailhache as chairman of Jersey's Electoral Commission. The Electoral Commission was set up to examine the constitution of the States Assembly.

On 24 June 2021, Bailhache announced he would launch a new political party called the Jersey Liberal Conservatives.

The JLC garnered sufficient support to field candidates in the 2022 Jersey general election, and entered into a coalition with the Progress Party.

In 2024, he proposed new Franglais (English-French bilingual) school tuition from 2025.

== Honours ==
In 1989 he became one of the first two Queen's Counsel learned in the law of Jersey. He received a knighthood in the 1996 Birthday Honours. In 2006, he was awarded l'Ordre de la Pléiade (Grand Officier class) by l'Assemblée parlementaire de la Francophonie. He is an honorary fellow of Pembroke College, Oxford (elected 1995) and an Honorary Bencher of the Middle Temple (2003).

== See also ==
- List of foreign ministers in 2017
- List of current foreign ministers
