= Judiciary of Jersey =

Judicial branch of the government of the island of Jersey

The judiciary of Jersey is a branch of the government of Jersey that interprets and applies the laws of Jersey, to ensure equal justice under law, and to provide a mechanism for dispute resolution. The Bailiff of Jersey is the President of the Royal Court (and also of the Court of Appeal). Individual trials are heard by the Bailiff, the Deputy Bailiff (also a full-time role) or a Commissioner. The Master of the Royal Court deals with some preliminary matters in civil cases. The Court is supported by the Judicial Greffier who acts as the registrar. In addition to the judge, the Royal Court includes a number of volunteer Jurats. The Jurats decide issues of fact in criminal and civil trials (except criminal assizes, when a jury is present), hand down sentences in criminal trials and award damages in civil trials. All judges in Jersey are bound by a code of conduct, introduced in 2007, which requires them to "uphold the integrity and independence of the judiciary and perform their duties with competence, diligence and dedication".

== Appointment and removal ==
=== Crown Officers ===
The Bailiff and Deputy Bailiff are appointed by the King, on the advice of the UK Secretary of State for Justice. Vacancies for the Deputy Bailiff, Attorney General and Solicitor General are usually advertised and a shortlist of candidates is prepared by a selection panel comprising the Bailiff, the senior Jurat and the chairperson of the Jersey Appointments Commission. The selection panel interviews the candidates after consulting the Jurats, the States Consultative Panel (which includes the Chief Minister), some elected States members, senior lawyers (the Bâtonnier, the President of the Law Society, the former President of the Law Society of Jersey and the President of the Chambre des Ecrivains), the other Crown Officers and the local Commissioner of the Royal Court. The Lieutenant Governor then sends a single name to the Secretary of State for Justice. This process is not used for appointing the Bailiff because the Deputy Bailiff is seen to be training for the office of Bailiff. The Bailiff, Deputy Bailiff and members of the Jersey Court of Appeal 'hold office during good behaviour'. The Secretary of State for Justice can dismiss a Jersey judge without consulting the States of Jersey, unlike senior judges in England and Wales whose dismissal requires the consent of both Houses of Parliament. In 1992, when Deputy Bailiff Vernon Tomes was dismissed by the Home Secretary (who at the time was responsible for Crown Dependencies) because he was slow to present written judgments.

=== Commissioners ===
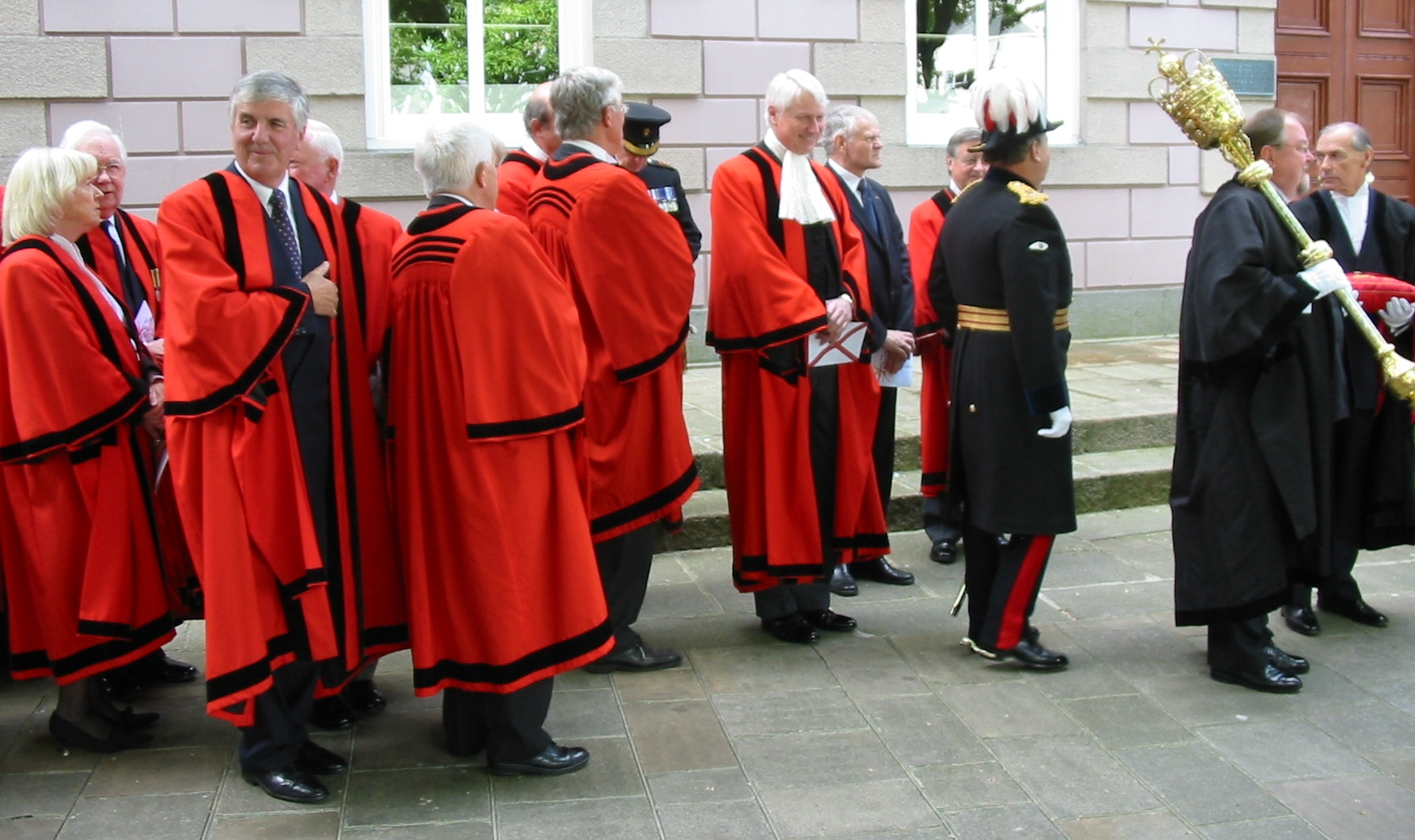
The Bailiff and Jurats outside the Royal Court in 2009

Commissioners of the Royal Court are part-time judges, appointed by the Bailiff from either Commonwealth judges or senior experienced lawyers from the United Kingdom and Islands, either for defined periods of time or for specific cases.

=== Jurats ===
Jurats are unpaid lay people, aged 40 or more, elected through secret ballot by an electoral college of the Bailiff, the existing Jurats, the Connétables, the elected Members of the States, and advocates and solicitors of the Royal Court. Jurats hold office until the age of 72. The Court can call for the resignation of any Jurat who "is permanently unable to carry out the duties of the office", and if the Jurat refuses to resign, the Bailiff and five or more Jurats of the Royal Court can request an Order of Her Majesty in Council to enforce resignation.

=== Magistrates ===
The Bailiff also appoints, on the advice of a panel, a full-time salaried Magistrate (originally known as the Juge d'Instruction) and Assistant Magistrate and part-time locum Relief Magistrates. The Magistrates can only be dismissed by an Order of Her Majesty in Council. In June 2008, a Magistrate-Designate, Ian Christmas, did not take up his post because he was being investigated for alleged fraud, which resulted in a conviction and a fifteen-month prison term. Subsequently, the Bailiff's Office asked the Ministry of Justice to arrange a disciplinary investigation because Ian Christmas could not be removed from office by the Bailiff.

== Judicial independence ==
=== Dual role of the Bailiff ===
The courts of Jersey are required by the European Convention on Human Rights to be independent and impartial. In 2000, the European Court of Human Rights ruled that there was a breach of the Convention in neighbouring Guernsey where the Bailiff or Deputy Bailiff sat as President of the States of Guernsey when legislation was being debated and subsequently presided in the Royal Court of Guernsey in a case where that legislation was relevant. Although there was no suggestion that the Bailiff was subjectively biased, the mere fact that this happened could cast doubt on the Bailiff's impartiality. A Bailiff or Deputy Bailiff in Jersey could avoid such a situation by not sitting in Royal Court cases concerned with legislation that was debated when he presided in the States, but there were suggestions that reform might be needed.

=== Carswell report ===
During 2009–2010, the States of Jersey commissioned an inquiry, chaired by Lord Carswell, into the roles of Jersey's Crown Officers i.e. the Bailiff, Deputy Bailiff, Attorney General and Solicitor General. The subsequent report recommended reforms to the States of Jersey, including suggesting that the Bailiff should no longer be the President of the States, something the States did not endorse.

=== Criticism ===
In recent years, a former States member, Stuart Syvret, has argued that the Jersey judiciary do not appear impartial and independent. In July 2008, Syvret and UK Liberal Democrat MP John Hemming sought a judicial review of what they saw as Jack Straw's failure to ensure that Jersey authorities protected child abuse victims. In March 2009, the Administrative Court refused permission for the case to proceed to a full hearing. In 2010, Syvret commenced an unsuccessful civil action in the Royal Court against the Chief Minister, the States Employment Board and the Attorney General of Jersey. His arguments relating to lack of independence and impartiality because judges are appointed by the Bailiff and judges have attend social events with the Bailiff, were rejected by the Royal Court and Court of Appeal in Jersey several times between 2009 and 2011.

== See also ==
- List of members of the judiciary of Jersey
- Courts of Jersey
- Law of Jersey
