= Frank Ereaut =

Bailiff of Jersey

Philip Le Feuvre House foundation stone.

Sir Herbert Frank Cobbold Ereaut (6 May 1919 – 11 September 1998) was Bailiff of Jersey from 1975 to 1985.

Sir Peter Crill was appointed Deputy Bailiff in 1974 and then succeeded Sir Frank Ereaut as Bailiff of Jersey in January 1986.

== Early life ==
Ereaut was born in London, the son of Herbert Parker Ereaut (who predeceased him having been killed in active service in 1918) and May Julia Cobbold. Ereaut was the grandson of James J Ereaut, a Connétable of St Saviour.

Ereaut was educated at Victoria College Prep School in Jersey, Tormore Preparatory School in Deal and Cranleigh School. He was a Kitchener Scholar at Exeter College, Oxford. During the Second World War, he served in the Royal Army Service Corps, attaining the rank of captain.

== Legal career ==
Ereaut was called to the English and Jersey Bars in 1947.

He was appointed HM Solicitor General in 1958 and HM Attorney General in 1962.

== Judicial appointments ==
Appointment as Deputy Bailiff came in 1969 and he became Bailiff in 1975, succeeding Sir Robert Le Masurier. His time as a Crown Officer coincided with Jersey's negotiations with the United Kingdom Government about the constitutional implications for Jersey of the United Kingdom's accession to the European Economic Community.

He was described as 'the gentlest of gentlemen'.

== Honours ==
Ereaut was knighted in 1976.

== Personal life ==
Ereaut married Kay Fitzgibbon from County Cork. They had one daughter, Elizabeth In February 1986, he was appointed a director of Standard Chartered Bank (CI).
