= Basil Davey =

British Army general

Major-General Basil Davey CB CBE
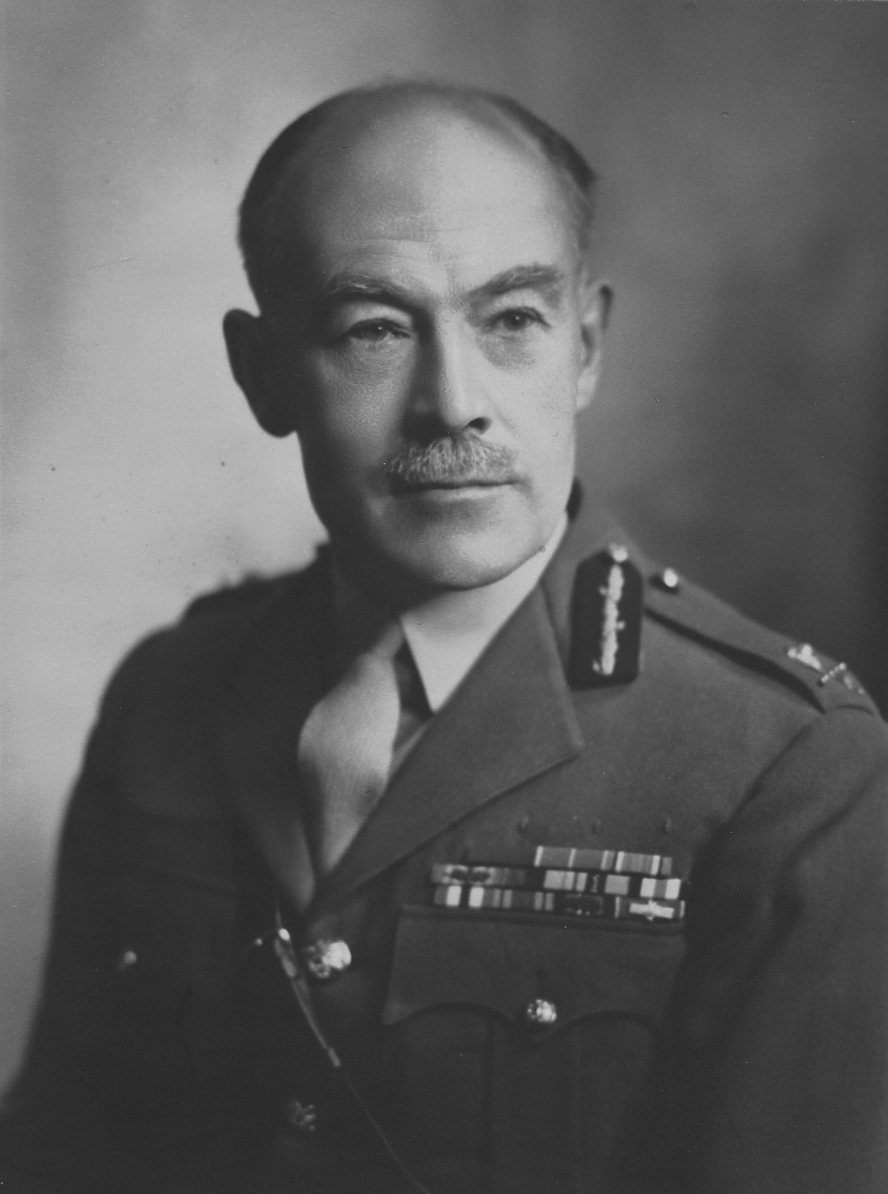
- Davey in 1953
- Born: Basil Charles Davey; 21 November 1897; St. Lawrence, Jersey
- Died: 20 November 1959 (aged 62); Russell Square, London
- Burial place: St. Lawrence's churchyard, St. Lawrence, Jersey
- Military career
- Allegiance: United Kingdom
- Branch: British Army
- Service years: 1916–1954
- Rank: Major-General
- Service number: 14351
- Commands: CRE 6 Armd Div (1939–1942); CRE XXX Corps (1943–1945); CRE 8th Army (1945); Commandant RSME (1948–1951); Commandant RMCS (1951–1954)
- Conflicts: World War I; World War II
- Awards: CB (1951); CBE (1944); Legion of Merit (Commander) (USA) (1945); Mentioned in Despatches (1920, 1946)
- Other work: Jurat (Jersey) (1955-1959)

Major-General Basil Charles Davey CB CBE (21 November 1897 – 20 November 1959) commanded the group with principal responsibility for bridging the various major obstacles as part of Operation Market Garden and later became Commandant of the Royal Military College of Science.

== Early life and career ==
Basil Davey was educated at Blundell's School in Tiverton, RMA in Woolwich and at Jesus College, Cambridge.

He was commissioned second lieutenant into the Royal Engineers on 26 August 1916 and saw active service with 1 Field Squadron during the First World War, where he was Mentioned in Dispatches. He was promoted lieutenant on 26 February 1918. After the war, in around 1920, he was posted to India with the 2nd Queen Victoria's Own Sappers and Miners. He was promoted captain on 24 September 1926.

In 1928, Captain Davey was posted to Catterick as Assistant Chief Royal Engineer (Asst-CRE). In October 1930 he was posted as an Instructor (Engineering) to the Royal Military College of Canada, in Ontario, until July 1934. On return from Canada, Davey was posted to Chatham to take command of a Squadron Training Battalion, Chatham. He was promoted to major on 16 July 1936 and qualified as an Interpreter (1st Class) and was posted to Rome. In 1938, he returned to Catterick.

== Second World War ==
At the start of the Second World War Davey was appointed Chief Royal Engineer of 6 Armoured Division and saw service in Algeria and Tunisia. He was promoted to substantive lieutenant colonel on 1 August 1942 and as acting-Brigadier was engaged on planning as Chief Engineer XXX Corps for the Allied Invasion of Sicily, under Lt Gen Sir Oliver Leese, for which he was appointed a Commander of the Order of the British Empire on 23 March 1944 (the citation for which is available in The National Archive at Kew).

XXX Corps was subsequently called home to take part in the Normandy landings and Davey remained the Corps' Chief Engineer through Operation Overlord, the crossing of the Seine and Operation Market Garden. He returned to England in November 1944.

In early 1945 he was posted to Italy as Chief Engineer 8th Army and in May 1945 he became the Chief Engineer of the British Force that advanced into Austria. He was promoted to colonel on 1 Aug 1945 and was awarded the US Legion of Merit (Commander) at Schloß Schönbrun on 1 September 1946.

== Post war ==
Davey returned to England in 1947 and the following year was appointed Commandant of the Royal School of Military Engineering. Promoted to brigadier on 29 November 1949, he was appointed a Commander Order of the Bath on 1 June 1951. He became Commandant of the Royal Military College of Science on 1 August 1951 and was promoted to the substantive rank of major general on 14 May 1952.

He retired from the Army on 20 September 1954 and lived in Jersey, where he was a Jurat of the Royal Court of Jersey.

== Family ==
Davey married Enid Sanford Tudor Tudor, niece of both Admiral Sir Frederick Charles Tudor Tudor KCB KCMG and Admiral Henry Morton Tudor on 23 June 1926 at St Martin in the Fields, London. They had four children together, two of whom served in the Army; Anthony Davey served in the 1st The Royal Dragoons and Major Christopher Davey, noted Hot Air Balloonist and 2nd Royal Tank Regiment officer, whose children also serve. His grandson, Colonel Dominic Davey commanded The Royal Dragoon Guards from Nov 2019 to Feb 2022 and his granddaughter, Lt Col Colette Davey is the Senior Medical Officer for London District (British Army).

== Sources ==
- Obituary of Major-Gen. B.C. Davey, The Times, Monday, 23 November 1959 (pg. 16; Issue 54625; col C)
- Royal Engineers Museum, Royal Engineers and Operation Market Garden (1944), Extracted 8 October 2009
- Generals of World War II

Military offices
Preceded by Bryan Godfrey-Faussett	Commandant of the School of Military Engineering; 1948−1951	Succeeded by C. E. A. Browning
Preceded by John Eldridge	Commandant of the Military College of Science; 1951−1954	Succeeded by Edwyn Cobb
