= Peter Crill =

Bailiff of Jersey

Sir Peter Crill KBE

Bailiff of Jersey
- In office 1986–1991
- Preceded by: Frank Ereaut
- Succeeded by: Philip Bailhache

Personal details
- Born: 1 February 1925
- Died: 3 October 2005 (aged 80)
- Education: Victoria Collage

Sir Peter Leslie Crill KBE (1 February 1925 – 3 October 2005) was Bailiff of Jersey from 1986 to 1991.

== Early life ==
Crill attended Victoria College, Jersey between 1932 and 1943. He started work, during the German occupation of Jersey, for the law firm Crill and Benest, where his father was a partner.

As a young man, he was one of the few people who successfully escaped from German-occupied Jersey during the Second World War. With two friends he retrieved the family’s 12 ft (3.7 m) dinghy from store, hiding it while it was made seaworthy. They set out at 8.15pm at the end of the first week in November 1944, choosing a place where they knew the nearest German guard was at least 100 yards (91 m) away (there were some 13,000 German troops garrisoning 26,000 islanders). The danger was that if they failed to get far enough out to sea, they would simply be carried round the island by the tide and spotted at daylight. Rowing out through a heavy swell till they could safely start the engine, they soon had to stop, to go to the aid of a second boat behind them. When the engine would not restart, they put up a small sail, but lost the compass in a squall an hour later. With the sea too rough to sail, they allowed the boat to drift, feeling thoroughly seasick after years ashore. Soon after dawn, the tide began to carry them away from land. Finally, they restarted the motor and landed safely at Agon-Coutainville near Coutances.

From France, Crill crossed to England. He later wrote of the escape 'With hindsight we achieved very little except to confirm through the memorandum of the then Bailiff, Mr A.M. Coutanche, the state of the Island as regards food and heating. Coutanche had prepared a memorandum about the problems facing the Island and had handed it to the German authorities. It contained a hint that if they failed to fulfil their obligations under the Geneva Convention that might be something to be levelled against them after the war'.

He read modern history at Exeter College, Oxford and in 1949 was called to the bar in Jersey.

== Political career ==
At the age of 26, Crill was elected to the States of Jersey as a Deputy for St Clement from 1951 to 1958. During this period he was President of the Legislation Committee and was responsible for introducing examinations for candidates seeking to become Jersey advocates and solicitors. In 1960, he was elected as a Senator.

== Legal career ==
In 1962, Crill resigned from elected office to take up the post of HM Solicitor General. He became HM Attorney General in 1969, and led the prosecution of Edward Paisnel.

== Judicial appointments ==
Crill served as Deputy Bailiff 1974–86 and Bailiff 1986–95.

Among the trials he presided over in the Royal Court was that of the murders of Nicholas and Elizabeth Newell. As Bailiff of Jersey, he was ex officio a member of the Guernsey Court of Appeal. As a judge of that court in 1996, his comment that 'A conscientious mason will, if anything, bring to the office of jurat another degree of probity that will enhance not detract from that office' was reported in the national press.

He was said to have 'enjoyed the theatricality of the part of bailiff—the elaborate costumes, the steely gaze—and was often seen as a little grandiose and distant'. A senior Jersey politician said 'He was always very dignified in office, a great traditionalist'. Another that 'A man who appeared to have a tough exterior, Sir Peter also had a great capacity to be hurt as he was on several occasions during his time as Bailiff'.

=== The Tomes affair ===
In the early 1990s, Crill faced one of the toughest challenges of his career in handling 'the Tomes affair', which ultimately led to the United Kingdom Home Secretary Kenneth Clarke removing the Deputy Bailiff Vernon Tomes from office in 1992. Sir Peter received complaints from lawyers and the Jersey Law Society about Tomes' delays in producing reserved judgments. Prior to their appointments as Crown Officers, Crill and Tomes had been partners in the same legal practice. In 1990, the then Home Secretary David Waddington gave Mr Tomes six months to clear a backlog in judgment writing and in October 1991, Kenneth Baker gave him a further three months to rectify the delays.

In March 1992, a senior home office official gave Tomes seven days to resign, prompting a delegation of Jersey politicians to travel to the Home Office to protest and a reversal of that ultimatum. In May 1992, however, Tomes was finally told he would be removed from office with effect on 1 July 1992, provoking a demonstration of 1,000 people in his support.

Tomes was reported as saying that 'Sir Peter Crill has been the sole instigator behind this. I have warned him he will have no rest while he remains in office because I am determined now to enter the States and change the constitution'. Sir Peter "called for the people of Jersey to consider the situation calmly". In 1993, Tomes successfully stood for elected office as a Senator in the States of Jersey but failed to bring about any constitutional reforms.

=== Social conservatism ===
Sir Peter's outlook was socially conservative. While serving as Bailiff, he wrote letters in a personal capacity to The Times expressing disquiet about aspects of the changing world, including the campaign to admit women members to the Oxford and Cambridge Club in London and proposals to give degree-awarding powers to polytechnics.

As Bailiff, Sir Peter, with the assistance of an advisory panel, exercised powers to license public entertainment in the island. He refused permission for a visiting amateur theatre group to perform Howard Brenton's play Christie in Love and required changes to the staging of a production of Shakespeare's Coriolanus by the Tricycle Theatre Company to prevent an actor's naked buttocks being visible to the audience. On several occasions, however, 'he suggested that the role of chief censor should not lie with him, but should be at taken on by the elected members of the States'.

== Honours ==
Crill was appointed a Commander of the Order of the British Empire (CBE) in the 1980 Birthday Honours, knighted in 1987 and made KBE in 1995. In 1994, the refurbished wing of the former nurses' home in Gloucester Street, St Helier was renamed 'Peter Crill House'. In 1997, he was awarded an honorary LLD degree by the University of Buckingham.

== Private life ==
Crill married Gail Dodd, a medical doctor, in 1953. They had three daughters. His pastimes included amateur dramatics, yachting and supporting Jersey's draghunt.

Following his retirement in 1995, he was active in organizations promoting the culture of Jersey, including the Société Jersiaise and the Jersey Arts Centre. A practising Christian, from 1957 he sang in St Helier Church Choir and later Trinity Church. He was received into the Catholic Church in July 1995.

His activities in latter years were curtailed by the onset of motor neurone disease. An autobiography entitled A Little Brief Authority: A Memoir was privately published shortly after his death, causing some controversy.
