= Commencement of proceedings in Jersey law =

An Order of Justice is one of three types of originating process used in the Royal Court of the Island of Jersey (part of the British Isles). It is a combination of the originating process (in England & Wales, for example a "writ") and a statement of claim. The other types of originating process are the [simple] Summons and the Representation.

== See also ==
- Law of Jersey
