= Law of Jersey =

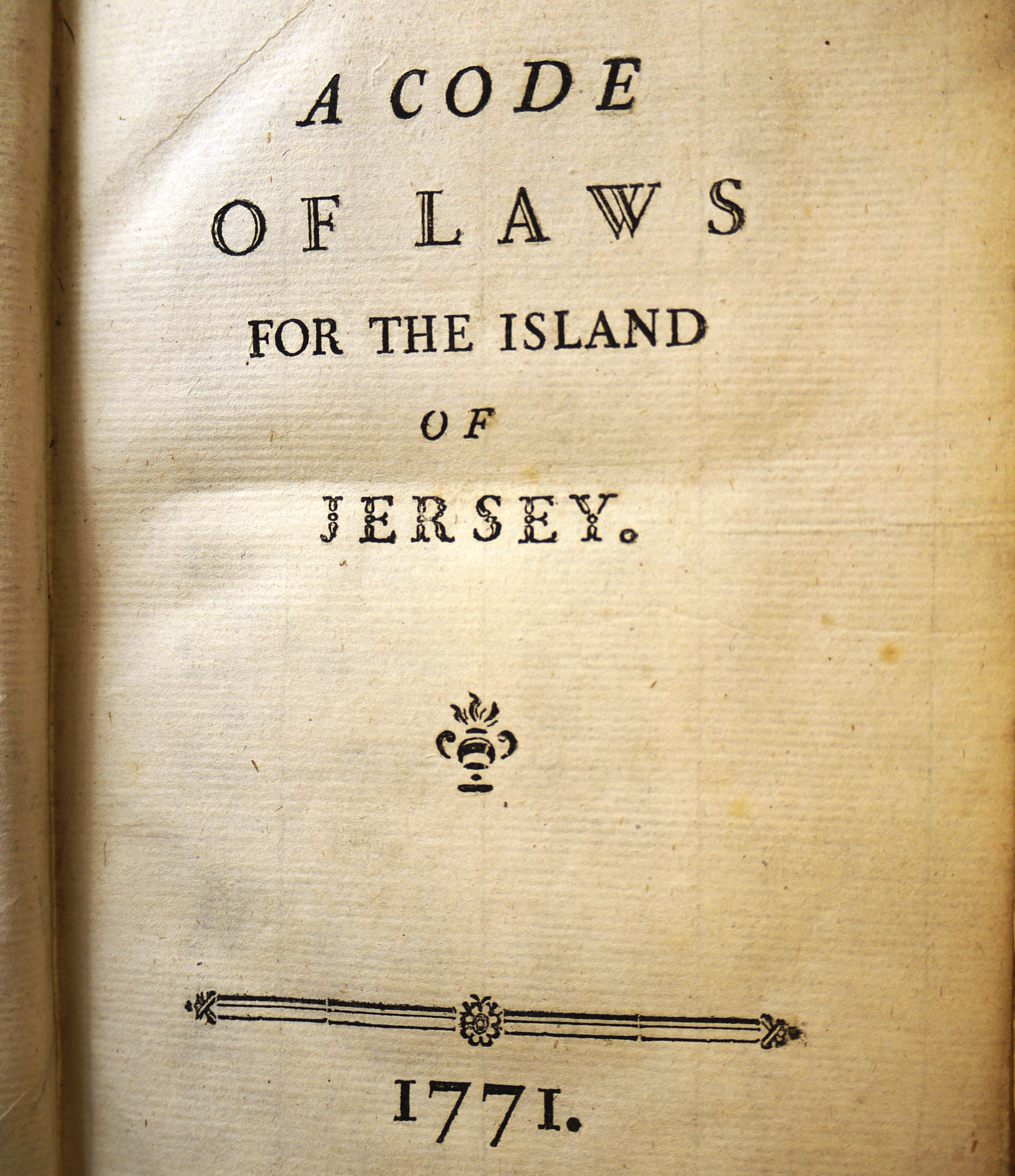
The Code des Lois of 1771, an important record of Jersey laws

The law of Jersey has been influenced by several different legal traditions, in particular Norman customary law, English common law and modern French civil law. The Bailiwick of Jersey is a separate jurisdiction from that of the United Kingdom, and is also distinct from that of the other Channel Islands such as Guernsey, although they do share some historical developments. Jersey's legal system is 'mixed' or 'pluralistic', and sources of law are in French and English languages, although since the 1950s the main working language of the legal system is English.

== Sources of law ==
=== Legislation adopted by the States ===
Jersey's legislature, the States Assembly makes legislation affecting most areas of activity.

==== Laws ====
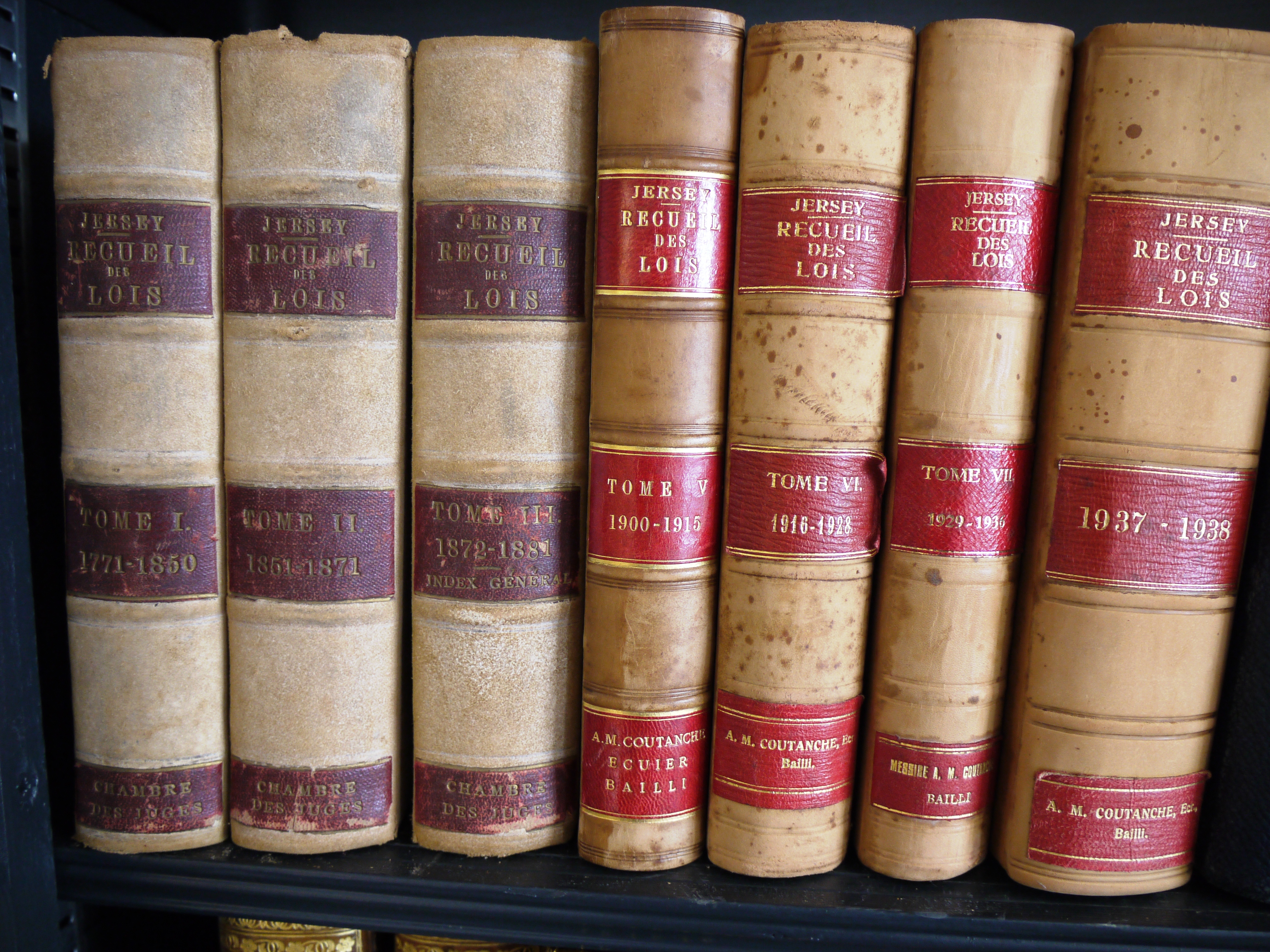
Recueil de Lois de Jersey from 1771

The highest form of legislation made by the States is "Laws". If a proposed Law is likely to be controversial, the general desirability of having new legislation on the topic may be debated before the law is drafted.

The procedure for making laws is set out in the Standing Orders of the States of Jersey. Once the Law is in draft from, it starts the legislative process as a 'draft Law' which may be introduced to the States by a minister, any States member, a scrutiny panel or the Comité des Connétables.

- At the stage known as "first reading", the title of the draft Law is read out and the draft Law is "lodged au Greffe", providing a two to six week breathing space for members to read the draft Law. Under Article 16 of the Human Rights (Jersey) Law 2000, the minister or other person lodging the draft Law au Greffe must make a written statement that the provisions of the draft Law are compatible with Convention rights or "make a statement that although [he or she] is unable to make a statement of compatibility, [he or she] nevertheless wants the States to proceed with the draft Law".
- At the next stage (second reading), there is a formal debate in the States chamber during which members consider the principle of the draft Law and then scrutinise the draft in detail.
- At third reading there is an opportunity for minor drafting errors to be corrected.
- Finally, members vote on whether to adopt the law.

The law is then submitted via the Lieutenant Governor's office for transmission to London, where officials in the Ministry of Justice examine the law. In 2010, the House of Commons Justice Committee was highly critical of the UK Government's approach, finding that "The islands are more than adequately advised by their own law officers and parliamentary counsel. It seems a strange use of Ministry of Justice resources ... to engage in a kind of legislative oversight which does not restrict itself to the constitutional grounds for scrutiny". This process may take several months. In an unusual move in 2011, campaigners against a law that sought to reduce the number of senators in the States petitioned the Privy Council to advise the Queen to refuse royal assent. Once official scrutiny is complete in London, the law is formally presented to His Majesty for royal assent at a meeting of the Privy Council, usually held at Buckingham Palace or Windsor Castle.

After a Law receives royal assent, the final step is for it be registered with the Royal Court of Jersey. At this point it is "passed". The Law may specify that it can be brought into force at a date decided by the relevant Jersey minister, or the States Assembly may adopt a "Commencement Act". There may be a considerable delay between a law being passed and it becoming legally effective if, for example, civil servants need to be trained, computer systems put in place or money found to pay for the new scheme.

Laws adopted and passed are published in print in Recueil des Lois de Jersey and online by the Jersey Legal Information Board on the Jersey Law website.

==== Other types of legislation ====
In Jersey, there are other types of legislation in addition to laws.

- Regulations: these are used where a law delegates to the States Assembly power to make legally binding rules to implement a named law.
- Triennial regulations: since the 18th century, the States of Jersey has had power to make provisional regulations of up to three years' duration.
- Orders and rules: these are generally made by a minister, within the scope of powers set out in a law.

=== Case law ===
The principal source for decisions on Jersey law are decisions of the Royal Court, which has a reputation for sound judgement.

Jersey law also draws from cases in other jurisdictions, particularly England and Wales. In criminal law, English law is drawn upon and its continuation seems to be inevitable, although in some key areas such as sentencing, Jersey has taken a distinct path from England and Wales. However, in land and succession law, English law is of little relevance. The Norman coutume is too far removed from English law for English law to be a useful tool. In contract law, English cases are cited and often followed. In trust law, English cases are a persuasive force over decision making. In tort law, English law has largely won out over French law in its influence in tort law's development in the island. However, Jersey law does sometimes decline to follow decisions of the English legal system, for example in the case of The Siskina in the House of Lords.

=== Customary law ===
Custom holds a significant position within the legal system of Jersey. It is regarded as the foundation of Jersey law and has been described as 'the product of generally accepted usage and practice'. Many rules of customary law have crystallised to such an extent (through repeated acknowledgment by the Royal Court and in the way people conduct their affairs) that everyone accepts them as binding without discussion. Examples of such rules include the boundaries of the parishes, the existence of the office of Bailiff and various rules relating to possession of land and inheritance.

Customary law has no formal, authoritative backing; it relies on 'the general consensus of opinion within the community'. This differs from English common law, in which judicial statements of a judge in a senior court establish binding laws simply because they are stated by a judge. The texts of legal 'commentators' and the case law of Jersey courts provide discussions of many customary law rules. However, where these do not adequately address a specific situation, Jersey courts examine factual evidence to work out the 'generally accepted usage and practice'.

The customary law of the Duchy of Normandy is particularly influential as a source of law in Jersey, even though Jersey ceased to part of Normandy in 1204. Norman law developed in two main epochs – the "Ancienne coutume" (1199–1538) and the "Coutume reformée" (1538–1804).

==== Ancienne coutume of Normandy ====
The northern and western regions of medieval Europe "were a patchwork of territorial areas in which the main source of law was customs, usages and practices which had become relatively fixed and settled". Norman law was based on oral tradition and repeated practices in feudal society. The earliest known written account of the Ancienne coutume of Normandy is the "Très-ancienne coutume", first set down in Latin manuscript around 1199 to 1223. It was translated into French, probably in about 1230. It is thought to be the work of scholars or court officials, designed to be a manual for legal practitioners. A modern edition was compiled from various sources in 1903 by Professor E. J. Tardiff.

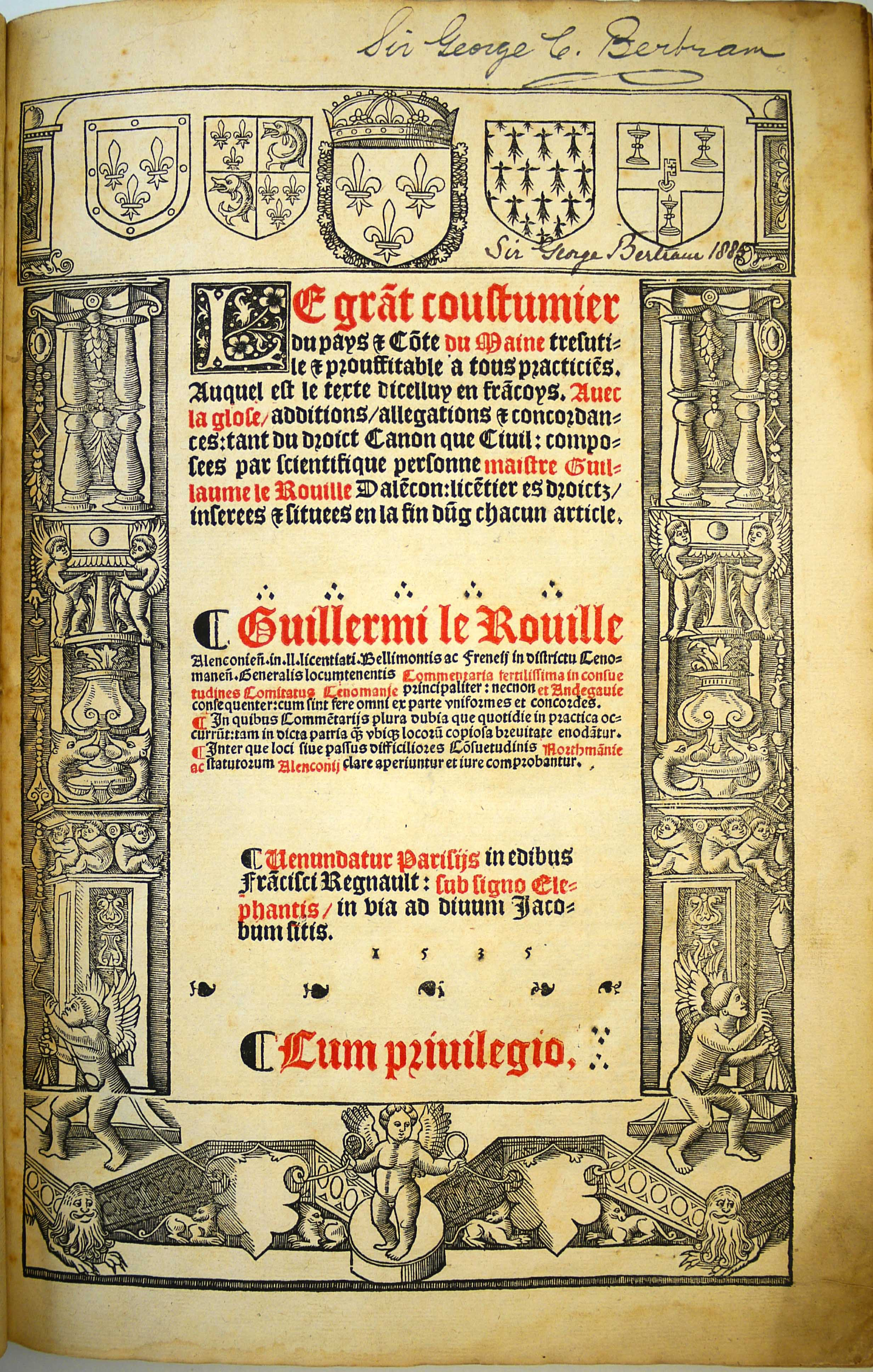
Le Rouillée's 1535 commentary on the customs of Maine

Of more importance to Jersey law is "Le Grand Coutume de Normandie" written in the period 1245–1258, originally in Latin manuscript (Summa de Legibus). The first printed version dates to 1438. It sets out the law and practice of Normandy in the form of 125 articles. It is probable that the original compiler "was an individual legal practitioner or scholar, rather than it being in any sense an official work".

When in 1309 Edward II of England sent Justices to Jersey, the people of Jersey were "asked by what law they claimed to be governed, the law of England, of Normandy, or by some special customs of their own? They answered 'By the law of Normandy, and referred the Justices to the Summa of Malcael [the Jersey name for the Grand Coutumier], where the Norman laws are well embodied' ... But they added, and this a clause that caused much trouble later, 'except that we have certain customs used in this island from time immemorial'".

In the 16th century, two commentaries on the Grand Coutumier, written in Normandy, have been influential in Jersey law. Guillaume Rouillé of Alençon (also known as Le Rouillé) was the author of Le Grant Coustumier du pays & duché de Normendie : tres utile & profitable a tous practiciens (1534; 1539). He also produced commentary on the neighbouring province of Maine (pictured).

Guillaume Terrien's Commentaires du droit civil, tant public que privé, observé au pays et Duché de Normandie was first published in 1574. Dawes explains: "Terrien's own work comprised the selecting of texts from the Grand Coutumier, putting them into an order which suited his scheme (even to the point of cutting and pasting quite disparate texts) and then commenting on the resulting amalgam. To this commentary a further author added notes headed 'Additio', more often than not in Latin".

Two modern versions of the text of the Grand Coutumier have been produced. The first was by Jurat William Laurence de Gruchy entitled L'Ancienne Coutume de Normandie: Réimpression, éditée avec de légères annotations (1881), based on Le Rouillé's 1539 edition, using a double-column format setting out the Latin and French texts side by side. In 2009, an English translation of the Latin text by J. A. Everard was published.

==== Coutume Reformée of Normandy ====
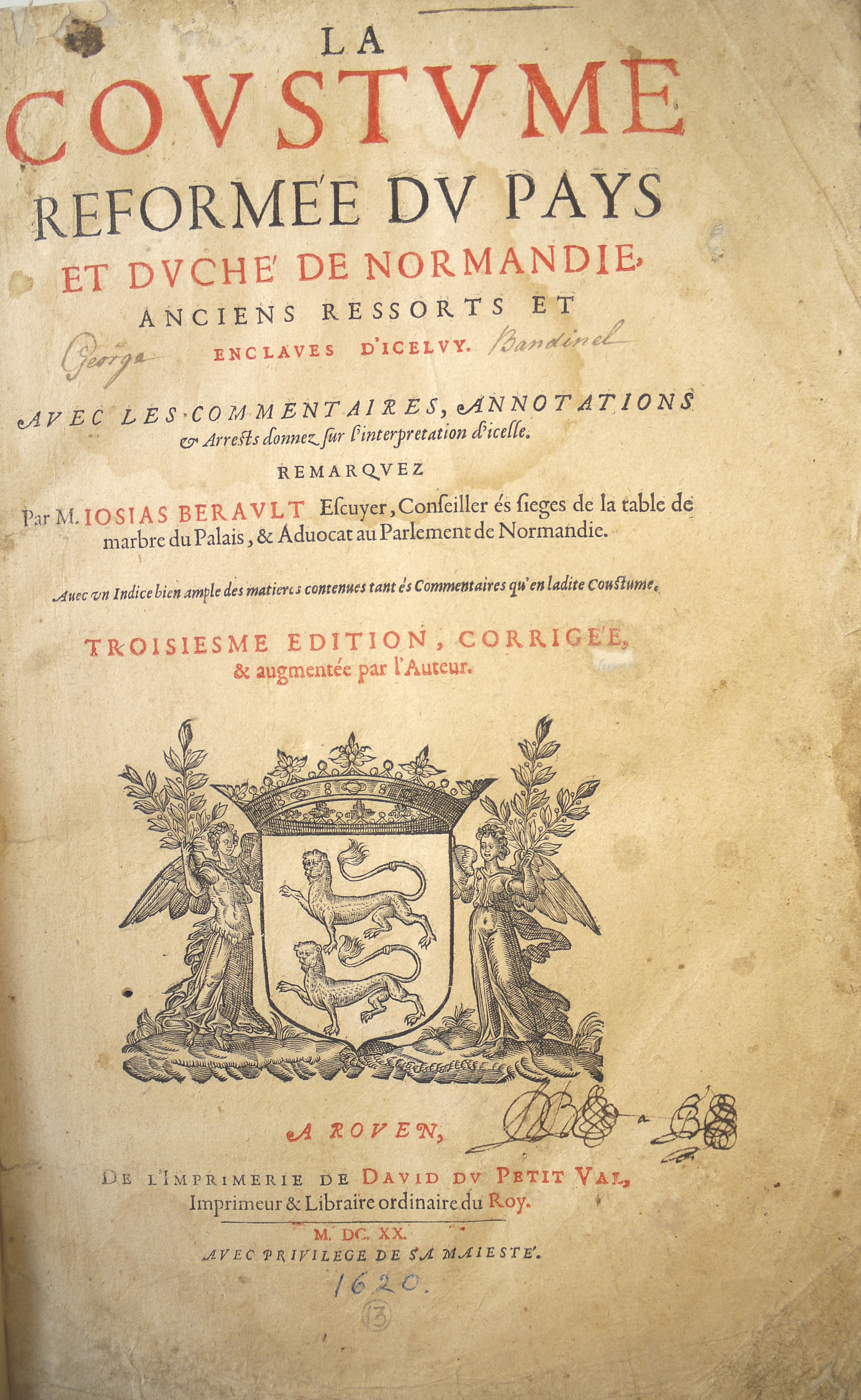
Berault's 1620 commentary

The second period in the development of Norman custom was the Coutume reformée (the reformed custom), in force between 1583 and 1804.

The reformed custom was a result of a 1453 directive of Charles VII of France. He ordered the 'redaction' of all customary laws in France, which meant they were to be set out systematically and approved under royal authority. The Duchy of Normandy was the final region to comply with this order, but eventually, a new text was prepared, which received royal approval from Henry III in 1585. In 1804, customary law was abolished in France with the introduction of uniform codes of civil and criminal law across the whole of France.

There are two reasons why the Coutume reformée might be thought to have little relevance to Jersey: it was created 380 years after Jersey had ceased to be part of the Duchy of Normandy, and it was a text sanctioned by the King of France. Nonetheless, Jersey lawyers and courts have made frequent references to the Coutume reformée and, by virtue of its assimilation into Jersey law over the centuries, it is regarded as a source of the island's law.

Commentators on the Coutume reformée include:

- Henri Basnage de Franquesnay
- Jacques Bathelier d'Aviron
- Josias Bérault
- Jean-Baptiste Flaust
- Jacques Godefroy
- David Hoüard
- Charles Routier.

==== Jersey commentators on custom ====
As well as relying on commentaries produced in France, Jersey has an indigenous legal literature on custom. In the 17th century, Jean Poingdestre (1609–1691) and Philippe Le Geyt (1635–1716) wrote several works. Some chapters of C. S. Le Gros' 20th-century work, Traité du Droit Coutumier d l'Ile de Jersey also remain relevant.

==== Legislative reforms of custom ====
Many rules of customary law have been amended or abolished by legislation in the later 19th and 20th centuries. Examples of this include:

- "Any rule of customary law, that a contract passed before the Royal Court for the transfer of immovable property may be annulled, at the instance of the heirs or devisees, as the case may be, of the transferor, if he or she dies within 40 days of the passing of the contract, is abolished" (Customary Law Amendment (No. 2) (Jersey) Law 1984).
- In customary law, the age of majority was 20 years; the Age of Majority (Jersey) Law 1999 reduces this to 18 years.
- "The rule under customary law that all gifts to a concubine are null is hereby abolished" (Wills and Successions (Jersey) Law 1993).
- Customary law did not permit a cause of action for/against a person to survive the person's death against/for the benefit of the person's estate; Customary Law Amendment (Jersey) Law 1948 reversed this situation.
- The année de jouissance (the right of an executor to have the income arising during the administration of a moveable estate for a year and a day) was abolished by the Wills and Successions (Jersey) Law 1993.

=== Influence of English and French law ===
Some fields of Jersey, such as negligence and administrative law, are heavily influenced by English common law. In other branches of law, notably contract, Jersey courts may have regard to French civil law.

=== Human rights ===
The Human Rights (Jersey) Law 2000, based closely on the United Kingdom's Human Rights Act 1998, requires Jersey courts so far as possible to interpret legislation so that it is compatible with rights and freedoms guaranteed by the European Convention on Human Rights. Jersey public authorities are required to act in conformity with Convention rights. Jersey courts have power to make a 'declaration of incompatibility' if they decide that a Law violates one of the ECHR rights. The first such declaration was granted by the Jersey Court of Appeal in April 2024.

In 2022, the States Assembly adopted the Children (Convention Rights) (Jersey) Law 2022. This 'indirectly' incorporates rights from the Convention on the Rights of the Child. It requires public office-holders to consider children's rights when they develop policies, laws and practices which impact children and young people.

== Language ==
During the 20th century, the main working language of the Jersey legal system changed from French to English. Before the 1930s, almost all legislation passed by the States Assembly was in French. Since then, French is used only where new legislation makes amendments to legislation originally drafted in French.

The conveyancing of immoveable property was carried out using contracts drafted in French until October 2006, after which contracts were required to be in English. Several French words and expressions used in Jersey differ from Standard French.

== Precedent and law reporting ==
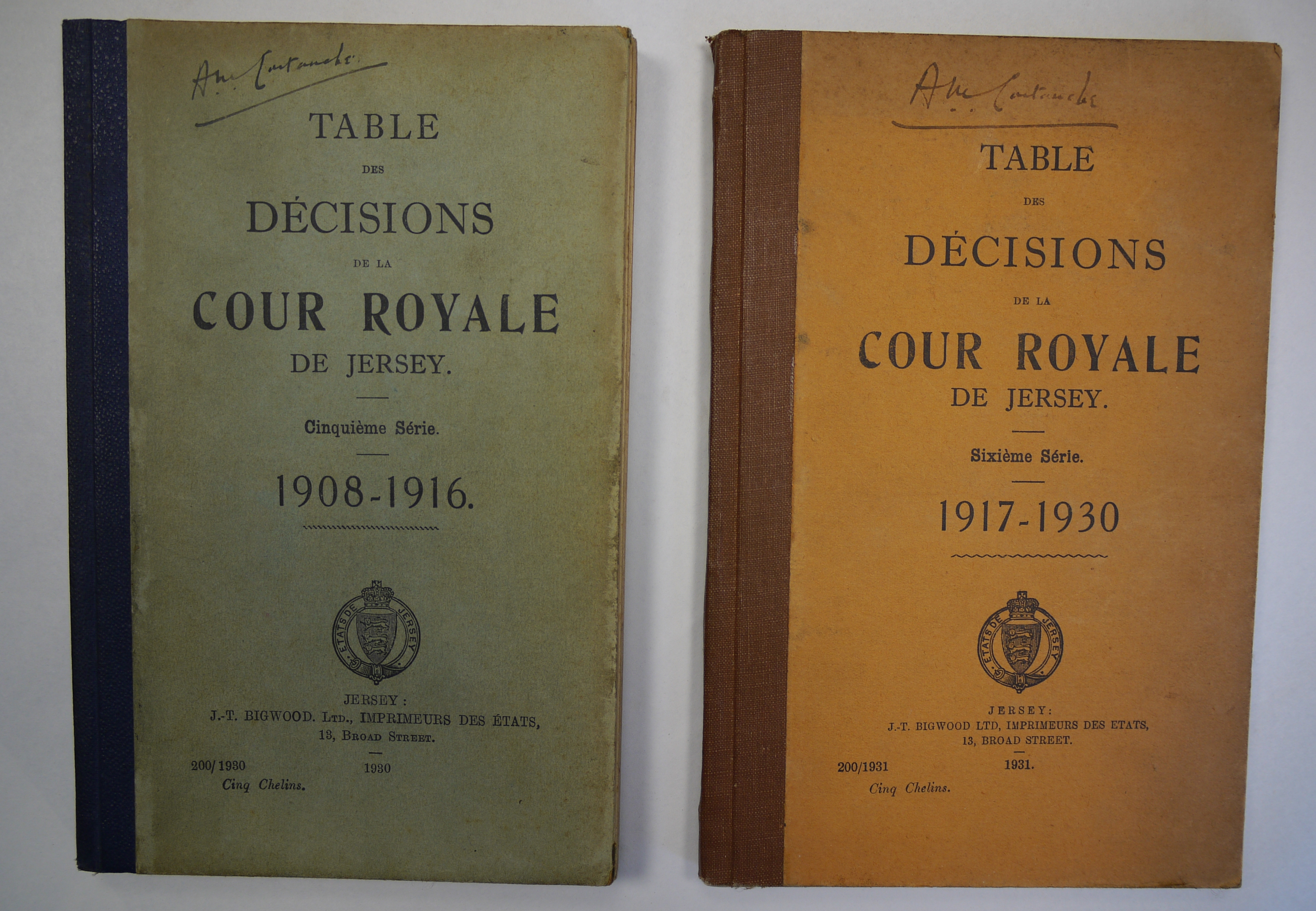
Tables de Décisions de la Cour Royal de Jersey 1885–1978

The Jersey legal system does not follow the strict rules of binding precedent that exist in common law jurisdictions, such as England and Wales, or in Guernsey, the other jurisdiction based on Norman customary law. The Royal Court is not bound by its own previous decisions on a point of law but it will generally follow them unless persuaded that the earlier decision was wrongly decided. A similar approach is taken by the Court of Appeal. All Jersey courts are, however, bound by points of law decided by the Judicial Committee of the Privy Council in previous Jersey appeals to that court.

During the 19th and 20th centuries a series of improvements to the system of writing and reporting judgments was put in place. In 1885, the Royal Court began to publish the Tables des Décisions de la Cour Royal de Jersey – a subject index to decided cases, prepared by the Greffier.

In 1950, Charles Thomas Le Quesne KC returned to Jersey from practice at the English Bar and was appointed Lieutenant Bailiff. Up to this point, the Royal Court's judgments were in the French style of jugements motivés, written in French by the Greffier rather than the judge, and expressing the reasons for the court's decision only very briefly. Le Quesne changed the language of judgments to English and adopted the common law style of judgments, where the judge gives detailed reasons for accepting or rejecting the rival submissions made at trial by counsel. Between 1950 and 1984, the Royal Court published its and the Court of Appeal judgments in a series of law reports known as the Jersey Judgments (eleven volumes in total). From 1984, judgments have been published a new series of law reports known as the Jersey Law Reports.

In 2004, the Jersey Legal Information Board (JLIB) was set up to promote "accessibility of the written law and legal processes to the public and of an integrated and efficient legal system, through the use of information technology and by other means". Judgments of the Royal Court and Court of Appeal are published online on www.jerseylaw.je, with open access to "unreported" judgments as part of the Free Access to Law Movement.

== Judiciary ==
=== Bailiff and Deputy Bailiff ===
The head of the judiciary in Jersey is the Bailiff. The Bailiff's functions may be exercised by the Deputy Bailiff.

As well as performing the judicial functions of a chief justice, the Bailiff is the President (presiding officer) of the States Assembly, civic head of the island, 'guardian of the constitution', president of the Licensing Assembly and, under customary law, must give permission for public entertainments.

The posts of Bailiff and Deputy Bailiff are Crown appointments, formally made by His Majesty the King, on advice of the UK government's Secretary of State for Justice.

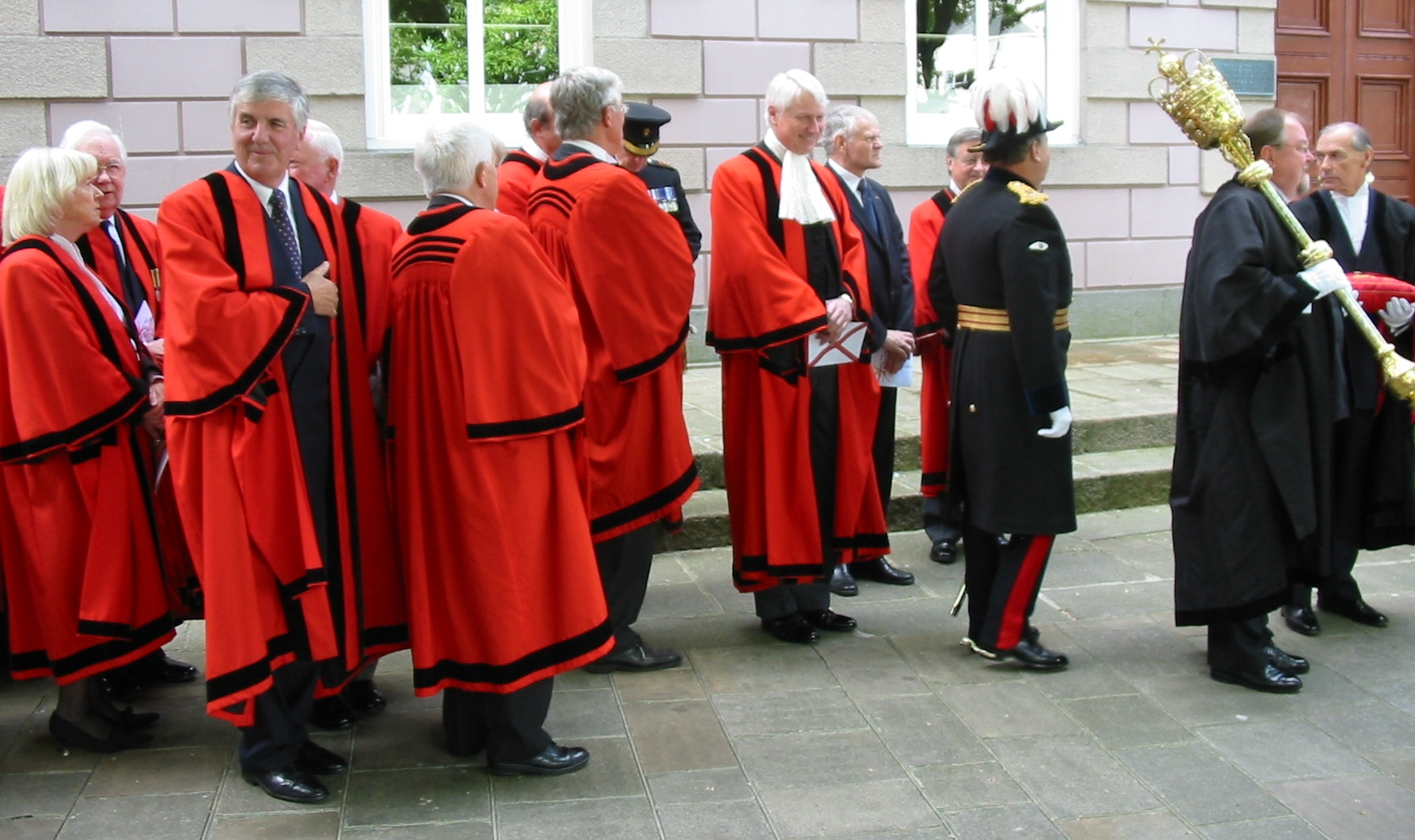
The Bailiff and Jurats outside the Royal Court in 2009

An appointment process has developed in recent years, without a legislative basis, for vacancies for the Deputy Bailiff, Attorney General for Jersey and Solicitor General for Jersey. This involves advertising for candidates and the preparation of a shortlist by a selection panel consisting of the Bailiff (in the chair), the senior Jurat and the chairman of the Jersey Appointments Commission. A process of consultation is then carried out, including the Jurats, the States Consultative Panel (which includes the Chief Minister), a number of elected members of the States Assembly, senior lawyers (the Bâtonnier, the President of the Law Society, the former President of the Law Society of Jersey and the President of the Chambre des Ecrivains), the other Crown Officers and the local Commissioners of the Royal Court. All candidates on the shortlist are then interviewed by the selection panel. A single name is then sent by the Lieutenant Governor to the Secretary of State for Justice.

This process has not been used for appointment to the office of Bailiff on the basis that "The Secretary of State has accepted that the position of Deputy Bailiff is a training ground for the position of Bailiff, and that, therefore, all things being equal, you would expect to move up, assuming of course that you have performed to everyone's satisfaction".

=== Jurats ===
As well as the Bailiff and Deputy Bailiff, the Royal Court is composed of 12 or more Jurats. Some may be designated as 'Lieutenant Bailiffs'. Until 1948, the Jurats were judges of law as well as fact. Jurats hold office until aged 72. Jurats are elected by secret ballot of an electoral college consisting of the Bailiff, the Jurats, the Connétables, the elected members of the States Assembly, advocates and solicitors of the Royal Court.

=== Commissioners ===
Commissioners of the Royal Court are appointed by the Bailiff for the hearing of a specified cause or matter or a specified term.

=== Magistrates ===
The Bailiff appoints the Magistrate and the Assistant Magistrate (who hold full-time salaried posts) and part-time Relief Magistrates (legal practitioners who carry out duties on a daily fee-paid basis). It is now normal for the Bailiff to convene a panel to advise on salaried appointments.

=== Judges of the Jersey Court of Appeal ===
The judges of the Court of Appeal comprise the Bailiff and Deputy Bailiff (though they rarely sit), the Bailiff of Guernsey, and several King's Counsel or other senior legal practitioners from the United Kingdom, the Channel Islands or the Isle of Man. Currently, there are 11 judges of the Court of Appeal, including the Bailiff of Guernsey.

== Judicial conduct and removal from office ==
All judges in Jersey are bound by a code of conduct promulgated by the Jersey Judicial Association in 2007. This requires judges to 'uphold the integrity and independence of the judiciary and perform their duties with competence, diligence and dedication'.

The Bailiff, Deputy Bailiff and members of the Jersey Court of Appeal 'hold office during good behaviour'. Whereas senior judges in England and Wales who are appointed by Crown may only be removed from office with the consent of both Houses of Parliament, the United Kingdom Secretary of State for Justice may dismiss a Jersey judge appointed by the Crown without the agreement States Assembly. This happened in 1992, when the then Deputy Bailiff Vernon Tomes was dismissed from office by the Home Secretary (the UK minister who at the time was responsible for the Crown Dependencies), at the request of the Bailiff, on grounds of his delays in producing written judgments.

Jurats hold office up to the age of 72 years. A Jurat who 'in the opinion of the Court, is permanently unable, through physical or mental incapacity, or for any other reason, efficiently to carry out the duties of the office, may be called upon by the Court to resign'. A Jurat who refuses to resign may be removed from office by Order of His Majesty in Council on the petition of the Superior Number (the Bailiff and five or more Jurats) of the Royal Court.

The Bailiff may if he 'thinks fit, terminate the appointment of a Commissioner on the ground of incapacity or misbehaviour'.

The Magistrates, who are also appointed by the Bailiff not the Crown, may not be removed from office 'except by virtue of an Order of Her Majesty in Council'. In June 2008, the Chief Minister informed the States Assembly that the Magistrate-Designate, Ian Christmas, has 'agreed not to sit as a judge following a discussion with the former Bailiff as a result of a criminal investigation into an alleged fraud'. Mr Christmas was subsequently convicted of one count of fraud and sentenced to fifteen months in prison. It has been reported that the Bailiff's Office has asked the United Kingdom Ministry of Justice to arrange for a UK judge to undertake a disciplinary investigation.

== Judicial independence in Jersey ==
All courts in Jersey are required under Article 6 of the European Convention on Human Rights to be 'independent and impartial'.

In 2000, the European Court of Human Rights held in McGonnell v United Kingdom that there was a breach of Article 6 in Guernsey where the Bailiff or Deputy Bailiff sat as President of the States of Guernsey when proposed legislation was being debated and then subsequently sat as a judge of the Royal Court of Guernsey in a case where that legislation was relevant. The Court, noting that there was no suggestion that the Bailiff 'was subjectively biased', stated that the 'mere fact' that this happened was capable of casting doubt on the Bailiff's impartiality.

A Bailiff and Deputy Bailiff in Jersey is able to avoid a McGonnell situation simply by not sitting in the Royal Court in cases concerned with legislation that was debated when he presided in the States. In 2009, the then Bailiff, Mr Michael Birt conceded that 'we probably need to improve our systems to be very compliant with McGonnell and that one probably ought to keep a running list of those statutes where I have presided so at least I could invite the parties to consider whether they wanted to object or not'.

In the 2009 review chaired by Lord Carswell, set up by the States Assembly, a legal opinion was commissioned from Rabinder Singh QC in which he expressed the view that 'there is no reason in law why the present constitutional arrangements in respect of the Bailiff should be altered. However, the trend suggests that the tide of history is in favour of reform and that the legal position will be different in 10 years time'. Lord Carswell concluded that Mr Singh's opinion 'provides an additional reason why the Bailiff should cease to be the President of the States'.

The States of Jersey have not accepted this aspect of the Carswell report. Many prominent islanders do not believe that any change is necessary or desirable.

== Jersey legal profession ==
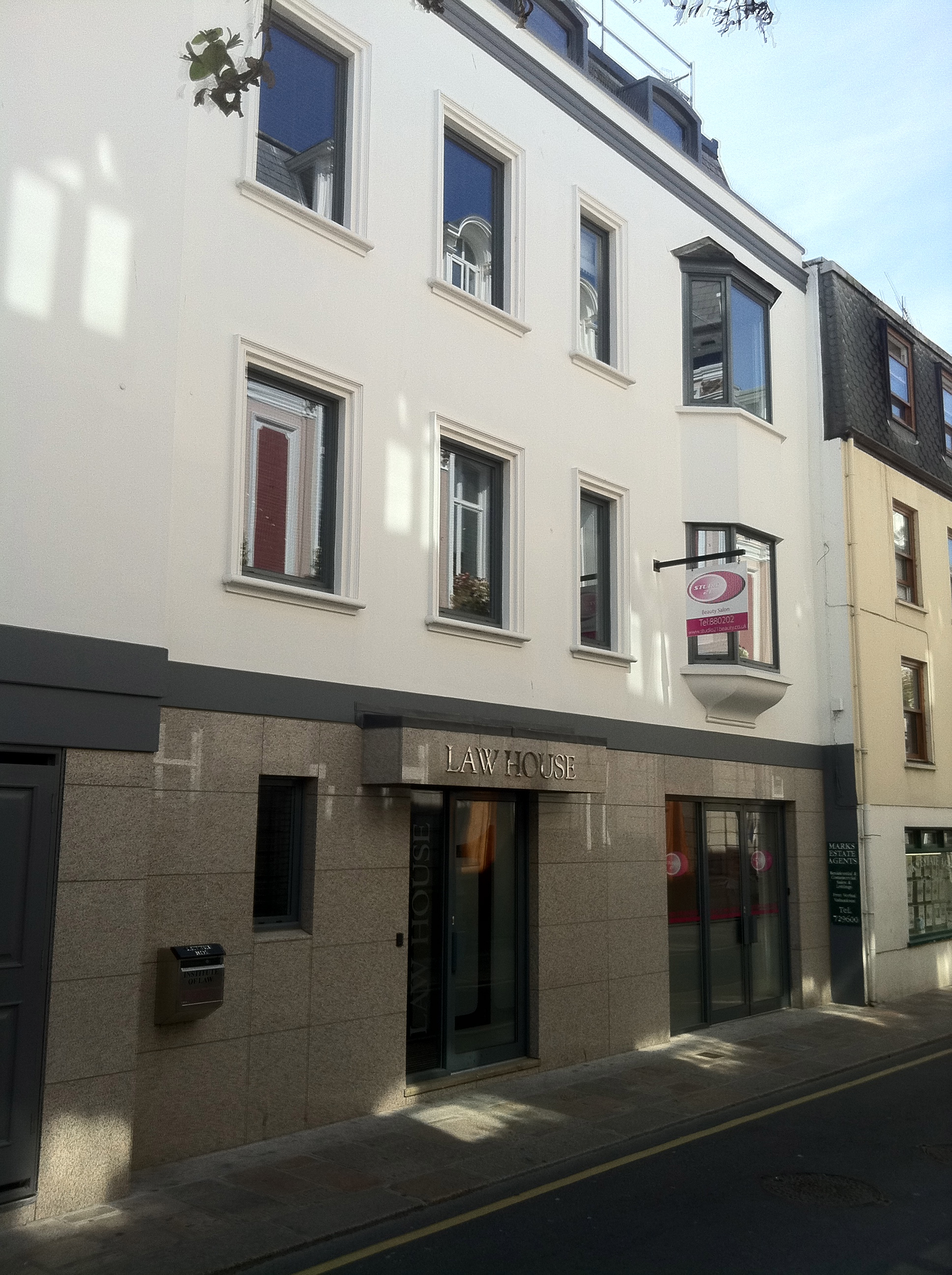
Former premises of the Institute of Law, Seale Street, St Helier

The Jersey legal profession has three types of Jersey-qualified lawyers:

- Advocates, who have rights of audience to represent clients in all courts.
- Solicitors, who have no general rights of audience.
- notaries public, who have no rights of audience.

The Law Society of Jersey is the professional body responsible for professional conduct of Advocates and Solicitors. Notaries are regulated by the Faculty Office of the Archbishop of Canterbury through the Dean of the Arches, referred to as the Master of the Faculties, who is normally an English KC.

Some law firms focus on legal practice relating to Jersey's finance industry, the largest being: Appleby; Bedell Cristin; Carey Olsen; Mourant Ozannes; and Ogier, all of which are regarded as part of the "offshore magic circle". Smaller firms and sole practitioners also provide a wide range of legal services. Several law firms now have offices in both Jersey and Guernsey but the legal professions of the two islands are separate, as they are separate from those in England, Wales and Scotland. Most notaries in Jersey are employed by, or are partners in, local firms of Jersey advocates or solicitors, although some are in English solicitors firms or practising purely as notaries, independent of the general legal profession. There is a local Jersey Notaries Society.

=== Qualification process ===
The process of qualifying as a Jersey lawyer is regulated by the Advocates and Solicitors (Jersey) Law 1997 and is similar for both advocates and solicitors. Since 2009, candidates for the Jersey law examinations are required to enrol on the Jersey Law Course run by the Institute of Law, Jersey.

They are required to take five compulsory papers:

- Jersey legal system and constitutional Law
- Law of contract and the law relating to security on moveable property and bankruptcy
- testate and intestate succession; law of immoveable property and conveyancing; and civil and criminal procedure

In addition, candidates must take one of three option papers:

- company law
- trusts law
- family law

The admission of lawyers as notaries in Jersey is governed by an order of the Master of the Faculties. It is necessary to show that a prospective notary has been in actual practise in Jersey as a Jersey-qualified Advocate or Solicitor for a period of 5 years and is required to pass an examination in notarial practice. The Master does however retain a discretion to admit those who are not so qualified "...in appropriate circumstances".

=== Law Officers of the Crown ===
The Law Officers of the Crown are responsible for criminal prosecution work and for providing legal advice to the Crown, ministers and other members of the States Assembly. The Attorney General and his deputy, the Solicitor General, are non-voting members of the States Assembly.

== Legal aid ==
Under the Access to Justice (Jersey) Law 2019, the Minister for Justice and Home Affairs must consult and then publish a legal aid scheme. A new legal aid system started in April 2022.

- Government-funded legal aid is available for criminal and public law cases. A specialist lawyer from an accredited panel can be chosen by the person seeking help with criminal, mental health, and human rights cases.
- For private and civil cases, there is no government funding. Legal aid is provided by the legal profession for some types of case, through reduced fees or pro bono work.

The Judicial Greffier is responsible for administering the scheme, but has delegated its operation to the Law Society of Jersey, which runs it through an entity called Legal Aid Jersey.

== Law reform ==
The Jersey Law Commission was established by the States Assembly in 1996 to keep Jersey law under review and bring forward proposals for law reform.

== See also ==
- Courts of Jersey
- List of members of the judiciary of Jersey
- Order of Justice
- Politics of Jersey
- List of laws of Jersey
- Royal charters applying to the Channel Islands
