= Bailiff (Channel Islands) =

Chief Justice in each of the Channel Island bailiwicks

The Bailiff is the chief justice in each of the Channel Island bailiwicks of Guernsey and Jersey, also serving as president of the legislature and having ceremonial and executive functions. Each bailiwick has possessed its own bailiff since the islands were divided into two jurisdictions in the 13th century. The bailiffs and deputy bailiffs are appointed by the Crown on the advice of the Secretary of State for Justice (not by the governments or legislatures of the islands) and may hold office until retirement age (65 in Guernsey, 70 in Jersey).

== Name ==
After 1212, the King of England appointed a custodian to manage the Crown's affairs in the Channel Islands. At this time, there was no distinction between Warden/Governor and Bailiff, as evolved in later centuries. Officeholder Philip de Aubigné styled his role in 1218 as ballivus insularum, ballivus being the Latin term for a person who looked after the interests of a Lord. With this meaning, ballivus could be translated to the English word 'Warden', by which the office is normally called today and became officially known after 1259.

The Warden was normally absent from the island, only regularly visiting for the triennial assize. Therefore, the Warden's quotidian duties would have been carried out by a team of deputies, who were islanders and who became referred to as the ballivi. As such, one or more ballivi. By the end of the 13th century, the modern position of Bailiff appears in record, emerging from this position of ballivus.

== Roles of the bailiffs ==
Originally, the bailiff was both legislator and judge, but the position has become increasingly concentrated on the judicial functions. The bailiff presides in the main trial court in his island – the Royal Court of Jersey and the Royal Court of Guernsey, where they sit with Jurats, elected lay judges responsible for making finds of fact. The bailiff of each island is also a member of the court of appeal in his island, and that of the other.

The bailiffs are the presidents (presiding officers) of the legislatures—the States of Jersey Assembly and the States of Deliberation in Guernsey.

Constitutional changes introduced in Jersey (2005) and Guernsey (2004) created posts of chief minister and in Jersey (but not in Guernsey) created a ministerial system of government. This has altered the executive functions of the bailiffs but they continue to have a residual executive role (for example, they see any correspondence between the chief minister of their island and the UK government and may be involved in any political decisions affecting the constitutional relationship between the islands and the United Kingdom). Each bailiff continues to be the 'first citizen' of the island, carrying out civil and ceremonial roles.

The last lay (that is, not legally-qualified) Bailiff in either jurisdiction was Sir Edgar McCulloch, Bailiff of Guernsey, who served in the role from 1884 to 1895. By constitutional convention he or she (though to date there have been no women holders of the office) and the deputy bailiff are now invariably selected from among those who have previously held the senior office within the Law Officers of the Crown–the Procureur in Guernsey and the Attorney General in Jersey. Bailiffs and deputy bailiffs in modern times have also invariably been qualified as advocates in their respective islands.

A deputy bailiff in each bailiwick may preside in the Royal Court and States chamber when the bailiff is not available. Senior jurats may be appointed as lieutenant-bailiffs to perform some ceremonial duties in lieu of the bailiff on occasion as well as presiding over judicial proceedings generally of an administrative nature.

In 1617 a Privy Council decision clarified the division of civil and military responsibilities between the bailiffs and the lieutenant governors in Guernsey and Jersey. For the first time, the Crown laid down the bailiff's precedence over the governor in judicial affairs and in the States chamber.

== Bailiff of Guernsey ==
The Bailiff of Guernsey was less clearly delineated as to separation of legislative or administrative and judicial functions than that of the Bailiff of Jersey. He was head of the administration in Guernsey and used to preside over a number of States committees.

In 2000, the European Court of Human Rights held in McGonnell v. United Kingdom that there was a breach of Article 6 in Guernsey where the Bailiff or Deputy Bailiff sat as president of the States of Guernsey when proposed legislation was being debated and then subsequently sat as a judge of the Royal Court of Guernsey in a case where that legislation was relevant. The court, noting that there was no suggestion that the Bailiff 'was subjectively biased', stated that the 'mere fact' that this happened was capable of casting doubt on the Bailiff's impartiality.

The Bailiff remains civil head of the island, as well as head of the judiciary, the Presiding Officer of the States of Deliberation'.

The Bailiff is ex officio, a Judge of the Court of Appeal and its president. The Bailiff represents Guernsey as civic head of the community in and outside the Island, on occasions of a non-political nature and will greet and welcome members of the Royal Family and dignitaries visiting the Island on behalf of the people of Guernsey. May be appointed as a member of the Court of Appeal of Jersey.

== Bailiff of Jersey ==
The Bailiff of Jersey (French: Bailli de Jersey, Jèrriais: Bailli d'Jèrri) is the chief justice of the island and the presiding officer of the States Assembly.

The position of bailiff was created shortly after the Treaty of Paris 1259 in which the King of England, Henry III, gave up claim to all of the Duchy of Normandy but the Channel Islands. Rather than absorb the islands into the Kingdom of England, a warden (now lieutenant governor) and bailiff were appointed to run the island on his behalf.

=== Current roles ===
The modern-day roles of the bailiff are as follows:

- Chief judge
- President of the States Assembly, carrying out functions of a presiding officer
- Civic head of the Bailiwick of Jersey
- Guardian of the constitution
- President of the Licensing Assembly, regulating alcohol sales
- Must give permission for certain types of public entertainment to take place.

== See also ==
- Bailiff
- Courts of Jersey
- Judge of Alderney
- Law of Jersey
- List of bailiffs of Guernsey
- Bailiff of Jersey
- States of Guernsey
- States of Jersey
