= List of laws of Jersey =

Jersey, one of the Channel Islands, is a self-governing Crown dependency with its own legal system. Laws are passed and amended by the elected parliament, the States Assembly.

== 21st century ==
=== 2001–2010 ===
==== 2003 ====
- Advocates And Solicitors (Amendment No. 3) (Jersey) Law 2003 L-24-2003
- Civil Evidence (Jersey) Law 2003 L-14-2003
- Crime (Going Equipped) (Jersey) Law 2003 L-10-2003
- Crime And Security (Jersey) Law 2003 L-32-2003
- Criminal Justice (Suspension Of Prison Sentences) (Jersey) Law 2003 L-44-2003
- Customs And Excise (Amendment) (Jersey) Law 2003 L-25-2003
- Dogs (Amendment No. 2) (Jersey) Law 2003 L-15-2003
- Employment (Jersey) Law 2003 L-42-2003
- Family Allowances (Amendment No. 6) (Jersey) Law 2003 L-26-2003
- Finance (Jersey) Law 2003 L-21-2003
- Fire Service (Amendment No. 5) (Jersey) Law 2003 L-27-2003
- Health Insurance (Amendment No. 13) (Jersey) Law 2003 L-28-2003
- Income Tax (Amendment No. 22) (Jersey) Law 2003 L-22-2003
- Insurance Business (Amendment No. 4) (Jersey) Law 2003 L-09-2003
- Interpretation (Amendment) (Jersey) Law 2003 L-16-2003
- Investigation Of Fraud (Amendment No. 2) (Jersey) Law 2003 L-33-2003
- Jersey Advisory And Conciliation (Jersey) Law 2003 L-11-2003
- Jersey Association For Mental Health And Jersey Schizophrenia Fellowship (Integration With Jersey Focus On Mental Health) (Jersey) Law 2003 L-34-2003
- Law Granting An Act Of Incorporation To The Association Called "The Haut De La Garenne Trust" L-01-2003
- Law Reform (Miscellaneous Provisions) (Jersey) Law 2003 L-02-2003
- Law Revision (Jersey) Law 2003 L-35-2003
- Loi (2003) (Amendement) Au Sujet Des Centeniers Et Officiers De Police L-19-2003
- Matrimonial Causes (Amendment No. 11) (Jersey) Law 2003 L-43-2003
- Misuse Of Drugs (Amendment No. 3) (Jersey) Law 2003 L-12-2003
- Motor Traffic (Third Party Insurance) (Amendment No. 11) (Jersey) Law 2003 L-36-2003
- Motor Vehicle Registration (Amendment No. 2) (Jersey) Law 2003 L-37-2003
- Nursing And Residential Homes (Amendment) (Jersey) Law 2003 L-03-2003
- Official Publications (Amendment) (Jersey) Law 2003 L-17-2003
- Opticians (Registration) (Amendment) (Jersey) Law 2003 L-38-2003
- Parish Rate (Administration) (Amendment) (Jersey) Law 2003 L-29-2003
- Parish Rate (Administration) (Jersey) Law 2003 L-18-2003
- Parish Rate (Jersey) Law 2003 L-04-2003
- Parish Rate (No. 2) (Jersey) Law 2003 L-39-2003
- Plant Health (Jersey) Law 2003 L-30-2003
- Police Force (Amendment No. 9) (Jersey) Law 2003 L-31-2003
- Police Procedures And Criminal Evidence (Jersey) Law 2003 L-05-2003
- Public Elections (Amendment) (Jersey) Law 2003 L-20-2003
- Public Finances (Administration) (Amendment No. 11) (Jersey) Law 2003 L-06-2003
- Public Holidays And Bank Holidays (Amendment No. 2) (Jersey) Law 2003 L-07-2003
- Shipping (Amendment) (Jersey) Law 2003 L-40-2003
- Subordinate Legislation (Amendment No. 3) (Jersey) Law 2003 L-13-2003
- The Immigration And Asylum Act 1999 (Jersey) Order 2003 Oinc-23-2003
- Water (Amendment No. 2) (Jersey) Law 2003 L-41-2003
- Water Pollution (Amendment) (Jersey) Law 2003 L-08-2003

==== 2004 ====
- Agricultural Marketing (Amendment No. 7) (Jersey) Law 2004 L-04-2004
- Animal Welfare (Jersey) Law 2004 L-27-2004
- Banking Business (Amendment No. 4) (Jersey) Law 2004 L-16-2004
- Burials And Exhumations (Jersey) Law 2004 L-22-2004
- Christmas Bonus (Amendment No. 2) (Jersey) Law 2004 L-29-2004
- Customs And Excise (Amendment No. 2) (Jersey) Law 2004 L-12-2004
- Extradition (Jersey) Law 2004 L-24-2004
- Finance (Jersey) Law 2004 L-13-2004
- Hire Cars (Repeal) (Jersey) Law 2004 L-05-2004
- Honorary Police (Parochial Domicile) (Amendment) (Jersey) Law 2004 L-18-2004
- Housing (Amendment No. 11) (Jersey) Law 2004 L-15-2004
- Income Tax (Amendment No. 23) (Jersey) Law 2004 L-20-2004
- Jersey Legal Information Board (Incorporation) Law 2004 L-17-2004
- Loi (2004) (Amendement No. 10) Reglant La Procedure Criminelle L-14-2004
- Mental Health (Amendment) (Jersey) Law 2004 L-08-2004
- Motor Vehicle Registration (Amendment No. 3) (Jersey) Law 2004 L-10-2004
- Non-Contributory Pensions (Repeal) (Jersey) Law 2004 L-25-2004
- Nursing And Residential Homes (Amendment No. 2) (Jersey) Law 2004 L-30-2004
- Police Force (Amendment No. 10) (Jersey) Law 2004 L-09-2004
- Postal Services (Jersey) Law 2004 L-26-2004
- Prison (Amendment No. 5) (Jersey) Law 2004 L-21-2004
- Privileges And Immunities (Diplomatic, Consular, Etc.) (Amendment) (Jersey) Law 2004 L-19-2004
- Protection Of Children (Amendment No. 3) (Jersey) Law 2004 L-06-2004
- Social Security (Amendment No. 17) (Jersey) Law 2004 L-23-2004
- Taxation (Implementation) (Jersey) Law 2004 L-28-2004
- The Broadcasting (Jersey) Order 2003 OinC-02-2004
- The Broadcasting And Communications (Jersey) Order 2004 L-07-2004
- The Communications (Jersey) Order 2003 OinC-03-2004
- The Nuclear Safeguards (Jersey) Order 2004 OinC-11-2004
- The Wireless Telegraphy (Jersey) Order 2003 OinC-01-2004

==== 2005 ====
- Bankruptcy (Netting, Contractual Subordination And Non-Petition Provisions) (Jersey) Law 2005 L-19-2005
- Child Abduction And Custody (Jersey) Law 2005 L-29-2005
- Child Custody (Jurisdiction) (Jersey) Law 2005 L-28-2005
- Children And Day Care (Amendment) (Jersey) Law 2005 L-36-2005
- Companies (Amendment No. 8) (Jersey) Law 2005 L-37-2005
- Competition (Jersey) Law 2005 L-06-2005
- Criminal Justice (Mandatory Minimum Periods Of Actual Imprisonment) (Jersey) Law 2005 L-11-2005
- Criminal Law (Child Abduction) (Jersey) Law 2005 L-27-2005
- Data Protection (Jersey) Law 2005 L-02-2005
- Data Protection (Amendment) (Jersey) Law 2005 L-16-2005
- Diseases Of Animals (Amendment No. 6) (Jersey) Law 2005 L-30-2005
- Drainage (Jersey) Law 2005 L-03-2005
- Education (Amendment) (Jersey) Law 2005 L-31-2005
- Employment (Amendment) (Jersey) Law 2005 L-39-2005
- Employment Of States Of Jersey Employees (Jersey) Law 2005 L-26-2005
- Fertilisers And Feeding Stuffs (Amendment) (Jersey) Law 2005 L-20-2005
- Finance (Jersey) Law 2005 L-13-2005
- Financial Services (Amendment No. 2) (Jersey) Law 2005 L-01-2005
- Income Tax (Amendment No. 24) (Jersey) Law 2005 L-12-2005
- Island Planning (Amendment No. 9) (Jersey) Law 2005 L-34-2005
- Jersey Overseas Aid Commission (Jersey) Law 2005 L-24-2005
- Liquor (Restrictions On Consumption) (Jersey) Law 2005 L-38-2005
- Loi (2005) (Amendement No. 5) Sur La Propriété Foncière L-23-2005
- Medicines (Amendment No. 2) (Jersey) Law 2005 L-10-2005
- Planning And Building (Amendment) (Jersey) Law 2005 L-18-2005
- Planning And Building (Amendment No. 2) (Jersey) Law 2005 L-25-2005
- Planning And Building (Amendment No. 3) (Jersey) Law 2005 L-35-2005
- Public Employees (Retirement) (Validation And Amendment) (Jersey) Law 2005 L-04-2005
- Public Finances (Jersey) Law 2005 L-14-2005
- Rates (Jersey) Law 2005 L-33-2005
- Regulation Of Investigatory Powers (Jersey) Law 2005 L-17-2005
- Road Traffic (Amendment No. 3) (Jersey) Law 2005 L-05-2005
- Royal Court (Amendment No. 11) (Jersey) Law 2005 L-15-2005
- Social Security (Amendment No. 18) (Jersey) Law 2005 L-32-2005
- States Of Jersey Law 2005 L-08-2005
- States Of Jersey (Amendment) Law 2005 L-22-2005
- Termination Of Pregnancy (Amendment) (Jersey) Law 2005 L-21-2005
- The Law Society of Jersey Law 2005 L-09-2005
- Waste Management (Jersey) Law 2005 L-07-2005

==== 2006 ====
- Animal Welfare (Amendment) (Jersey) Law 2006 L-07-2006
- Emergency Powers and Planning (Amendment No. 2) (Jersey) Law 2006 L-09-2006
- Highways (Amendment No. 4) (Jersey) Law 2006 L-08-2006
- Housing (Amendment No. 12) (Jersey) Law 2006 L-05-2006
- Law Revision (Amendment) (Jersey) Law 2006
- Law Revision (Miscellaneous Provisions) (Jersey) Law 2006 L-06-2006
- Petroleum (Amendment No. 2) (Jersey) Law 2006 L-04-2006
- Public Finances (Amendment) (Jersey) Law 2006 L-03-2006
- Restriction On Smoking (Amendment) (Jersey) Law 2006 L-01-2006
- States of Jersey (Amendment No. 2) Law 2006 L-02-2006
- Terrorism (Amendment) (Jersey) Law 2006
