= Carey Olsen =

Offshore magic circle law firm

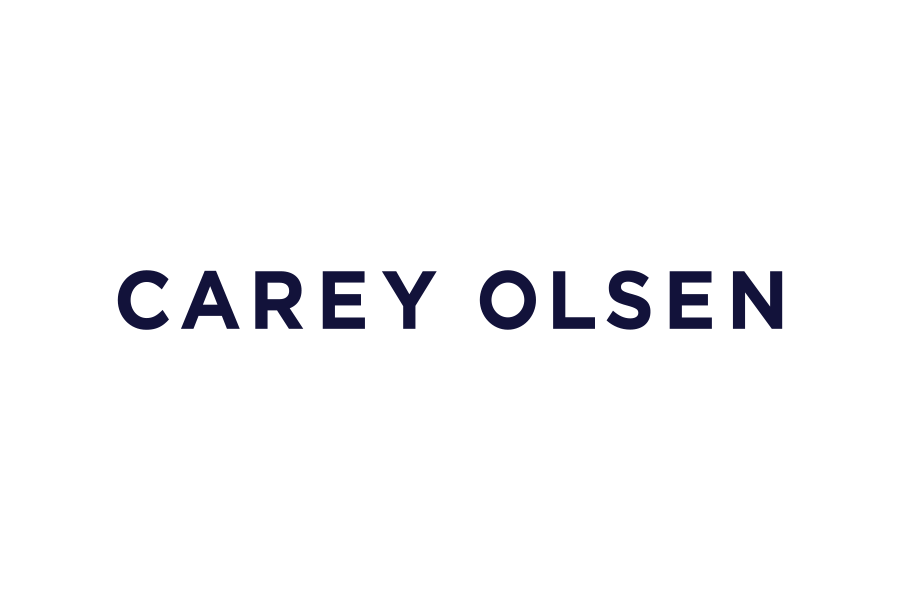
- Industry: Legal services
- Founded: 2003
- Headquarters: St Helier, Jersey
- Number of employees: 450+ (2020)
- Website: www.careyolsen.com

Carey Olsen is an offshore law firm with offices in Bermuda, the British Virgin Islands, Cape Town, Cayman Islands, Guernsey, Jersey, London, Hong Kong and Singapore advising on Bermuda, British Virgin Islands, Cayman Islands, Guernsey and Jersey law.

The firm employs more than 650 people and its 80-plus partners head up a total complement of more than 300 lawyers. It provides legal services in relation to all areas of banking and finance, corporate and M&A, investment funds and private equity, trusts and private wealth, dispute resolution, insolvency and property law.

Carey Olsen works with clients including global financial institutions, investment funds, private equity houses, multi-national corporations, public organisations, sovereign wealth funds, ultra high net worth individuals, family offices, directors, trustees and private clients. It also routinely works alongside all of the major onshore law firms, accountancy firms and insolvency practitioners on corporate transactions and matters involving its jurisdictions.

== History ==
Carey Olsen was formed in 2003 following the merger between two prominent Channel Island firms, Carey Langlois in Guernsey and Olsens in Jersey. The former had roots dating back to 1898 while Olsens was, at the time, a relative newcomer having been started in 1981 by Advocate Anthony Olsen.

== Offices ==
- Bermuda
- British Virgin Islands (since 2013)
- Cape Town
- Cayman Islands
- Guernsey
- Hong Kong
- Jersey
- London
- Singapore

== Rankings ==
The Corporate Advisers Rankings Guide places Carey Olsen in the top five law firms by the number of London Stock Exchange (LSE) and AIM clients it advises. It is the only offshore law firm to be ranked alongside UK legal advisers in the top five.
