= Ogier (law firm) =

Offshore magic circle law firm

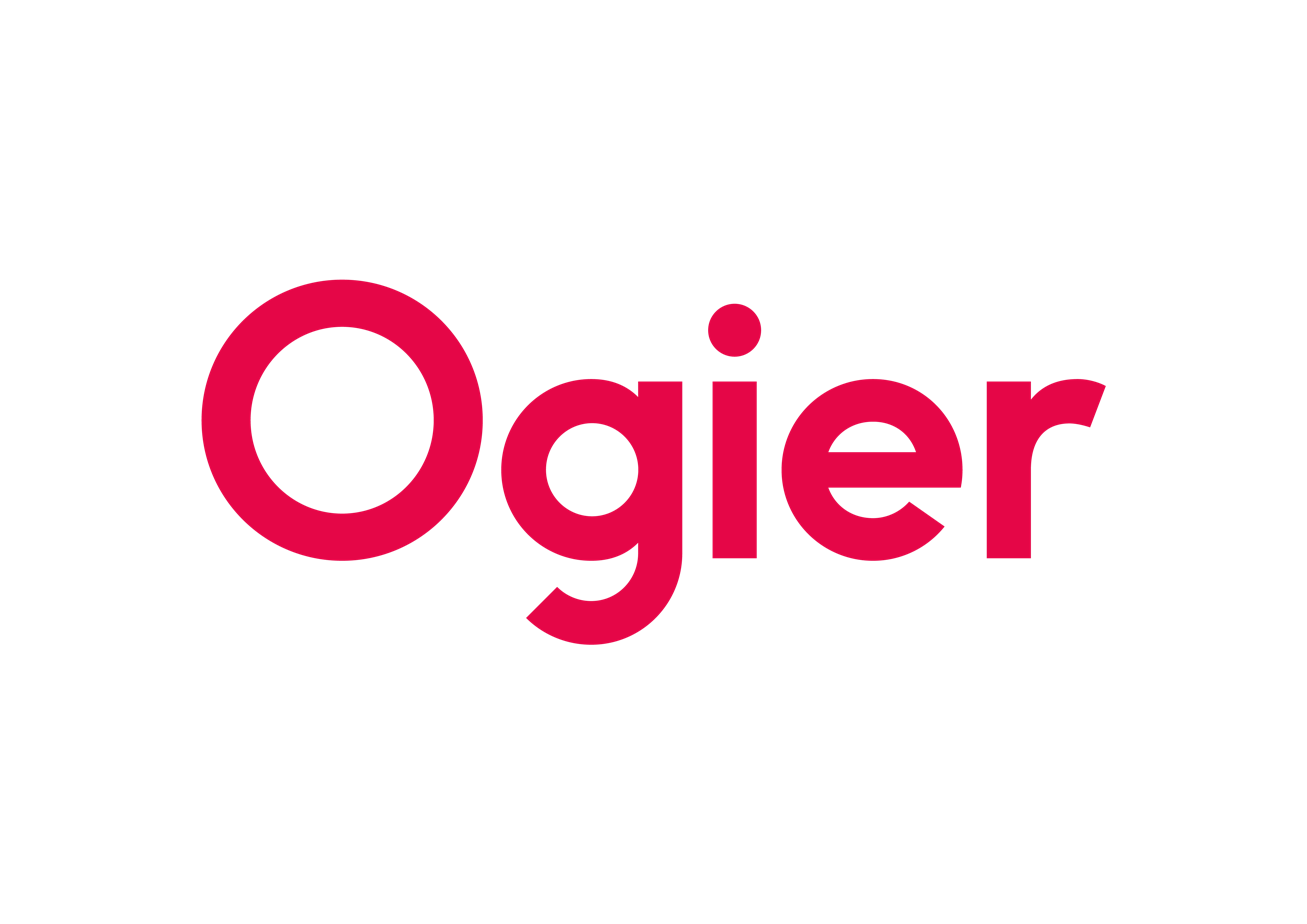
- Headquarters: St Helier, Jersey
- No. of offices: 12
- Date founded: 1867
- Company type: Partnership
- Website: http://www.ogier.com/

Ogier is a law firm with offices in the BVI, the Cayman Islands, Guernsey, Ireland, Jersey and Luxembourg. It is a member of the offshore magic circle.

== History ==
John Francis Giffard began practicing law in St Helier, Jersey in 1867. His practice was joined by William Smyth Le Masurier in 1905. A partnership between Advocate Leonce L’Hermite Ogier and John Gleury Le Cornu is formed in 1922. Philip Antonio Poch was made partner alongside Le Masurier and Gifford to form Le Masurier Giffard & Poch in 1932.

The two law firms of Le Masurier Giffard & Poch and Ogier & Le Cornu merged to create the Ogier Group in 1995. Ogier created the first trans-Atlantic offshore law firm when it merged with Boxalls in Cayman in 2004. Ogier & Le Masurier became Ogier in 2005. Ogier merged with WSmith based in BVI and Hong Kong in 2007. Ogier opened an office in Shanghai in 2011, making it the first offshore law firm to operate out of mainland China. In 2012 Ogier became the first offshore law firm to open an office in Luxembourg. Ogier Fiduciary Services opened an office in Luxembourg in 2013.

Management Buy-out of Ogier Fiduciary Services occurred in 2014. Ogier launched Dispute Resolution into Hong Kong in 2014.

In 2015 Ogier launched new brand identity focused on law. Ogier launched Ogier Global to create an integrated corporate administration team in 2017. Ogier launched Singapore office in 2021. Ogier launched its Beijing office in 2022.

In 2022 Ogier merged with Irish law firm, Leman Solicitors, to form Ogier Leman.

== Offices ==
Ogier has offices based in Beijing, British Virgin Islands, Cayman, Guernsey, Hong Kong, Ireland, Jersey, London, Luxembourg, Shanghai, Singapore and Tokyo.
