= Courts of Jersey =

Court in the Channel Island of Jersey

The Courts of Jersey are responsible for the administration of justice in the Bailiwick of Jersey, one of the Channel Islands. They apply the law of the Island, which is a mixture of customary law and legislation passed by the legislature, the States Assembly.

The principal court is the Royal Court, which has been in existence since the 13th century, and exercises both civil and criminal jurisdiction. Additional courts, such as the Magistrate's Court, which deals with minor criminal matters, and the Court of Appeal, which hears appeals from the Royal Court, have been added to the Island's legal system more recently. There are also a number of specialist tribunals.

== Appeal courts ==
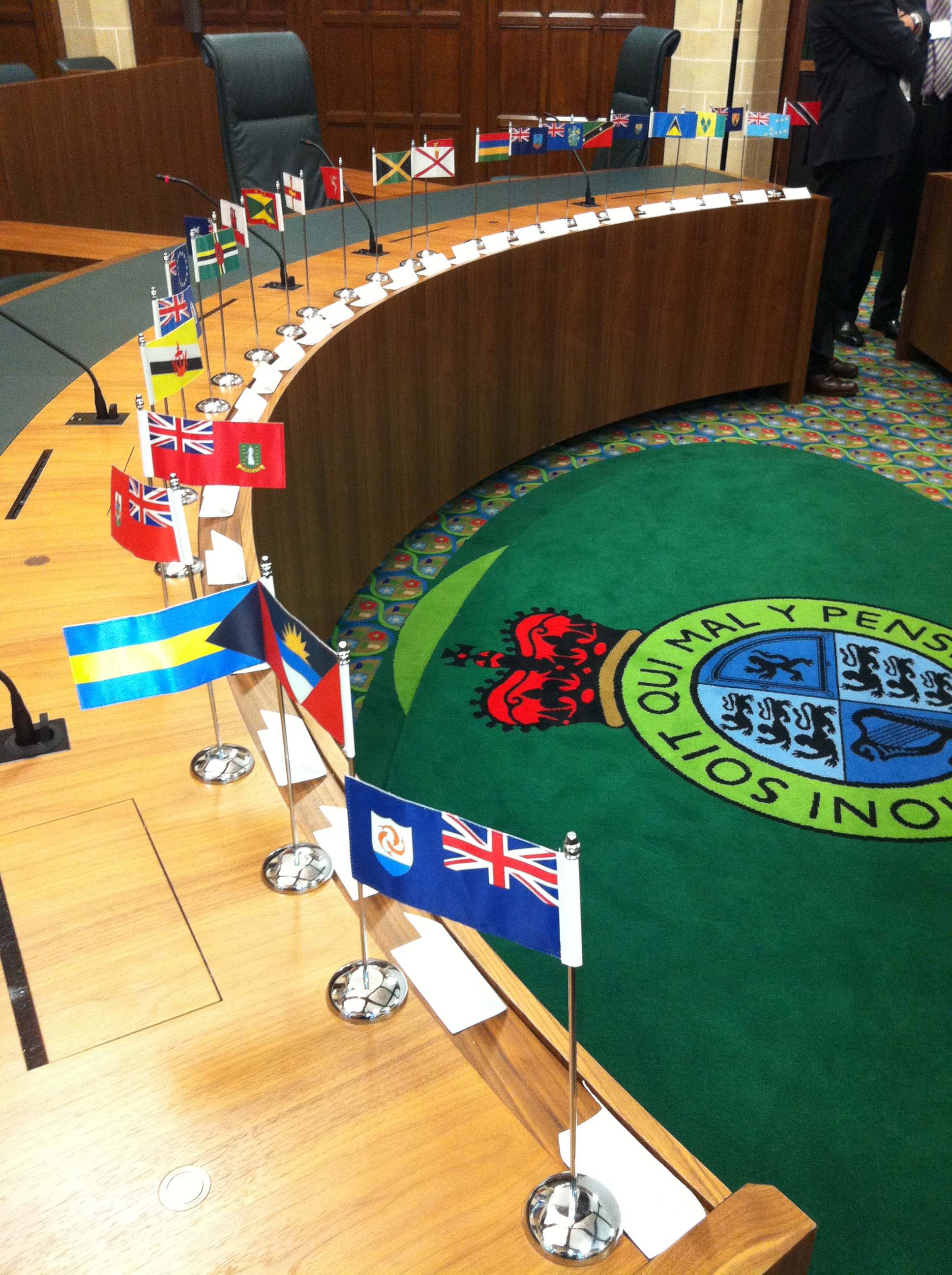
Judicial Committee of the Privy Council, court 3 in Middlesex Guildhall, the UK Supreme Court Building in London

Prior to 1949 there was no appellate court in Jersey (or Guernsey). Appeals could be heard by the Judicial Committee of the Privy Council, but this was only possible if special leave was given and was not by right. It was felt that, particularly in criminal cases, this was not satisfactory. Therefore, an Order in Council, the Court of Appeal (Channel Islands) Order 1949 was made by King George VI creating the Channel Islands Court of Appeal, to deal with appeals from both Jersey and Guernsey. However it was soon realised that a joint court would not work and the Channel Islands Court of Appeal never sat. It was ultimately replaced by separate Courts of Appeal in each of the two bailiwicks.

=== The Court of Appeal ===
The Court of Appeal of Jersey was finally created in 1961 and sits about six times each year. The judges of the Court of Appeal comprise the Bailiff and Deputy Bailiff, and a number of King's Counsel from the United Kingdom, the Channel Islands or the Isle of Man. Currently, there are 11 judges of the Court of Appeal, including the Bailiff of Guernsey.

==== Youth Appeal Court ====
The Youth Appeal Court is made up of the Bailiff and three members of the Youth Court Panel.

=== Judicial Committee of the Privy Council ===
Further appeals can be made to the Judicial Committee of the Privy Council, but only with special leave.

== Royal Court ==
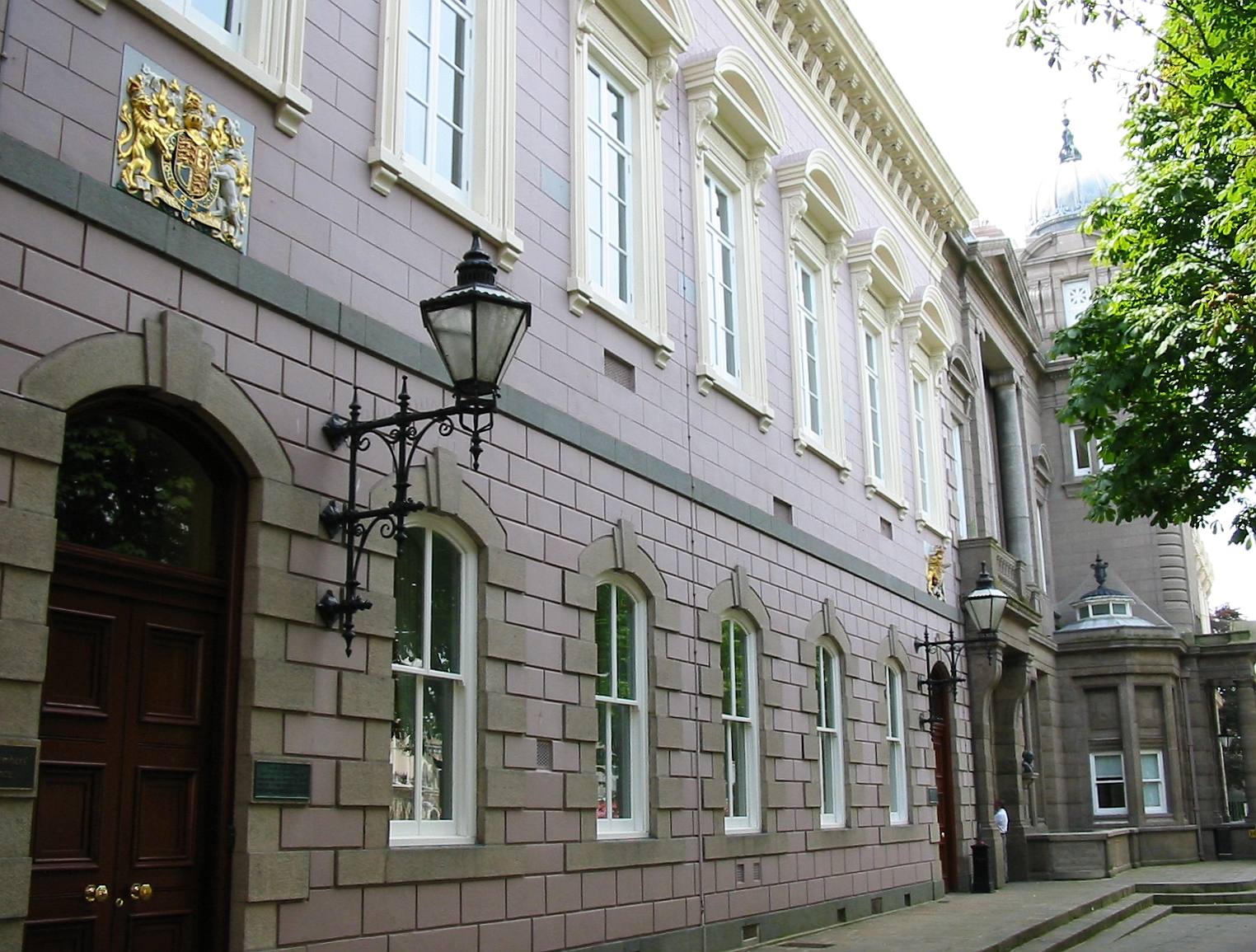
Royal Court building in Saint Helier

Originating in the 13th century when the King declared that Jersey should continue to follow Norman law, the Royal Court is the principal and oldest court in Jersey. The President of the Court is the Bailiff and the court is otherwise composed of the island's jurats. The Court has jurisdiction over both civil and criminal matters. The Royal Court also conducts the visites royale – yearly inspections of each of the parishes.

== Lower courts ==
The Magistrate's and Petty Debts Courts were established by legislation in 1853 to deal with minor criminal and civil cases instead of the Royal Court (although their jurisdiction is generally concurrent with that of the Royal Court, rather than exclusive). They are both presided over by the Magistrate, a position which was created as a distinct post in 1864. The Magistrate is referred to in the Jersey French of the legislation as the Juge d’Instruction, although his role is not the same as the position with the same title in inquisitorial systems.

=== Magistrate's Court ===
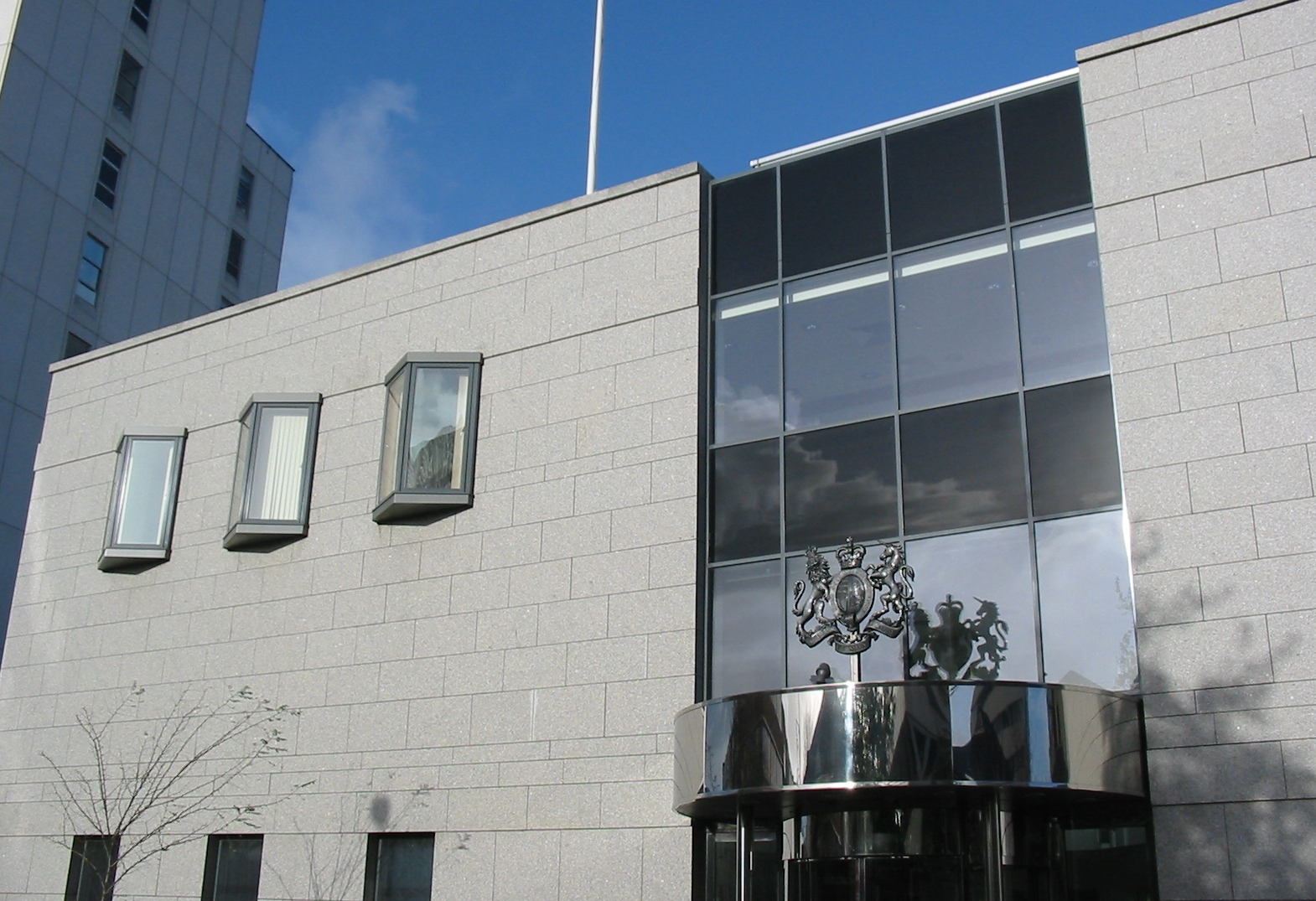
Magistrate's Court in Saint Helier

Jersey's Magistrate's Court was originally established in 1853 as the Police Court, and renamed the Magistrate's Court in 1996. The Magistrate can try any criminal offence if they consider that the appropriate sentence is not more than one year in prison or a fine of £10,000. If the Magistrate considers that a heavier sentence might be appropriate, then the case will be committed to the Royal Court for trial. Similarly after, having tried the case, the Magistrate subsequently decides that their sentencing powers are insufficient, they may refer the case to the Royal Court for sentencing.

=== Petty Debts Court ===
The Petty Debts Court deals with civil cases where the value of the claim is no more than £10,000. It also deals with landlord and tenant disputes.

=== Youth Court ===
The Youth Court was created in 1994 and is made up of the Magistrate and two members of the Youth Court Panel (which is appointed by the Superior Number of the Royal Court). It sits in private (although the press may be present) and deals with cases where the defendant is aged under 18, unless the likely sentence means that the case needs to be sent to the Royal Court.

== Parish hall enquiry ==
A parish hall enquiry is an informal way of dealing with minor criminal behaviour, particularly by young people, which has been in use in Jersey for over 800 years.

The enquiry is not actually a court hearing. It is an opportunity for the centenier (the head of the Honorary Police for the parish) to review the evidence and decide whether it is in the public interest for the case to be tried in the Magistrate's Court. In doing so the Centenier will discuss the evidence with the accused person and, if the offence is minor, possibly agree to a non-statutory sanction which will avoid the need for the case to go to court. Attendance at the enquiry is voluntary, the centenier does not make a finding of guilt (a sanction is only imposed if the accused agrees, otherwise the case is sent on to the Magistrate's Court). The accused may at any time elect to have the case referred to the Magistrate.

Sanctions which can be imposed include:

- no further action/'words of advice'
- a written caution
- a fine of up to £100 for some offences, e.g. minor motoring offences
- deferral of a sanction, dependent on good behaviour
- voluntary supervision by the probation service

These sanctions are not convictions but a record is kept and they may be referred to in the event of the accused coming into contact with the criminal justice system on a subsequent occasion.

The parish hall enquiry system has been found to "deal successfully and appropriately with a wide range of offending", to have a low rate of recidivism, and a high level of satisfaction amongst victims.

== Inquests ==
In the case of a sudden or unexpected death on the Island, an inquest will need to be held to determine the cause of death. The Viscount is the coroner (although in recent years this function has been delegated to the Deputy Viscount) and may sit with a jury, although this is unusual. Hearings take place in public.

== Tribunals ==
In addition to the courts, there are a number of Tribunals, including:

- Jersey Employment Tribunal
- Commissioners of Appeal for Tax
- Health and Safety Appeal Tribunal
- Health Services Disciplinary Tribunal
- Data Protection Tribunal
- Rent Control Tribunal
- Rate Appeal Board
- Social Security Tribunal,
- Mental Health Review Tribunal which is also the Capacity Law Review Tribunal
- Charity Tribunal.
- Investigatory Powers Tribunal

In 2017, the Jersey Law Commission recommended reform of Jersey's administrative tribunals, proposing the creation of a single tribunal (the Jersey Administrative Appeals Tribunal).

== States of Jersey Complaints Panel ==
The States of Jersey Complaints Panel provides a route for islanders to address grievances concerning administrative decisions made by ministers or Government of Jersey departments. If internal complaint processes fail to resolve the issue, individuals can escalate their concerns to this panel.

The panel was established under the Administrative Decisions (Review) (Jersey) Law 1982 and is managed by the Greffier of the States and a panel of lay volunteers.

In 2000, the Clothier Review of Jersey’s governance framework proposed replacing the Complaints Panel with a professional ombudsperson. Similarly, the Jersey Law Commission recommended the creation of a Jersey Public Services Ombudsperson in 2017. Although the Council of Ministers endorsed this recommendation in 2022, the matter is under review as of 2024.

== Judgments and law reports ==
Judgments of the Royal Court, Court of Appeal and the Employment Tribunal are published online by the Jersey Legal Information Board, as part of the Free Access to Law Movement. Since 1985, selected judgments containing points of legal principle are formally published in the Jersey Law Reports. Selected judgments between 1950 and 1984 were published in 11 volumes by the Royal Court in the Jersey Judgments series of law reports.

== See also ==
- Law of Jersey
- List of laws of Jersey
- Courts of Guernsey
- Judiciary of the Isle of Man
