= Vernon Tomes =

British politician

Vernon Amy Tomes (22 February 1932 – 1999) was Deputy Bailiff of Jersey in the Channel Islands from 1986 to 1992.

== Early life ==
Tomes was born in St John, Jersey the son of Wilfred James Tomes, a former Connétable of the parish, and Florence Annie Amy. He was educated at St John's Elementary School and (on a States of Jersey scholarship) at Victoria College, Jersey. He left school aged 15.

== Legal career ==
In 1951, Tomes qualified as a solicitor of the Royal Court of Jersey. He practised in the same law firm as Peter Crill, who would later instigate his removal from office as Deputy Bailiff.

In 1969 Tomes was appointed HM Solicitor General. During his tenure, he announced that birching would be abolished as a judicial punishment.

He served as HM Attorney General between 1975 and 1985.

== Judicial appointment and removal from office ==
He served as Deputy Bailiff from 1986 to 1992.

On 12 May 1992, the Lieutenant Governor announced to the States Assembly that Her Majesty the Queen had decided to remove Tomes from office as Deputy Bailiff from 30 June 1992. The Lieutenant Governor said the reason for Tomes' dismissal was delays in producing timely judgments, which had led to concerns that Article 6 of the European Convention on Human Rights was being breached. His Excellency stated, 'Over the last few weeks we have all seen or heard comments or claims that Mr. Tomes was a victim of a conspiracy by the Jersey establishment because he did not have the right background; that he had been unreasonably overburdened with work; and that he had not been given a proper opportunity to recover his backlog of judgments; that there had been a lack of proper consultation before serious steps were contemplated; and especially that the Home Office was interfering in what was rightfully the business of the States of Jersey. I have to tell you now that not one of these points has any firm foundation'

The removal from office was instigated by the Bailiff Sir Peter Crill, who made a request to the United Kingdom's Home Secretary Kenneth Clarke. According Crill, Tomes was accused by the police of tipping off a friend about a drugs raid on a nephew's home and the office received complaints that Tomes was slow in producing written judgments.

The Home Secretary announced Tomes' dismissal in the House of Commons on 19 May 1992. Crowds gathered in St Helier to show their support on Tomes' last day as Deputy Bailiff.

== Political career ==
Tomes served two terms as a member of the States Assembly.

From 1960 to 1969, he represented St Helier No. 2 District. During this period, he held several key positions, including as president of the Public Works Committee, Legislation Committee, Fort Regent Committee, and Agriculture Committee. He also served as vice-president of the Prison Board, Natural Beauties Committee, and Finance Committee.

Following his dismissal as Deputy Bailiff, Tomes ran for election as a Senator in the 1993 elections. His campaign focused on reforming Jersey's constitution to remove the Bailiff as presiding officer of the States Assembly. He topped the polls in that election.

== Sources ==
- Alastair Layzell (ed), Who's Who in the Channel Islands 1987 (Jersey 1987)
