= Jurat =

Judge of fact in the Channel Islands

The jurats (/ˈdʒʊəræt, ˈʒʊərɑː/) are lay people in Guernsey and Jersey who act as judges of fact rather than law, though they preside over land conveyances and liquor licensing. In Alderney, however, the jurats are judges of both fact and law (assisted by their learned clerk) in both civil and criminal matters.

== Etymology ==
The term derives from the Latin iūrātus, "sworn [man]".

== History ==
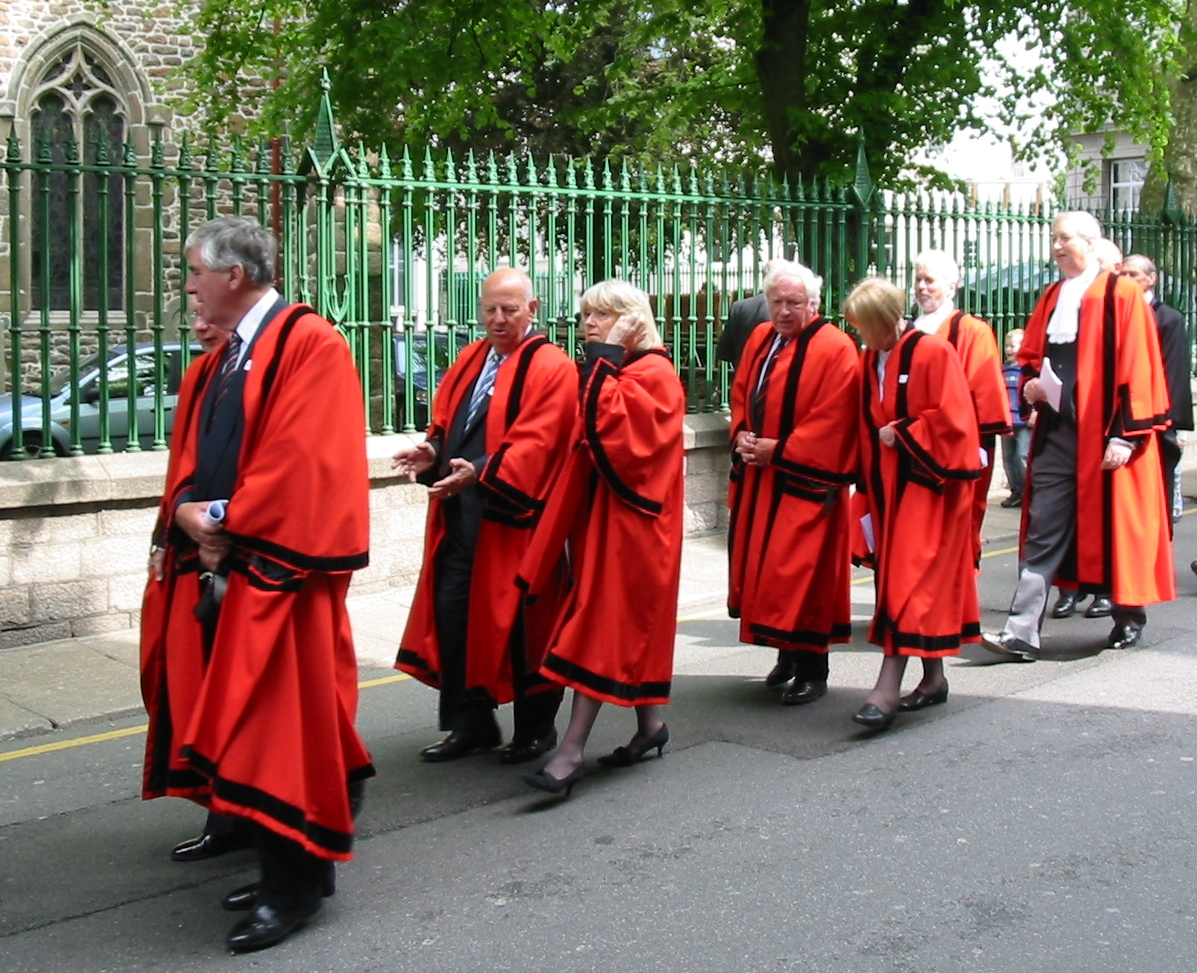
Jurats in robes of office in procession on Liberation Day 9 May 2008 in Jersey (Solicitor General and Attorney General following also in red robes but wearing jabots)

Under the Ancien Régime in France, in several towns, of the south-west, such as La Rochelle and Bordeaux, the jurats were members of the municipal body. The title was also borne by officials, corresponding to aldermen, in the Cinque Ports, but is now chiefly used as a title of office in the Channel Islands.

There are two bodies, consisting each of twelve jurats, for the Bailiwicks of Jersey and of Guernsey respectively. They form, with the bailiff as presiding judge, the Royal Court in each Bailiwick. In Guernsey and Jersey, the jurats, as lay people, are judges of fact rather than law, though they preside over land conveyances and liquor licensing. In Alderney, however, the jurats are judges of both fact and law (assisted by their learned clerk) in both civil and criminal matters.

Until the constitutional reforms introduced in the 1940s to separate legislature and judiciary, they were elected for life, in Jersey by islandwide suffrage, in Guernsey by the States of Election, and were a constituent part of the legislative bodies.

Although no longer a political post, the office of jurat is still considered the highest elected position to which a citizen can aspire.

However, in Alderney, jurats are appointed by the Crown, following a recommendation from the President of Alderney.

== Jersey ==
In Jersey, the power to raise excise duties was exercised by the Assembly of Governor, Bailiff and Jurats. These financial powers, along with the assets of the Assembly, were finally taken over by the States of Jersey in 1921, thereby enabling the States to control the budget independently of the Lieutenant Governor of Jersey. In 1948 the jurats were replaced in the legislature by directly elected senators.

Jurats serve as non-professional judges of fact (though not of law). They also determine sentences in criminal matters and assess damages in civil matters. There are twelve Jurats at any one time, who are indirectly elected by an electoral college constituted of States Members and members of the legal profession. Jurats serve until retirement at age 72, or earlier once they have served in the role for six years. The robes of jurats are red with black trim.

The Royal Court sits either as the Inferior Number (judge and two jurats) or the Superior Number (judge and at least five jurats). Only the Superior Number can impose sentences of imprisonment of more than four years. The Superior Number also acts as a court of first appeal in respect of sentences handed down by the Inferior Number. Otherwise, Appeals from the Inferior Number and the Superior Number are heard by the Jersey Court of Appeal, in which jurats do not sit. Thereafter, any appeal would be heard by the Judicial Committee of the Privy Council sitting in London.

Jurats also sit on the Island's Licensing Assembly (which grants liquor licences) and customarily serve as autorisés to oversee polling at public elections and declare the results.

The Prison Board of Visitors, which is responsible for overseeing the care of prisoners in Jersey's prison system, comprises seven jurats, who inspect the prison regularly and, whilst visiting, hear any prisoners' complaints. In 2009, a report raised concerns about potential conflicts of interests, and recommended that membership of the board should include independent members of the public.

== Guernsey ==
In Guernsey, the jurats are still elected by the States of Election, made up of the Island's judiciary, law officers and Anglican clergy.

The Royal Court of Guernsey sits either as the Ordinary Court (Bailiff or Deputy Bailiff and two jurats) or the Full Court (Bailiff or Deputy Bailiff and seven jurats).

The position of Juré-Justicier Suppléant was created in 2008 whereby a Jurat with over five years service and is aged over 65 may retire and offer themselves for election as a Juré-Justicier Suppléant whereby the retirement age advances to 75.

The robes of jurats are purple (although the precise shade has varied).

== Alderney ==
The court of Alderney consists of six jurats (appointed by the Crown) and the Judge of Alderney.

== See also ==
- Juror
- Lay judge
- Capitoul, the equivalent office in Toulouse
