= 2025 in Jersey =

Events in the year 2025 in Jersey.

== Incumbents ==
- Sovereign: Charles III
- Lieutenant governor: Jerry Kyd
- Chief minister: Lyndon Farnham
- Bailiff: Timothy Le Cocq (until 17 October); Robert MacRae onwards

== Events ==
- 24 October: Robert MacRae becomes bailiff of Jersey.
