= 2021 in Jersey =

Events in the year 2021 in Jersey.

== Incumbents ==
- Sovereign: Elizabeth II
- Lieutenant governor: Stephen Dalton
- Chief minister: John Le Fondré
- Bailiff: Timothy Le Cocq

== Events ==
- Ongoing: COVID-19 pandemic in Jersey; 2021 Jersey dispute
- 11 January: Schools across Jersey reopen following the COVID-19 pandemic.
- 3 February: Non-essential retail businesses re-opened (nine days later than originally planned due to localized COVID-19 clusters).
- 17 February: Hospitality venues are allowed to reopen, including the resumption of all outdoor sport and the opening of visitor attractions.
- 15 March: Indoor sporting events and venues are allowed to re-open.
- 30 March: Representation of Sheppard re Powell
- 26 August: All COVID-19 restrictions are lifted, except from a mask mandate on public transport and at Ports of Jersey sites.
