= 2024 in Jersey =

Events in the year 2024 in Jersey.

== Incumbents ==
- Sovereign: Charles III
- Lieutenant governor: Jerry Kyd
- Chief minister: Lyndon Farnham
- Bailiff: Timothy Le Cocq

== Events ==
- 15 July: Charles III and Camilla visit Jersey.
