= Politics of Jersey =

States of Jersey Êtats d'Jèrri (Jèrriais) États de Jersey (French)
- Coat of arms of Jersey
- Type: Unitary parliamentary democratic constitutional monarchy

Legislative branch
- Name: States Assembly
- Type: Unicameral
- Bailiff: Robert MacRae KC
- Seat: States Chamber

Executive branch
- Monarch: King Charles III
- Appointed by: Hereditary
- Chief Minister: Lyndon Farnham

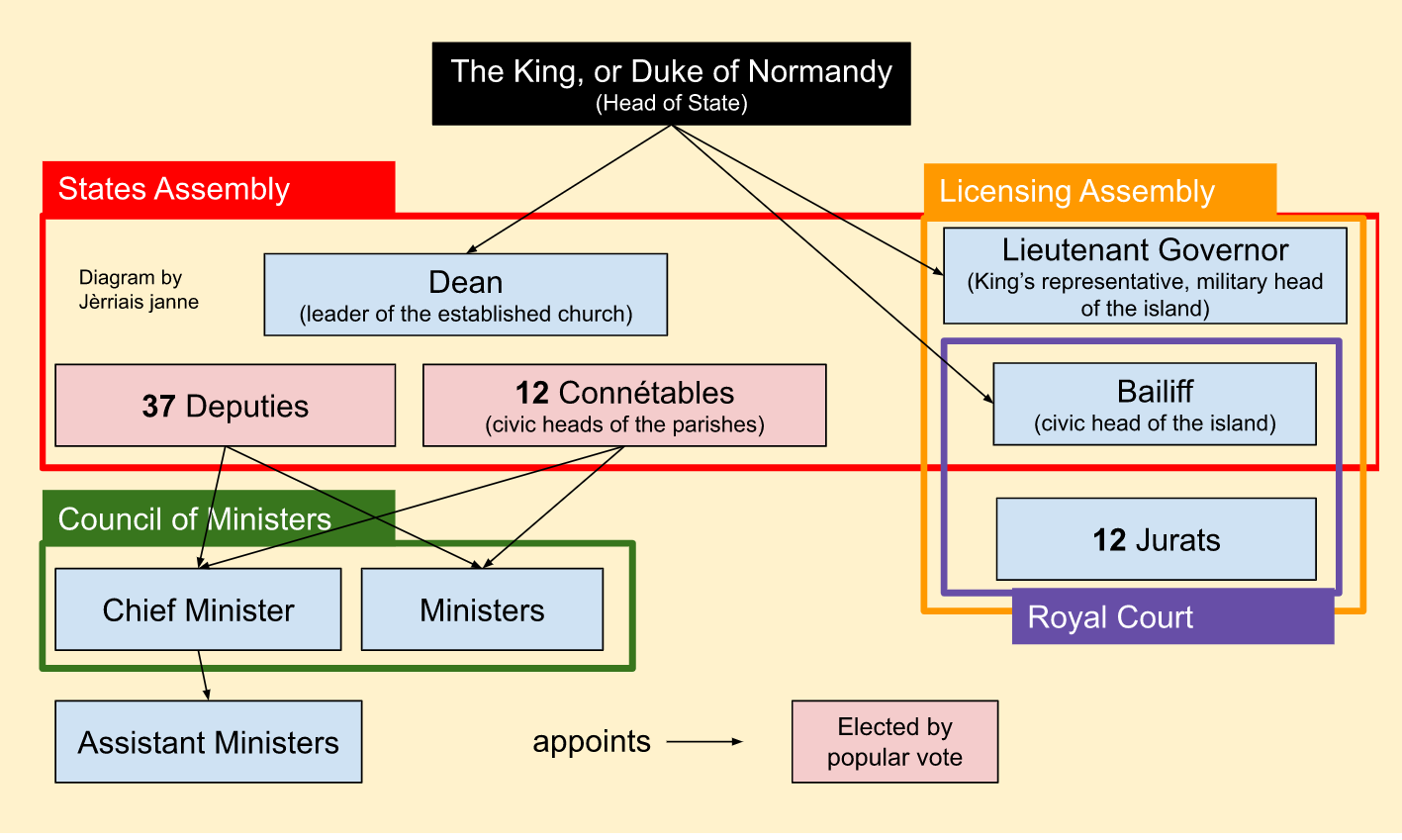
A diagram representing Jersey's political structure

Jersey is a self-governing Crown Dependency in the British Islands. It is not part of the United Kingdom and is not represented in the UK Parliament, but the United Kingdom is responsible for the island's defence and, in international law, for its international relations. Jersey has its own legislature, government, courts and legal system, and has a high degree of domestic, fiscal and administrative autonomy.

Politics in Jersey takes place within a parliamentary democratic constitutional monarchy. The monarch is head of state and is represented in the island by the Lieutenant Governor. The States Assembly is the island's unicameral legislature. Since 2026 it has had 49 elected members: nine senators, 28 deputies and the 12 connétables of the parishes. The Bailiff presides over the Assembly and is also chief justice and civic head of the island.

Since 2005, Jersey has had a ministerial system of government. The Chief Minister and ministers are selected by the States Assembly from among its elected members and form the Council of Ministers. Government is therefore formed through Assembly selection rather than through the automatic appointment of a majority-party leader.

Jersey politics has historically been dominated by independent candidates rather than political parties. Party politics has become more visible in the twenty-first century, especially through Reform Jersey, but independents remain central to elections and government formation. Other recurring features of Jersey political culture include the importance of parish identity, debates about constitutional autonomy, the role of Crown-appointed offices, population and migration pressures, the influence of the finance sector, and contested ideas of the "Jersey Way".

== History ==
=== Origins of self-government ===
Jersey's self-government developed from the island's position as a Crown Dependency after the loss of mainland Normandy by King John in 1204. The island was not absorbed into the Kingdom of England, and retained its own legal and administrative institutions. Royal charters and customary law confirmed the continuation of local privileges, including the use of Jersey's own laws and courts.

Medieval government combined judicial, legislative and administrative functions. The Royal Court, presided over by the Bailiff and Jurats, exercised both judicial and law-making authority, while the Crown's representative, later the Governor and then Lieutenant Governor, was principally concerned with defence and royal authority. The States Assembly developed from meetings of the island's estates, including the Bailiff and Jurats, the rectors of the parishes and the Connétables. The earliest surviving Act of the States dates from 1524.

A further constitutional distinction developed in the early seventeenth century from disputes between the Governor, Sir John Peyton, and the Bailiff, Jean Hérault. In 1617, the Privy Council declared that “the charge of the military forces” should belong to the Governor, while “the care of justice and civil affairs” should belong to the Bailiff. The ruling became an important precedent for the separation between the Crown representative's responsibility for defence and the island's domestic institutions.

The long-term development of Jersey politics has therefore involved the gradual separation of functions that were once combined in a small number of offices and institutions. Later reforms altered the composition of the States Assembly, reduced the political role of the Jurats and rectors, introduced elected deputies and senators, and eventually replaced committee government with a ministerial system in 2005.

=== Corn Riots and the Code of 1771 ===
In the eighteenth century, tensions grew over the concentration of power in the hands of the Bailiff, Jurats and leading island families. Both the Royal Court and the States Assembly exercised law-making functions, and political conflict was sharpened by disputes over food prices, seigneurial privileges and the administration of justice. In September 1769, protests culminated in the Corn Riots, when several hundred islanders entered the Royal Court to present grievances about the price of wheat and the island's governing authorities.

The unrest led to intervention by the Crown and reforms associated with the Lieutenant Governor, George Bentinck. The Code of 1771 consolidated Jersey law and confirmed that new legislation could be made only by the States Assembly and approved by the Crown. This removed the Royal Court's law-making power and marked an important stage in the separation of legislative and judicial functions in Jersey's constitution.

=== Party politics: Magots and Charlots ===
The late 18th century was the first time political parties in some form came into existence on the island. Jean Dumaresq was an early Liberal who called for democratic reforms (that the States should be democratically elected Deputies and should have vested in them executive power). His supporters were known as Magots ("maggots", initially an insult from his opponents, which the Magots reclaimed as their own term) and his opponents as the Charlots (supporters of the Lieutenant Baliff Charles Lempière). Dumaresq is quoted as saying "we shall make these Seigneurs bite the dust". In 1776, he was elected as Connétable for St Peter.^{:200}

The post-Napoleonic War period was a divisive period politically for the island. In 1821, there was an election for Jurat. The St Laurentine Laurelites (conservatives, the eventual name for the Charlots) attacked the Inn in their village where Rose men (the progressive descendants of the Magots) were holding a meeting. They damaged the building and injured both the innkeeper and his wife. On election day in St Martin, the a number of Rose voters were attacked, after which most Rose men refrained from voting. Although the Rose candidate won overall, he faced a number of lawsuits over claims of voter fraud, so in the end the Laurel candidate George Bertram took office.^{:232}

=== Nineteenth-century reform ===
During the nineteenth century, Jersey's institutions came under pressure from both local reformers and the United Kingdom authorities. Reform debates focused on the overlap between judicial, legislative and administrative functions, the limited representative basis of the States, and the extent to which Jersey's Norman-derived law and institutions should be retained or replaced by models closer to those used in England.

One strand of reform was associated with English-speaking residents and middle-class reformers in St Helier, who criticised Jersey's legal system and limited access to political power. Abraham Le Cras, a prominent campaigner, challenged the authority of the States to legislate and argued for closer integration with England. His campaign contributed to pressure for a Royal Commission on Jersey's laws and institutions, although many islanders regarded such proposals as a threat to local autonomy.

The most significant reforms followed disputes with the Privy Council in the 1850s. In 1856, elected Deputies were added to the States Assembly for the first time, with one Deputy elected from each country parish and three from St Helier. The reforms did not create modern democracy, but they marked an important stage in the gradual widening of elected representation and in continuing debates about the balance between Jersey's autonomy and external pressure for institutional change.

=== Reforms of 1948 ===
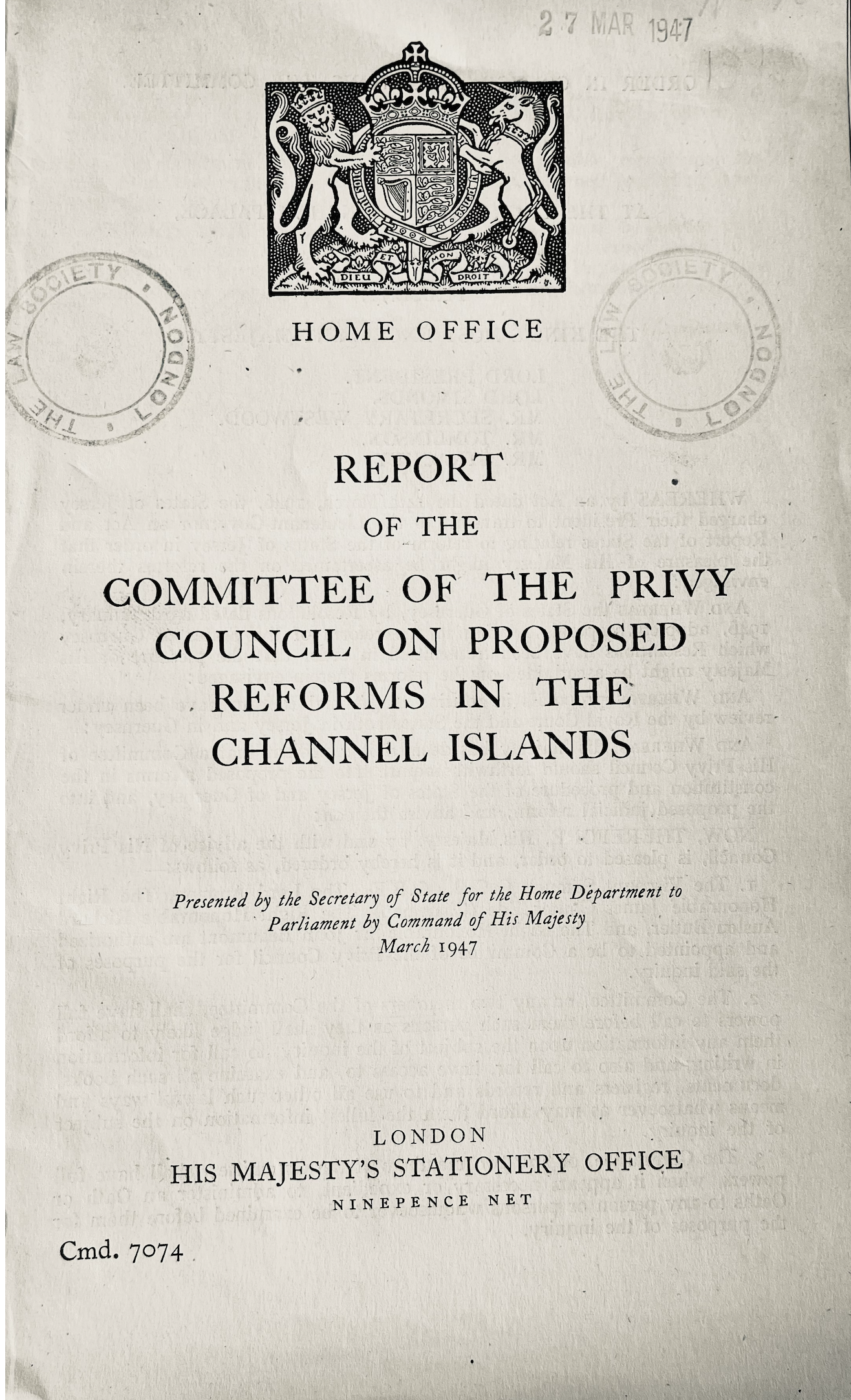

After the Occupation, many islanders called for the reform and modernisation of the States: a poll by the JEP showed that only 88 of the 1,784 surveyed thought Rectors should stay in the States, and a vast majority wanted the legislature and judiciary separated. The Jersey Democratic Movement campaigned for either the incorporation of the island as a county of England or at least the abolition of the States. The other political party to emerge during this period was the Progressive Party, consisting of some present States members, who opposed the JDM. In the 1945 Deputies' election, the Progressives won a landslide victory, giving a mandate for change. The franchise was extended to all British adults; previously voting rights in Jersey had only been accorded to men, and women over 30, according to property ownership. The largest reform was the 1948 States reform. Jurats were no longer States members, and were to be elected by an Electoral College. The reform also introduced a retirement age of 70 for Jurats. In all cases, the Bailiff would be the judge of the law, and the Jurats the "judge of fact". The Jurats' role in the States was taken on by 12 senators, four of whom would retire every three years. The Church also lost most of its representation in the States, with the role of Rector being abolished and the number of Deputies increased to 28. The first senatorial election was brief. Each Senator was elected for either nine, six or three years depending on where they came in the polling list. Philip Le Feuvre topped the poll and was elected for nine years. On 8 December 1945 in the Deputies' election, Ivy Forster of the Progressive Party became the first woman ever elected to the States. Other notable successful candidates included John Le Marquand Jr. (whose father had recently been returned as Senator) and Cyril Le Marquand.

== Constitution ==
Jersey politics takes place within the framework of the island's status as a self-governing Crown Dependency. Jersey is not part of the United Kingdom and is not represented in the UK Parliament, but the United Kingdom is responsible for the island's defence and, in international law, for its international relations. By charter and convention, the UK Parliament does not normally legislate for Jersey without the island's consent. Primary legislation passed by the States Assembly is submitted for UK scrutiny before royal assent; the Ministry of Justice examines whether there is any conflict with the United Kingdom's international obligations or with fundamental constitutional principles before advising the Privy Council.

=== Constitutional framework for political activity ===
Jersey has its own legislature, government, courts and legal system, and its constitutional arrangements set the basic rules for political participation and government formation. Elections to the States Assembly are held every four years, with all members elected on the same day, and residents may vote from the age of 16 if they meet the residence requirements. Political parties may register under the Political Parties (Registration) (Jersey) Law 2008, although most elected members have historically sat as independents. Since 2005, executive government has operated through a ministerial system, with a Chief Minister and Council of Ministers selected from among elected members of the States Assembly.

The States of Jersey Law 2005 recognises the island's autonomous capacity in domestic affairs and its increasing participation in international affairs. The 2007 Framework for Developing the International Identity of Jersey clarified the modern relationship between Jersey and the United Kingdom and supported Jersey's ability to act internationally where appropriate.

=== The Crown and constitutional offices ===
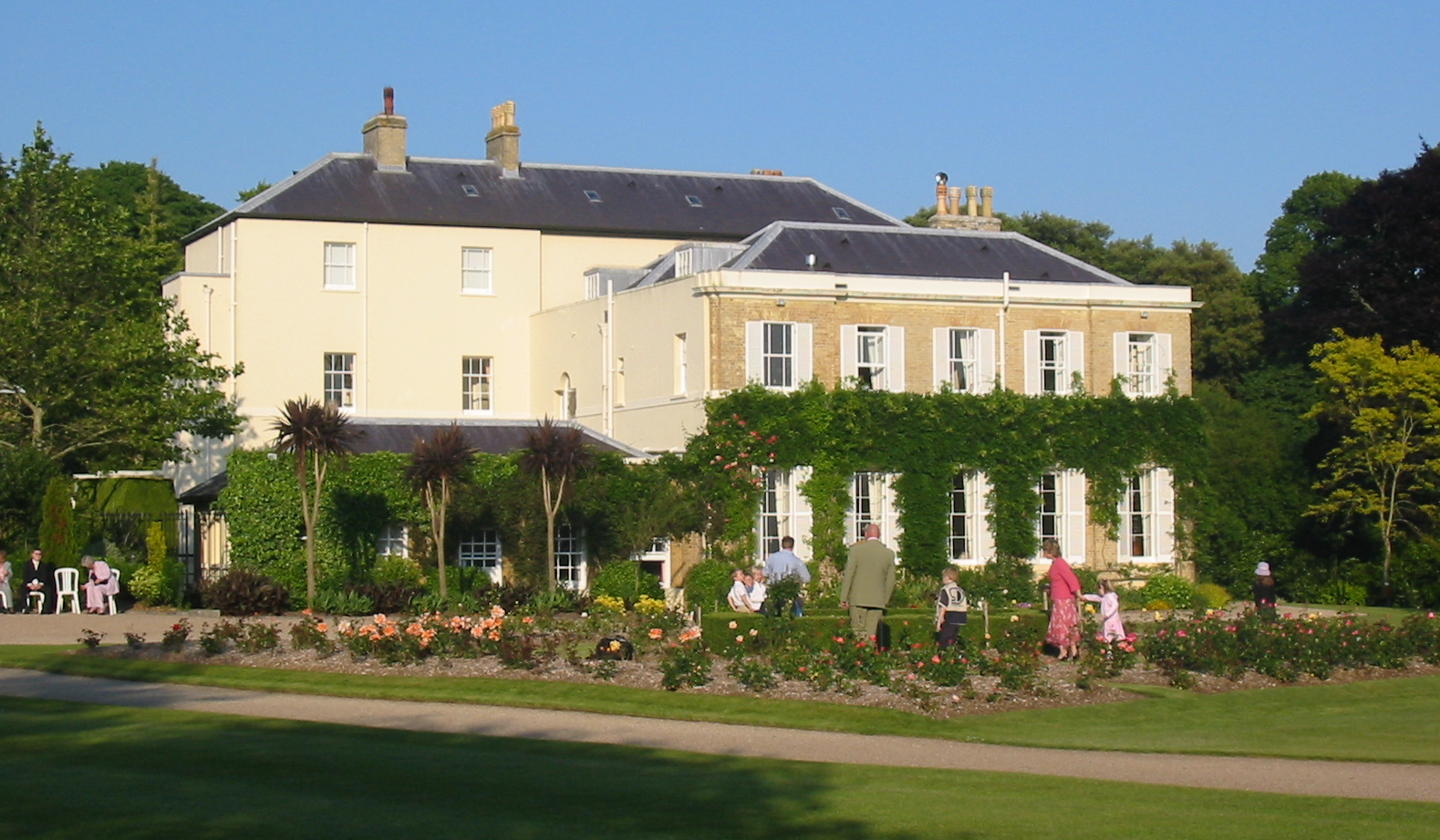
Government House, Jersey — official residence of the Lieutenant Governor

The monarch is Jersey's head of state, acting in right of Jersey. The Lieutenant Governor represents the monarch in the island and acts as a point of contact between the Jersey and United Kingdom governments. The office is politically neutral: Government House describes the Lieutenant Governor as the monarch's "personal representative and impartial adviser", with principally representational, ceremonial and community responsibilities.

The political significance of the Crown is seen less through day-to-day government than through Jersey's Crown Officers. The Bailiff, Deputy Bailiff, Attorney General and Solicitor General are appointed by the Crown, but perform functions within Jersey's own constitutional system. The Bailiff is both President of the Royal Court and presiding officer of the States Assembly, as well as civic head of the island; the Attorney General is head of the prosecution service and legal adviser to the States, ministers and scrutiny panels. The Bailiff, Attorney General and Solicitor General are also non-voting members of the States Assembly. The Deputy Bailiff may exercise the Bailiff's functions when deputising for the Bailiff, but is not separately constituted as a member of the States.

The Crown Officers therefore sit at the boundary between law, constitutional guardianship and politics. Supporters of the existing arrangements have argued that Crown Officers provide continuity, constitutional expertise and a channel of communication with the United Kingdom. Critics have argued that the presence of unelected office-holders in and around the legislature is inconsistent with modern democratic accountability and separation of powers. The roles of the Crown Officers, especially the Bailiff's dual role and the Law Officers' position in relation to the States Assembly, have accordingly been recurring subjects of constitutional debate.

=== Constitutional debates ===
Other aspects of Jersey’s constitutional framework are also recurring subjects of political debate. Contested issues have included the position of the connétables as ex officio members of the Assembly, the creation, abolition and reintroduction of senators, electoral reform, a directly elected chief minister, the appointment of non-elected members to Assembly scrutiny panels, and the creation of a public services ombudsperson.

== Legislature ==
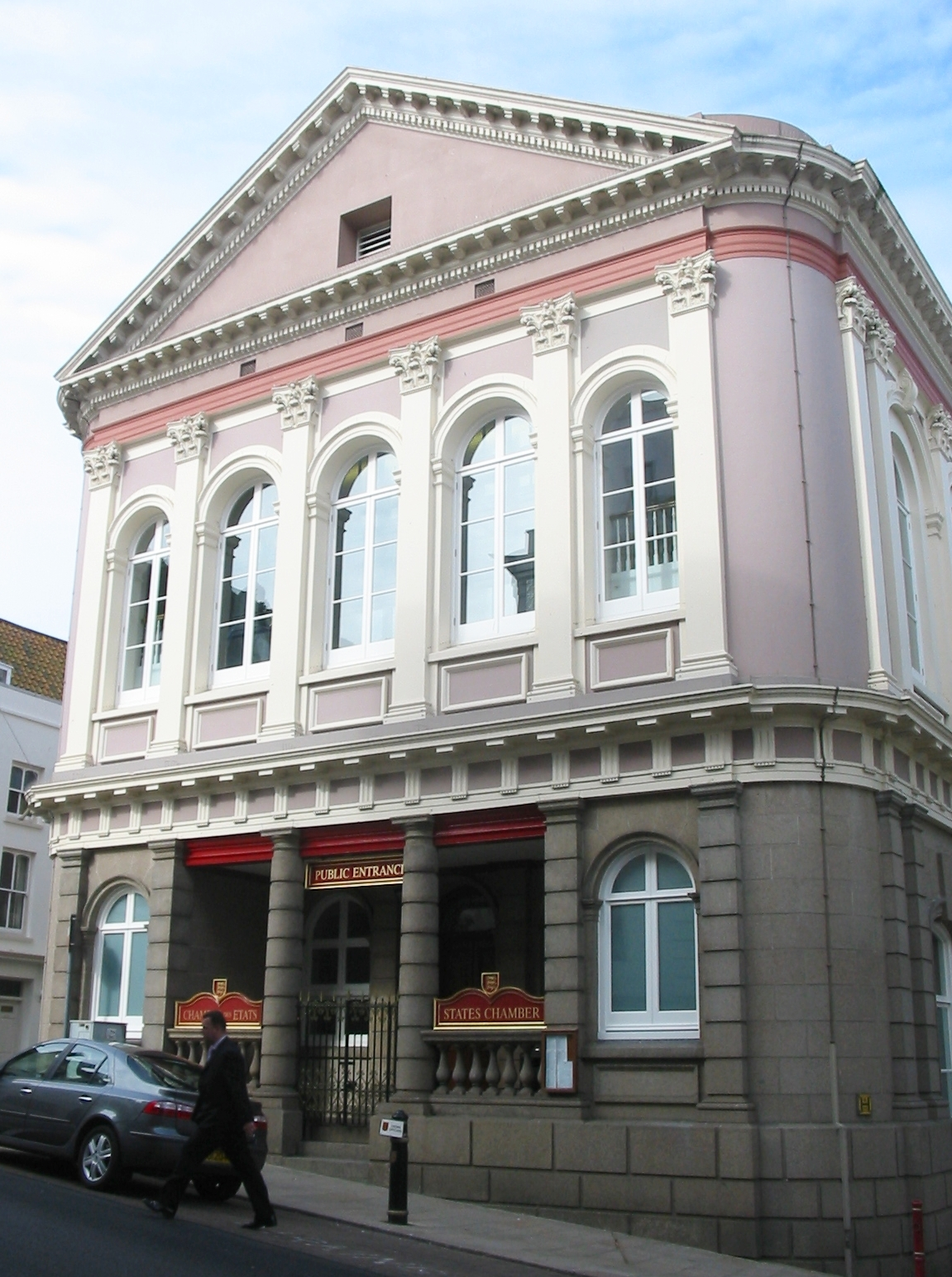
The States Building in St. Helier

The States Assembly is Jersey's unicameral legislature and the central forum for island politics. It makes legislation, approves public expenditure, selects the Chief Minister and ministers, and scrutinises the Council of Ministers. It has 54 members in law, of whom 49 are elected and entitled to vote. Since 2026, the elected members have comprised nine senators elected island-wide, 28 deputies elected from nine constituencies, and the connétables of the twelve parishes.

The five statutory non-voting members are the Bailiff, Lieutenant-Governor, Dean of Jersey, Attorney General and Solicitor General. They sit by virtue of their respective constitutional or Crown offices. All members may speak in the Assembly, but only elected members may vote. The Bailiff ordinarily presides over sittings of the Assembly, a role which has itself been a recurring subject of constitutional debate. The Deputy Bailiff may preside when deputising for the Bailiff but is not separately constituted as a member of the Assembly under Article 2.

The Assembly is politically significant because government is formed from within it rather than elected separately. After each general election, elected members choose the Chief Minister and then appoint ministers. In a system where most members have usually sat as independents, government formation depends on support among individual States members rather than on a majority party or formal coalition.

Individual elected members also have substantial procedural influence. Members may bring forward propositions for debate, lodge amendments and serve as ministers, assistant ministers, scrutiny members or committee chairs. Scrutiny panels and the Public Accounts Committee monitor ministerial policy, public expenditure and administration; members of the public may suggest topics, give evidence and attend public hearings. This gives non-ministerial members a more visible role in policy debate than in more party-disciplined parliamentary systems.

== Executive government ==
Before 2005, executive and legislative functions in Jersey were largely combined in the States of Jersey. Government was carried out through a committee system, under which committees made up of States members administered different areas of policy. The system was sometimes defended as inclusive, since many elected members took part directly in administration, but it was also criticised for slow decision-making, weak co-ordination and unclear individual political responsibility.

A ministerial system of government was introduced in December 2005, following the recommendations of the review of Jersey's machinery of government chaired by Sir Cecil Clothier. Under the States of Jersey Law 2005, the Council of Ministers consists of the Chief Minister and at least seven other ministers. Its statutory functions include co-ordinating ministerial policy and administration, agreeing policy affecting more than one minister, agreeing common policy on external relations, prioritising executive and legislative proposals, and lodging a Common Strategic Policy for approval by the States Assembly.

The Chief Minister is selected by the States Assembly from among its elected members. Ministers are also selected by the Assembly, after nominations by the Chief Minister-designate and any other elected member. This means that the executive is formed through Assembly selection rather than through the automatic appointment of a party leader following a majority-party election. In practice, a Chief Minister must assemble a Council of Ministers capable of securing and maintaining broad support in an Assembly usually dominated by independents.

Ministerial government created a clearer executive, but not a fully party-based system of government. The Council of Ministers sets the overall direction of government through the Common Strategic Policy, while individual ministers remain politically accountable for their portfolios and for decisions taken under Jersey's system of ministerial government.

The role of the Chief Executive and senior civil servants has also been politically sensitive. Under the Public Finances (Jersey) Law 2019, the Chief Executive is the Principal Accountable Officer for most States bodies, responsible for propriety, regularity, value for money and good governance in the implementation of policy, while policy decisions remain the responsibility of ministers. During debate on the 2018 machinery-of-government reforms, concerns were raised that interposing the Principal Accountable Officer between ministers and chief officers could create a problematic division of accountability.

== Political organisations ==
=== Political parties ===
Jersey has not had a stable party system comparable to those in many parliamentary democracies. Earlier political divisions included the conservative Roses or Charlots and the progressive Laurels or Magots, but since the mid-twentieth century the States Assembly has been dominated by independents rather than organised political parties. Party activity increased after the creation of ministerial government in 2005, most notably with the formation of Reform Jersey.

Other electoral groupings and movements, including Better Way 2022 and Value Jersey, have supported or endorsed candidates without operating as registered political parties. The distinction between registered parties, independent candidates and non-party political movements became more prominent after the emergence of Value Jersey in 2025–26, raising questions about how campaign finance and third-party political activity should be regulated.

At the 2026 general election, two political parties fielded candidates: Reform Jersey and People First. Reform Jersey won seven seats, while People First’s two candidates were unsuccessful. Six independent candidates who endorsed Value Jersey’s programme were elected.

=== Pressure groups ===
Pressure groups and interest groups have been a recurring feature of Jersey politics, particularly because the States Assembly has usually been dominated by independents rather than political parties. Some groups represent economic or professional interests, such as business, finance, farming, hospitality and trade unions, while others campaign on environmental, heritage, constitutional or social issues. Reform Jersey itself began as a pressure group before registering as a political party in 2014.

Interest groups commonly seek to influence policy through consultation responses, scrutiny submissions and direct engagement with ministers and States members. For example, States Assembly scrutiny reviews have received evidence from organisations including the Jersey Chamber of Commerce, Jersey Finance, the Jersey Farmers' Union, Unite the Union and the National Trust for Jersey.

Single-issue campaigns have also played a role in island politics. A prominent example was the campaign over the future of the Plémont headland, where the National Trust for Jersey sought public support for acquiring and restoring the former holiday village site; after earlier States debates, the site was acquired in 2014 with support from a States grant.

Churches and faith-based organisations have also intervened in debates on moral and social policy. The Dean of Jersey (who is a non-voting unelected member of the Assembly) was consulted during the reform of sexual offences law in the 2000s, and church organisations made submissions during scrutiny of same-sex marriage legislation. Religious and faith-based contributors were also recorded in the consultation process leading to the States Assembly's in-principle decision on assisted dying in 2021.

== Political culture ==
Political culture refers to the habits, assumptions and recurring themes that shape political life in Jersey, beyond the formal institutions of government. These include the island’s changing attitudes on social issues, strong consensus about constitutional autonomy, the continuing importance of parish identity, and preference for independent candidates.

=== Social conservatism ===
A strand of social conservatism has been visible in Jersey politics and public administration, although it has rarely been organised through political parties. It drew on several sources, including religious observance, parish life, customary law and a political culture in which senior office-holders retained important discretionary functions. One visible part of this culture was the strength of Methodism. Methodist chapels and Sunday schools formed a significant part of the island’s social and cultural life, particularly from the nineteenth century, but they should be seen as part of a wider pattern rather than as the sole source of conservative attitudes.

A reported 1969 case, in which a young Portuguese unmarried mother was ordered to leave Jersey despite a local petition and public campaign, has been cited as an example of the moral assumptions that could shape immigration and residence decisions.

This conservatism was reflected in the comparatively slow reform of laws governing sexuality. England and Wales had partially decriminalised male homosexual acts in private in 1967, followed by Scotland in 1980 and Northern Ireland in 1982; Jersey did not do so until the Sexual Offences (Jersey) Law 1990, after concerns raised by the UK Government about compliance with the European Convention on Human Rights. The 1990 Law permitted homosexual acts in private only where the parties had reached 21, and the threshold was reduced to 18 in 1995. The age of consent was equalised at 16 only in 2006, after proceedings in the European Court of Human Rights in Small v United Kingdom, in which the Jersey authorities accepted that the unequal age of consent violated the Convention and agreed to amend the law.

Another example was the regulation of public entertainment. Public entertainment in Jersey has historically required permission through the Bailiff, with the Bailiff’s Public Entertainment Panel continuing to act as the licensing authority for most public events. Official guidance states that the purpose of the system is partly public safety, but also whether proposed entertainment is “suitable for public consumption”. The Bailiff’s former role in theatre censorship attracted controversy in the late twentieth century, including the refusal of permission for a production of Howard Brenton’s Christie in Love and required alterations to a production of Shakespeare’s Coriolanus.

Religiously influenced restrictions also survived in licensing law. Article 72 of the Licensing (Jersey) Law 1974 placed restrictions on cinemas, theatres and designated nightclubs on Good Friday and Christmas Day, and the law continued to be reported in the 2020s as limiting music and dancing on Good Friday.

By the early twenty-first century, however, social conservatism appeared to have weakened as a dominant political force. Jersey introduced civil partnerships for same-sex couples in 2012, same-sex marriage in 2018, and in 2026 the States Assembly approved assisted dying legislation for terminally ill adults.

=== Constitutional autonomy and independence ===
A recurring feature of Jersey politics has been the defence of the island's constitutional autonomy, rather than an organised campaign for independence from the United Kingdom. The issue has tended to arise when Jersey's domestic autonomy or external position has appeared vulnerable. In 1969, following the announcement of a Royal Commission on the Constitution which would examine the United Kingdom's relationship with the Channel Islands and the Isle of Man, a House of Commons debate recorded Jersey's concern about possible changes to its constitutional position. The UK Government stated that it had no intention of reducing Jersey's autonomy in domestic affairs.

The States of Jersey has nevertheless examined the practical implications of independence. In 2005, the Policy and Resources Committee established a Constitution Review Group, chaired by Sir Philip Bailhache, to consider the advantages and disadvantages of independence or other changes in Jersey's constitutional relationship with the United Kingdom. Its second interim report, presented in 2008, considered the work that would be required if Jersey were obliged to seek independence because of external pressure, and concluded that Jersey was "equipped to face the challenges of independence".

Government policy has generally treated independence as a contingency rather than an objective. The Council of Ministers' 2012 Common Policy for External Relations stated that Jersey was a self-governing democratic country with the power of self-determination, but that it was not government policy to seek independence from the United Kingdom. The policy was instead to ensure that Jersey was prepared for external change affecting its relationship with the United Kingdom or European Union. Later external-relations policy has continued to emphasise Jersey's separate international identity, domestic and fiscal autonomy, and engagement with the United Kingdom, France, the European Union and international organisations.

=== Finance, taxation and economic pragmatism ===
Jersey's status as an international finance centre has been a central feature of its political culture. Successive governments have placed strong emphasis on fiscal autonomy, economic competitiveness and the island's ability to regulate its own tax and financial-services policy. The financial services sector is the largest part of Jersey's economy, accounting for almost two-fifths of total gross value added in 2024.

This has contributed to a political style often described in terms of pragmatism rather than ideology. Debates about tax, public spending, migration, housing and external relations are frequently shaped by the perceived need to protect Jersey's competitiveness while maintaining public services and social infrastructure. Critics, including the Tax Justice Network, have argued that Jersey is economically dependent on, and politically influenced by, its offshore finance sector.

=== Parish identity and localism ===
Parish identity is an enduring feature of Jersey political culture. The island is divided into twelve parishes, each headed by an elected connétable. A person elected to that parish office also becomes a voting member of the States Assembly by virtue of holding the office. Parish life also includes the Parish Assembly, which deals with parish affairs, and the Honorary Police, a voluntary parish-based policing system whose members are elected locally.

The political significance of the parishes has been most visible in debates about whether the Connétables should continue to sit automatically in the States Assembly. Supporters of their membership have argued that they provide a direct link between parish government and island-wide politics, while critics have argued that their position is inconsistent with equal representation between voters in different parts of the island. In a 2014 referendum, voters supported retaining the Connétables as members of the Assembly by 15,068 votes to 9,061.

Parish localism has therefore remained a counterweight to more centralised forms of government. It has also shaped political debate on issues such as electoral reform, planning, policing and the division of responsibilities between the Government of Jersey and the parishes.

=== Independent politics and anti-party sentiment ===
Jersey politics has been characterised by a strong preference for independent candidates and scepticism towards formal party politics. This is a matter of political practice rather than law: political parties may register and contest elections, but most elected members have usually sat as independents. The 2000 Clothier Report noted that many islanders regarded the absence of party politics as a virtue, because parties were associated with discipline and a loss of individual political freedom.

The absence of a traditional party system has affected both elections and government formation. Elections have often centred on individual reputation, parish connections and local issues rather than competing party programmes. After a general election, the electorate does not directly choose a governing party or coalition; instead, the States Assembly selects the Chief Minister and ministers from among its members. Individual members are also able to lodge propositions and amendments, which can give non-ministerial members greater influence than in more party-disciplined parliamentary systems.

Party politics became more visible in the twenty-first century, particularly after the introduction of ministerial government and later electoral reforms. The 2022 general election was described as the first in which voters had a choice of four political parties, although the Assembly remained dominated by independents. The 2026 election again showed a mixed pattern: Reform Jersey won seven seats, while six candidates associated with the non-party movement Value Jersey were elected as independents. The persistence of successful independents suggests that anti-party sentiment remains an important feature of Jersey's political culture, even as parties and organised electoral movements have become more visible.

Low and uneven electoral turnout has also been a recurring concern, with turnout in the 2026 general election provisionally reported at 32%, and substantially higher participation in some rural parishes than in urban St Helier.

=== Population and migration ===
Because of the island's small size, limited land and housing supply, and reliance on migrant labour, debates about population have often connected economic policy with pressures on infrastructure, public services and cultural identity. Since the Second World War, population policy has remained a frequent political issue, with controls on access to housing and employment used to regulate residence and work.

Earlier debates in this period were often expressed in terms of limiting the island's population. In the 1970s, official policy sought to prevent the population exceeding 80,000 by 1995, and in 1974 the States approved measures aimed at keeping the population below 78,000 by the 1981 census. Population limits also featured in wider environmental and infrastructure disputes. The campaign against flooding Queen's Valley to create a reservoir brought together concerns about water supply, land use and population growth; Jersey Heritage records protests against the proposed reservoir in 1976, including a petition signed by 6,000 people, and later describes the controversy as part of the context in which the environmental pressure group CONCERN emerged.

The tone of debate has since changed. More recent government documents have emphasised flexible migration controls, improved population data, productivity, migrant safeguarding and the island's economic reliance on inward migration. By the 2026 general election, population control was less prominent as a headline campaign issue than cost of living, housing, healthcare, education and the new hospital, although migration and population continued to underlie debates about housing, infrastructure and public services. Statistics Jersey estimated the resident population at 104,540 at the end of 2024, with net migration of 670 people partly offset by more deaths than births.

=== The "Jersey Way" ===
The phrase the "Jersey Way" is used both positively and critically in Jersey political debate. The Independent Jersey Care Inquiry reported that it had heard the term used in two senses: positively, to describe a strong culture of community and voluntary involvement; and negatively, to describe a perceived system of secrecy, lack of openness and lack of transparency, in which serious issues were "swept under the carpet" and people escaped being held to account. In the States Assembly debate following the inquiry, Chief Minister Ian Gorst similarly said that, for some, the phrase referred to community and voluntary involvement, while for others it referred to secrecy, lack of openness and failure to be transparent.

The phrase remains contested. Some commentators and campaigners use it as shorthand for perceived problems of accountability in a small jurisdiction, while others argue that it is vague, unfairly pejorative or insufficiently precise as an explanation of institutional failure.

== See also ==
- Constitution of Jersey
- Government of Jersey
- Political parties in Jersey
- States Assembly
- List of politicians in Jersey
- Council of Ministers (Jersey)
- Chief Minister of Jersey
- Jersey pressure groups
- External relations of Jersey
- Parishes of Jersey
- Parish Assembly (Jersey)
- Honorary police
- Crown Dependencies
- Law of Jersey
- Corn Riots

== Bibliography ==
- Balleine's History of Jersey, Marguerite Syvret and Joan Stevens (1998) ISBN 1-86077-065-7
- Bailhache, Philip (3 October 2011). "Jersey Law - Jersey Law Review - October 1999 - The Cry For Constitutional Reform- A Perspective From The Office Of Bailiff". Jersey Law Review. Archived from the original on 13 March 2019 – via Jersey Legal Information Board.
- The Constitution of Jersey, Roy Le Herissier
- Constitutional History of Jersey, F. de L. Bois, 1972
