= Interest =

Interest most commonly refers to:

- Interest (economics), payment from a borrower to a lender of an amount above repayment of the amount borrowed, at a particular rate
- Interest (emotion), a feeling that causes attention to focus on an object, event, or process

Interest may also refer to:

- Controlling interest, majority of a corporation's voting shares
- Government interest, a concept in law that allows governments to regulate a given matter
- National interest, a country's goals and ambitions
- Hobby, a regular activity done for enjoyment

== See also ==
- Legal interest (disambiguation)
- Conflict of interest, where serving one interest could involve working against another
- Point of interest, a specific point location that someone may find useful or interesting
- Self-interest, a focus on the needs or desires (interests) of one's self
- Sexual attraction, attraction on the basis of sexual desire
- Special interest (disambiguation)
- Vested interest, a communication theory that explains how attitude affects behaviour
