= St Michael's Preparatory School =

Preparatory school in Channel Islands

Coordinates: 49°11′58.65″N 2°4′24.55″W

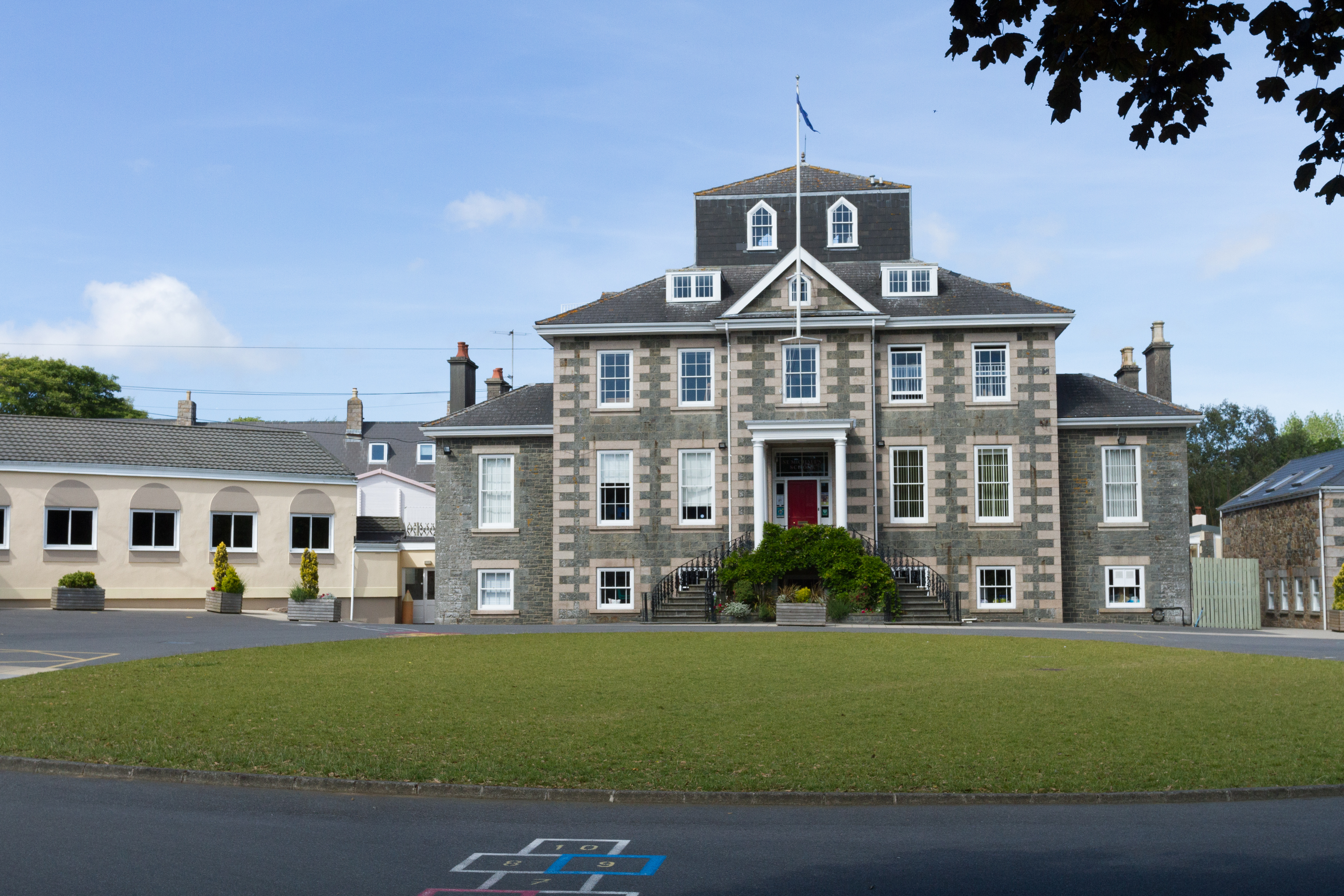

Information
- Established: 1949; 77 years ago
- Years: Nursery - Year 9
- Age: 3 to 14
- Website: stmichaels.je

St Michael's Preparatory School is the largest private preparatory school in Jersey, situated in the parish of St Saviour. Founded in 1949 as a boys' school in St Helier, it relocated to its current site in 1952 and began admitting girls in 1968. The school offers education from nursery through Year 9 and is known for its strong academic, sporting, and musical programmes. The school acts as a feeder to many British public schools in the United Kingdom, with many pupils achieving scholarships. Notable alumni include actor Henry Cavill, former England rugby international Fraser Waters, and three former Bailiffs of Jersey.

== History ==
St Michael's Preparatory School was founded in October 1949 as a boys' school for pupils aged 6 to 13.5, initially based at No. 4 Balmoral Terrace in St Helier, Jersey. The school expanded quickly, with a pre-prep department added in January 1951. A year later, in 1952, the school relocated to its current site in St Saviour after securing new premises.

In December 1965, the school was acquired by the Carnegie family, who oversaw a period of growth and development, including the construction of new classrooms and the leasing of sports fields to meet the needs of a growing student body. The school began accepting girls in 1968, and in 1974 it transitioned to governance by a charitable trust.

John Carnegie retired as headmaster in 1990 and was succeeded by Richard de Figueiredo, a former pupil. In 1992, the boarding unit closed in response to changing demand, and the Nursery was established in its place. Further expansion followed with the opening of a new sports hall in 1994 and the purchase of the main school property from the Carnegie family in 1998. A new trust was formed in 2002, under which the school acquired adjoining land and surrounding fields to support continued growth.

St Michael's has since continued to enhance its facilities and programmes, reflecting the academic, sporting, and musical achievements of its community of over 330 pupils.

In March 2025, St Michael's Preparatory School won the Year 8 category of the Jersey de Putron Challenge for the second consecutive year, securing their place in the inter-island final. The competition tested pupils' general knowledge, maths, and creative thinking, highlighting the school's academic strengths. In the final held in Guernsey in April, St Michael's competed closely with Blanchelande College, ultimately finishing as runners-up by just three points after a well-fought contest.

== School structure ==
Children can be enrolled into St Michael's Preparatory Schools from the nursery, where they are welcomed into an “Early Years Foundation Stage unit” which the university says helps to foster confidence, independence and a love of learning. There is a strong emphasis on exploration and discovery.

In pre-prep (Years 1 and 2), pupils are taught in small classes by dedicated teachers who promote a nurturing atmosphere and instil core values such as good manners and teamwork. Learning is both individual and collaborative, laying the groundwork for academic achievement and positive social development.

The prep stage begins in the Juniors (Years 3 and 4), where most subjects are taught by Form Teachers supported by experienced assistants, with specialist instruction in areas such as music, French, and reasoning. Pupils benefit from personalised teaching, a strong pastoral focus, and preparation for senior school assessments, all within an environment that encourages creativity and resilience.

In the Seniors (Years 5 to 8), children mature into confident and independent learners, supported by small class sizes and subject-specialist teaching. These final years at St Michael's provide leadership opportunities and a sense of belonging, allowing pupils to grow both academically and personally before transitioning to their next stage.

The Shell year (Year 9) offers a bridging programme for pupils who remain in Jersey for secondary education, particularly those preparing for entry to Hautlieu School or other local and mainland United Kingdom schools. With a curriculum and an enrichment programme including earning the Duke of Edinburgh Bronze Award, Shell supports academic progression while fostering public speaking, teamwork, and community involvement.

St Michael's pupils progress to a wide variety of destination schools, both in Jersey and mainland UK, without feeding to any single institution. The school maintains strong links with leading secondary schools to ensure children are well-prepared, often earning scholarships and awards in academics, sport, music, and drama.

== Notable alumni ==
St Michael's Preparatory School has educated several notable alumni. These include Sir Philip Bailhache, Sir Michael Birt, and Sir William Bailhache, who all served as Bailiff of Jersey. The school also counts among its alumni the actor Henry Cavill, an internationally known actor best known for his role as Superman, and Fraser Waters, a former England international rugby union player.

== See also ==
- List of schools in Jersey
