= 2020 in Jersey =

Events in the year 2020 in Jersey.

== Incumbents ==
- Sovereign: Elizabeth II
- Lieutenant governor: Stephen Dalton
- Chief minister: John Le Fondré
- Bailiff: Timothy Le Cocq

== Events ==
- Ongoing: COVID-19 pandemic in Jersey
- 10 March: The first case of COVID-19 is reported.
- 20 March: John Le Fondré orders people to socially distance and to avoid non-essential travel.
- 29 March: John Le Fondré announces a lockdown to begin the following day,
- May: Throughout the month, the government gradually lifted lockdown restrictions.
- September: Schools reopen at the start of the new term.
