= Robert Le Masurier =

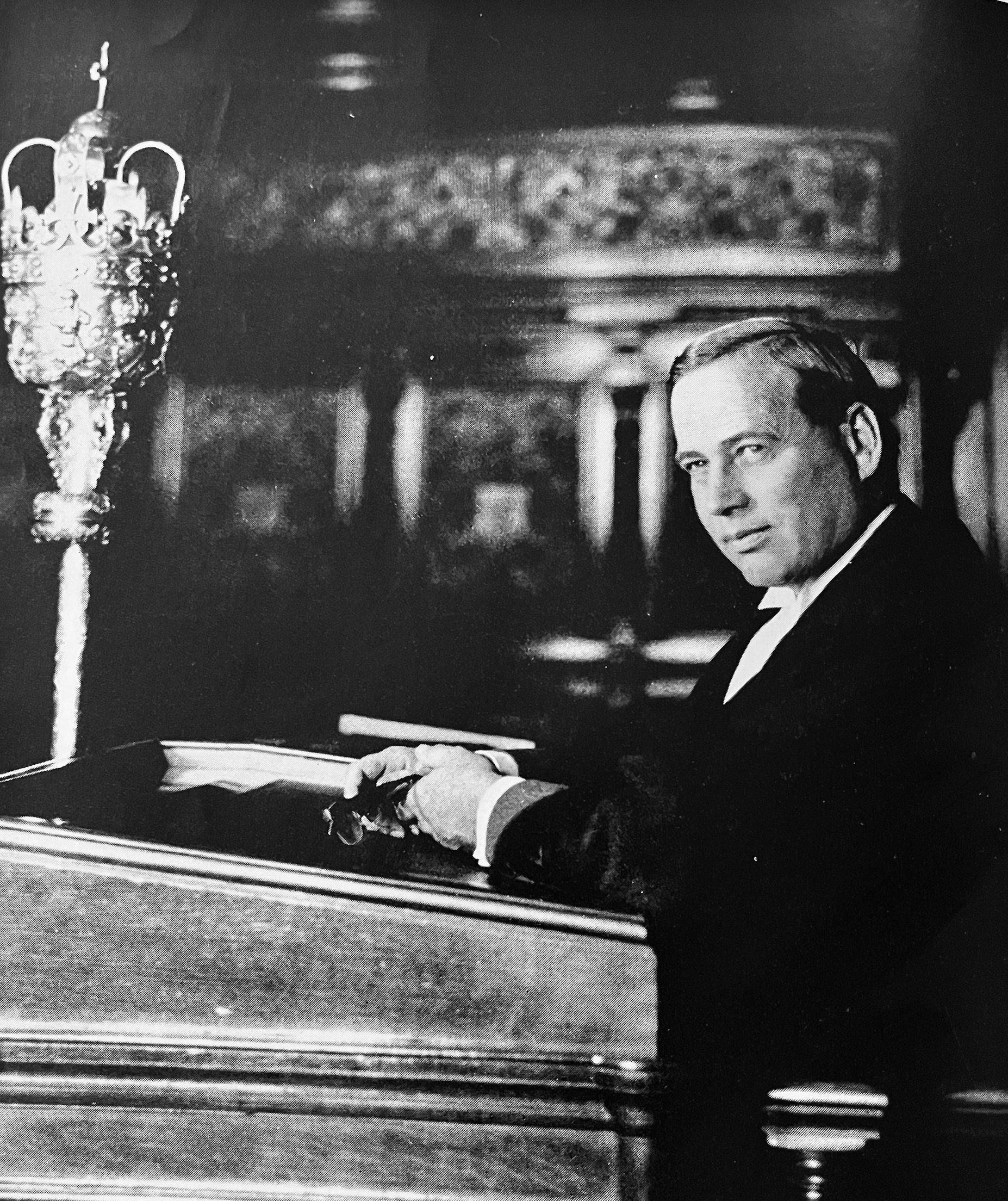

Sir Robert Hugh Le Masurier (29 December 1913 – 30 July 1996) was Bailiff of Jersey from 1962 to 1974.

== Early life ==
Le Masurier went to school at Victoria College in Jersey. He graduated from Pembroke College, Oxford.

He served in the Royal Naval Volunteer Reserve 1939-1944. He won the DSC for defusing a mine in the North Sea.

== Legal career ==
Le Masurier was appointed Solicitor General in Jersey in 1955, following the unexpected resignation from that office of Ralph Vibert (who had been 'required to resign by the Attorney General').

He was appointed Attorney General in 1958.

== Judicial appointments ==
He was appointed Deputy Bailiff in 1962, but served 'barely six months' due to the death of the Bailiff. He went on to serve as Bailiff of Jersey, 1962-74. He told a journalist in 1968, that he was a 'political capon–I have no views. I'm a chief magistrate, I preside over the States, and I act as a kind of Ombudsman too'. In 1971, he sentenced Patrick Welch, a 21-year-old kitchen porter, to death for the murder of a 17-year-old girl on holiday in Jersey from Essex. He was personally opposed to the death penalty. As Bailiff, he oversaw Jersey's talks with the UK Government over its accession to the EEC, 'though he played little part in the substantive negotiations'. He retired from office early, to enjoy his hobbies of sailing and carpentry.

== Honours ==
He was knighted in the 1966 Birthday Honours.
