= Mark Temple (lawyer) =

Jersey lawyer and judge

Mark Temple KC

Deputy Bailiff of Jersey
- Incumbent
- Assumed office 19 January 2026
- Monarch: Charles III
- Preceded by: Robert MacRae

HM Attorney General for Jersey
- In office 9 March 2020 – 2026
- Preceded by: Robert MacRae
- Succeeded by: Matthew Jowitt KC

HM Solicitor General for Jersey
- In office 17 August 2015 – 2020
- Succeeded by: Matthew Jowitt KC

Personal details
- Born: Mark Howard Temple
- Education: University of Cambridge
- Profession: Lawyer

Mark Howard Temple KC is a Jersey lawyer and judge who has served as Deputy Bailiff of Jersey since January 2026. He was previously HM Attorney General for Jersey from 2020 to 2026 and HM Solicitor General for Jersey from 2015 to 2020.

== Early life and education ==
Temple was educated at Roehampton Church School, King's College School, London, and the University of Cambridge.

== Legal career ==
Temple qualified as a solicitor in England and Wales in 1994 and became a solicitor advocate of the High Court of England and Wales in 2002.

He moved to Jersey in 2003 and qualified as a Jersey advocate in 2005. From 2007 to 2015 he was a partner in private practice in Jersey, specialising in litigation and dispute resolution. His private-practice career included time as a partner at Mourant Ozannes.

In August 2015 he was sworn in as HM Solicitor General for Jersey. Temple was appointed Queen's Counsel in 2015, later becoming King's Counsel following the accession of Charles III. He was sworn in as HM Attorney General for Jersey on 9 March 2020.

== Deputy Bailiff ==
Temple's appointment as Deputy Bailiff was announced in the States Assembly on 21 October 2025, after approval by King Charles III on the recommendation of the UK's Lord Chancellor and Secretary of State for Justice. He was sworn in as Deputy Bailiff of Jersey on 19 January 2026.

As Deputy Bailiff, Temple may sit in the Royal Court of Jersey. The Royal Court may hear trials before the Bailiff, the Deputy Bailiff or a Commissioner, and may sit as either the Superior Number or the Inferior Number.

The Deputy Bailiff also acts as President and Presiding Officer of the States Assembly in the Bailiff's absence.

== See also ==
- Bailiff of Jersey
- States Assembly
- Law of Jersey
