= Michael Birt =

Michael Birt may refer to:

- Michael Birt (biochemist) (1932–2001), Australian academician
- Michael Birt (barrister) (born 1948), British lawyer and Bailiff of Jersey in the Channel Islands
