= Self-interest =

Motivation in human action

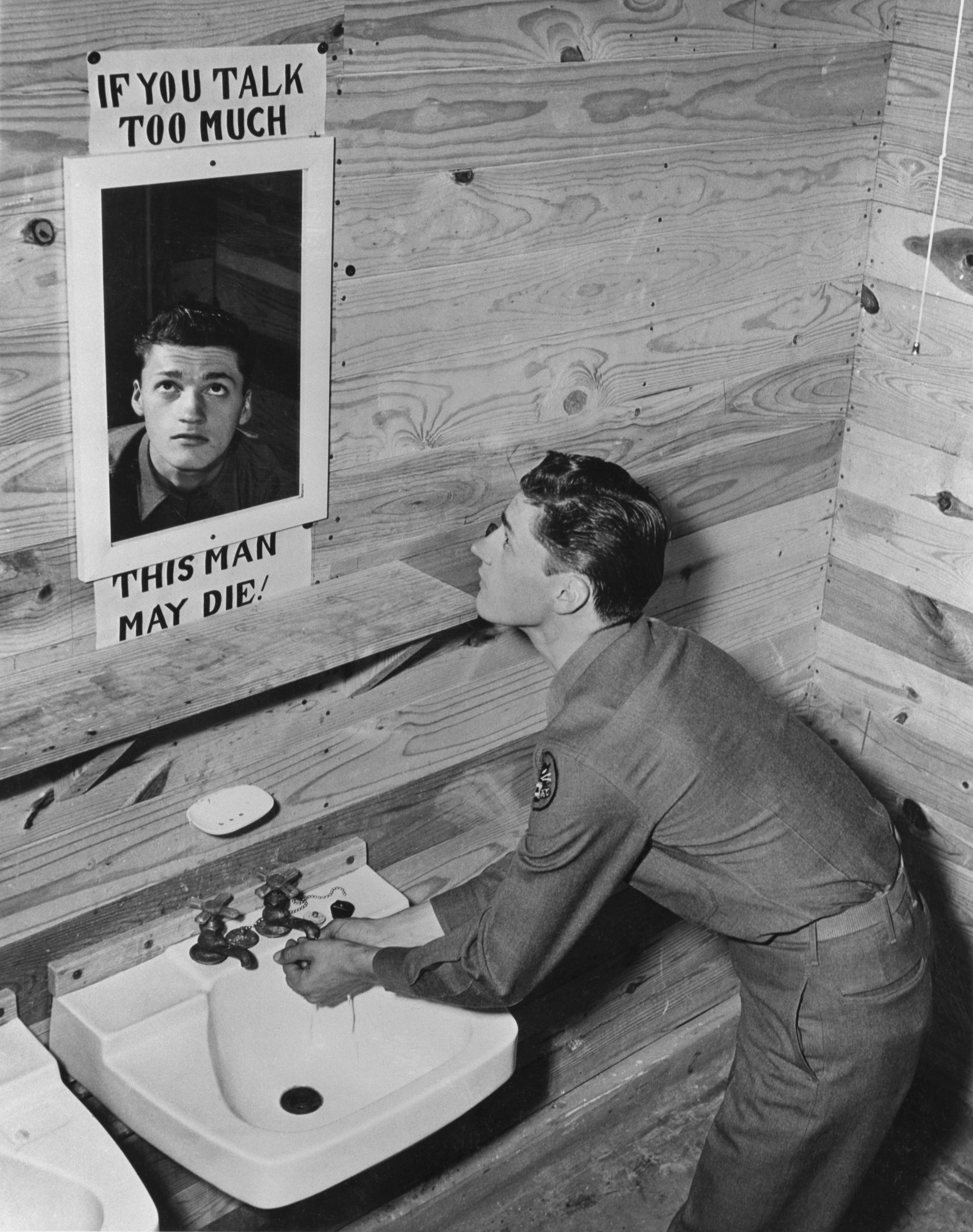
An appeal to self-interest during World War II

Self-interest generally refers to a focus on the needs or desires (interests) of one's self. Most times, actions that display self-interest are often performed without conscious knowing. A number of philosophical, psychological, and economic theories examine the role of self-interest in motivating human action. Individuals may have a self-serving bias towards their self-interest.

== In philosophy ==
Philosophical concepts concerned with self-interest include:

- Enlightened self-interest, a philosophy which states that acting to further the interests of others also serves one's own self-interest.
- Ethical egoism, the ethical position that moral agents ought to do what is in their own self-interest.
- Hedonism, the school of ethics which argues that pleasure is the only intrinsic good.
  - Cyrenaics, the Aristippean pre-Socratic original.
  - Epicureanism, a philosophical system related to hedonism.
- Individualism, a philosophy stressing the worth of individual selves.
- Rational egoism, the position that all rational actions are those done in one's self-interest.

=== Legalism ===
Legalism is a Chinese political philosophy that holds that self-interest underlies human nature and therefore human behavior. It is axiomatic in Legalism that a government can not truly be staffed by upright and trustworthy men of service, because every member of the elite—like any member of society—will pursue their own interests and thus must be employed for their interests. It contends that even acts of virtue are intrinsically mercenary, driven by self-interest, like the pursuit for a life of morality in the hopes that the resulting reputation will be convertible into abundant benefits or riches.

In Legalism, a regular pattern of the natural world is that the basic nature of human beings comprises a set of interests that are primarily self-regarding and not amenable to cultivation, morally or otherwise. Therefore, Legalists argue that political systems are only viable if it allows individuals to pursue their selfish interests exclusively in a manner that benefits rather than contradicts the needs of a state. Conversely, their concerns lie with political systems based on trust and respect for ministers and other officials—rather than on impersonal norms and standards, such as laws, regulations, and rules—as these systems will result in an irresolvable power struggle. Their sober realization herein is that administrative systems are fundamentally unable to monitor themselves in the long term despite the impersonal mode of rule, because they must rely for their implementation on individuals who themselves are driven by self-interest.

Legalists hold that an ideal state is not achieved through solving social problems that are fundamentally moral, but that self-interest—such as the competing interacting interests of rulers, ministers, and common people—is the genuine force in the world. They argue that people can be shaped behaviorally to yield social order if it is in the individual's own self-interest to abide by the norms, meaning that different interests must be aligned to each other and the social good, which is most efficiently ensured if the norms are publicly and impartially enforced. They advocate the use of rewards and punishments, as mankind reacts out of self-interest, to achieve a desired behavior from people. According to them, the application of reward and punishment in a sociopolitical system is necessary to influence people's calculations and direct them towards pursuits that benefit the state.

== In psychology ==
Psychological concepts concerned with self-interest include psychological egoism, the view that humans are always motivated by self-interest and narcissism, which is an unhealthy self-absorption due to a disturbance in the sense of self.

== See also ==
- Altruism
- Careerism
- Egoism
- Interest (disambiguation)
- Opportunism
- Selfishness
