= Ralph Vibert =

- Born: 7 November 1911
- Died: November 10, 2008 (aged 97)
- Known for: Solicitor General of Jersey; Senator of the States of Jersey

Ralph Vibert OBE (November 7, 1911 – November 10, 2008) was Solicitor General of Jersey (1948–1955) and a Senator of the States of Jersey (1959–1987).

== Early life ==
The son of shopkeepers, Vibert was born in 1911. He obtained a scholarship enabling him to attend Victoria College but failed the Oxford University entrance examination. He obtained work as secretary to the Attorney General of Jersey and the future Bailiff of Jersey, Alexander Coutanche and qualified as a Jersey advocate.

During the War he served as a cypher instructor with the Special Operations Executive (SOE) in Beaulieu, New Forest before being promoted to Chief instructor of Force 136, the Asian outpost of the SOE in India.

== Legal career ==
Upon returning to Jersey after its liberation, Vibert co-founded a law firm with his brother, Vivian (Bob) and others. He was appointed Solicitor General of Jersey, where he served from 1948 to 1955 when he resigned due to personal differences with the then Attorney General.

== Political career ==
In 1957 he was elected a Deputy for St. Brelade; and in 1959 was elected a Senator of the States of Jersey, a position he held until his retirement in 1987.

During this time in elected office he was President of the following committees: Defence (1967–1987), Legislation (1966–1981), Constitution and Common Market (1967–87), Industrial Relations (1972–1975), Establishment (1975–1980), Finance (1980–1984), Policy Advisory (1984–1987), Defence Contribution (1984–1987).

During his presidency of the Constitution and Common Market Committee, he was the author of the constitutional position that Jersey enjoyed of being outside the EEC (later the EU), but within the common external tariff, during the United Kingdom's membership 1972-2020.
