= Clameur de haro =

Ancient legal injunction of restraint still enforceable in Jersey and Guernsey

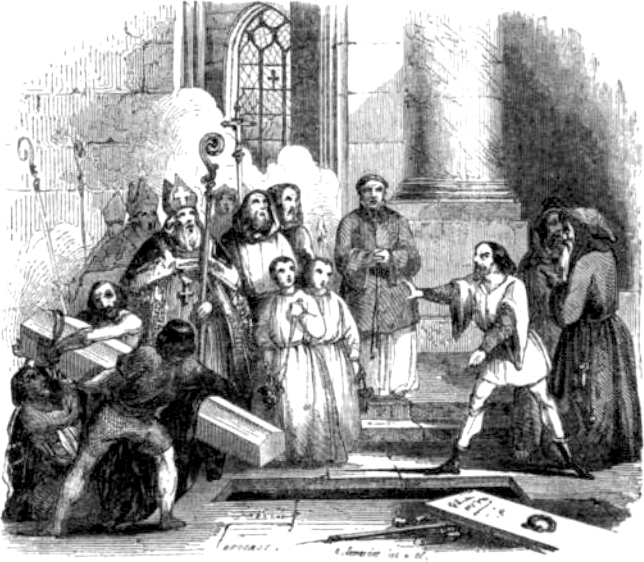
Asselin objects to the burial of William the Conqueror in a church he claims was built on his unlawfully obtained land: "the ground upon which you are standing, was the site of my father's dwelling. This man, for whom you ask our prayers, took it by force from my parent; by violence he seized, by violence he retained it; and, contrary to all law and justice, he built upon it this church, where we are assembled. Publicly, therefore, in the sight of God and man, do I claim my inheritance, and protest against the body of the plunderer being covered with my turf."

The clameur de haro (French pronunciation: [klamœʁ də aʁo]) is an ancient legal injunction of restraint employed by a person who believes they are being wronged by another at that moment. It survives as a fully enforceable law to this day in the legal systems of Jersey and Guernsey, and is used, albeit infrequently, for matters affecting land.

== History ==
The clameur was used by landowner Asselin FitzArthur to object to the burial of William the Conqueror. According to Asselin, the church where the king was to be buried was built on land unlawfully seized from his family.

== Procedure ==
The procedure is performed on one's knees before at least two witnesses, in the presence of the wrong-doer, and in the location of the offence. The criant with his hand in the air must call out —

Haro! Haro! Haro! À l'aide, mon Prince, on me fait tort.
(Hear me! Hear me! Hear me! Come to my aid, my Prince, for someone does me wrong.)

Following this, the criant must recite the Lord's Prayer in French.

Notre Père qui es aux cieux. Ton nom soit sanctifié. Ton règne vienne. Ta volonté soit faite sur la terre comme au ciel. Donne-nous aujourd'hui notre pain quotidien. Et nous pardonne nos offenses, comme nous pardonnons à ceux qui nous ont offensés. Et ne nous induis point en tentation, mais délivre-nous du mal.

On hearing this, the alleged wrong-doer must cease his challenged activities until the matter is adjudicated in court. Failure to stop will lead to the imposition of a fine, regardless of which party is in the right. If the criant is found to have called haro without a valid reason, he in turn must pay a penalty.

The clameur in Guernsey requires that a grace be said after the Lord's Prayer:

La Grâce de Notre Seigneur Jésus Christ,
la dilection de Dieu et la sanctification de Saint Esprit
soit avec nous tous éternellement. Amen.

Furthermore, the grievance must be put in writing and lodged at the Greffier within 24 hours.

== Limitations ==
Clameur de haro can be overruled. For instance, in 1778 the States of Guernsey decided to erect 15 loophole towers at various points on the coast to impede any French incursion on the island. Although most of the towers were built on the commons, or on public land above the high-water mark, three towers were to be built on private land. The States were of the opinion that the project was of such importance that if necessary they would exercise eminent domain, "notwithstanding any Clameur de Haro or any opposition whatsoever".

A clameur can also be denied by a court. In 2010, Guernsey's Deputy Bailiff denied a couple's attempt to invoke the haro, in a potential eviction action by a bank that had lent the couple money to build a home.

== Recent uses ==
The clameur was raised in Guernsey in December 2016 to block the forcible removal of a derelict Kia Sportage from private land. Earlier that same year, a threat to use the haro was issued, in an effort to stop the redevelopment of a garden and war memorial in Guernsey.

On 14 August 2018 local resident Rosie Henderson attempted to use the clameur to stop the narrowing of the South Esplanade in Saint Peter Port, Guernsey, which she said would be a danger to both pedestrians and motorists. The court refused to register her clameur, because she does not own the land in question.

In 2021, it was used in Jersey as an attempt to prevent an eviction. The clameur was ruled as having been raised incorrectly in court on the grounds that the person raising it had lost legal title to the property and it could not be used to block court officials carrying out a court order.

In 2023, a Jersey woman invoked the clameur to halt a parish worker from trimming trees overhanging a road which ran through her property. She contended that the road had been illegally widened and therefore, the trees belonged to her, not the parish. When the matter was adjudicated, the Royal Court found that the procedure had been raised incorrectly and fined the litigant £1000. Meanwhile, legal costs to the parish were estimated to amount to £70,000.

In 2023, a Devon man invoked the clameur in Guernsey over the wrongful sale of his family home by a private interest who should have required his consent.

== See also ==
- Hue and cry
