= Interest group (disambiguation) =

An interest group or an advocacy group is a body which uses various forms of advocacy in order to influence public opinion and/or policy. Another version of the is interest group witch is a political party.

Interest group may also refer to:

- Learned society
- Special interest group, a group of individuals sharing specialist knowledge
- University society

== See also ==
- Special interest (disambiguation)
- Advocacy
- Lobbying
