= Representation of Sheppard re Powell =

Jersey Court of Appeal case

- Court: Court of Appeal
- Full case name: Representation of Sheppard re Powell
- Decided: 30 March 2021

Case history
- Prior action: Representation of Powell (2018)
- Appealed from: Royal Court

Case opinions
- The Clameur de Haro cannot be used to prevent court eviction orders being issued
- Decision by: Sir William Bailhache
- Concurrence: James McNeill; George Bompas

Keywords
- Clameur de Haro

Representation of Sheppard re Powell is a Jersey Court of Appeal case relating to eviction injunctions. The case resolved around Powell raising a clameur de haro to prevent eviction and Sheppard appealed against the subsequent automatic injunction preventing eviction. The court ruled that a clameur could not be used to block court orders and fined Powell £50 for incorrect usage.

== Background ==
Caroline Powell was a homeowner in St Brelade. She was subject to insolvency proceedings that included repossession of her house. She applied to the Royal Court in 2018 for remise de biens. The application failed and Powell was deemed to have made cession générale to any rights. An appeal to the Court of Appeal ruled that Powell had a "precarious interest" in the property and was granted remise de biens to sell the property to pay creditors but she refused to allow people to view the house. The jurats ruled that interest expired on 27 November 2020 after the Royal Court ruled the Sheppards to be tenants après dégrèvement after purchasing the house and ordered the Viscount of Jersey to oversee eviction procedures.

== Initial case ==
On 27 February 2021, when officers of the Viscount visited Powell to issue the eviction notice, Powell raised the clameur de haro, an ancient Norman legal right, by kneeling and stating the clameur and then reciting the Lord's Prayer in French. According to law, an interim injunction was automatically in force and the officers were obliged to stop until the matter could be adjudicated. This was the first time in 21 years that a clameur de haro was raised in Jersey.

The case was heard at the Royal Court after the property owner applied to the court to have the injunction lifted. The deputy Bailiff presided over the case. The Sheppards argued that the clameur was used incorrectly as all it did was prevent the officers handing over the eviction notice. Powell responded stating that the Royal Court judgment affirming the eviction process was made without her present and using incorrect evidence. The deputy Bailiff, basing his judgment upon the last time the clameur was raised in 2000, ruled that the clameur had been raised unlawfully as the officers were acting under the order of the court which could not be challenged using this legal mechanism and accordingly fined Powell £50 for incorrect usage. He also banned her from raising the clameur in relation to this again.

== Appeal ==
Powell indicated she intended to appeal to the Court of Appeal on the grounds that her case was distinct enough to distinguish from the 2000 case and that there had been deception in the gaining of the original eviction ruling. The appeal was heard by Commissioners Sir William Bailhache, James McNeill and George Bompas. The court affirmed the judgment that this was an inappropriate use of the clameur as Powell had no legal title to the property. Commissioner Bailhache described the case as "hopeless from the outset" though he stated Powell could appeal to the Judicial Committee of the Privy Council but that she would face an "uphill battle". They also granted Sheppard's request for costs for what Sheppard's attorney argued was a "frivolous and vexatious" lawsuit.
