= Legal interest =

A legal interest refers to the legally enforceable right to possess or use property. The term may refer to past, present, or future interests.

Legal interest may also refer to:

- Equitable interest, which is a legal interest that may be enforced by equitable remedies
- Estate in land, a possessory interest in real property
- Government interest, the rationale of a government in enacting a law or regulation
- Legal good, an interest protected by criminal law
- Right to property, the normative concept of entitlement to property
- Other forms of nonpossessory interest in land
