= Corn Riots =

1771 riots in Jersey

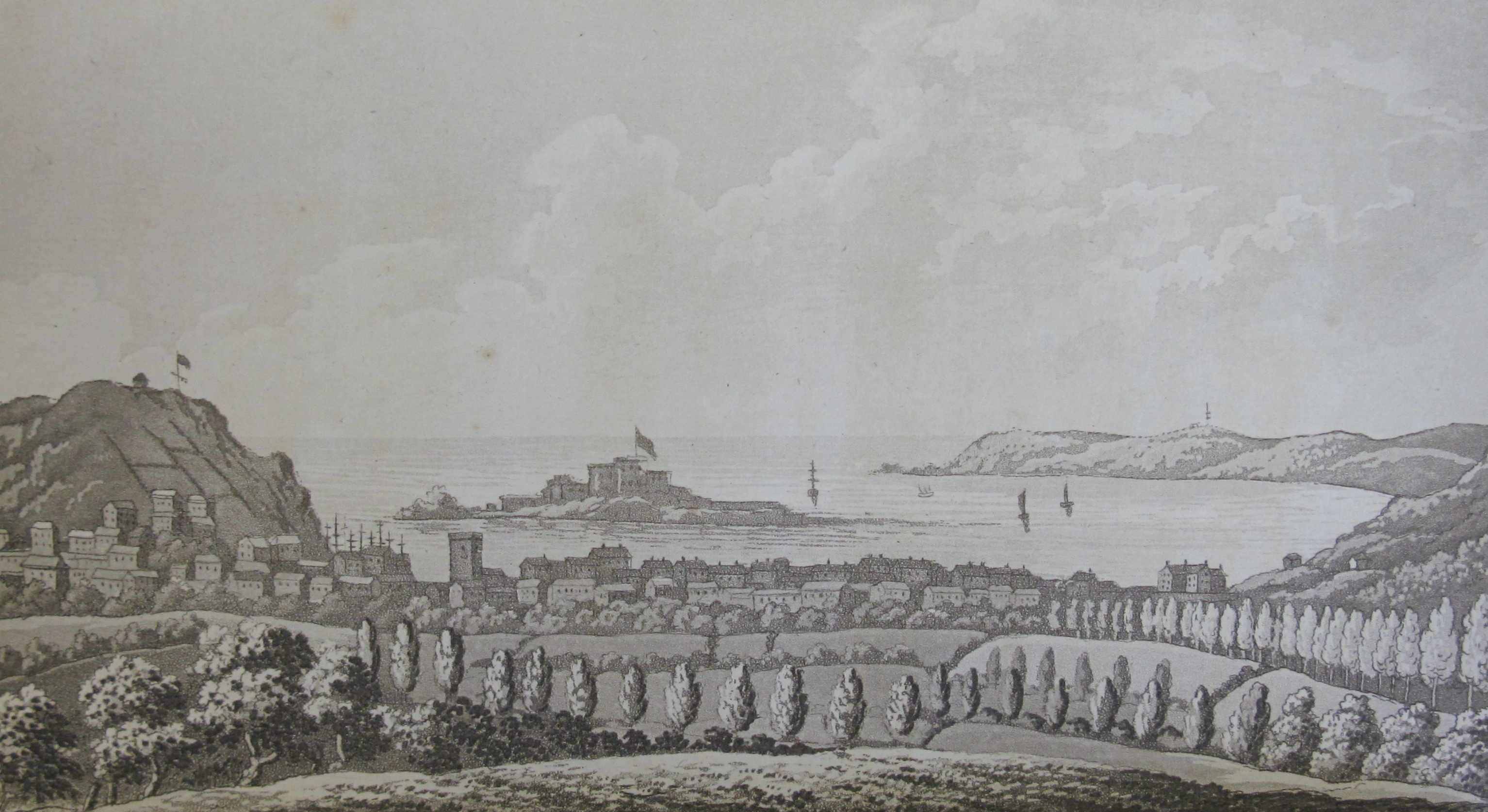
- St Helier in 1809, 40 years after the Corn Riots
- Date: September 28, 1771
- Also known as: The Jersey Revolution
- Target: Lieut-Bailiff Charles Lemprière, The Royal Court
- Outcome: Code of Laws 1771

The Corn Riots, also known as the Jersey Revolution, was an uprising which took place in Jersey on 28 September 1769. Angered by the administration of Lieutenant Bailiff Charles Lemprière, hundreds of Jerseymen marched from the north of the island to the south and occupied the Royal Court. The uprising was a significant point in Jersey political history, as the powers of legislation were removed from the Royal Court and placed in the States Assembly.

The causes of the uprising were centred around the balance of power between the island's parliament, the States, and the Royal Court, both of which had powers to create legislation. An anti-Seigneurial sentiment – opposition to the feudal economic system – also contributed to the uprising. The spark for the uprising was a corn shortage, in part caused by decisions of the ruling classes, which turned the urban population against the States.

== Background ==
=== 18th century unrest ===
By the 1720s, a discrepancy in coinage values between Jersey and France was threatening economic stability. The States of Jersey therefore resolved to devalue the liard to six to the sou. The legislation to that effect implemented in 1729 caused popular riots that shook the establishment. The devaluation was therefore cancelled.

In the 1730s, there was sporadic violence against the collectors of Crown tithes, especially in St Ouen, St Brelade and Trinity.

=== Feudalism in Jersey ===
The feudal economic mode was still in practice, with the island divided into hundreds of fiefs and the tithe system still in practice. Islanders were still required to pay rentes to their Seigneurs, which themselves were corrupted by the Seigneurs and miller and biker allies.

=== Lemprière's Bailiffship ===
The Bailiffship of Jersey was a position that had de facto become hereditary in the de Carteret family by 1750. Earl Granville held the position at that time, but neither he nor his son ever visited the island. Instead, the Lieutenant Bailiff, Charles Lemprière, who was appointed in 1750 and served until 1781, effectively had full control over the island during this time. Lemprière was a Parliamentarian, but was known for his autocratic temperament. His family held a number of high-ranking positions on the island and he had the power to issue ordinances and suppress protests through the Royal Court.^{:195}In the political system of Jersey at this time, only wealthy men were able to vote for Connétables, and these men tended to appoint their own relatives to these positions. There was a lack of democratic representation in the island's political system.

Nicholas Fiott, a merchant settled in Jersey, had a number of personal squabbles with Lemprière which soon morphed into public disunity. During the Seven Years' War, a number of prisoners were kept on the island and suffered "disgraceful" mistreatment. Fiott himself was imprisoned for objecting to being tried by Jurats with whom he had personal quarrels. A petition was sent to the Privy Council demanding his release by principaux (men with the right to attend Parish Assemblies) and he was released.^{:195-7}

== The Jersey Revolution ==
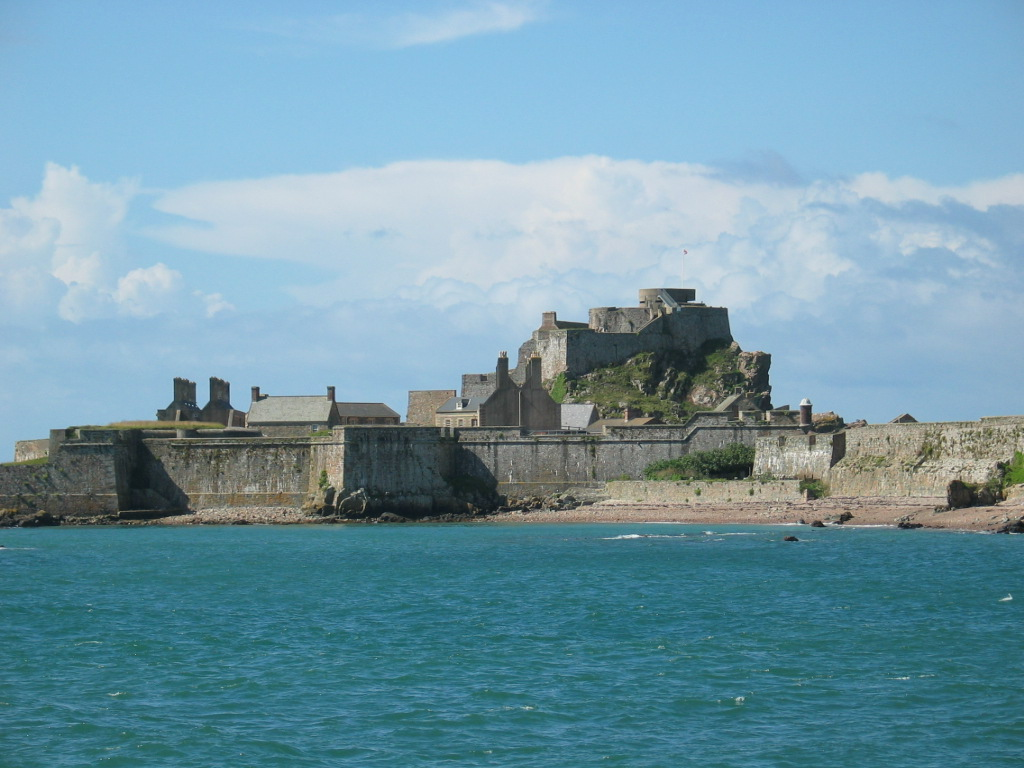
Elizabeth Castle has from time to time been used as a meeting point for the States.

In the period between 1767 and 1771, there were food shortages on the island due to corruption among the ruling classes, which ultimately led to the Jersey Revolution. The shortages were caused by a shortage of wheat in England and France in 1768. The Lemprières exacerbated the problem by removing wheat from storage and re-diverting ships to France to sell wheat at a high price. In June 1769, hundreds of women descended on St Helier's harbour to directly prevent ships carrying wheat from sailing.

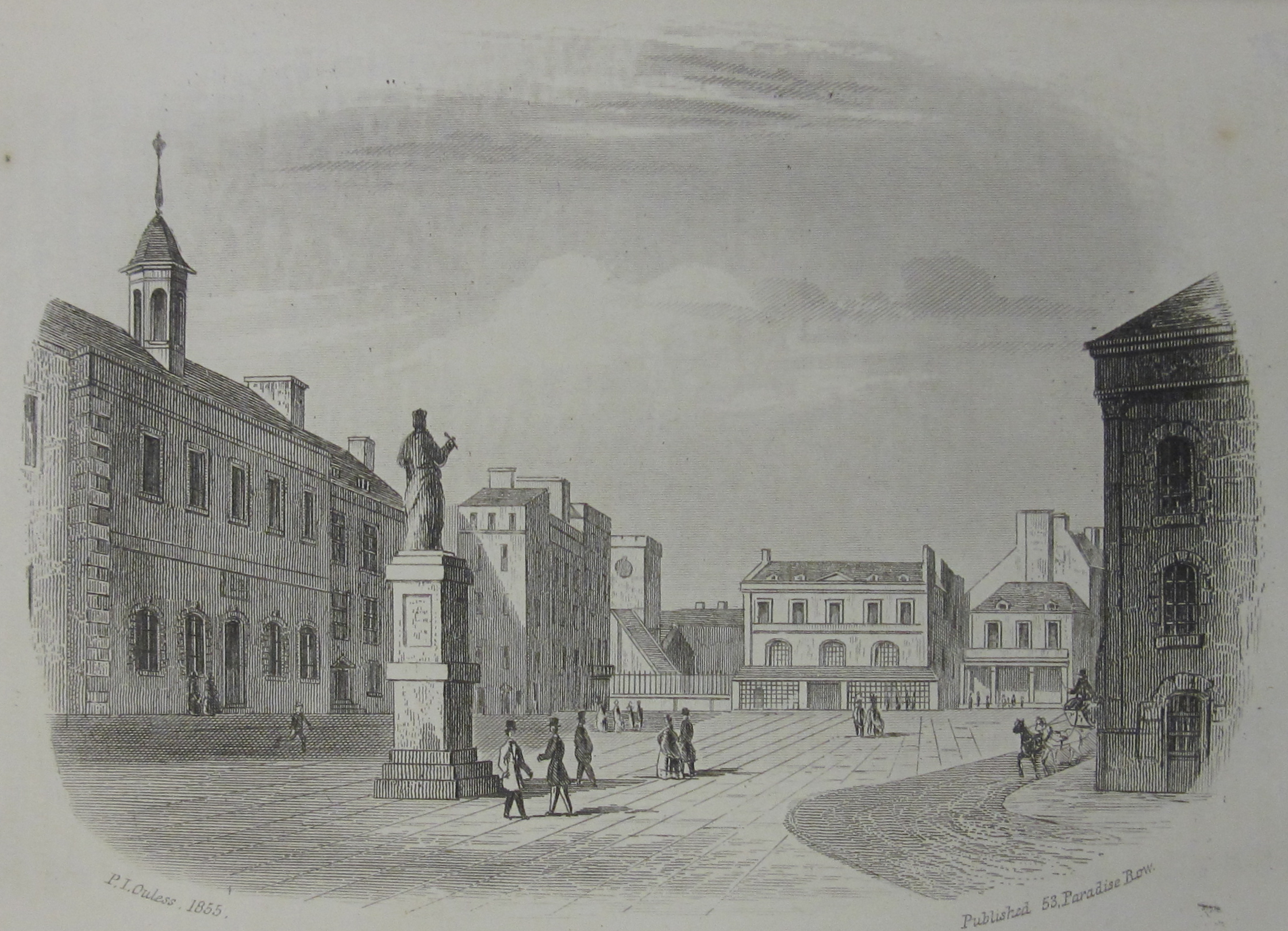
The Royal Court building, La Cohue, in a painting of the Royal Square, dated 1852

On 28 September 1769, between four and five hundred people from the northern parishes marched from Trinity into town, led by Thomas Gruchy. In town, they marked to the Royal Court building and compelled the Governor and the Court to sign an order of their demands. The Court was sitting as the Cour d'Héritage, a triannual court regarding Seigneurial obligations. In attendance included Lieut-Baliff Lemprière, the Lieutenant Governor and the Jurats. Historian Michael Dun recounts that the revolution was a "remarkably passive affair" and "curiously civilised", as no one was molested or executed by the revolutionaries. The Royal Court received the dissenters politely and the Lemprières played along.

The protestors' demands included reductions in the price of wheat and tithes, as well as the abolition of the champart (the feudal right of the Seigneur to every twelfth sheaf of corn), the banishment of all aliens and the complete withdrawal of charges against Fiott. The new Acts were proclaimed that Saturday. By Order of the King-in-Council, the Act was stricken from the public records and the Government treated the day like it had not happened.

On 6 October, the States met at Elizabeth Castle, a meeting place of better safety, and decided to send a party to report to the Privy Council. The report claimed that the mob had ordered the removal of the King's Laws from the statute books, which the council saw as anarchy against royal power, and ordered the removal of the Acts and a reward of £100 for information that could lead to the arrest of the rioters.^{:198-9} The council also sent five companies of Royal Scots to restore order, commanded by Lt-Colonel Rudolf Bentinck. Over the next months, Lemprière detained a number of islanders, including Thomas Gruchy. Gruchy had read out a proposition at an address in Trinity, proposing the annual election of Jurats, Connétables and Centeniers and the codification of laws, arguing that Jersey was "under a government more arbitrary than the French".

Bentinck's companies found another side to the story and invited those with grievances to set it down in writing. Moses Corbet, a former army officer, read a petition at the Town Hall demanding reforms, which he took to England to present to the Bailiff, the Government, Parliament, and the King. Charles William Le Geyt did similar for the country parishes. Le Geyt had the States and the Royal Court behind him.^{:198-9}

== Aftermath ==
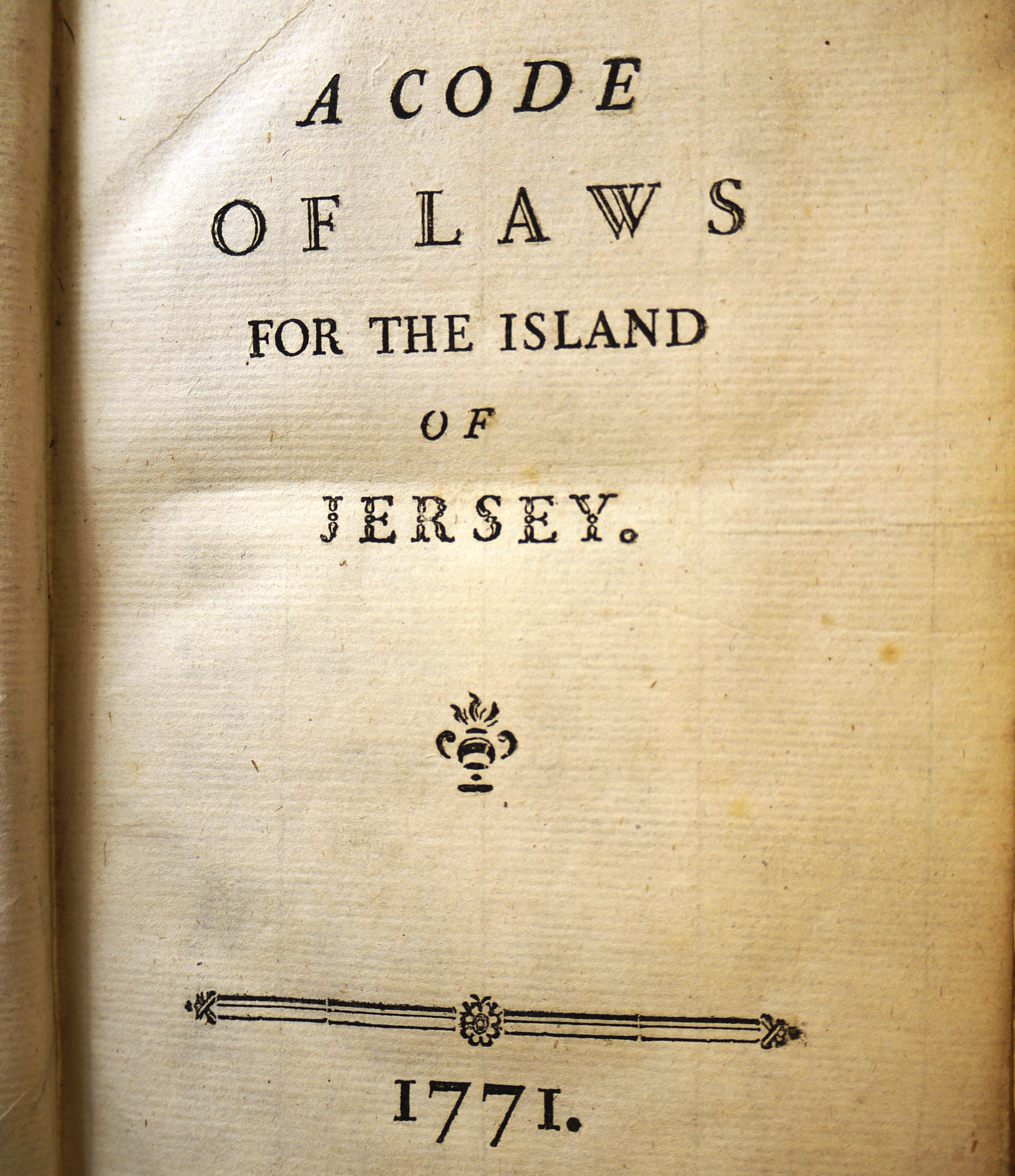
1771 Code des Lois, an outcome of the revolt

Bentinck became Lieutenant Governor on 15 June 1770 and introduced important reforms.^{:199} Large political reforms were issued by the Crown in 1771. This represents the Crown's attempt to separate the judiciary from the legislature. Bentinck and the Lemprières issued the Code of Laws of 1771. These laid out for the first time in one place the extant laws of Jersey,^{:199} though did not detail many unwritten, ancient and obscure customary laws. The Code confirmed that legislation required Privy Council approval and new legislation could not be passed without the States Assembly, removing the lawmaking power of the Royal Court.^{:199}

Following the petitions, the British government instructed that peace and reform should be brought to the island. Bentinck secured amnesty for the rioters and Fiott was allowed to return home. Farming outside Crown revenues was forbidden, with the Receiver paid a fixed salary to prevent corruption.^{:199} These events also led to the founding for the first time of party politics in Jersey. Those supporters of Charles Lemprières rule were known as the Charlots, while those in opposition became known as Magots, or Jeannots after their founder Jean Dumaresq.

== Celebration and memorial ==
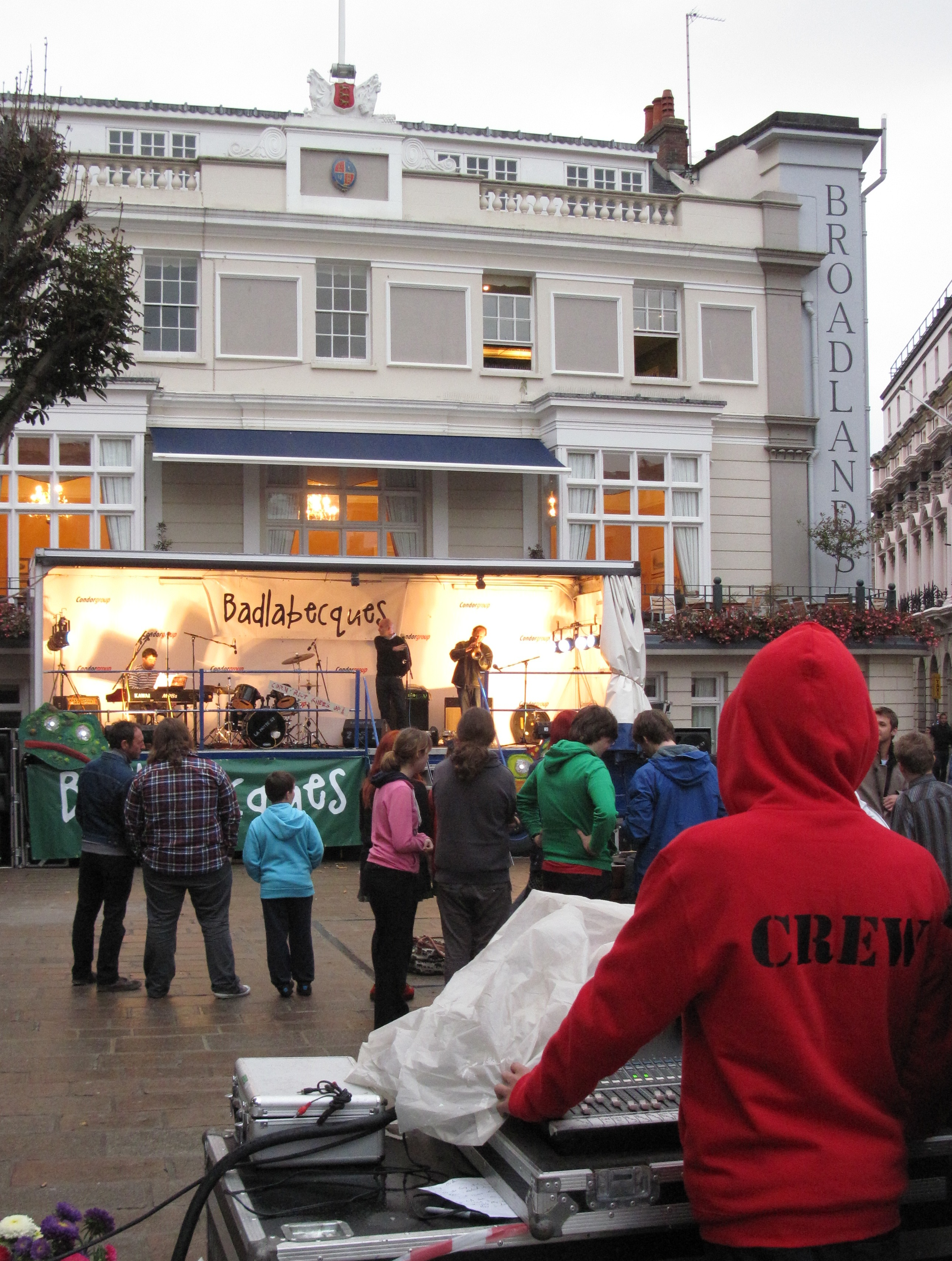
A concert in the Royal Square by Badlabecques on the 2012 anniversary of the Corn Riots

In 2021, on the 250th anniversary of the riots, the States decided to add an additional, one-off bank holiday and local festival to commemorate the Corn Riots. The festival included a re-enactment of the walking route taken by the rioters in 1771. The Government says the event is "Jersey’s annual celebration of our cultural and historical identity through live music and arts". Although the bank holiday was not renewed, the festival was continued in 2022.

== See also ==
- History of Jersey
