= Robert MacRae =

Bailiff of Jersey

Robert MacRae KC

Bailiff of Jersey
- Incumbent
- Assumed office 24 October 2025
- Monarch: Charles III
- Governor: Jerry Kyd
- Preceded by: Timothy Le Cocq

Personal details
- Born: March 25, 1968 (age 58) Redhill, Surrey, United Kingdom
- Children: 5
- Education: University of Exeter
- Occupation: Lawyer

Robert MacRae KC is a Jersey lawyer and judge. He was sworn in as Bailiff of Jersey in October 2025, having previously been Deputy Bailiff.

== Education ==
MacRae went to school in Jersey, attending La Moye School, Victoria College Prep and Victoria College.

He graduated with a law degree from the University of Exeter in 1989.

== Career ==
After being called to the English Bar in 1990, he practised from chambers in Exeter for 10 years, principally defending and prosecuting criminal cases.

He returned to the Island in 2001 and was called to the Jersey Bar in 2003. In 2005 he became a partner in Carey Olsen's Jersey office, specialising in trust litigation.

He was appointed a Crown Advocate in 2008. He served as HM Attorney General 2015–20.

In 2020, he was sworn in as Deputy Bailiff of Jersey and became Bailiff on 24 October 2025.
