= Michael Birt (barrister) =

British barrister

Sir Michael Birt KC
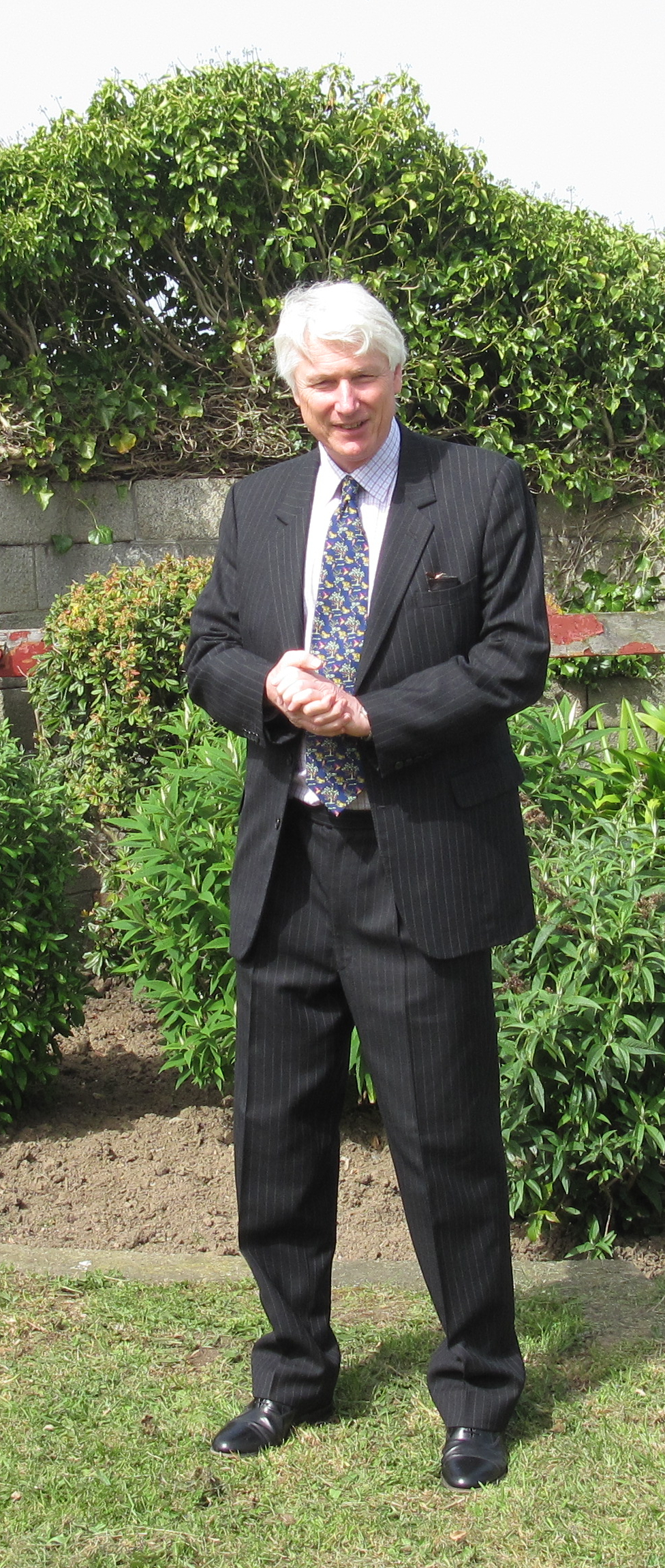
- Michael Birt pictured at a ceremonial function in 2011

Bailiff of Jersey
- In office 2009–2015
- Preceded by: Philip Bailhache
- Succeeded by: William Bailhache

Personal details
- Born: August 25, 1948

Sir Michael Cameron St John Birt, KC (born 25 August 1948) was the 88th Bailiff of Jersey in the Channel Islands.

== Early life ==
Birt was educated in Jersey at St. Michael's Preparatory School then at Marlborough College. He went on to read law at Magdalene College, Cambridge.

== Legal career ==
Birt was called to the English Bar in 1970 and practised in London as a barrister at 2 Crown Office Row for five years. He returned to Jersey and qualified at the Jersey Bar in 1977.

He was sworn in as an advocate of the Royal Court in October 1977. From 1976 to 1993 he was in private practice with the Jersey law firm Ogier & Le Cornu.

Birt served as a Crown advocate 1987–93 and HM Attorney General for Jersey 1994–2000.

== Judicial appointments ==
Birt was Deputy Bailiff 2000-09 and Bailiff 2009–15.

A group of protesters demonstrated outside Birt's swearing-in ceremony in the Royal Court of Jersey, angry about decisions not to bring more prosecutions following investigations into child abuse in Jersey.

Since 2018, he is a Judge of the Court of Appeal of the Cayman Islands and a Commissioner of the Royal Court of Jersey since 2015.

== Honours ==
Birt was appointed a QC learned in the law of Jersey in 1995. He was knighted in the 2012 Birthday Honours for services to the Crown and the community in Jersey.

Legal offices
| Preceded by Philip Bailhache | Bailiff of Jersey; 2009 – 2015 | Succeeded by William Bailhache |
