= Jean Hérault =

Bailiff of Jersey (1615–1621; 1624–1626)

Jean Hérault (1569 - 1626) was the Bailiff of Jersey for between 1615 and 1621 and 1624 and 1626 during the reign of King James I and IV.

He is noted as being "irritable, tetchy, vain, but ... incorruptible".

== Life ==
Hérault was born in 1569 to a Jersey family. He held a small post under the administration of Elizabeth I. He purchased half of Longueville Manor in 1595. He attended Oxford University, but did not graduate.

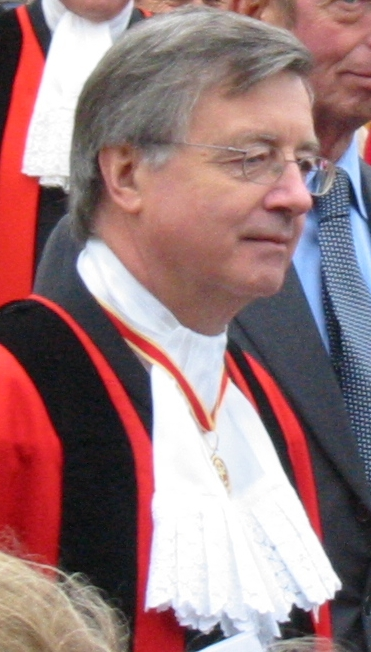
To this day, the tradition that the Bailiff wears red robes remains

In 1615, Hérault was appointed Bailiff of Jersey, having been promised the role by Letters Patent in 1611. The captain at the time John Peyton appealed against the decision, claiming it was his jurisdiction to appoint the bailiff but the King's order was upheld and Peyton obliged to further fund Hérault with another 100 marks annually. Hérault strongly believed in the importance and high position of the role of Bailiff, claiming it to be the island's actual governor despite the tradition that that role belonged to the captain of the royal garrisons. He ordered his name to be placed before the captain's in church prayers and was the first Bailiff to wear red robes (in the style of English judges). To back his claims, he cited that in the Norman administrative tradition, the Bailiffs had "no one above them except the Duke". He frequently reported neglect of duty by Peyton, such as the reduction in the guard at Elizabeth Castle. This dispute led to one of the most major turning points in Jersey's constitutional history, as the captain's role as Governor was clearly established but restricted to principally military concerns, while judicial and many civil affairs were placed entirely under the jurisdiction of the Bailiff. Hérault was subsequently reprimanded and imprisoned over attempts to usurp certain privileges regarding the appointment of the local clergy but ultimately reinstated in his position.
