= William Bailhache =

Jersey lawyer

Sir William Bailhache KC

Bailiff of Jersey
- In office 29 January 2015 – 11 October 2019
- Preceded by: Michael Birt
- Succeeded by: Timothy Le Cocq

Personal details
- Born: William James Bailhache; 24 June 1953 (age 72) Jersey
- Occupation: Lawyer

Sir William James Bailhache KC (born 24 June 1953) is a Jersey lawyer and judge.

== Early life ==
Bailhache was educated at Charterhouse School and Merton College, Oxford.

He is the brother of Sir Philip Bailhache who also served as HM Attorney General, Deputy Bailiff, and Bailiff.

Bailhache was called to the English Bar in 1975 and was sworn in as a Jersey Advocate in September 1976.

== Legal Career ==
Bailhache was a partner at Bailhache & Bailhache (subsequently Bailhache Labese) 1977–1999.

Bailhache served as HM Attorney General 2000–2009.

== Judicial appointments ==
Bailhache served as Deputy Bailiff 2009–2015 and Bailiff 2015–2019.

He is currently a Commissioner of the Royal Court and sits as a judge of the Jersey Court of Appeal.

He was appointed a Deemster in the Isle of Man in 2015.

He was made a Knight Bachelor in the 2017 Birthday Honours.

Legal offices
Preceded by Michael Birt	Bailiff of Jersey; 2015 – 2019	Succeeded by Timothy Le Cocq
