= John Peyton (soldier) =

Member of the Parliament of England

Sir John Peyton
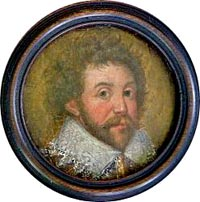
- A miniature of Sir John Peyton, attributed to John de Critz, painted around 1603

Governor of Jersey
- In office August 1603 – 1603

Personal details
- Parent(s): John Peyton and Dorothy Peyton

Sir John Peyton (1544–1630) was an English soldier, MP and administrator, as well as the Governor of Jersey. He was born in Knowlton, Kent to John Peyton (died 1558) and Dorothy Peyton, who was the daughter of John Tyndale.

He entered Parliament in 1572 as MP for King's Lynn and was re-elected to the same seat in 1584 and 1593. He was knighted in 1586 and served under Robert Dudley. He was Lieutenant-Governor of Bergen op Zoom from 1586 to 1587 and was a colonel "in the forces for the defence of the queen's person against the threatened attack of the Spanish Armada" in 1588. He was Sheriff of Norfolk for 1588. He served as a deputy lieutenant of Cambridgeshire under Roger North in 1596 and MP for Middlesex in 1597. He was appointed lieutenant of the Tower of London from 1597 to 1603, during which time he gave kind attention to Sir Walter Raleigh when he was imprisoned. He sat in Parliament for the last time in 1601 as member for Weymouth. He later served as captain of Jersey from 1603 to 1630, a post that was formerly held by Raleigh. His legal disputes with its bailiff Jean Herault established the bailiff's authority over most civil and judicial matters, although Peyton was permitted to continue to style himself as the island's governor.

On 8 June 1578, Peyton married Dorothy Bell (died 1603), the widow of Sir Robert Bell (died 1577), co-heiress of Edward Beaupré of Beaupré Hall, Outwell, Norfolk, and his second wife, Catherine Beddingfield. Peyton gained a position in the county of Norfolk from his wife's property and the responsibilities of raising Bell's eight children, together with his only son, Sir John Peyton (1579–1635).

Government offices
Preceded by Walter Raleigh	Governor of Jersey; 1603–1630	Succeeded by Thomas Jermyn
