= Special interest =

Special interest may refer to:

- Advocacy group
- Special interest group, a community within a larger organization with a shared interest in advancing a specific area of knowledge, learning or technology
- Special interest (autism), a highly focused interest common in autistic people
- Special Interest (band)
- Special-interest terrorism
- Area of special scientific interest
- Special interest high schools in South Australia
