= Timothy Le Cocq =

Bailiff of Jersey

Sir Timothy Le Cocq KC

90th Bailiff of Jersey
- In office 17 October 2019 – 17 October 2025
- Monarchs: Elizabeth II; Charles III
- Governor: Sir John McColl; Sir Stephen Dalton; Sir Jerry Kyd
- Preceded by: William Bailhache
- Succeeded by: Robert MacRae

Personal details
- Born: December 9, 1956 (age 69) Jersey
- Children: 4
- Education: Keele University
- Occupation: Lawyer

Sir Timothy John Le Cocq KC (born 9 December 1956) is a British lawyer and politician who served as the Bailiff of Jersey from 2019 until his retirement in 2025. Prior to his tenure as Bailiff, he was deputy bailiff, attorney general, and solicitor general.

== Early life and education ==
Timothy John Le Cocq was born in Jersey on 9 December 1956. His father, Lieutenant Bernard Le Cocq, was a bank clerk who joined the Royal Navy during World War II and was involved in the Liberation of the German-occupied Channel Islands on 10 May 1945.

Le Cocq was educated at De La Salle College, Jersey and graduated from Keele University with a degree in law and psychology. He was admitted as a barrister to the Inner Temple.

== Career ==
Upon returning to Jersey, Le Cocq worked at a law firm. He was admitted to the bar in England in 1981, and in Jersey in 1985. In 1996, he was appointed as a crown advocate, prosecuting on behalf of the Jersey government. On 8 April 2008, Le Cocq was appointed Her Majesty's solicitor general. He served as Her Majesty's attorney general for Jersey from 10 November 2009 to March 2015.

Le Cocq was sworn in as the Deputy Bailiff of Jersey on 2 April 2015. He became the Bailiff of Jersey on 17 October 2019, and retired on 17 October 2025. He was the president of the Royal Court. Robert MacRae, the Deputy Bailiff, will succeed him.

Collette Anne Crill and Anthony John Olsen were appointed as his lieutenants in 2019. As Bailiff Le Cocq presided over the States Assembly, but had no voting power. Queen Elizabeth II knighted him on 1 June 2022. He attended the coronation of Charles III and Camilla. There was an unsuccessful attempt to separate the Bailiff's position as speaker and chief judge in 2024.

After retiring as Bailiff, Le Cocq became a commissioner of the Royal Court.

== Personal life ==
Le Cocq is the father of four children. He owns a suit of armour, used for medieval reenactment, and collects swords.

Legal offices
Preceded by William Bailhache	Bailiff of Jersey; 2019 – 2025	Succeeded by Robert MacRae
