= Bailiff of Jersey =

Civic head of the Bailiwick of Jersey

- Incumbent; Robert MacRae since 24 October 2025
- Appointer: Monarch of the United Kingdom, at the recommendation of the Jersey Government
- Term length: At His Majesty's Pleasure, at least until retirement (70)
- Formation: At least 1204
- First holder: Philippe L'Evesque (first attested)
- Deputy: Deputy Bailiff of Jersey

The Bailiff of Jersey (French: Le Bailli de Jersey) has several roles:

- Chief judge
- President of the States Assembly, carrying out functions of a presiding officer
- Civic head of the Bailiwick of Jersey
- Guardian of the constitution
- President of the Licensing Assembly, regulating alcohol sales
- Must give permission for certain types of public entertainment to take place.

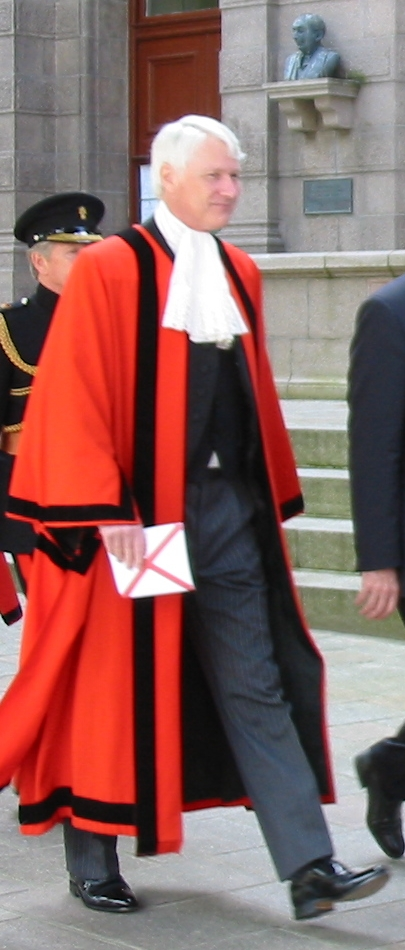
Sir Michael Birt (Bailiff from 2009 to 2015) with sculpture of Lord Coutanche (Bailiff 1935–1962) behind.

The position of Bailiff was created shortly after the Treaty of Paris 1259 in which the king of England, Henry III, gave up claim to all of the Duchy of Normandy but the Channel Islands. In 1290, separate bailiffs for Jersey and Guernsey were appointed.

== History ==
The position of Bailiff in Norman law predates the separation of Normandy in 1204.

=== Origins ===
When the Channel Islands were granted self-governance by King John after 1204, legislative power was vested in 12 jurats, the twelve "senior men" of the island. Along with the Bailiff, they would form the Royal Court, which determined all civil and criminal causes (except treason).

Any oppression by a bailiff or a warden was to be resolved locally or failing that, by appeal to the King who appointed commissioners to report on disputes. In the late 1270s, Jersey was given its own Bailiff (the first record of someone holding the position is in 1277) and from the 1290s, the duties of Bailiff and Warden were separated. The (Sub-)Warden became responsible for taxation and defence, while the Bailiff became responsible for justice. While probably originally a temporary arrangement by Otto de Grandson, this became permanent and the foundation for Jersey's modern separation of Crown and justice. It also lessened the Warden's authority relative to the Bailiff, who had much more interaction with the community.

In 1462, the occupying French Governor de Brézé issued ordinances outlining the role of the Bailiff and the Jurats. It may well be during this occupation that the island saw the establishment of the States. Comte Maulevrier, who had led the invasion of the island, ordered the holding of an Assize in the island. Maulevrier confirmed the place of existing institutions, however created the requirement for Jurats to be chosen by Bailiffs, Jurats, Rectors and Constables. The earliest extant Act of the States dates from 1524.

=== 17th century ===
Sir John Peyton (Governor 1603-1620) was also against democracy in the form of the States and the freedoms of the Courts in Jersey. In 1615, Jean Hérault was appointed Bailiff by the King, having been promised the role by letters patent in 1611. Peyton disputed this appointment, claiming it was the Governor's jurisdiction to appoint the Bailiff. Hérault asserted it was the King's jurisdiction to directly appoint the Bailiff. An Order in Council (dated 9 August 1615) sided with Hérault. Hérault took this to claim the Bailiff was the real head of government and took steps to assert the precedence of the Bailiff over Governor: he ordered his name to be placed before the Governor's in church prayers and was the first Bailiff to wear red robes (in the style of English judges). To back his claims, he cited that in the Norman administrative tradition, the Bailiffs had "no one above them except the Duke". Though the Privy Council did not agree with Hérault's extreme position on the precedence of the Bailiff, on 18 February 1617 it declared that the "charge of military forces be wholly in the Governor, and the care of justice and civil affairs in the Bailiff." This secured for the Bailiff precedence over the Governor on justice and civil affairs.

=== 18th century ===
Following the Jersey Revolution or Corn Riots in 1769, the 1771 Code of Laws confirmed that new Jersey laws could not be adopted without approval by the States assembly and required Privy Council approval. From this time on the Bailiff was to be the chief power in Jersey as president of the States, rather than as president of the Royal Court.

The party of Charlots (conservative supporters of Lemprière who claimed that the States could not pass legislation without the agreement of the Royal Court) were opposed at elections by Magots, and by 1790 the progressive Magots had majorities in both the Royal Court and the States.

By 1750, the Bailiffship had de facto become a hereditary position in the de Carteret family for 166 years. Absences of the de Carterets and all other high-ranking posts left Charles Lempière, the Lieutenant Bailiff, in effective full control over the island. Lempière was a Parliamentarian, but by temperament was autocratic. His family had significant power with a number of high-ranking roles in the island and he issued ordinances and quashed protest through his court.^{:195}

In 1786, the Bailiff gained power to summon the States (in addition to the Governor and Jurats).

=== 19th century ===
In 1826, the long succession of absentee bailiffs came to an end with the appointment of Thomas Le Breton Sr (Bailiff 1826–1831). He was the first Bailiff for 120 years to live in Jersey and was 'accused of indolence'.

Under Jean Hammond (Bailiff 1858–1880) the role became established as a politically impartial, if paternalistic, presidency. The introduction of deputies into the States in 1857 added to the democratic weight of the legislative assembly, but the bailiff still guided the government of the bailiwick.

The States continued to use the Royal Court as their debating chamber until the construction of a dedicated States chamber on an adjacent site in 1887.

In 1899, the Bailiff began receiving an annual salary of £1,200, replacing the previous system of funding through court fees. The cost of this salary was jointly covered by the States and the Crown.

=== 20th century ===
Although the need for centralised administration during the German Occupation 1940-1945 made the Bailiff a commanding figure in the circumstances of trying to maintain the life of the bailiwick, the constitutional reforms of 1948 which removed the Jurats from the States, replacing them with Senators, separated more clearly legislature and judiciary. Political leadership now rested more clearly with the senators as purely political senior elected representatives.The reforms declared that the Bailiff shall be the judge of the law, and the Jurats the "judge of fact".

=== 21st century ===
The States of Jersey Law 2005 removed the Bailiff's casting vote in the event of a tied vote in the States chamber, and the power of dissent. The 2005 law also introduced a ministerial system of government under a Chief Minister, which further removed the Bailiff from involvement in executive decision-making.

== Deputy Bailiff ==
The role of Deputy Bailiff was created by the States Assembly in 1958. This is a full-time professional office. Like the Bailiff, the Deputy Bailiff must be qualified as a Jersey lawyer. The deputy bailiff has a specific function of being the president of the Board of Examiners for the Jersey law examinations.

=== Holders of the office of Deputy Bailiff ===
The office of Deputy Bailiff was established in 1958.

Holder	Term	Notes
Cecil Stanley Harrison	1958–1961	First holder of the office; subsequently appointed Bailiff.
Robert Hugh Le Masurier	1961–1962	Subsequently appointed Bailiff.
Francis de Lisle Bois	1962–1968	Did not become Bailiff.
Herbert Frank Cobbold Ereaut	1969–1974	Subsequently appointed Bailiff.
Peter Leslie Crill	1974–1986	Subsequently appointed Bailiff.
Vernon Amy Tomes	1986–1992	Removed from office by the Crown following extended delays in delivering judgments.
Philip Martin Bailhache	1994–1995	Subsequently appointed Bailiff.
Francis Charles Hamon	1995–2000	Served for five years and did not become Bailiff; subsequently appointed a commissioner of the Jersey Financial Services Commission.
Michael Cameron St John Birt	2000–2009	Subsequently appointed Bailiff.
William James Bailhache	2009–2015	Subsequently appointed Bailiff.
Timothy John Le Cocq	2015–2019	Subsequently appointed Bailiff.
Robert James MacRae	2020–2025	Subsequently appointed Bailiff.
Mark Howard Temple	2026–present	Current Deputy Bailiff.

== Lieutenant Bailiffs ==
Two or more of the senior Jurats are appointed by the Bailiff as Lieutenant Bailiffs. They assist the Bailiff with civic duties and may preside in the Royal Court. Like other Jurats, the Lieutenant Bailiffs are part-time honorary (unpaid) roles.

== Appointment of Bailiff and Deputy Bailiff ==
By convention, the Deputy Bailiff is appointed as Bailiff without a selection process.

The Deputy Bailiff’s appointment is made formally by the Crown, on the recommendation of a panel consisting of the Bailiff, another judge of the Royal Court, and the chair of the Jersey Appointments Commission. The process involves advertisement, shortlisting based on a job description and consultation process, including of some States members who hold particular Assembly roles. In modern times, all Deputy Bailiffs have previously held office as Attorney General or Solicitor General, or both.

The Bailiff is appointed by the Crown through letters patent. They serve at His Majesty's pleasure, usually until an age of retirement as specified in their letters patent, unless they resign earlier. When a Bailiff's term of office ends, all the functions of Bailiff are exercised by the Deputy Bailiff until the next Bailiff is formally appointed.

=== Removal from office ===
The Bailiff and Deputy Bailiff may be removed from office by the King, on the advice of the UK Government minister responsible for Channel Island affairs, currently the Secretary of State for Justice but in the past the Home Secretary. Three individuals who held the office of Bailiff or Deputy Bailiff have been dismissed or required to resign.

- Sir William Venables Vernon resigned as Bailiff in 1931 following a 'round robin' letter from several prominent islanders who believed that, aged 79, he was no longer capable of carrying out his duties.
- Charles Malet de Carteret – 'the most self-effacing man who ever occupied this office'– came under pressure to resign as Bailiff in 1935, after refusing to represent the island at King George V's silver jubilee celebrations in London.
- Vernon Tomes was dismissed from his position as Deputy Bailiff in 1992.

== Roles of the Bailiff ==
=== Chief judge ===
The Bailiff is the Chef Magistrat of the island. 'The major part of the Bailiff's time is spent on his judicial duties', the Carwell Review noted. As chief judge, the Bailiff is

- Head of the judiciary of Jersey
- President of the Royal Court (chief justice)
- President of the Court of Appeal, though in practice the Bailiff rarely sits in this court
- Member of the Court of Appeal of Guernsey

In the Royal Court, the Bailiff may sit as a single judge or with Jurats. The Bailiff is the judge of law but not generally a judge of fact. Instead, the Jurats normally decide the facts in civil and the sentence in criminal cases.

The Bailiff appoints Commissioners to preside in the Royal Court.

The Bailiff appoints - but alone cannot suspend or dismiss - the Judicial Greffier (the clerk of the court). The Bailiff can also issue search warrants.

=== President of the States Assembly ===
The Bailiff serves as the president (or speaker) of the States Assembly. This role has been in place from the origins of the States in the 16th century, and stems from the States' role as a consultative body for the Royal Court, where the Bailiff also presided. Le Hérissier notes that ‘From 1771 to 1940, the States slowly detached themselves from the influence of the Royal Court’, growing more representative with the inclusion of elected members – but the Bailiff remained.

Historically, the Bailiff had authority to 'dissent' from a resolution passed by the States Assembly if the Bailiff was of the opinion that the Assembly lacked the power to pass it. This had the effect of transmitting the resolution to the King and making the resolution of no effect. This was abolished by the States of Jersey Law 2005.

The Bailiff, or Deputy Bailiff when presiding, also previously held a casting vote in the event that the States Assembly was equally divided. This vote, rarely exercised, was by convention used maintain the status quo, allowing further debate on the issue. This was also abolished in 2005.

In the Chamber, the Bailiff's seat is 18 cm (7.1 in) higher than the Lieutenant Governor's to emphasise the Bailiff's higher position in regard to the island's civil government.

The question whether the office of bailiff should combine roles of chief justice, presiding officer of the legislature and civic functions has long been a matter of debate. The 1947 Report of the Committee of the Privy Council on the Proposed Reforms in the Channel Islands recommended 'that there should be no alteration in the present functions of the Bailiff'. But three official reviews in the 21st century have recommended that the Bailiff should cease to have the role of President of the States Assembly:

- The Clothier review on the machinery of government in Jersey (December 2000).
- The Carswell review of the Crown Officers (December 2009).
- The Independent Jersey Care Inquiry (July 2017).

The case for reform is that in a democracy, parliamentarians should have the power to choose the speaker of their assembly. There have also been concerns that the Bailiff's position as President of the States Assembly conflicts with the constitutional principles of separation of powers and judicial independence. Such calls for the separation of the office's powers are longstanding: in 1859, writer Helier Simon called a potential separation "desirable".

The Bailiff's role as President of the States Assembly is defended on the grounds that the current arrangement works well in practice. There are also concerns that removing the Bailiff from the States Assembly would undermine his status as the civic head of Jersey.

=== Civic head ===
The Carswell Review noted that the Bailiff 'carries out a number of ceremonial and public duties. He receives Royalty, visiting ambassadors and other prominent visitors to Jersey, plays the leading part in the Liberation Day and Remembrance Sunday ceremonies and hosts a number of official dinners. When the Lieutenant Governor is away from the Island the Bailiff acts as Deputy Governor. He is a member of various public committees, supports and attends functions of a number of charities and community organisations and has a constant round of public engagements to fulfil'.

The Bailiff was previously President of the Emergencies Council, which was established in 1990, but is no longer a member though remains entitled to attend.

=== Guardian of the constitution ===
In 2020, the Deputy Bailiff described the Bailiff's guardian of the constitution function as including powers of

- 'giving voice to constitutional concerns that might undermine the rights and privileges of the Island and of Islanders, and advising and warning the Chief Minister and Government of Jersey accordingly' and
- 'advising the Lieutenant Governor who in turn advises the Sovereign on constitutional matters affecting the Island’s privileges and freedoms'.

The Bailiff is the official channel of communication between the island authorities and the UK Government, though this has altered since the development of ministerial government and the creation of the role of Chief Minister.

The Bailiff is also the keeper of the island's Royal Mace the custodian of the island's seal, first granted by Edward I in 1279.

=== President of the Licensing Assembly ===
The Bailiff presides over the Licensing Assembly, the remains of a body which once exercised considerable administrative authority, but now only has the powers to grant alcohol licences. Lord Carswell's review in 2009 recommended that the Bailiff should remain the president of Licensing Assembly. The Licensing Assembly will be replaced with a new regulatory regime when the Alcohol Licensing (Jersey) Law 2026 is brought into force.

=== Licensor of public entertainment ===
Many types of public entertainment can only take place by permission of the Bailiff. This is done in consultation with public services and standards of public decency. Since 1987, an advisory panel appointed by the States Assembly has delegated authority in the name of the bailiff who is not involved in any respect with the decision-making process.

The Carswell review noted that 'It is recognised generally that this is an executive function which it is not appropriate for the Bailiff to carry out, and successive Bailiff have wished to be relieved of it'.

The last Bailiff to make extensive use of censorship powers, on advice of a consultative committee, was Sir Peter Crill. In 1992, he refused permission for a visiting amateur theatre group to perform Howard Brenton's play Christie in Love and required changes to the staging of a production of Shakespeare's Coriolanus by the Tricycle Theatre Company to prevent an actor's naked buttocks being visible to the audience. The Monty Python film 'Life of Brian' was deemed suitable only for islanders over 18, which led to the production company refusing to let it be shown in Jersey.

== Holders of the office of Bailiff ==
The list of bailiffs is only reliably traceable from Philippe L'Evesque's appointment in 1277, although earlier bailiffs are mentioned and the office may date from before 1204.

=== 14th century ===
- Jean de Carteret 1302
- Philippe Levesque 1309
- Colin ? Hasteyn 1315
- Henry de St. Martin 1318
- Guillaume Longynnour c. 1324
- Herny de St.Martin c. 1324
- Pierre Ugoun (Ygon) c. 1324
- Lucas de Espyard c. 1324
- Pierre de la Haye c. 1324
- Philippe de Vyncheleys c. 1324
- Nicolas (or Colin) Hasteyn c. 1332
- Philippe de Vincheleis c. 1332
- Matthieu Le Loreour c. 1332
- Pierre de la Haye c. 1332
- Guillaume Brasdefer c. 1332
- Guille Hastein (or Hastings) 1348
- Roger de Powderham 1351
- Guille Hastein (or Hastings) 1352
- John Cockerels 1356
- Raoul Lempriere 1362–1364
- Richard de St. Martin 1367–1368
- Richard le Petit 1368–1369
- Richard de St. Martin 1370
- Richard le Petit 1371
- Richard de St. Martin 1372–1374
- Thomas Brasdefer 1378–1391
- Giefrey Brasdefer 1396–1401

=== 15th century ===
- Colin le Petit 1402–1403
- Guillaume de Layc 1405–1406
- Thomas Danyel 1406–1425
- Jean Bernard 1432, 1436–1444
- Jean Lempriere 1434–1438
- Thomas de la Cour 1435
- Jean Payn 1444, 1446
- Regnauld de Carteret 1446–1451
- Jean Poingdestre 1452–1453
- Nicolas Morin 1459–1468
- Jean Poingdestre 1468–1477
- Guillaume Hareby 1479–1481, 1484–1485
- Clement Le Hardy 1486–1493
- Jean Nicolle 1494
- Thomas Lempriere 1495–1513, 1415?

=== 16th century ===
- Helier de Carteret 1513–1515
- Helier de Carteret 1516–1523
- Helier de Carteret 1529–1560
- Hostes Nicolle 1561–1564
- John Dumaresq 1566–1583
- George Paulett 1583–1586
- John Dumaresq 1586–1587
- George Paulett 1587–1591
- John Dumaresq 1591–1594
- George Paulett 1594–1614

=== 17th century ===
- Jean Herault 1614–1621
- William Parkhurst 1622–1624
- Jean Herault 1624–1626
- Philippe de Carteret 1627–1643
- Michel Lemprière 1643
- Sir George de Carteret, 1st Bt., 1643–1651
- Michel Lemprière 1651–1660
- Sir George de Carteret, 1st Bt., 1660–1661
- Sir Philippe de Carteret, 1st Bt., 1661–1662
- Philippe de Carteret 1662–1665
- Edouard de Carteret 1665–1682
- Sir Philippe de Carteret, 2nd Bt., 1682–1693
- Edouard de Carteret 1694–1703

=== 18th century ===
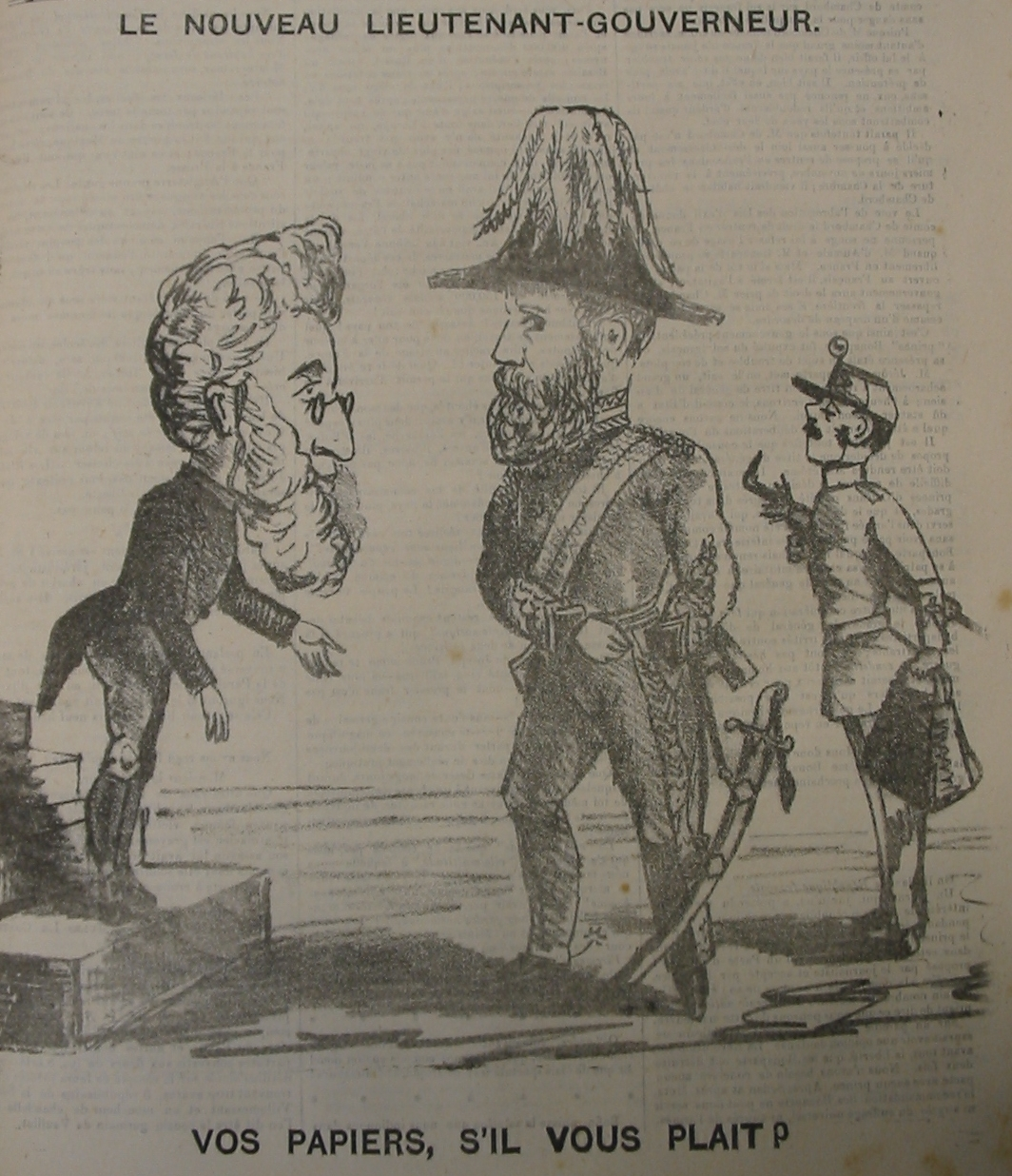
In this caricature of 1873, Bailiff of Jersey Jean Hammond (left) greets the newly arrived Lieutenant Governor with the question: "Your papers, please?"

- Sir Charles de Carteret, 3rd Bt., 1703–1715
- John Carteret, 2nd Earl Granville 1715–1763
- Robert Carteret, 3rd Earl Granville 1763–1776
- Henry Frederick, Lord Carteret 1776–1826

=== 19th century ===
- Thomas Le Breton 1826–1831
- Jean de Veulle 1831–1848
- Thomas Le Breton 1848–1857
- Jean Hammond 1858–1880
- Sir Robert Pipon Marett 1880–1884
- George Clement Bertram 1884–1898
- Edouard Charles Malet de Carteret 1898
- William Venables Vernon 1899–1931

=== 20th century ===
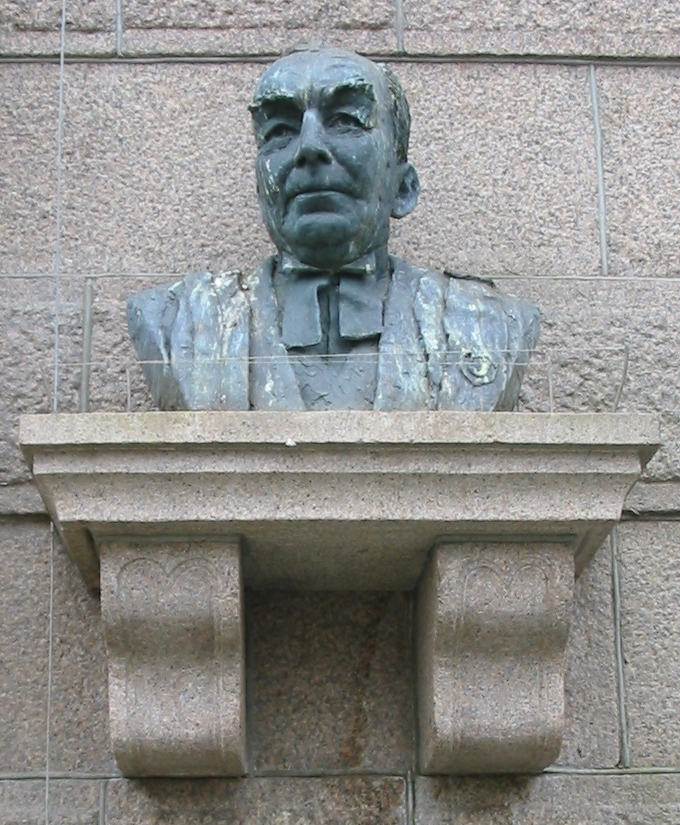
Lord Coutanche, Bailiff 1935–1962

- Charles Malet de Carteret 1931–1935
- Sir Alexander Coutanche (created Lord Coutanche in 1961) 1935–1962
- Cecil Stanley Harrison 1961–1962
- Sir Robert Le Masurier 1962–1975
- Sir Frank Ereaut 1975–1985
- Sir Peter Crill 1986–1994
- Sir Philip Bailhache 2 February 1995–2009

=== 21st century ===
- Sir Michael Birt 9 July 2009–2015
- Sir William Bailhache 29 January 2015–2019
- Sir Timothy Le Cocq 17 October 2019–17 October 2025
- Robert MacRae 24 October 2025

== See also ==
- Bailiff (Channel Islands)
- Lieutenant Governor of Jersey
- List of bailiffs of Guernsey
- Seigneur of Sark
