= Jerry Kyd =

Royal Navy Vice-Admiral (born 1967)

His Excellency Vice Admiral Sir Jerry Kyd KBE
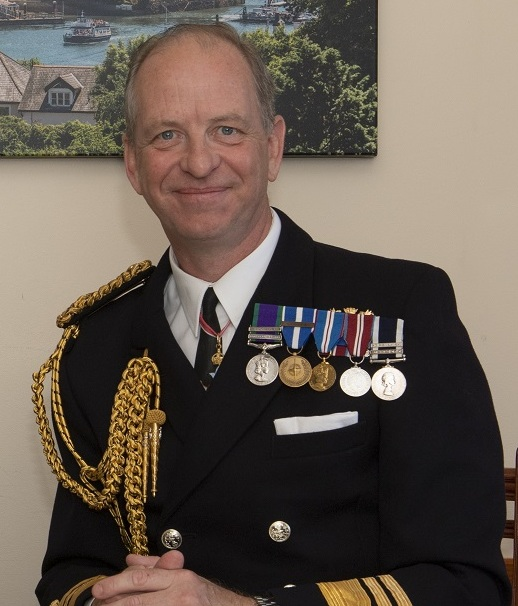
- Vice-Admiral Kyd in 2021

Lieutenant Governor of Jersey
- Incumbent
- Assumed office 8 October 2022
- Monarch: Charles III
- Chief Minister: Kristina Moore; Lyndon Farnham
- Preceded by: Sir Stephen Dalton

Personal details
- Born: August 1967 (age 59)
- Education: University of Southampton

Military service
- Allegiance: United Kingdom
- Branch/service: Royal Navy
- Years of service: 1990–2022
- Rank: Vice-Admiral
- Commands: Fleet Commander; United Kingdom Maritime Forces; HMS Queen Elizabeth; United Kingdom Carrier Strike Group; Response Force Task Group; Britannia Royal Naval College; HMS Illustrious; HMS Ark Royal; HMS Monmouth
- Awards: Knight Commander of the Order of the British Empire

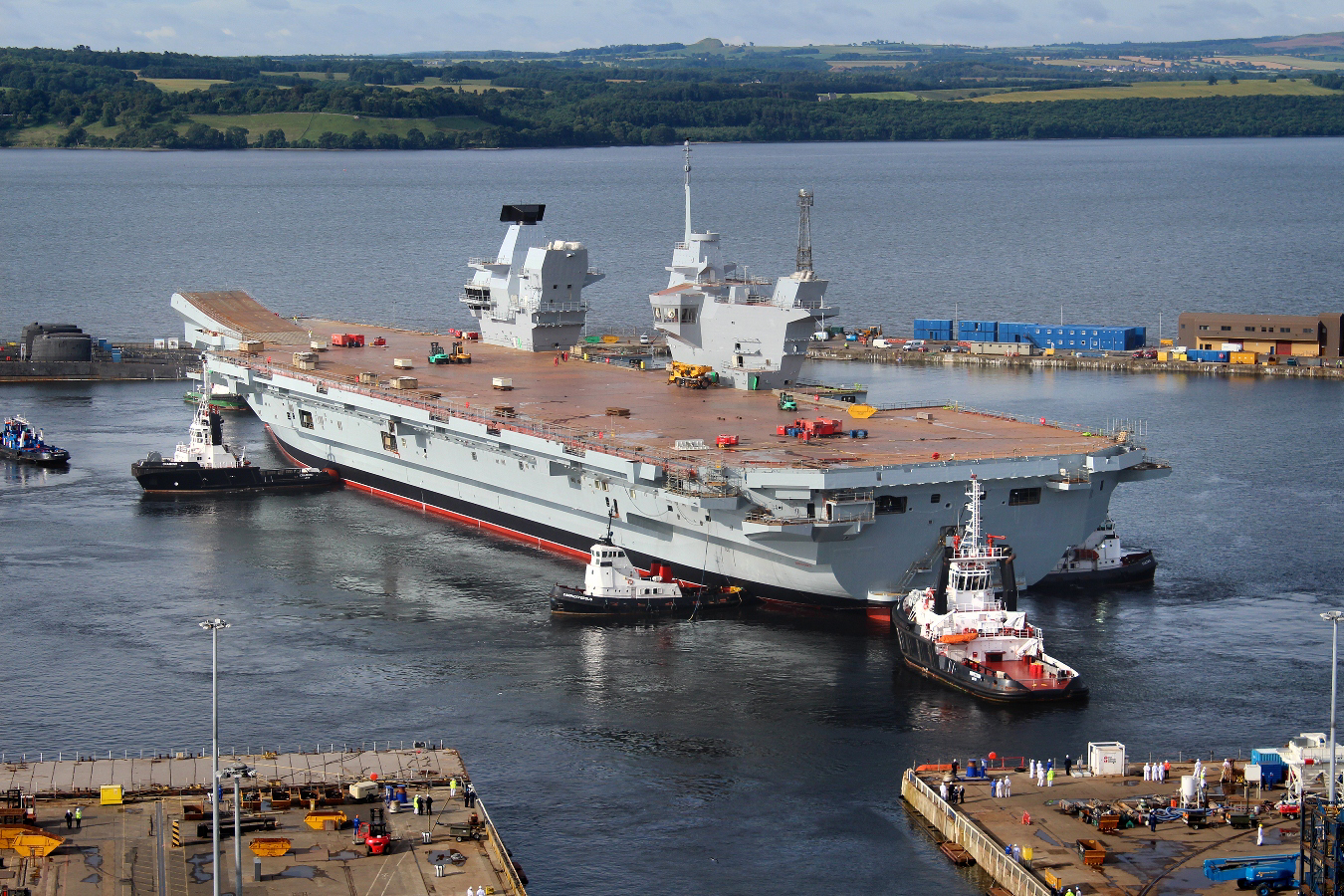
HMS Queen Elizabeth being launched in July 2014

Vice Admiral Sir Jeremy Paul Kyd, KBE (born August 1967) is a former senior officer in the Royal Navy. He has served as the Lieutenant Governor of Jersey since October 2022. He formerly served as Fleet Commander from March 2019 to September 2021.

== Early life and education ==
Kyd was born in August 1967. He was educated at King's School, Macclesfield, and the University of Southampton.

== Naval career ==
Kyd was commissioned into the Royal Navy on 20 October 1990. He was given command of the frigate HMS Monmouth in 2004. Promoted to captain on 2 November 2009, he became the last commanding officer of HMS Ark Royal in September 2010, commanding officer of HMS Illustrious in 2011 and commanding officer of the Britannia Royal Naval College in Dartmouth in September 2012.

In February 2014, Kyd was named as the first future seagoing captain of the British aircraft carrier HMS Queen Elizabeth as well as Commander United Kingdom Task Group. Kyd became commanding officer of HMS Queen Elizabeth in May 2016, replacing Captain Simon Petitt, the Senior Naval Officer of Queen Elizabeth who had effectively been CO of the ship since 2012. Kyd routinely wore the Royal Navy rank of captain while retaining the substantive rank of commodore, following historical custom. He became Commander United Kingdom Carrier Strike Group in February 2015.

Kyd was appointed as Commander United Kingdom Maritime Forces and Rear Admiral Surface Ships in October 2018 and promoted to rear admiral on 19 November. In March 2019, he was promoted to the substantive rank of vice admiral and took up the appointment of Fleet Commander. He was appointed a Commander of the Order of the British Empire (CBE) in the 2019 Birthday Honours. He retired on 11 March 2022.

== Lieutenant-Governor of Jersey ==
Kyd became Lieutenant-Governor of Jersey on 8 October 2022 replacing Air Marshal Sir Stephen Dalton, who retired in June 2022.

Kyd was advanced to Knight Commander of the Order of the British Empire in the 2025 Birthday Honours.

== Personal life ==
Kyd is a Younger Brother of Trinity House and a member of the Royal Yacht Squadron. He is married and has four sons. He was Vice President of Ice Sports for the Naval Service, and President of the Royal Navy & Royal Marines Boxing Association during his time in the Royal Navy.

Military offices
Preceded by Simon Petitt	Captain of HMS Queen Elizabeth; May 2016 – October 2018	Succeeded by Nick Cooke-Priest
Preceded by Paul Bennett	Commander United Kingdom Maritime Forces; 2018–2019	Succeeded by Andrew Burns
Preceded by Ben Key	Fleet Commander; 2019–2021	Succeeded by Andrew Burns
Government offices
Preceded by Sir Stephen Dalton	Lieutenant Governor of Jersey; 2022–present	Incumbent
