= External relations of Jersey =

The external relations of the Bailiwick of Jersey are conducted by the External Relations department of the Government of Jersey. Jersey is not an independent state; it is a British Crown dependency, so internationally the United Kingdom is responsible for protecting the island and for consulting Jersey on international trade agreements but it is not a British territory.

Jersey is a self-governing parliamentary democracy under a constitutional monarchy, with its own financial, legal and judicial systems, and the power of self-determination, which has relations with other countries, territories and international organisations.

Diplomatic representation is officially reserved to the Crown and relations are conducted by Her Majesty's Government on behalf of the island (however only with its prior consultation). Jersey, with exceptions, cannot sign up to international agreements under its own authority. Despite this, Jersey has its distinct international identity and its interests may differ from those of the UK.

Jersey informally negotiates directly with foreign governments on various matters. Jersey maintains the Bureau de Jersey in Caen, France, a permanent non-diplomatic representation, with a branch office in Rennes. A similar office, the Maison de la Normandie in St. Helier, represents the Conseil général of Manche and the Regional Council of Normandy. It also houses the Consulate of France.

In July 2009, a Channel Islands Tunnel was proposed to connect Jersey with Lower Normandy.

Jersey is a member of the British-Irish Council, the Commonwealth Parliamentary Association and the Assemblée parlementaire de la Francophonie. Jersey wants to become a full member of the Commonwealth in its own right.

== Constitutional situation ==
In 2007, the Chief Minister and the UK Lord Chancellor signed an agreement that established a framework for the development of the international identity of Jersey. The agreement stated that:

- the UK has no democratic accountability in and for Jersey;
- the UK will not act internationally on behalf of Jersey without prior consultation;
- Jersey has an international identity that is different from that of the UK;
- the UK recognises that the interests of Jersey may differ from those of the UK, and the UK will seek to represent any differing interests when acting in an international capacity; and
- the UK and Jersey will work together to resolve or clarify any differences that may arise between their respective interests.

The preamble to the States of Jersey Law 2005 declares that 'it is recognized that Jersey has autonomous capacity in domestic affairs' and 'it is further recognized that there is an increasing need for Jersey to participate in matters of international affairs'.

In January 2011, the Chief Minister designated one of his assistant ministers as having responsibility for external relations; he is now often described as the island's 'foreign minister'. There has since been officially established a Minister for External Relations, a post held by Senator Ian Gorst.

== Relations with the United Kingdom ==
The relationship between the Crown dependencies and the UK is "one of mutual respect and support, ie, a partnership".

Until 2001, responsibility for the UK government's relationships with the Crown dependencies rested with the Home Office, but it was then transferred first to the Lord Chancellor's Department, then to the Department for Constitutional Affairs, and finally to the Ministry of Justice. In 2010 the Ministry of Justice stated that relationships with the Crown dependencies are the responsibility of the United Kingdom Government as a whole, with the Ministry of Justice holding responsibility for the constitutional relationship and other ministries engaging with their opposite numbers in the Crown dependencies according to their respective policy areas.

Since 2011 the government of Jersey has sent representatives to the main party conferences of the United Kingdom, its "most significant economic partner", as part of a commitment to enhancing political engagement with the UK. In 2012 the Assistant Chief Minister attended the conference of the UK Liberal Democrats, the Chief Minister attended the UK Labour Party conference, and the Deputy Chief Minister and Treasury and Resources Minister were announced to attend the UK Conservative Party conference. Guernsey's Deputy Chief Minister and Jersey's Assistant Chief Minister travelled to Dublin in September 2012 as a first step in a more coordinated approach to international relations. The purpose of the visit was to meet Ireland's Minister for European Affairs for mutual discussions ahead of Ireland's assumption of the European Union presidency in 2013.

Jersey's economic relationship with the UK is part of the framework of the United Kingdom–Crown Dependencies Customs Union, of which Jersey is a part. There is a common external tariff, and the UK negotiates free trade agreements for Jersey on behalf of its government.

=== Separation debate ===
The question of an independent Jersey has been discussed from time to time in the Assembly of the States of Jersey. In 2005–2008, a working group of the States of Jersey examined the options for independence, concluding that Jersey "is equipped to face the challenges of independence" but making no recommendations. Proposals for Jersey independence have been discussed outside the States.

In July 2005, the Policy and Resources Committee of the States of Jersey established the Constitutional Review Group, chaired by Sir Philip Bailhache, with terms of reference "to conduct a review and evaluation of the potential advantages and disadvantages for Jersey in seeking independence from the United Kingdom or other incremental change in the constitutional relationship, while retaining the Queen as Head of State". The Group's Second Interim Report was presented to the States by the Council of Ministers in June 2008.

In June 2012, Sir Philip Bailhache said the island should be ready to become independent after a number of regulatory clampdowns and political attacks on the Channel Islands' "controversial" financial industry. He called the island's relationship with the UK "a raw deal" and "not fair" and that is "very plain" that Jersey's interests were not always aligned with the UK's. Lord McNally, the Minister responsible for the Channel Islands at the time said it would be "ill-advised" of the islands to seek independence. A Guardian editorial at the time stated the islands would be unable to successfully achieve independence and maintain their finance industry, citing the fact that when the Bahamas declared independence from the UK in 1973, its finance industry largely moved to the Cayman Islands. Jersey's economy is highly reliant on finance: in June 2020, it was reported that there were 13,450 jobs within this sector.

In October 2012, the Council of Ministers issued a "Common Policy for External Relations" that noted "that it is not Government policy to seek independence from the United Kingdom, but rather to ensure that Jersey is prepared if it were in the best interests of Islanders to do so". On the basis of the established principles the Council of Ministers decided to "ensure that Jersey is prepared for external change that may affect the Island's formal relationship with the United Kingdom and/or European Union".

In June 2018, during the UK's Brexit negotiations, former External Relations Minister Sir Philip Bailhache said Jersey was not faced by the decision of independence right now and "We are a long way from that at the present time", but that depending on the outcome of Brexit for Jersey, Independence from the UK 'may be the only option' left to the island. He states the "Island should be prepared to go it alone and to become an independent state."

In November 2019, the Government stated that although it had contingency plans in the event of separation, "it is not Government policy to seek independence from the United Kingdom".

== Relations with other British Isles ==
Jersey has a very close relationship with the other Channel Islands, with several shared institutions, as well as a common geography, heritage, culture and constitutional relationship. There have often been calls for a confederation of the Channel Islands, including a conference in 2012 on the matter. Senator Gorst, the External Relations minister said in 2019, ‘A confederation would make the islands stronger when working together on issues that affect us all ... This would be a combined Channel Island committee with elected members from each parliament, and those parliaments would decide which issues to send up to that committee.'

In 1998 Guernsey and Jersey electricity companies formed the Channel Islands Electricity Grid to operate and manage the submarine cables between Europe and the Channel Islands. A fishing dispute relating to fishing within the Guernsey 12 mile limit surfaced again in 2015.

During the 2020 COVID-19 Pandemic, over differences in the way the islands responded to the pandemic, Guernsey Deputy Peter Ferbrache called Jersey's government 'a bunch of bumbling idiots' and said that his island was a 'much, much, much better run bailiwick' and Jersey businesses might regret setting up the island. He was later that year elected as Guernsey's Chief Minister.

In September 2010 a Channel Islands Brussels Office was set up jointly by both Jersey and Guernsey to develop the Channel Islands' influence with the EU, to advise the Channel Islands' governments on European matters, and to promote economic links with the EU.

A Guernsey-Jersey double taxation agreement was first signed in 1956. On 24 January 2013 Jersey signed double taxation agreements with Guernsey and with the Isle of Man. This was the first time all three Crown dependencies had established such mutual agreements which also included provision for exchange of tax information equivalent to TIEAs.

=== Trilateral Crown dependency ===
The three crown dependencies, while independent, share a relatively similar position with respect to the United Kingdom and with international bodies such as the EU or the OECD. As a result, the crown dependencies work together on areas of mutual interest. For example, in 2000, the three states cooperated on development of common policies for offshore banking. In 2003, they developed a joint approach to certain EU activities around tax information. The heads of government of the crown dependencies, including Isle of Man, Guernsey, Alderney, Sark, and Jersey, meet at an annual inter-island summit, to discuss matters of common concern, such as financial regulation and relations with the UK.

=== British–Irish Council ===
Jersey has formed part of the British–Irish Council since it was formed in 1999, as does the Isle of Man. Meetings take place twice a year, in 2002, 2009 and 2013 the meetings have taken place in Jersey. Its stated aim is to "promote the harmonious and mutually beneficial development of the totality of relationships among the peoples of these islands".

Jersey is leading the Creative Industries discussions.

== International relations ==
=== Tax ===
Tax information exchange agreements (TIEAs) have been signed directly by the island with several countries, including: the United States of America (2002); the Netherlands (2007); Denmark, the Faroes, Finland, Greenland, Iceland, Sweden and Norway (2008); the United Kingdom, France, Australia and New Zealand (2009); Portugal (2010); People's Republic of China, Turkey, Mexico, Canada, Indonesia, Czech Republic, South Africa, Argentina, and India (2011); Brazil and Latvia (2013).

Jersey has come under scrutiny for being a 'tax haven'. In 2019, it was placed on a 21-country 'tax haven blacklist' by the Netherlands. However the island has not been blacklisted by the EU on its list of non-cooperative tax jurisdictions.

=== Human rights treaties ===
Jersey does not suffer any of the major human rights crisis that have occurred globally. Jersey cannot sign international treaties in its own right. It instead must have the UK's ratification of treaties extended to it. Regarding human rights treaties, Jersey is party to several core UN treaties:

- International Convention on the Elimination of All Forms of Racial Discrimination (1965)
- International Covenant on Civil and Political Rights (1966)
- International Covenant on Economic, Social and Cultural Rights (1966)
- Convention against Torture and Other Cruel, Inhuman or Degrading Treatment or Punishment (1984)
- Convention on the Rights of the Child (1989)

It notably does not have the Convention on the Elimination of All Forms of Discrimination against Women (1979) extended to it.

=== Commonwealth ===
Jersey is not a member of the Commonwealth of Nations in its own right, but through its association with the United Kingdom. It participates in various Commonwealth institutions in its own right: for example, the Commonwealth Parliamentary Association and the Commonwealth Games.

Jersey regards the existing situation as unsatisfactory and has lobbied for change. The States of Jersey have called on the UK Foreign Secretary to request that the Commonwealth Heads of Government "consider granting associate membership to Jersey and the other Crown Dependencies as well as any other territories at a similarly advanced stage of autonomy". Jersey has proposed that it be accorded "self-representation in all Commonwealth meetings; full participation in debates and procedures, with a right to speak where relevant and the opportunity to enter into discussions with those who are full members; and no right to vote in the Ministerial or Heads of Government meetings, which is reserved for full members".

=== European Union ===
Jersey is a third-party European country to the EU. Its relationship with the EU operates under the free-trade agreement negotiated by the UK. On 27 December 2020, Jersey agreed to be part of the UK-EU Trade and Economic Cooperation Agreement from 1 January 2021. Goods exported from the island into Europe are not subject to tariffs and Jersey is solely responsible for management of its territorial waters. Although there is no provision for services, the External Relations Minister Ian Gorst is confident it is compatible with pre-existing relationship. The deal was unanimously approved by the States Assembly.

Jersey and Guernsey jointly opened an office in Brussels in 2010 to promote their common interests with European Union institutions. Jersey is particularly concerned about European Union legislation and reforms that may affect its trading partners in international financial centres round the world.

Jersey maintains the Bureau des Iles Anglo-Normandes in Caen, France, a permanent non-diplomatic representation. A similar office, the Maison de Normandie in St. Helier, represented the Conseil général of Manche and the Regional Council of Normandy. It was set up in 1995, but withdrawn in 2021 over a fishing dispute. It also houses the Consulate of France. In July 2009, a Channel Islands Tunnel was proposed to connect Jersey with Lower Normandy.

Under the Trade and Cooperation Agreement, regarding fishing, Jersey takes control of all fishing boats in its waters through a licensing process, however EU boats with a history of fishing in Jersey waters will be granted a permit. Similarly, Jersey boats that have traditionally fished in French waters will be given a permit to continue by the French authorities. The implementation of this new deal has led to a dispute between the French and British governments.

==== Historical relationship ====
Jersey and the other Channel Islands, have never been part of the EU, nor associate members. When the UK acceded to the EU in 1973, Jersey became a Community Territory (and later a member state territory). Jersey was part of the EU customs union and had free movement of goods and trade between the island and the EU. Jersey did not appear on the list of European States and Territories outside the Union and the Communities prepared by the European Council and the Commission.

However, that is not to say that it was outside the European Communities or the European Union in the sense that it is excluded. The relationship between Jersey and the European Communities was negotiated as a modified extension of the existing relationship with the United Kingdom by Sir Geoffrey Rippon, as he was then. The only European Territories under United Kingdom responsibility which were excluded were the Sovereign Base Areas in Cyprus.

Had the Special relationship not been negotiated, then Jersey would have been included within the Communities in the same way as Gibraltar. The Island's relationship with the EC and the EU was governed by article 26(3) of the Act of Accession, amending article 227 of the then EEC Treaty, later Article 355(5)(c) TFEU. That article acted together with Protocol 3 to the UK's Treaty of Accession in 1972 which was incorporated into the Treaties, by article 158 of the Act of Accession. On Cyprus' Accession, the exclusion of the Cyprus Base Territories was reversed, and the resulting article 355(5)(b) no longer contains the term excluded. For Jersey to be outside the EU and the EC, the term excluded would have had to have been employed.

The Treaties therefore applied, but only to the extent necessary to give effect to the arrangements in the Protocol. Protocol 3 and other relevant treaty provisions were made part of Jersey Law by the European Communities (Jersey) Law 1973. Hence the inclusion of provisions of Community law and judgements of the CJEU within the laws of the Island through those provisions, in a similar manner as in the United Kingdom. The relationship between the Channel Islands and the EU was not able to be changed without the unanimous agreement of all Member States and Island authorities.

Under Protocol 3, Jersey was part of the European Union Customs Union of the European Community. The common customs tariff, levies and other agricultural import measures applied to trade between the island and non-Member States. There was free movement of goods and trade between the island and Member States. EU rules on freedom of movement for workers did not apply in Jersey. However, for the time that the UK was an EU member, Jersey is required to apply the same rules to EU nationals as it does to UK nationals, who can move to Jersey by virtue of the Common Travel Area. Nor was Jersey part of the single market in financial services. It was not required to implement EU Directives on such matters as movement of capital, company law or money laundering. Hence the working parallel with the prior constitutional relationship with the United Kingdom. Note however the CJEU in Pereira held that article 4 of the Third Protocol required the Island's authorities to give same treatment to all legal and natural persons of the Communities applied in any area where the Treaties would be applicable in a territory in which they were fully applicable. That implies that the Treaties in those areas are applicable in principle, but through the article 4 threshold.

The Commission's position on the relationship was stated clearly in a reply by Commissioner Prodi in 2003 to a European Parliamentary question. He confirmed that Jersey was within the European Union to the extent that the United Kingdom was responsible for its external relationships, and evoked the Treaties and the arrangements within the Protocol. The European Council mandated the Commission in 2013 to initiate negotiations with European States and Territories outside the Communities on their implementation of the amendments to the EC Savings Directive. Jersey was not on that list, as it was not outside the Communities or the Union, but had a special relationship within these.

The island was therefore within the scope of the Treaties to a limited extent, as a European Territory. To infer, as the French Ambassador and finance minister had attempted to argue, namely that the island is outside the European Union and Communities without qualification is therefore simplistic, in law false. The German blacklisting of the island had to be hastily revoked when this was pointed out. As a result, Jersey was not part of the single market in financial services. It was not required to implement EU Directives on such matters as the movement of capital, company law or money laundering. However, the island's close proximity (135 km south) and its close association with the financial sector of the U.K. has come under increasing scrutiny in recent years, with several mainline publications (e.g., The Wall Street Journal) labelling the island a tax haven.

British citizens who only had a bloodline connection to Jersey, and not with the United Kingdom or another Member state of the European Union, were not considered to be European Union citizens within the sphere of the freedom of movement of persons. They had 'Islander status' and their Jersey-issued British passports were endorsed with the words the holder is not entitled to benefit from EU provisions relating to employment or establishment. This status no longer exists. Jersey residents never had a right to vote in elections for the European Parliament.

However, it was never clear whether the citizenship rights in articles 18 and 21 TFEU are partly available to them as British Citizens, given the limited restriction of their rights under article 2 of the Protocol. That restriction on the exercise of certain freedoms did not apply to all Community or Union rights. The freedom of movement under the prior EC régime is a separate set of rights from the Citizen rights under article 20 and 21 TFEU which include the right to move and reside. Those rights are primary citizenship rights, not a mere freedom. It may not have needed a Treaty change to perfect this, merely a preliminary ruling from the CJEU, and supplementary implementation measures from the council, given the effective right of entrance and residence granted to EU nationals via Article 4 of the Protocol.

== See also ==
- United Kingdom–Crown Dependencies Customs Union
