= Jersey =

Crown Dependency in the English Channel

Jersey Jèrri (Jèrriais)
- British Crown Dependency
- Bailiwick of Jersey
- Flag Coat of arms
- Anthem: "Beautiful Jersey"
- British national anthem: "God Save the King" (Note: "God Save the King" is the national anthem by custom, not statute, and there is no authorised version. Typically only the first verse is usually sung, although the second verse is also often sung as well at state and public events. The words King, he, him, his, used at present, are replaced by Queen, she, her when the monarch is female.)
- Location of Jersey (green) in Europe (dark grey)

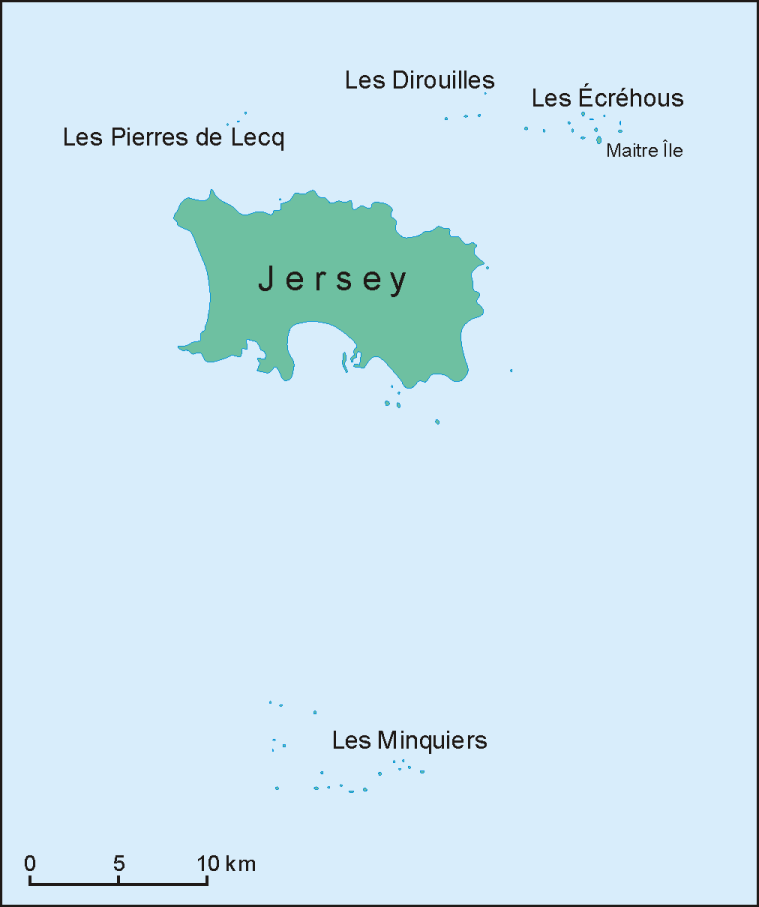
- Map of islands of Bailiwick of Jersey
- Sovereign state responsible for Jersey: United Kingdom
- Separation from the Duchy of Normandy: 1290
- Capital and largest parish (Note: The largest settlement in Jersey is in fact made up of parts of various parishes and is often referred to as "town" by islanders.): St Helier (Note: St Helier is the de facto capital of Jersey, being the seat of the island's government. Government House, the official royal residence of the island, is located in Saint Saviour.); 49°11.4′N 2°6.6′W
- Official languages: English; Jèrriais; Jersey Legal French; (Note: Jersey does not have a de jure official language, but these are the permitted languages in the island's parliament, the States Assembly. The working and most widely spoken language is English, though French retains a historical and ceremonial working role.)
- Ethnic groups (2021): 95.8% White; 44.4% Jersey; 30.5% British; 9.4% Portuguese; 3.0% Polish; 2.1% Irish; 1.4% Romanians; 5% other European; 1.9% Asian; 0.9% African; 1.3% Multiracial
- Religion (2015): 52.3% Christianity; 23% Anglican (official) (Note: The Church of England is the established church of Jersey.); 22.5% Catholicism; 6.8% other Christian; 39% no religion; 3% other religion
- Demonym(s): Islanders, Jerseyman, Jerseywoman, Jersey bean, Jersey crapaud, Jèrriais(e)
- Government: Parliamentary constitutional monarchy
  - Sovereign: Charles III
  - Lieutenant Governor: Sir Jerry Kyd
  - Bailiff: Robert MacRae
  - Chief Minister: Lyndon Farnham
- Legislature: States Assembly

Government of the United Kingdom
  - Minister: Baron Lemos

Area
  - Total: 119.6 km^{2} (46.2 sq mi) (unranked)
  - Water (%): 0
- Highest elevation: 143 m (469 ft)

Population
  - 2025 estimate: 104,490
  - 2021 census: 103,267
  - Density: 859/km^{2} (2,224.8/sq mi)
- GDP (PPP): 2015 estimate
  - Total: £4.57 billion
  - Per capita: £45,783
- GDP (nominal): 2024 estimate
  - Total: £6.859 billion (US$8.76 billion)
  - Per capita: £65,800 (US$84,036)
- Gini (2014): 0.3 low
- HDI (2011): 0.985 very high
- Currency: Pound sterling; Jersey pound (£); (GBP)
- Time zone: UTC±00:00 (GMT)
  - Summer (DST): UTC+01:00 (BST)
- Date format: dd/mm/yyyy
- Mains electricity: 230 V–50 Hz
- Driving side: Left
- Calling code: +44
- UK postcode: JE1 – JE5
- ISO 3166 code: JE
- Internet TLD: .je

Jersey (/ˈdʒɜːrzi/ JUR-zee; Jèrriais: Jèrri [ʒɛri]), officially the Bailiwick of Jersey, (Note: French: Bailiage de Jersey; Jèrriais: Bailiage d'Jèrri) is an autonomous and self-governing British Crown Dependency in Northwestern Europe 14 miles (23 km) off the Cotentin Peninsula of north-west France. (Note: Traditionally known as part of the British Isles, geographically Jersey does not form part of that archipelago. As the Government of Jersey's website states, the island is situated "only 22 km off the northwest coast of France and 137 km south of England". In British law it constitutes one of the British Islands.) At 45 square miles (120 km^{2}), the main island, Jersey, is the largest of the Channel Islands. Although not a sovereign state, Jersey has its own legal, fiscal and governmental systems; on that basis, it is regarded as a small nation or island country. Jersey's territory also includes some surrounding uninhabited islands and rocks. As of 2021, the island had a population of 103,267.

Historically part of the Duchy of Normandy, Jersey remained loyal to the English Crown when the English kings lost mainland Normandy, but it never became part of the Kingdom of England. From then until the end of the Napoleonic Wars, Jersey was at the frontline of Anglo-French Wars and was invaded a number of times, leading to the construction of fortifications such as Mont Orgueil Castle and to a thriving smuggling industry. The island was invaded and occupied by Nazi German forces during the Second World War until 9 May 1945, now celebrated as the island's national day.

Jersey is a parliamentary democracy under a constitutional monarchy, with its own financial, legal and judicial systems, and the power of self-determination. The Bailiff is the civil head of the island, the Chief Minister leads the island's government, and the Lieutenant Governor represents the British monarch, who is the head of state. The island is not part of the United Kingdom and has a separate international identity, but the UK government manages its defence, international representation and certain policy areas, such as nationality law.

The island has a large financial services industry, as well as agriculture and tourism. Its currency is the Pound sterling with a local issue of banknotes and coins. British cultural influence on the island is evident in its use of English as the main language and its participation in British sporting leagues, but the island also has a strong Norman-French culture, reflected by its historic dialect of the Norman language, Jèrriais.

== Name ==
The Channel Islands are mentioned in the Antonine Itinerary as the following: Sarnia, Caesarea, Barsa, Silia and Andium, but Jersey cannot be identified specifically because none corresponds directly to the present names. The name Caesarea has been used as the Latin name for Jersey (also in its French version Césarée) since William Camden's Britannia, and is used in titles of associations and institutions today. The Latin name Caesarea was also applied to the colony of New Jersey as Nova Caesarea.

Andium, Agna and Augia were used in antiquity.

Scholars variously surmise that Jersey and Jèrri derive from jǫrð (Old Norse for 'earth') or jarl ('earl'), or perhaps the Norse personal name Geirr (thus Geirrsey, 'Geirr's Island'). The ending -ey denotes an island, as in Guernsey or Surtsey.

== History ==
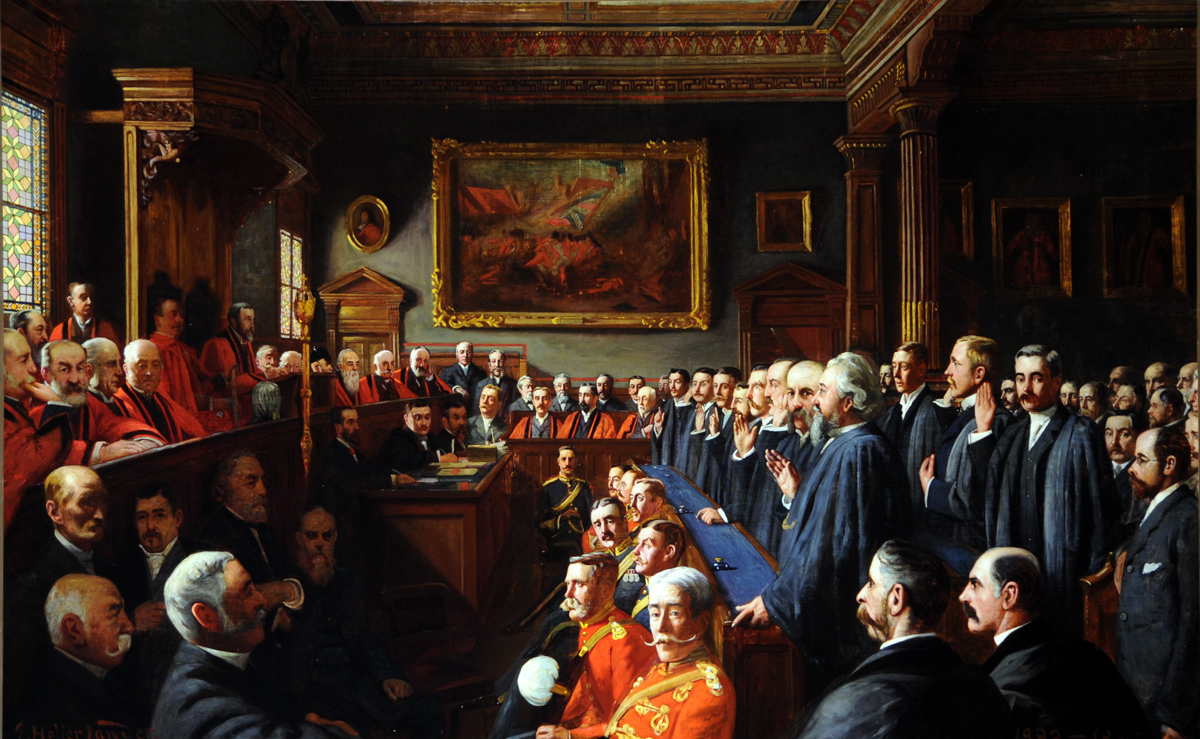
An 1893 painting of the Assize d'Heritage by John St Helier Lander

=== Prehistoric and ancient Jersey ===
The La Cotte de St Brelade site on the southwest coast indicates that what is now Jersey was inhabited by Neanderthals as early as 200-250,000 years ago, when the island was connected to the French mainland. The inland Les Varines site indicates that Jersey was occupied by modern humans of the late Upper Palaeolithic Magdalenian culture towards the end of the last ice age. During the early part of the Mesolithic (when Jersey was inhabited by hunter-gatherers, as indicated by microlith finds), Jersey remained part of France, but had become an island by towards the end of period by 5500 BC. The Neolithic occupation of the island shows the construction of dolmens, such as La Hougue Bie. Evidence of Bronze Age and early Iron Age settlements can be found in many locations around the island.

Archaeological evidence of Roman influence has been found, in particular at Les Landes.

Christianity was brought to the island by migrants from Brittany in c. fifth – sixth century CE. In the sixth century, the island's patron saint Helier lived at the Hermitage on L'Islet (now Elizabeth Castle). Legend states that Helier was beheaded by raiders and subsequently lifted his head and walked to shore.

=== Early Medieval period ===
In the ninth century the island was raided by Vikings and in 933 it was annexed to Normandy by William Longsword. When Duke William the Conqueror became King of England in 1066, the island remained part of the Norman possessions. However, in 1204, when Normandy was returned to the French king, the island remained a possession of the English crown, though never incorporated into England. Although traditionally attributed to the Constitutions of King John, Jersey's self-governance is more accurately founded on a succession of royal charters and long-standing constitutional conventions, with the precise origins of its autonomy remaining a subject of historical debate. Nevertheless, the island continued to follow Norman customs and laws. The King also appointed a Bailiff and a Warden (now Lieutenant-Governor). The period of English rule was marked by wars between England and France, as such a military fortress was built at Mont Orgueil.

During the Tudor period, the split between the Church of England and the Vatican led to islanders adopting the Protestant religion. During the reign of Elizabeth, French refugees brought strict Calvinism to the island, which remained the common religion until 1617. In the late 16th century, islanders travelled across the North Atlantic to participate in the Newfoundland fisheries.

In recognition for help given to him during his exile in Jersey in the 1640s, King Charles II of England gave Vice Admiral Sir George Carteret, bailiff and governor, a large grant of land in the American colonies in between the Hudson and Delaware rivers, which he promptly named New Jersey. It is now a state in the United States.

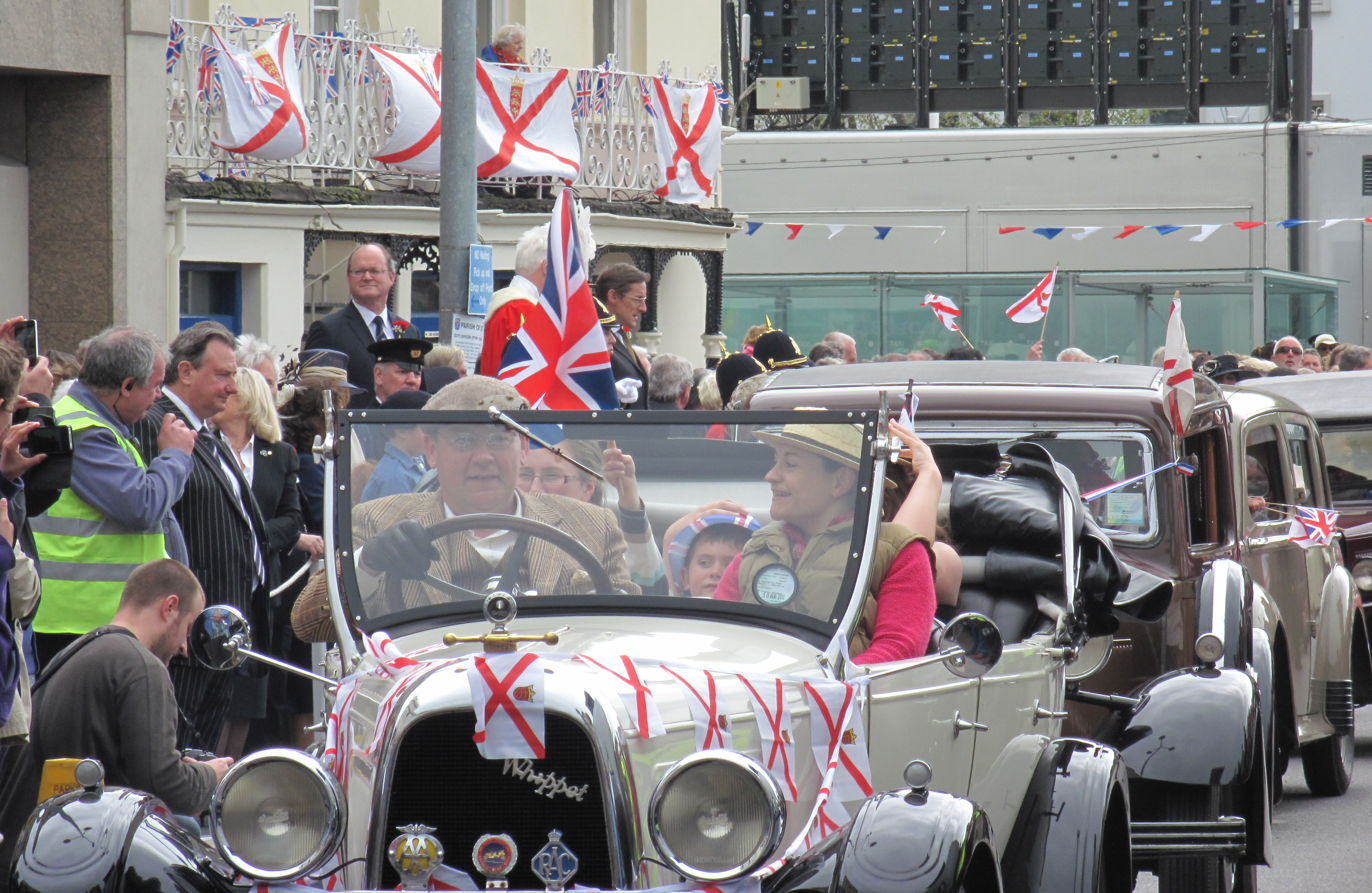
Liberation Day celebrations in Jersey, 9 May 2012

=== Early modern period ===
In 1769, the island suffered food supply shortages, leading to an insurrection on 28 September known as the Corn Riots. The States met at Elizabeth Castle and decided to request help from the King. However, in 1771 the Crown demanded reforms to the island's governance, leading to the Code of 1771 and removed the powers of the Royal Court to make laws without the States.

In 1781, during the American Revolutionary War, the island was invaded by a French force which captured St Helier, but was defeated by Major Peirson's army at the Battle of Jersey.

The 19th century saw the improvement of the road network under General Don, the construction of two railway lines, the improvement of transport links to England, and the construction of new piers and harbours in St Helier. This grew the tourism industry in the island and led to the immigration of thousands of English residents, leading to a cultural shift towards a more anglicised island culture.

Island politics in this period were split between the conservative Laurel party and the progressive Rose party, as the lie of power shifted increasingly to the States from the Crown. In the 1850s, the French author Victor Hugo lived in Jersey, but was expelled for insulting the Queen, so he moved on to Guernsey.

=== 20th century–present ===
During the Second World War, 6,500 Jersey residents were evacuated by their own choice to the UK out of a total population of 50,000. Jersey was occupied by Germany from 1 July 1940 until 9 May 1945, when Germany surrendered. During this time the Germans constructed many fortifications using slave labour imported onto the island from many different countries occupied or at war with Germany. After 1944, supplies from France were interrupted by the D-Day landings, and food on the island became scarce. The SS Vega was sent to the island carrying Red Cross supplies and news of the success of the Allied advance in Europe. During the Nazi occupation, a resistance cell was created by communist activist Norman Le Brocq and the Jersey Communist Party, whose communist ideology of forming a 'United Front' led to the creation of the Jersey Democratic Movement.

The Channel Islands had to wait for the German surrender to be liberated. 9 May is celebrated as the island's Liberation Day, where there are celebrations in Liberation Square. After Liberation, the States were reformed, becoming wholly democratically elected, and universal franchise was implemented. Since liberation, the island has grown in population and adopted new industries, especially the finance industry.

== Politics ==
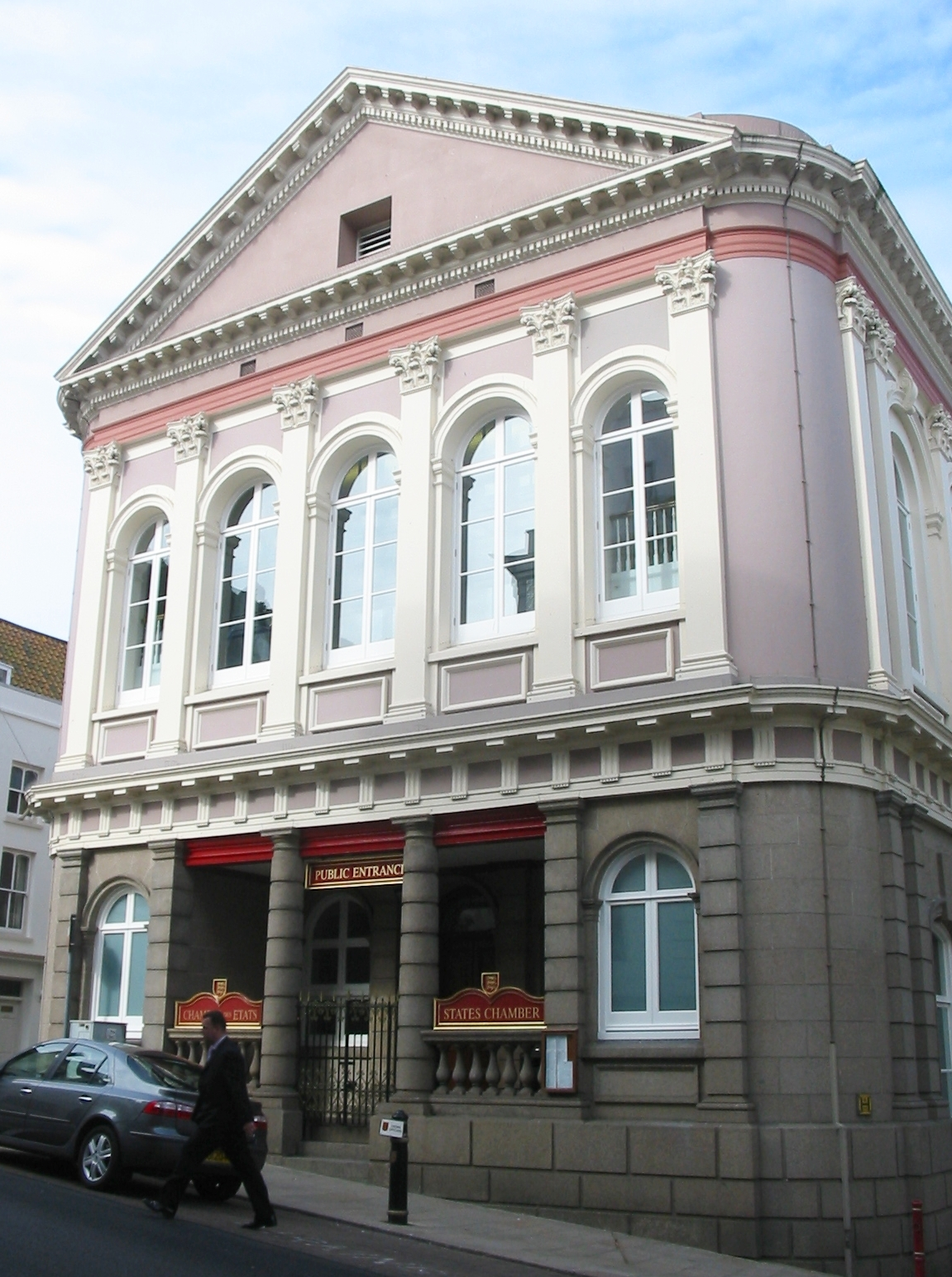
The States Building in St. Helier

Jersey is a Crown Dependency. It is not part of the United Kingdom, but it is part of the 'British Islands', a legal definition encompassing the UK and the Crown Dependences. As a Crown Dependency, Jersey is autonomous and self-governing, with its own independent legal, administrative and fiscal systems. Jersey's government has described Jersey as a "self-governing, democratic country with the power of self-determination". Jersey and its people have historically been described as a nation.

Because Jersey is a dependency of the British Crown, King Charles III reigns in Jersey. "The Crown" is defined by the Law Officers of the Crown as the "Crown in right of Jersey". The King's representative and adviser in the island is the Lieutenant Governor of Jersey – Vice-Admiral Jerry Kyd since 8 October 2022. He is a formal point of contact between Jersey ministers and the UK Government and carries out some ceremonial functions in relation to immigration control, deportation, naturalisation and the issue of passports.

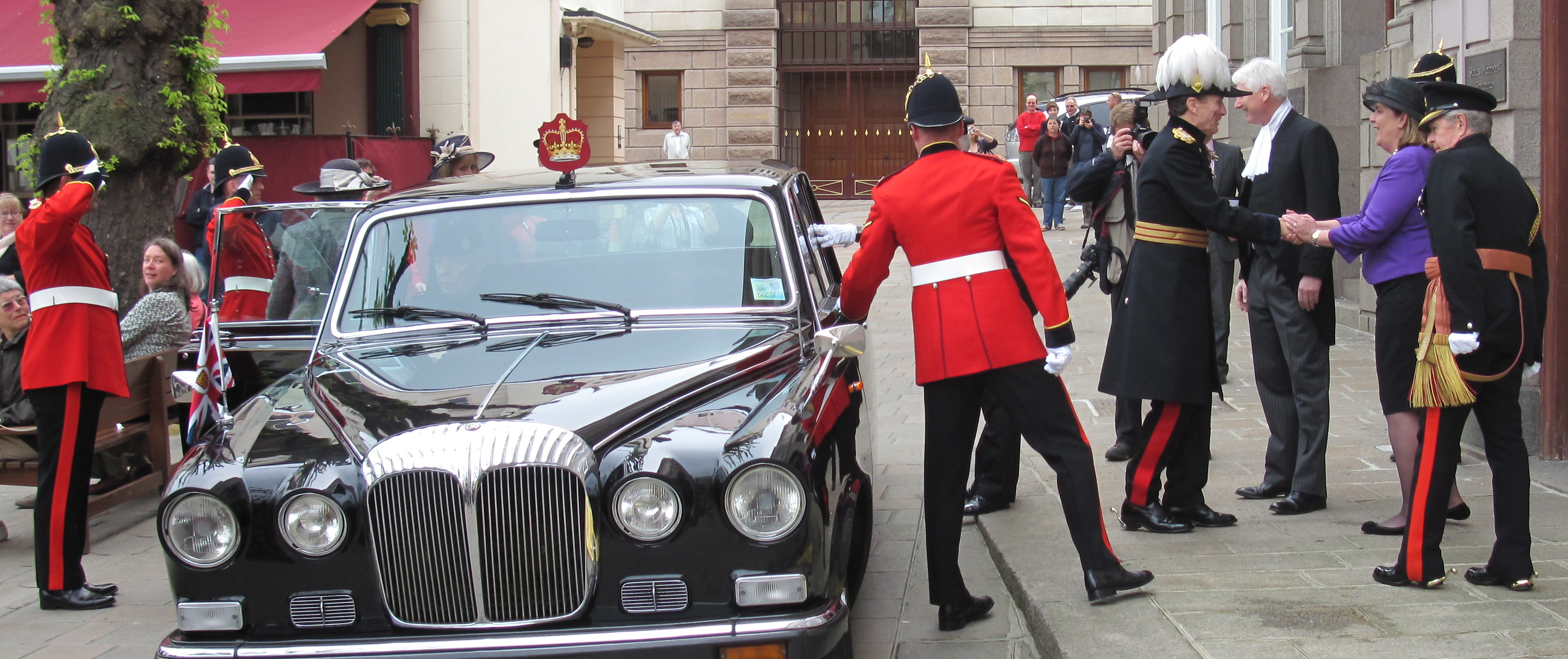
Sir John Chalmers McColl as Lieutenant Governor of Jersey

In 1973, the Royal Commission on the Constitution set out the duties of the Crown to the island as including: ultimate responsibility for the 'good government' of the Crown Dependencies; ratification of island legislation by Order-in-Council (royal assent); international representation, subject to consultation with the island authorities before concluding any agreement which would apply to them; ensuring the islands meet their international obligations; and defence.

=== Legislature and government ===
The States Assembly is Jersey's unicameral legislature. It has 54 members in law, of whom 49 are elected and entitled to vote. Following the 2026 general election, the elected members comprise nine senators elected in a single island-wide constituency, the connétables of the twelve civil parishes, who sit by virtue of their parish offices, and 28 deputies elected from nine constituencies. All elected members serve four-year terms.

The preceding 2022–2026 Assembly had instead comprised twelve connétables and 37 deputies, with no senators. Senators had previously been elected island-wide, but the office was removed as part of reforms implemented for the 2022 election. Proposals to remove the connétables from the Assembly were not adopted. The island-wide senatorial mandate was subsequently restored for the election held on 7 June 2026.

The five remaining members of the States are the Bailiff, the Lieutenant-Governor, the Dean of Jersey, the Attorney General and the Solicitor General. They sit by virtue of their respective constitutional or Crown offices and may speak in the Assembly, but may not vote. The Bailiff is President and ordinarily presides over sittings of the Assembly. The Deputy Bailiff may preside when the Bailiff is unavailable, but is not separately constituted as a member of the States. The Bailiff is also head of Jersey's judiciary and, as civic head of the island, performs various ceremonial functions.

Jersey has historically had low voter turnout. Over the 30 years to 2025, turnout at elections averaged 44.1%, which was lower than in any OECD member country and the lowest of the three Crown Dependencies. Surveys conducted following the 2022 election found that the most commonly reported reasons for not voting included apathy, mistrust and disinterest in the political system.

Executive government is led by the Council of Ministers, comprising the Chief Minister and at least seven other ministers. Ministers are elected by the States Assembly following the selection of the Chief Minister. The Council is formed, and the Chief Minister formally takes office, once the final minister required to constitute it has been selected. The Council coordinates government policy and administration and is accountable to the Assembly.

The Chief Minister and other ministers may appoint one or more elected members as assistant ministers, subject to the statutory aggregate limit on the number of ministers and assistant ministers. Assistant ministers are members of the executive but are not themselves members of the Council of Ministers. The Chief Executive Officer heads the public service. Some governmental and administrative functions are carried out through the island's parishes.

=== Law ===
Jersey is a distinct jurisdiction for cases in multiple jurisdictions (conflict of laws). It is separate from the other jurisdictions in the British Islands, including the other Channel Islands and England and Wales.

Jersey law has been influenced by several different legal traditions, in particular Norman customary law, English common law and modern French civil law. Jersey's legal system is therefore described as 'mixed' or 'pluralistic'. Sources of law are in both the French and English languages, although since the 1950s the main working language of the legal system is English.

The principal court is the Royal Court, with appeals to the Jersey Court of Appeal and, ultimately, to the Judicial Committee of the Privy Council. The Bailiff is head of the judiciary; the Bailiff and the Deputy Bailiff are appointed by the Crown. Other members of the island's judiciary are appointed by the Bailiff. The convening of the Assize d'Heritage is that of the Royal Court of Jersey, the oldest surviving land court in Europe.

=== External relations ===
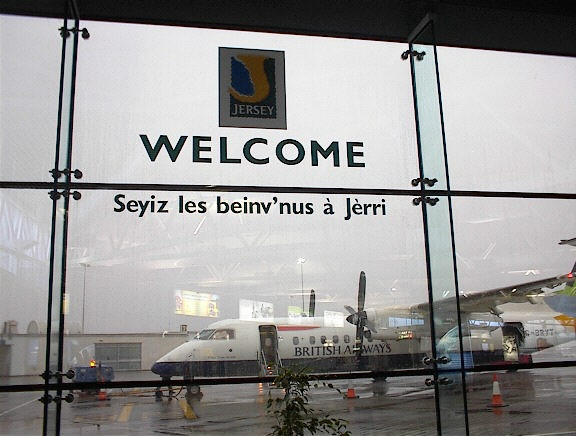
Jersey Airport greets travellers with "Welcome to Jersey" sign in Jèrriais.

Although diplomatic representation is reserved to the Crown, Jersey has been developing its own external relations, especially since in 2007 the UK and Jersey signed an agreement for the development of the international identity of Jersey. It negotiates directly with foreign governments on various matters: for example, tax information exchange agreements have been signed directly by the island.

The external relations of Jersey are overseen by the External Relations Minister of the Government of Jersey. Jersey is a member of the British-Irish Council, the Commonwealth Parliamentary Association and the Assemblée parlementaire de la Francophonie. The government maintains offices (some in partnership with Guernsey) in Caen, London and Brussels.

Jersey independence has in the past been discussed in the States Assembly. Former external relations minister Sir Philip Bailhache has at various times warned that the island may need to become independent. It is not Jersey government policy to seek independence, but the government has stated that the island is prepared if needs to do so.

Jersey's relationship with the European Union is governed by the EU–UK Trade and Cooperation Agreement. It was not part of the EU prior to Brexit. Under this agreement, goods trade between the island and the EU are not subject to tariffs, and Jersey retains sole responsibility for its territorial waters. This latter point has led to tensions between France and Jersey over the permits of French fishermen to fish in Jersey waters.

Jersey also has close relations with Portugal, including the exchangement of tax information; these relations are specifically strong with the Autonomous Region of Madeira, where St. Helier has one of its sister cities, Funchal.

== Administrative divisions ==
Parishes of Jersey

Jersey is divided into twelve parishes (which have civil and religious functions), the largest being St Ouen and the smallest St Clement. They are all named after their parish church. The connétable is the head of the parish. They are elected at island general elections and sit ex oficio in the States Assembly.

The parishes have various civil administrative functions, such as roads (managed by the road committee) and policing (through the Honorary Police). Each parish is governed through direct democracy at parish assemblies, consisting of all eligible voters resident in the parish. The procureurs du bien public are the legal and financial representatives of these parishes.

The parishes of Jersey are further divided into vingtaines (or, in St Ouen, cueillettes).

== Geography ==
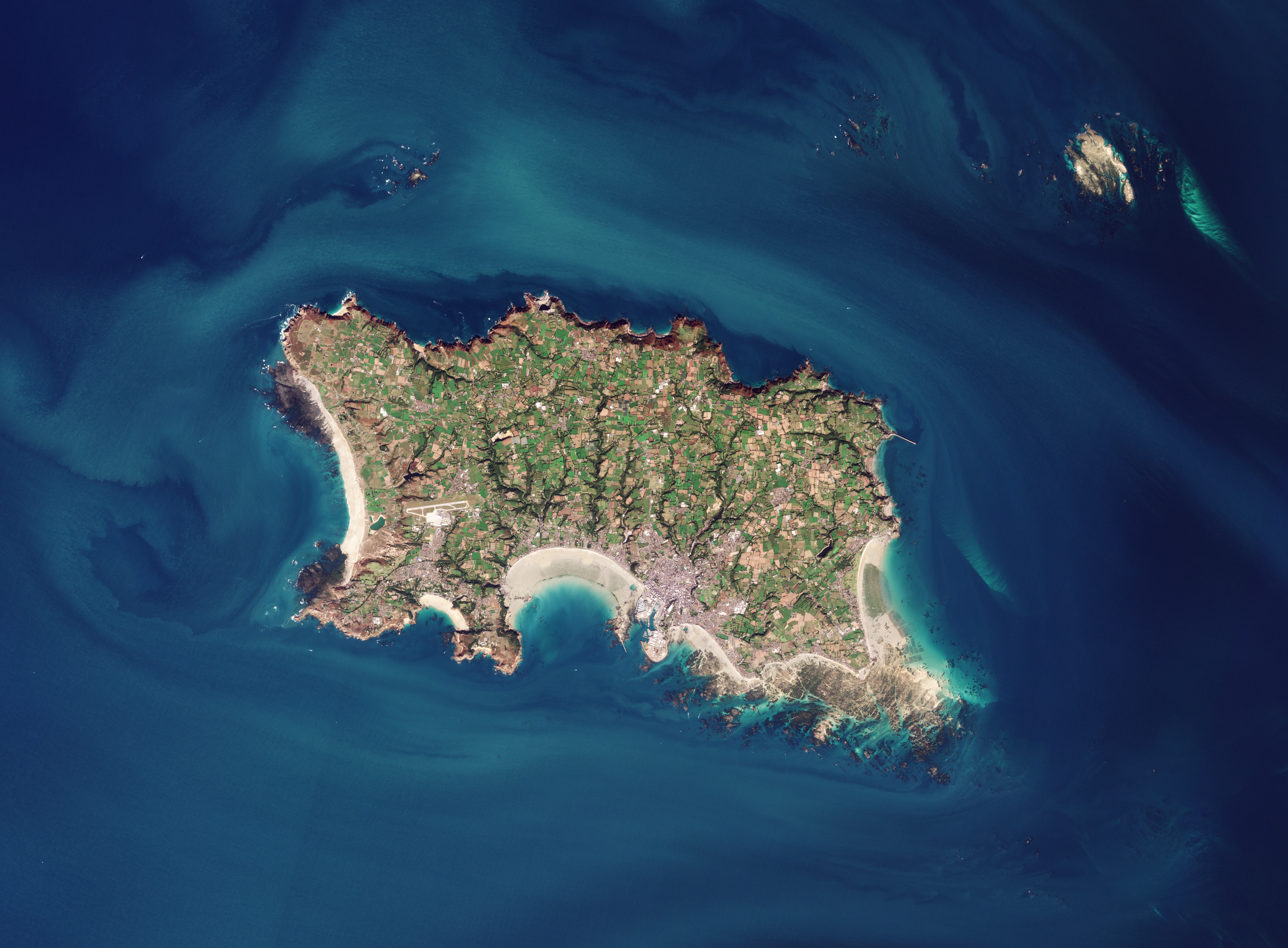
Satellite view of Jersey

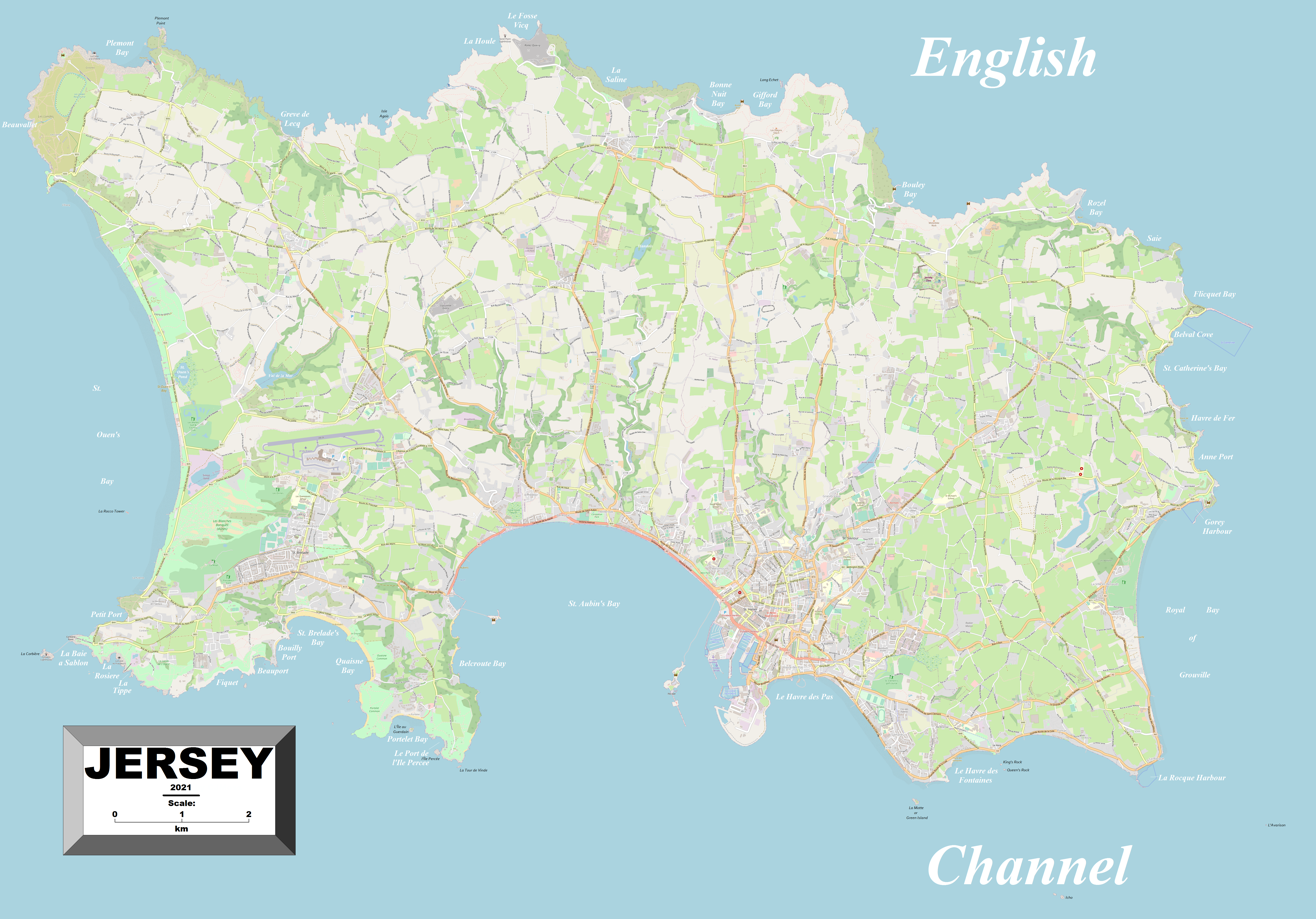
Large map of Jersey

Jersey is an island measuring 46.2 square miles (119.6 km^{2}) (or 66,436 vergées), including reclaimed land and intertidal zone. It lies in the English Channel, about 12 nautical miles (22 km; 14 mi) from the Cotentin Peninsula in Normandy, France, and about 87 nautical miles (161 km; 100 mi) south of Great Britain. It is the largest and southernmost of the Channel Islands and part of the British Isles, with a maximum land elevation of 143 metres (469 ft) above sea level.

About 24% of the island is built-up. Land area dedicated to cultivation is 52% of the island, and around 18% is natural environment.

It lies within longitude -2° W and latitude 49° N. It has a coastline that is 43 miles (70 km) long and a total area of 46.2 square miles (119.6 km^{2}). It measures roughly 9 miles (14 km) from west to east and 5 miles (8 km) north to south, which gives it the affectionate name among locals of "nine-by-five".

The island is characterised by a number of valleys which generally run north-to-south, such as Waterworks Valley, Grands Vaux, Mont les Vaux, although a few run in other directions, such as Le Mourier Valley. The highest point on the island is Les Platons at 136 m (446 ft).

There are several smaller island groups that are part of the Bailiwick of Jersey, such as Les Minquiers and Les Écrehous, however unlike the smaller islands of the Bailiwick of Guernsey, none of these are permanently inhabited.

=== Settlements ===
The largest settlement is the town of St Helier, including the built-up area of southern St Helier and neighbouring areas such as Georgetown, which also plays host to the island's seat of government. The town is the central business district, hosting a large proportion of the island's retail and employment, such as the finance industry.

Outside of the town, many islanders live in suburban and rural settlements, especially along main roads leading out of town, and even the more rural areas of the island have considerable amounts of development (St Ouen, the least densely populated parish, still has 270 persons per square kilometre). The south and east coasts from St Aubin to Gorey are largely urbanised. The second smaller urban area is the Les Quennevais area in St Brelade, which is home to a small precinct of shops, a school, a park, and a leisure centre.

Most people across Jersey regularly travel from the rural settlements to St Helier and from the town to the rural areas for work and leisure purposes.

Housing costs in Jersey are very high. The Jersey House Price Index has at least doubled between 2002 and 2020. The mix-adjusted house price for Jersey is £567,000, higher than any UK region (UK average: £249,000) including London (average: £497,000; highest of any UK region).

=== Climate ===
Jersey has an oceanic climate (Koppen: Cfb), with cool to mild winters and lukewarm to warm summers, both greatly moderated and extremes reduced by the relatively stable sea surface temperatures surrounding the island. The highest temperature recorded was 39.3 °C (102.7 °F), on 25 June 2026, and the lowest temperature recorded was −10.3 °C or 13.5 °F, on 5 January 1894. 2022 was the warmest (and sunniest) year on record; the mean daily air temperature was 13.56 °C (56.41 °F). Typical wind speeds vary between 12 miles per hour (20 km/h) and 25 mph (40 km/h). During the cooler months, extratropical cyclones can produce gales somewhat regularly. Snow is very rare in Jersey. The last significant snowfall event occurred in March 2013, when 14 centimetres (5.5 in) fell, and most recent measurable snowfall occurred on 8–9 January 2024, when 3 to 5 cm (1.2 to 2.0 in) fell.

Extreme weather is rare due to the island's mild climate, but Atlantic windstorms are fairly common in autumn and winter. In November 2023, Jersey was hit by Storm Ciarán, causing heavy rainfall, extremely high winds with gusts of up to 104 mph (167 km/h) and a supercell thunderstorm, producing unusually large hail and the strongest tornado in the British Isles since 2005.

The following table contains the official data for 1981–2010 at Jersey Airport, located 4.5 miles (7.2 km) from St. Helier.

Climate data for Jersey Airport, elevation 84m, 1981–2010 normals
| Month | Jan | Feb | Mar | Apr | May | Jun | Jul | Aug | Sep | Oct | Nov | Dec | Year |
|---|---|---|---|---|---|---|---|---|---|---|---|---|---|
| Record high °C (°F) | 14.0 (57.2) | 18.0 (64.4) | 20.3 (68.5) | 25.0 (77.0) | 34.2 (93.6) | 39.3 (102.7) | 37.9 (100.2) | 36.0 (96.8) | 30.2 (86.4) | 26.0 (78.8) | 21.0 (69.8) | 16.0 (60.8) | 39.3 (102.7) |
| Mean daily maximum °C (°F) | 8.3 (46.9) | 8.4 (47.1) | 10.4 (50.7) | 12.5 (54.5) | 15.8 (60.4) | 18.4 (65.1) | 20.4 (68.7) | 20.6 (69.1) | 18.7 (65.7) | 15.4 (59.7) | 11.7 (53.1) | 9.2 (48.6) | 14.2 (57.6) |
| Daily mean °C (°F) | 6.3 (43.3) | 6.1 (43.0) | 7.9 (46.2) | 9.5 (49.1) | 12.6 (54.7) | 15.1 (59.2) | 17.2 (63.0) | 17.5 (63.5) | 15.8 (60.4) | 13.0 (55.4) | 9.6 (49.3) | 7.1 (44.8) | 11.5 (52.7) |
| Mean daily minimum °C (°F) | 4.3 (39.7) | 3.8 (38.8) | 5.3 (41.5) | 6.5 (43.7) | 9.3 (48.7) | 11.8 (53.2) | 13.9 (57.0) | 14.3 (57.7) | 12.9 (55.2) | 10.6 (51.1) | 7.5 (45.5) | 5.0 (41.0) | 8.8 (47.8) |
| Record low °C (°F) | −10.3 (13.5) | −9.0 (15.8) | −3.3 (26.1) | −1.6 (29.1) | 0.0 (32.0) | 5.9 (42.6) | 9.0 (48.2) | 7.7 (45.9) | 6.0 (42.8) | −2.6 (27.3) | −3.0 (26.6) | −4.0 (24.8) | −10.3 (13.5) |
| Average precipitation mm (inches) | 93.1 (3.67) | 68.9 (2.71) | 66.1 (2.60) | 56.4 (2.22) | 55.6 (2.19) | 47.5 (1.87) | 44.6 (1.76) | 49.5 (1.95) | 63.9 (2.52) | 103.4 (4.07) | 105.4 (4.15) | 111.3 (4.38) | 865.8 (34.09) |
| Mean monthly sunshine hours | 66.1 | 91.6 | 134.0 | 196.5 | 236.7 | 245.4 | 252.7 | 235.3 | 184.6 | 118.8 | 79.9 | 63.2 | 1,904.8 |
Source: Met Office and Voodoo Skies

== Economy ==
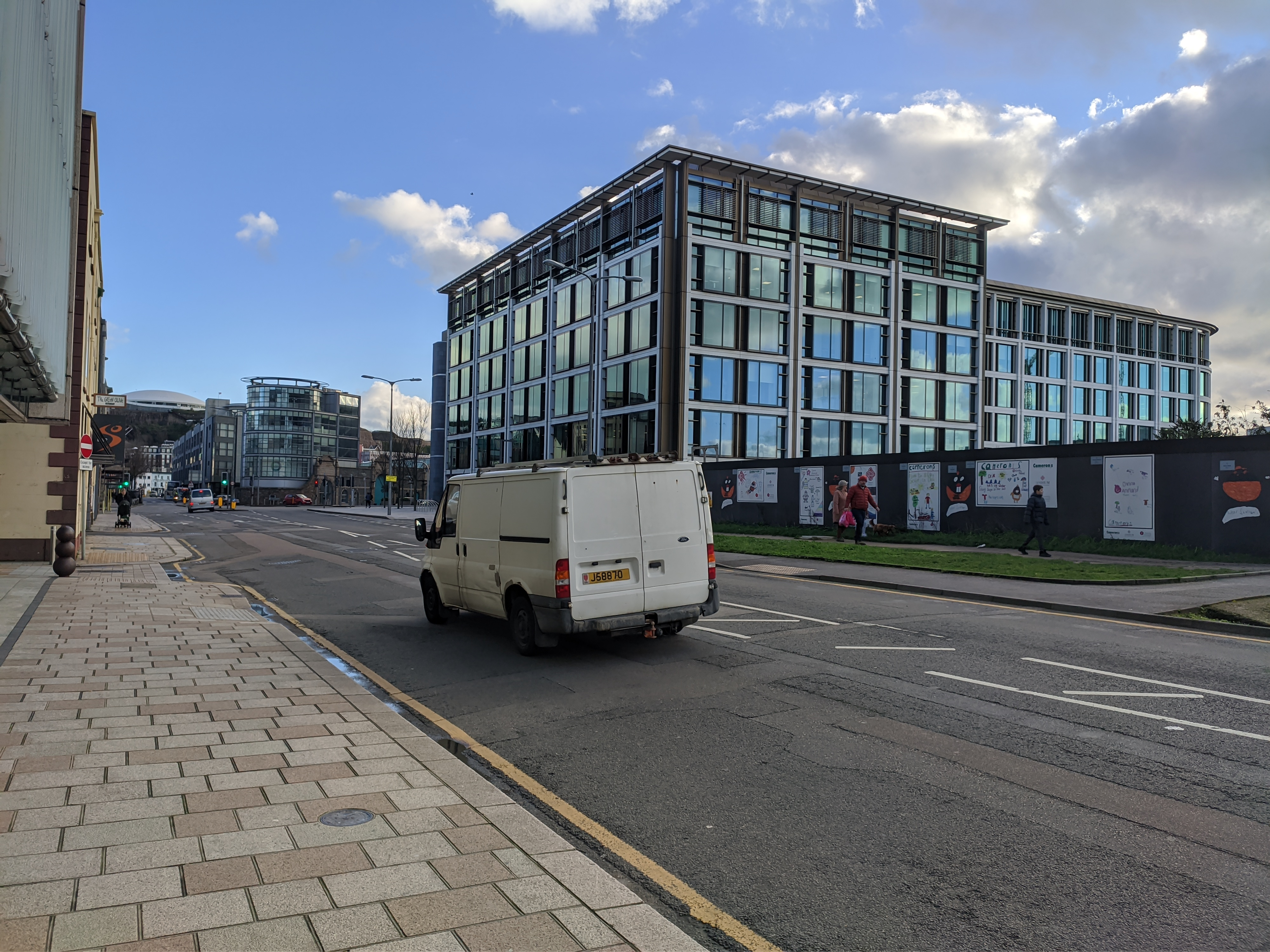
The central business district of St Helier

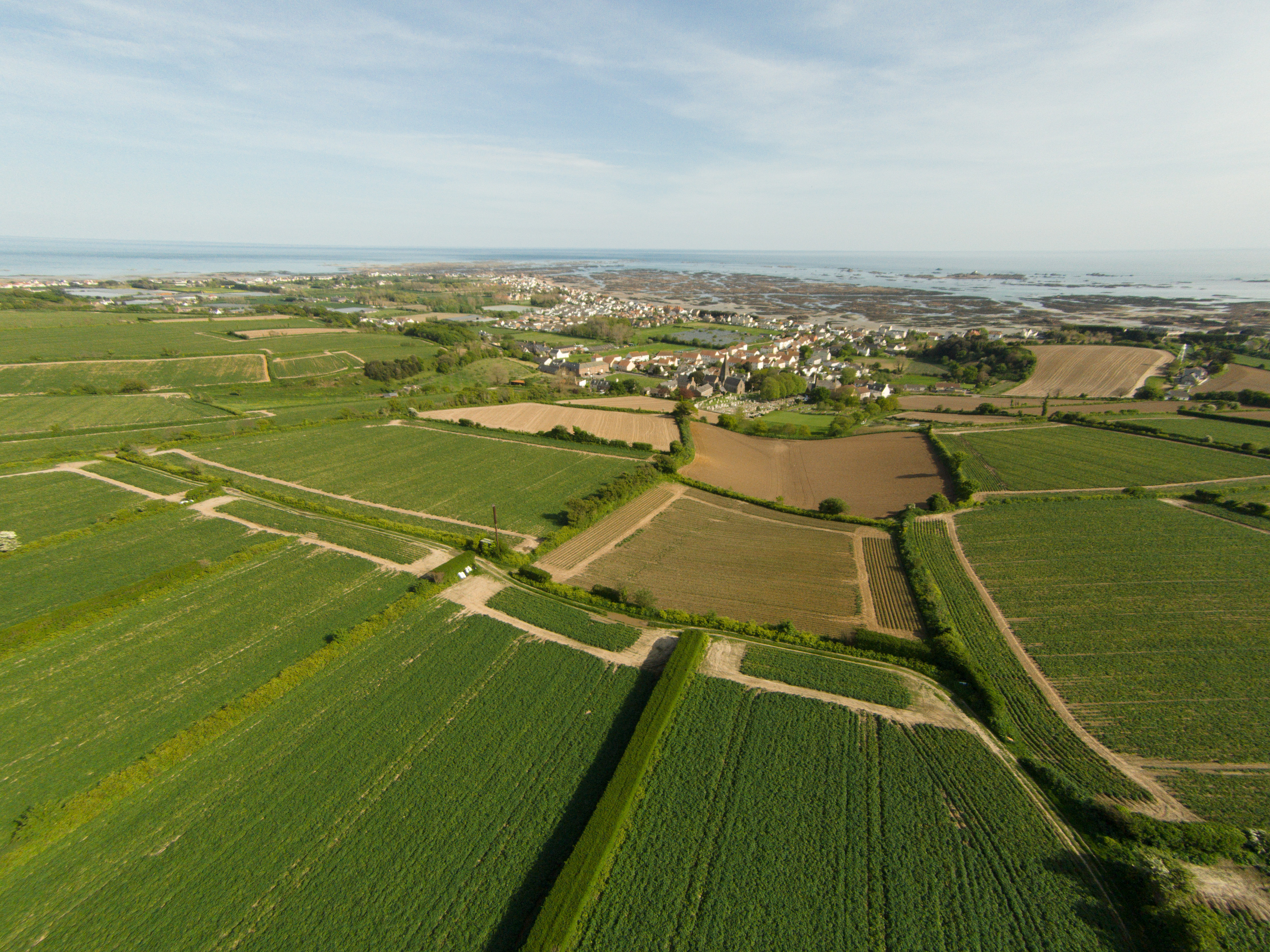
Aerial view of fields in Saint Clement

Jersey's economy is highly developed and services-focused, with a GDP per capita of £45,320 in 2019. It is a mixed market economy, with free market principles and an advanced social security infrastructure. 53,460 people were employed in Jersey as of December 2010: 24% in financial and legal services; 16% in wholesale and retail trades; 16% in the public sector; 10% in education, health and other private sector services; 10% in construction and quarrying; 9% in hotels, restaurants and bars.

Economic sectors in Jersey by GVA (2019)
| Sector | Gross value added | |
| Sector | % of total | £millions |
|---|---|---|
| Financial services | 39.5% | 1,966 |
| Rental income | 15.5% | 771 |
| Other business activities | 11.7% | 580 |
| Public administration | 8.6% | 426 |
| Construction | 7.0% | 350 |
| Wholesale and retail | 6.4% | 319 |
| Hotels, bars and restaurants | 4.2% | 210 |
| Transport, storage and communication | 3.5% | 176 |
| Electricity, gas and water | 1.3% | 65 |
| Agriculture | 1.2% | 59 |
| Manufacturing | 1.0% | 50 |
| Total | | 4,972 |

Thanks to specialisation in a few high-return sectors, at purchasing power parity Jersey has high economic output per capita, substantially ahead of all of the world's large developed economies. Gross national income in 2009 was £3.7 billion (a mean of about £40,000 per head of population). However, there is wide variation, and the typical (median) individual resident's purchasing power and standard of living in Jersey is comparable to that in the UK outside central London.

Jersey is one of the world's largest offshore finance centres. The UK acts as a conduit – an intermediate financial services market which funnels funds onwards (Note: "Conduit-OFCs [offshore financial centres] ... are 'countries that are widely perceived as attractive intermediate destinations in the routing of investments'. Conduit-OFCs typically have low or zero taxes imposed on the transfer of capital to other countries, either via interest payments, royalties, dividends or profit repatriation. In addition, such jurisdictions have highly developed legal systems that are able to cater to the needs of multinational corporations. Conduits play a key role in the global corporate ownership network by allowing the transfer of capital without taxation. In this way, profit from one country can be re-invested in another part of the world paying no or little taxes.") – for financial services between European countries and the island. This sector has attracted controversy: Some critics and detractors have called Jersey a place where the "leadership has essentially been captured by global finance, and whose members will threaten and intimidate anyone who dissents."

Tourism is an important economic sector for the island, however travel to Jersey is very seasonal. Accommodation occupancy is much higher in the summer months, especially August, than in the winter months (with a low in November). The majority of visitors to the island arrive by air from the UK. On 18 February 2005, Jersey was granted Fairtrade Island status.

In 2017, 52% of the Island's area was agricultural land (a decrease since 2009). Major agricultural products are potatoes and dairy produce. Jersey cattle are a small breed of cow widely known for their rich milk and cream; the quality of their meat is also appreciated on a small scale. The herd total in 2009 was 5,090 animals. Fisheries and aquaculture make use of Jersey's marine resources to a total value of over £6 million in 2009.

Along with Guernsey, Jersey has its own lottery called the Channel Islands Lottery, which was launched in 1975.

=== Taxation ===
Jersey is not a tax-free jurisdiction. Taxes (known as 'rates') are levied on properties, and there are taxes on personal income, corporate income and goods and services. Before 2008, Jersey had no value-added tax (VAT). Many companies, such as Amazon and Play.com, took advantage of this and a loophole in European law, known as low-value consignment relief, to establish a tax-free fulfilment industry from Jersey. This loophole was closed by the European Union in 2012, resulting in the loss of hundreds of jobs.

There is a 20% standard rate for Income Tax and a 5% standard rate for GST. The island has a 0% default tax rate for corporations; however, higher rates apply to financial services, utility companies and large corporate retailers. Jersey is considered to be a tax haven. Until March 2019 the island was on the EU tax haven blacklist, but it no longer features on it. In January 2021, the chair of the EU Tax Matters Subcommittee, Paul Tang, criticised the list for not including such "renowned tax havens" as Jersey. In 2020, Tax Justice ranked Jersey as the 16th on the Financial Secrecy Index, below larger countries such as the UK, but still placing it at the lower end of the 'extreme danger zone' for offshore secrecy. The island accounts of 0.46% of the global offshore finance market, making it a small player in the total market. In 2020, the Corporate Tax Haven Index ranked Jersey eighth for 2021, with a haven score (a measure of the jurisdiction's systems to be used for corporate tax abuse) of 100 out of 100; however, the island only has 0.51% on the Global Scale Weight ranking.

=== Transport ===
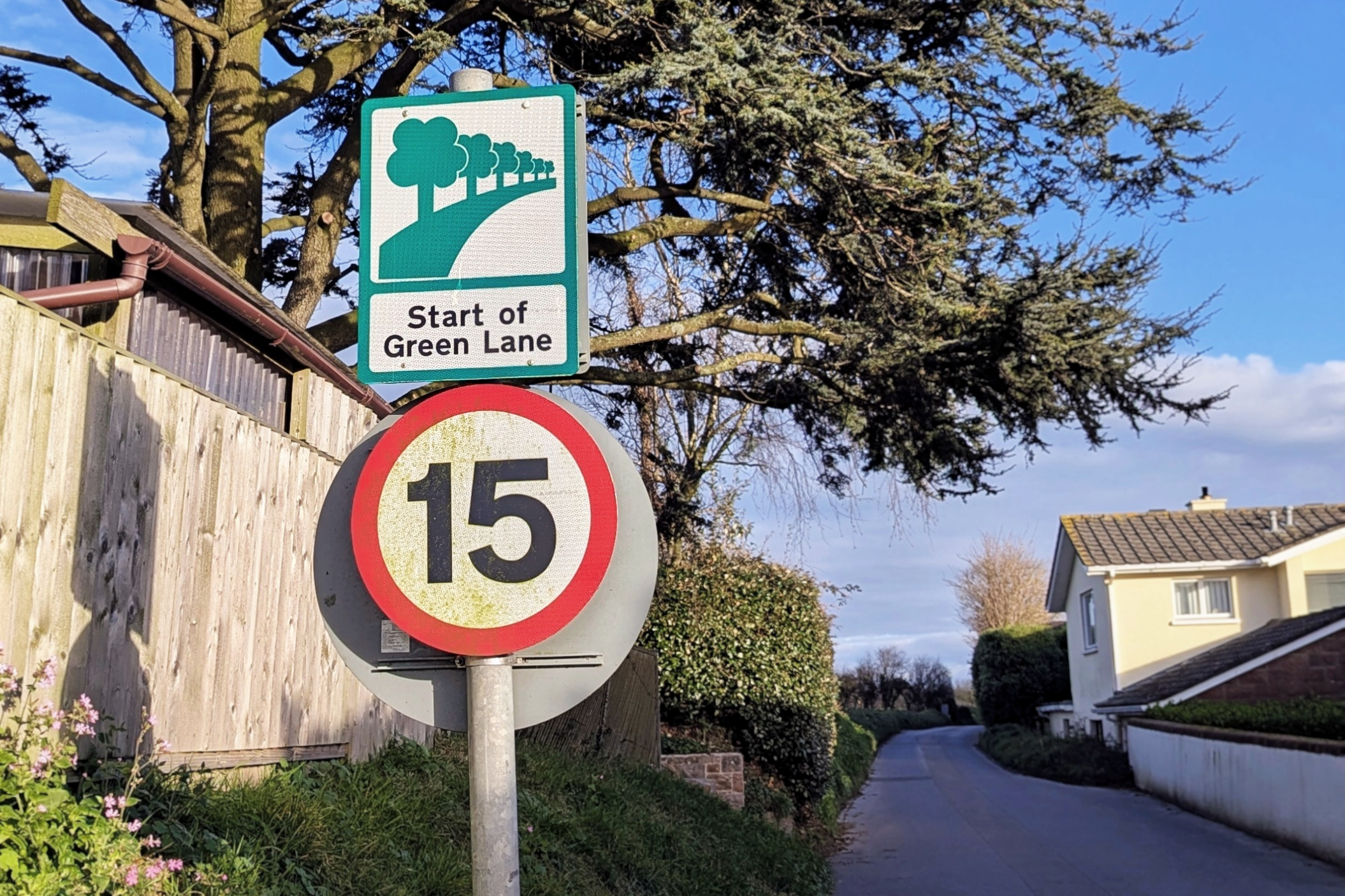
A typical country road in Jersey, with Green Lane signage unique to the island

The primary mode of transport on the island is the motor vehicle. Jersey has a road network consisting of 346 miles (557 km) of roads and there are a total of 124,737 motor vehicles registered on the island as of 2016. Jersey has a large network of narrow country lanes, some of which are classified as 'Green Lanes', which have a 15 mph speed limit and where priority is afforded to pedestrians, cyclists and horse riders.

The public bus network in Jersey has been regulated by the Government since 2002, replacing a de-regulated, commercial service. It is operated on a sole-operator franchise model, currently contracted to LibertyBus, a company owned by Kelsian Group. LibertyBus also operate the school bus services.

Jersey has an airport and a number of ports, which are all operated by Ports of Jersey.

=== Currency ===
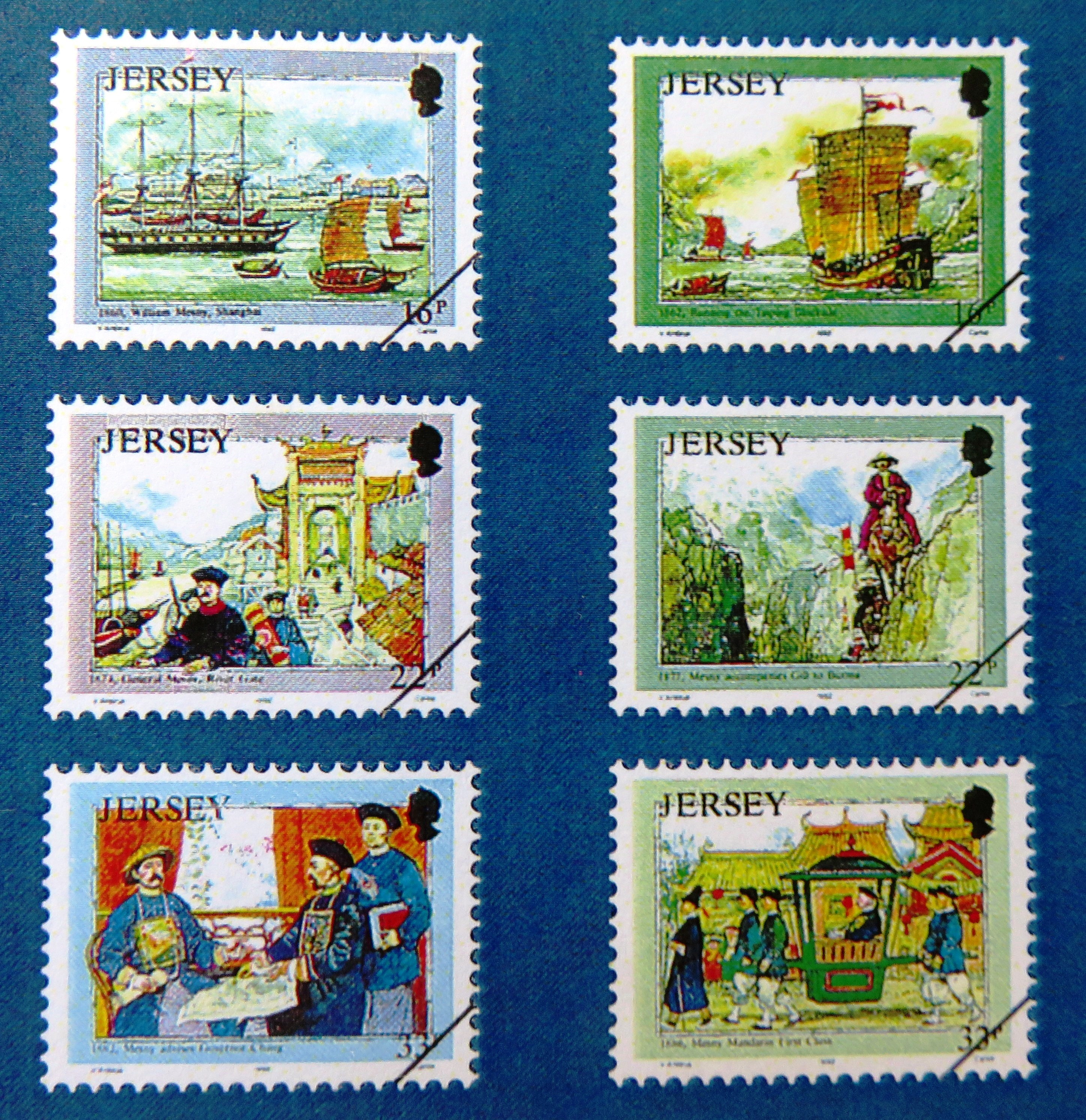
Jersey stamps commemorating the 150th anniversary of the birth of General William Mesny

Jersey's monetary policy is linked to the Bank of England. The official currency of Jersey is the pound sterling. Jersey issues its own postage stamps, banknotes (including a £1 note which is not issued in the UK) and coins that circulate alongside all other sterling coinage. Jersey currency is not legal tender outside Jersey; however it is "acceptable tender" in the UK and can be surrendered at banks in exchange for UK currency.

In July 2014, the Jersey Financial Services Commission approved the establishment of the world's first regulated Bitcoin fund, at a time when the digital currency was being accepted by some local businesses.

== Demography ==
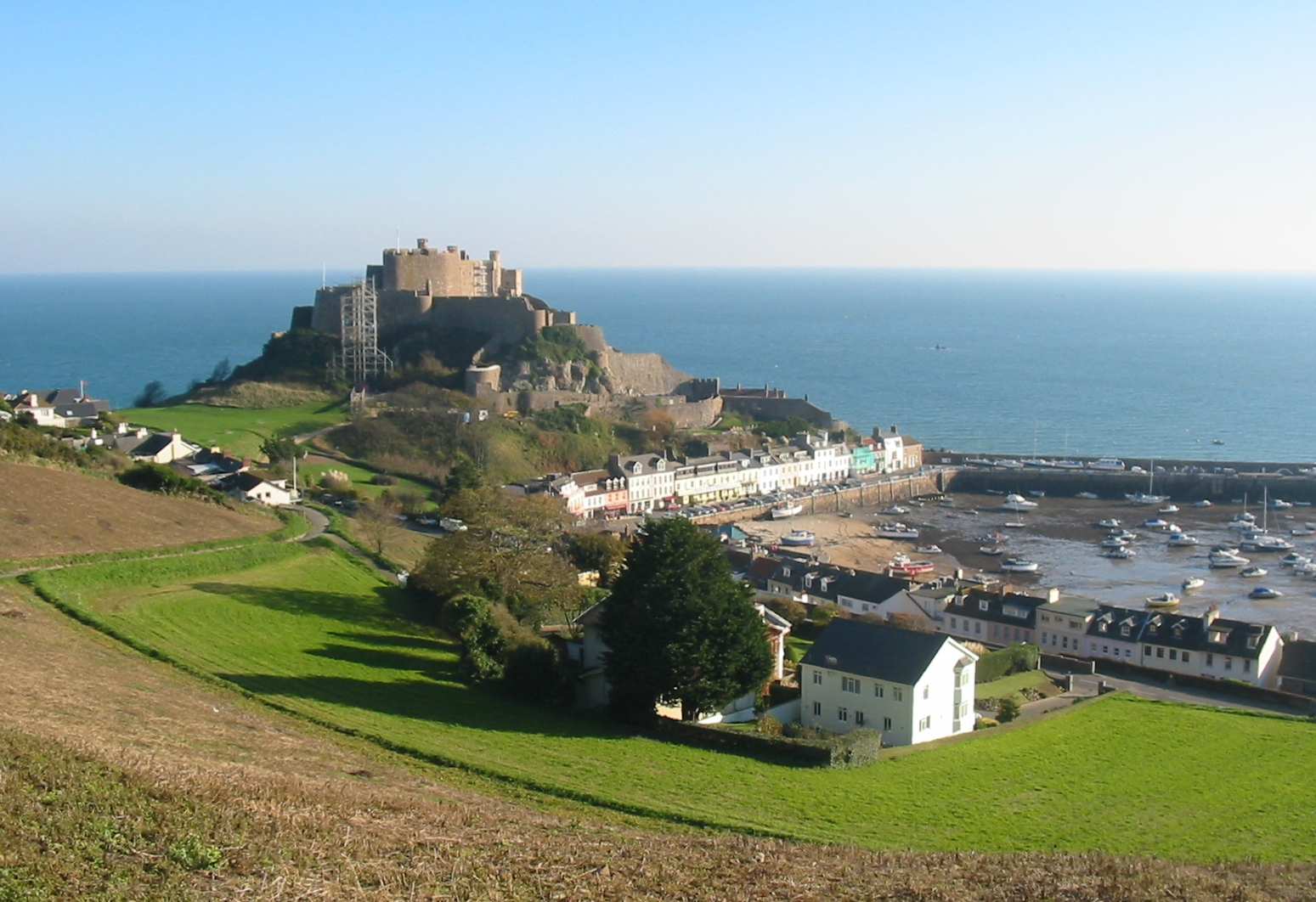
Mont Orgueil was built in the 13th century after its split from Normandy.

Censuses have been undertaken in Jersey since 1821. In the 2021 census, the total resident population was estimated to be 103,267, of whom 35% live in St Helier, the island's only town. Approximately half the island's population was born in Jersey; 29% of the population were born elsewhere in the British Isles, 8% in continental Portugal or Madeira, 9% in other European countries and 5% elsewhere.

Historical population
| Year | Pop. | ±% |
|---|---|---|
| 1871 | 56,627 | — |
| 1951 | 55,244 | −2.4% |
| 1961 | 59,489 | +7.7% |
| 1971 | 69,329 | +16.5% |
| 1981 | 76,050 | +9.7% |
| 1991 | 84,082 | +10.6% |
| 2001 | 87,186 | +3.7% |
| 2011 | 97,857 | +12.2% |
| 2021 | 103,267 | +5.5% |

=== Nationality and citizenship ===
Jersey people are the native nation on the island; however, they do not form a majority of the population. Jersey people are often called Islanders or, in individual terms, Jerseyman or Jerseywoman. Jersey people did not generally identify themselves as English prior to the Union of Britain. Jersey was culturally and geographically much closer to Normandy and there were limited cross-Channel links. However, wars with France, including invasions of Jersey, grew loyalty to Britain over time and the French came more and more to be seen as a distinct people. By the start of the 19th century, Jersey people generally identified as British, which can be seen through the treatment of the Breton immigrants of the time as a distinct nation. The growth of the British migrant population strengthened the role of English and the British cultural influence. Finally, the introduction of compulsory education – which was exclusively in English – and the period of the Occupation reduced the traditional and Norman cultural influences and increased British cultural practices and pride in British nationhood among the island population.

Nationality law in Jersey is conferred by the British Nationality Act 1981 extended to the island by an Order in Council with the consent of the States of Jersey. British nationality law confers British citizenship onto those with suitable connections to Jersey. The Lieutenant Governor's office issues British passports (specifically the Jersey variant) to British citizens with a connection to Jersey by residency or birth.

=== Immigration ===
Jersey is constitutionally entitled to restrict immigration by non-Jersey residents, but control of immigration at the point of entry cannot be introduced for British, certain Commonwealth and EEA nationals without change to existing international law.

Jersey is part of the Common Travel Area (CTA), a zone which encompasses the Crown Dependencies, the United Kingdom and the Republic of Ireland. This means that for citizens of the Common Travel Area jurisdictions a passport is not required to travel from Jersey to any of these jurisdictions (or vice versa). The Government recommends all travellers bring photo ID, since it may need to be checked by customs or police officers and is generally required by commercial transport providers into the island. Due to the CTA, Jersey-born British citizens in the rest of the CTA and British and Irish citizens in Jersey have the right to access social benefits, access healthcare, access social housing support and to vote in general elections.

For non-CTA travel, Jersey maintains its own immigration and border controls (although most travel into the Bailiwick is from the rest of the CTA), however UK immigration legislation may be extended to Jersey (subject to exceptions and adaptations) following consultation with Jersey and with Jersey's consent.

To control population numbers, Jersey operates a system of registration which restricts the right to live and work in the island according to certain requirements. To move to Jersey or work in Jersey, everyone (including Jersey-born people) must be registered and have a registration card. There are a number of statuses:

Residential and employment statuses
| Status | Requirements | Housing | Work |
|---|---|---|---|
| Entitled | Most Jersey-born residents (permanently)Long-term residents (at least 10 years) | Can buy, sell or lease any property | Can work anywhere |
| Licensed | Certain essential workers | Can buy, sell or lease most property | Permission required |
| Entitled to work | Long-term residents (at least 5 years)Spouse or civil partner of someone who is entitled to work or higher. | Can lease 'registered' property | Can work anywhere |
| Registered | All others | Can lease 'registered' property | Permission required |

==== History of immigration ====
Until the 19th century, there was generally limited immigration to the island, especially by English people. Jersey was quite far from Britain (taking days to travel between England and the islands) and culturally distinct (the locals predominantly speaking Norman French). However, from the 16th to 19th centuries, Jersey became home to French religious refugees, particularly Protestants after the repeal of the Edict of Nantes.

From the early 19th century, the island's economic boom attracted economic migrants. By 1841, of the 47,544 population, 11,338 were born in the British Isles outside of Jersey. From the 1840s onwards, agricultural workers came from neighbouring Brittany and mainland Normandy, both due to the booming economy of Jersey and the economic situation in northern France. The new potato season coincided with the time of least agricultural activity in Brittany and Normandy. While many returned to France, some settled in the island.

Between 1851 and 1921, the Jersey population fell by 12.8% (possibly up to 18%). The economic boom ended in the 1850s leading to significant emigration, including to British colonies. A 1901 report by the States concluded that by 1921, the number of births to foreign-born fathers would be equal to those to Jersey-born fathers, describing the immigration situation as a "formidable invasion, although peaceful", and predicted this would have a large impact on the island's socio-political situation.

After World War II, when the island had only 55,244 residents, it saw a period of rapid population increase. By 1991, the population was 84,082. The booming tourism industry required a large volume of relatively low cost labour, so the island turned to Madeira for seasonal staff. Between 1961 and 1981, the Portuguese-born population grew 0.2% to 3.1% of the population. In 2021, this figure was 8%. Since the fall of the Berlin Wall, the new source of cheap labour for the island has been Polish people, whose population has grown from non-existent to 3%.

Immigration has helped give aspects of Jersey a distinct urban character, particularly in and around the parish of St Helier. This has led to ongoing debates about the incompatibility of development and sustainability throughout the island.

=== Religion ===
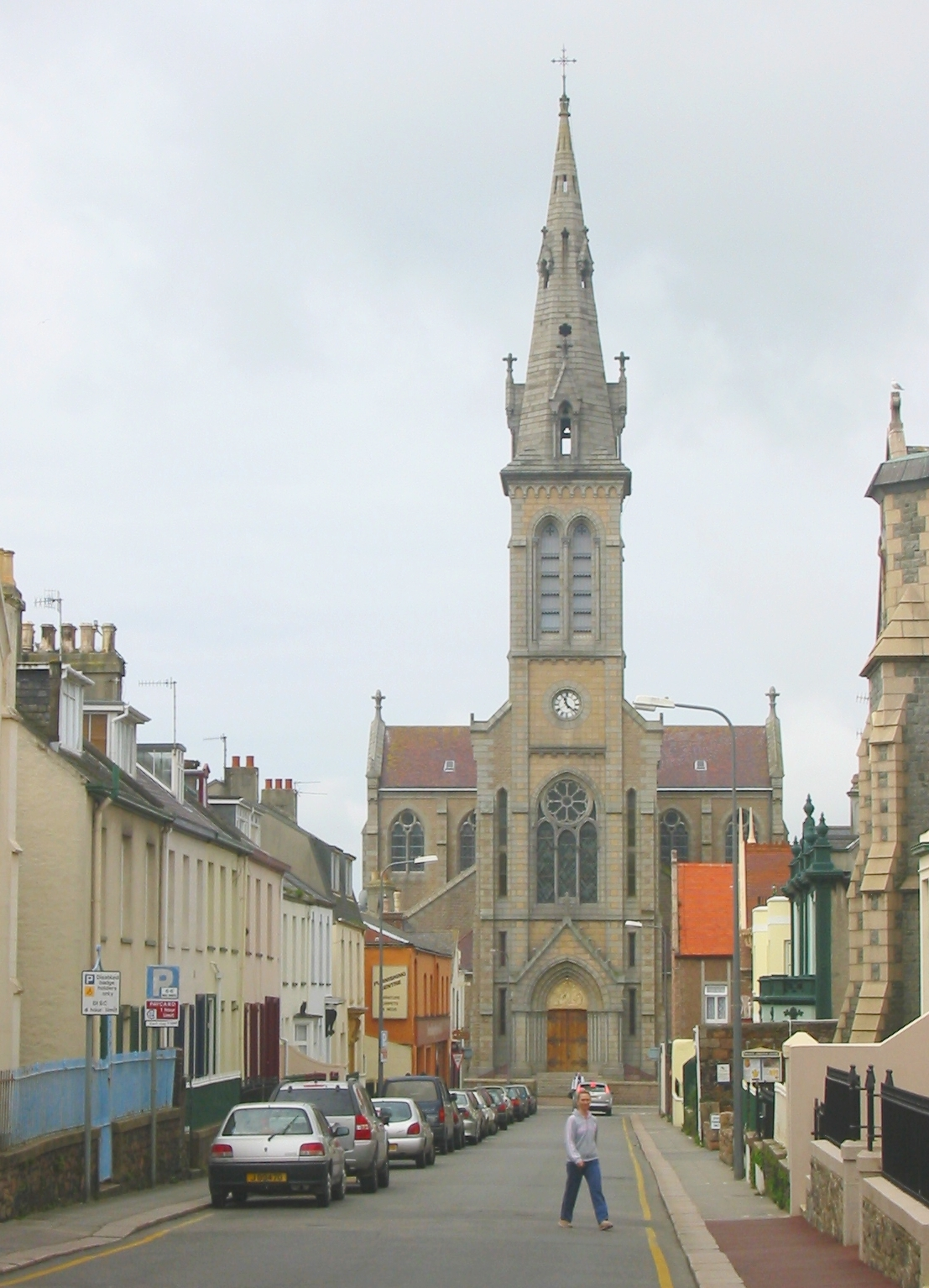
St Thomas' Catholic Church in St Helier

Jersey's patron saint is Saint Helier, after whom the capital town is named. From the fifth century, the island was under the Bishop of Coutances, until being transferred to the Diocese of Winchester in 1568. Jersey became "formally attached" to the Diocese of Salisbury in November 2022. The established church is the Church of England, presided over in the island by the Dean, who is ex officio a States Member, but has no vote. The primary churches are the parish churches, which are 12 ancient Anglican churches, one in each parish centre, though other churches do exist.

According to a 2015 survey of islanders, 54% of adults have a religion. Christianity is the predominant religion in the island, with over half of islanders identifying as Christian in some form. The largest belief demographic is "no religion" with 39% of the population.

Religion in Jersey
| Religion | Percentage (2015) |
|---|---|
| No religion | 39% |
| All religious | 54% |
| Anglican | 23% |
| Catholic | 22.5% |
| Other Christian | 6.8% |
| Other religion | 3% |

== Culture ==
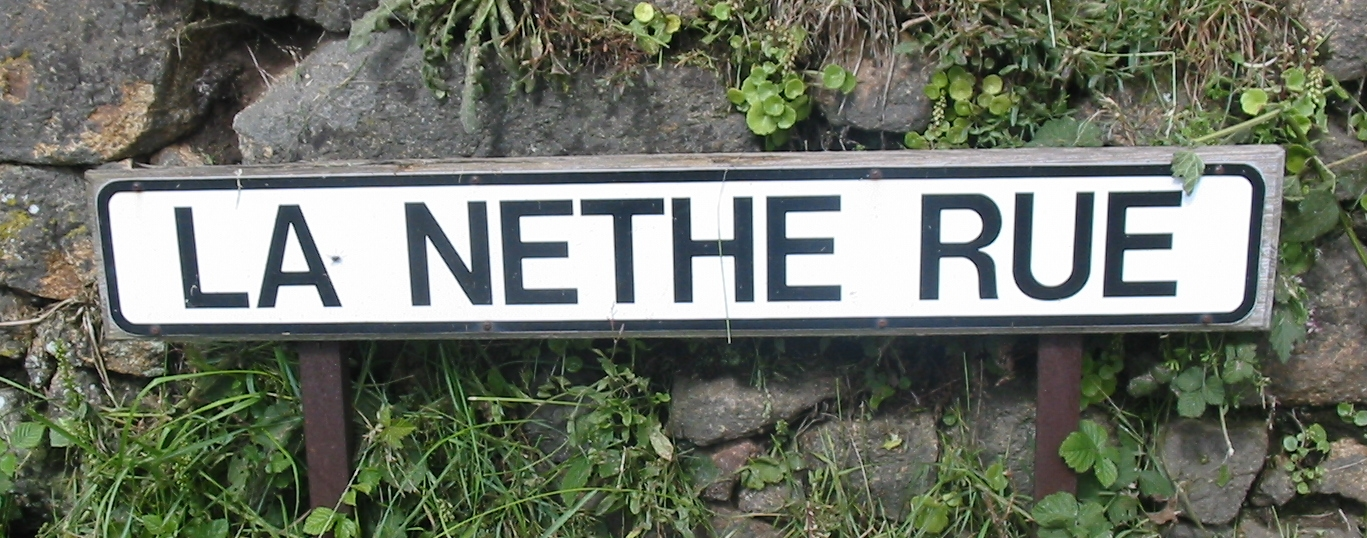
Jèrriais road sign ("The black road") in Saint Ouen

British cultural influence on the island is evident in its use of English as the main language and the pound sterling as its primary currency. Additional British cultural similarities include: driving on the left, access to British television, newspapers and other media, a school curriculum following that of England, and the popularity of British sports, including football and cricket. The island also has a strong Norman-French culture, such as its historic dialect of the Norman language, Jèrriais, being one of only two places in Normandy with government status for the language (the other being Guernsey), as well as the use of standard French in legal matters and officially in use as a government language, strong cultural ties to mainland Normandy as a part of the Normandy region, and place names with French or Norman origins. The island has very close cultural links with its neighbouring islands in the Bailiwick of Guernsey, and they share a good-natured rivalry.

=== Cultural events ===
The Battle of Flowers is a carnival that has been held annually in August since 1902. Other festivals include La Fête dé Noué (Christmas festival), La Faîs'sie d'Cidre (cidermaking festival), the Battle of Britain air display, Weekender Music Festival, food festivals, and parish events.

The Jersey Eisteddfod is an annual festival celebrating local culture. It is split into performing arts (e.g. dance, music, modern languages) and creative arts (e.g. needlework, photography, craft).

=== Art ===
Archaeologists have discovered stone planquettes with abstract designs made by the Magdalenians and dating to the Upper Palaeolithic; these are the oldest pieces of art discovered in the British Isles as of 2023.

The island has produced a number of notable artists. John St Helier Lander (1868–1944) was a portrait painter born in St Helier in 1868; he was a portraitist for the Royal Family. Edmund Blampied also lived around the same period; he was known for his etchings and drypoint. Other famous historic artists include John Le Capelain, John Everett Millais and Philip Ouless. There are also several contemporary Jersey artists, such as Ian Rolls, known for painting quirky landscape paintings.

Jersey also has historic connections to French art. French artist René Lalique created the stained glass windows at St Matthew's Church. No similar Lalique commission survives elsewhere in the world. Artist partners Claude Cahun and Marcel Moore were born in France but moved to and died in the island.

=== Television and media ===
The popular 1980s BBC detective drama Bergerac, starring John Nettles, was set in Jersey. The series was recently revived with a new cast by UKTV.

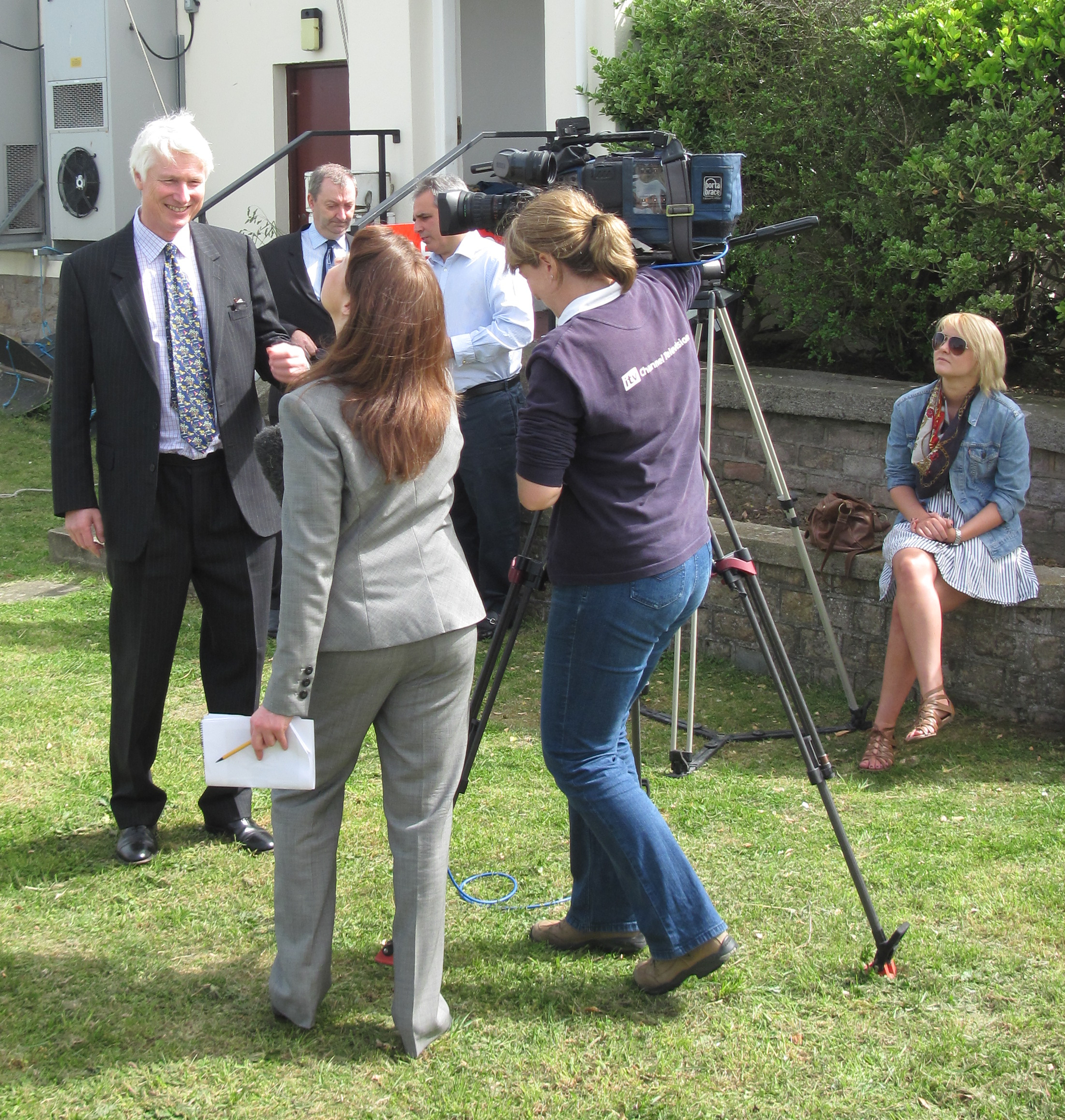
A Channel Television crew interview the Bailiff of Jersey

BBC Radio Jersey provides a radio service, and BBC Channel Islands News provides a joint television news service with Guernsey. ITV Channel Television is a regional ITV franchise shared with the Bailiwick of Guernsey but with its headquarters in Jersey. Radio services are also provided by Channel 103, among other companies.

Bailiwick Express is one of Jersey's digital online news sources. Jersey has only one newspaper, the Jersey Evening Post, which is printed six days a week, and has been in publication since 1890.

=== Music ===
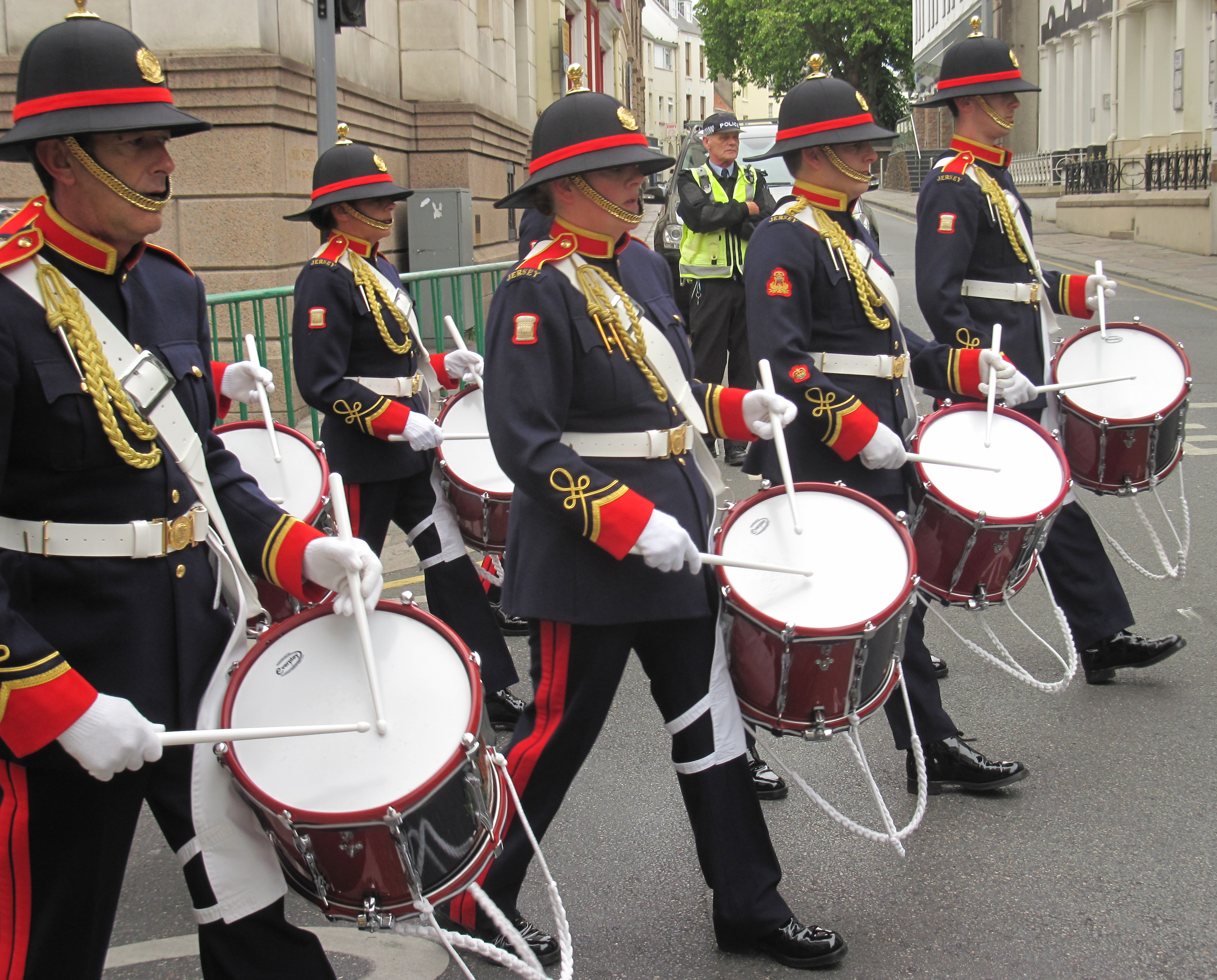
The Band of the Island of Jersey play at many events.

Little is known of the history of music in the islands, though fieldwork has recorded folk songs from the Channel Islands, mostly in French. The folk song Chanson de Peirson is unique to the island.

In contemporary music, Guru Josh, who was born in Jersey, produced house and techno music. He was most notable for his internationally successful debut hit Infinity and its re-releases, reaching number one in numerous European countries. Rock and pop artist Nerina Pallot was raised on the island and has enjoyed international success, and has written songs for famous artists like Kylie Minogue.

The island has a summer music festival scene stretching from mid-June to late September including Good Vibrations, Out-There, the Weekender (the largest festival in the Channel Islands) and Electric Park.

=== Theatre ===
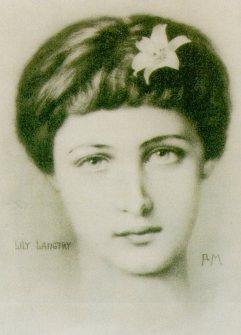
Actress Lillie Langtry, nicknamed the Jersey Lily

There are two theatres on the island: the Jersey Opera House and the Jersey Arts Centre. Lillie Langtry is probably the most famous actress from the island. She was born in Jersey and became an actress on the West End in the late 19th century. She was the first socialite to appear on stage and the first celebrity to endorse a commercial product. She was also famous for her relationships with notable figures, including the Prince of Wales, later Edward VII. She is buried in St Saviour's Church graveyard.

=== Cinema ===
In 1909, T. J. West established the first cinema in the Royal Hall in St. Helier, which became known as West's Cinema in 1923 and was demolished in 1977. The first talking picture, The Perfect Alibi, was shown on 30 December 1929 at the Picture House in St. Helier. The Jersey Film Society was founded on 11 December 1947 at the Café Bleu, West's Cinema. The large Art Deco Forum Cinema was opened in 1935; during the German occupation this was used for German propaganda films.

The Odeon Cinema was opened 2 June 1952 and was later rebranded in the early 21st century as the Forum cinema. Its owners, however, struggled to meet tough competition from the Cineworld Cinemas group, which opened a 10-screen multiplex on the waterfront centre in St. Helier on reclaimed land in December 2002, and the Odeon closed its doors in late 2008. The Odeon is now a listed building.

First held in 2008, the Branchage Jersey International Film Festival attracts filmmakers from all over the world. The 2001 movie The Others was set on the island in 1945 shortly after liberation.

=== Food and drink ===
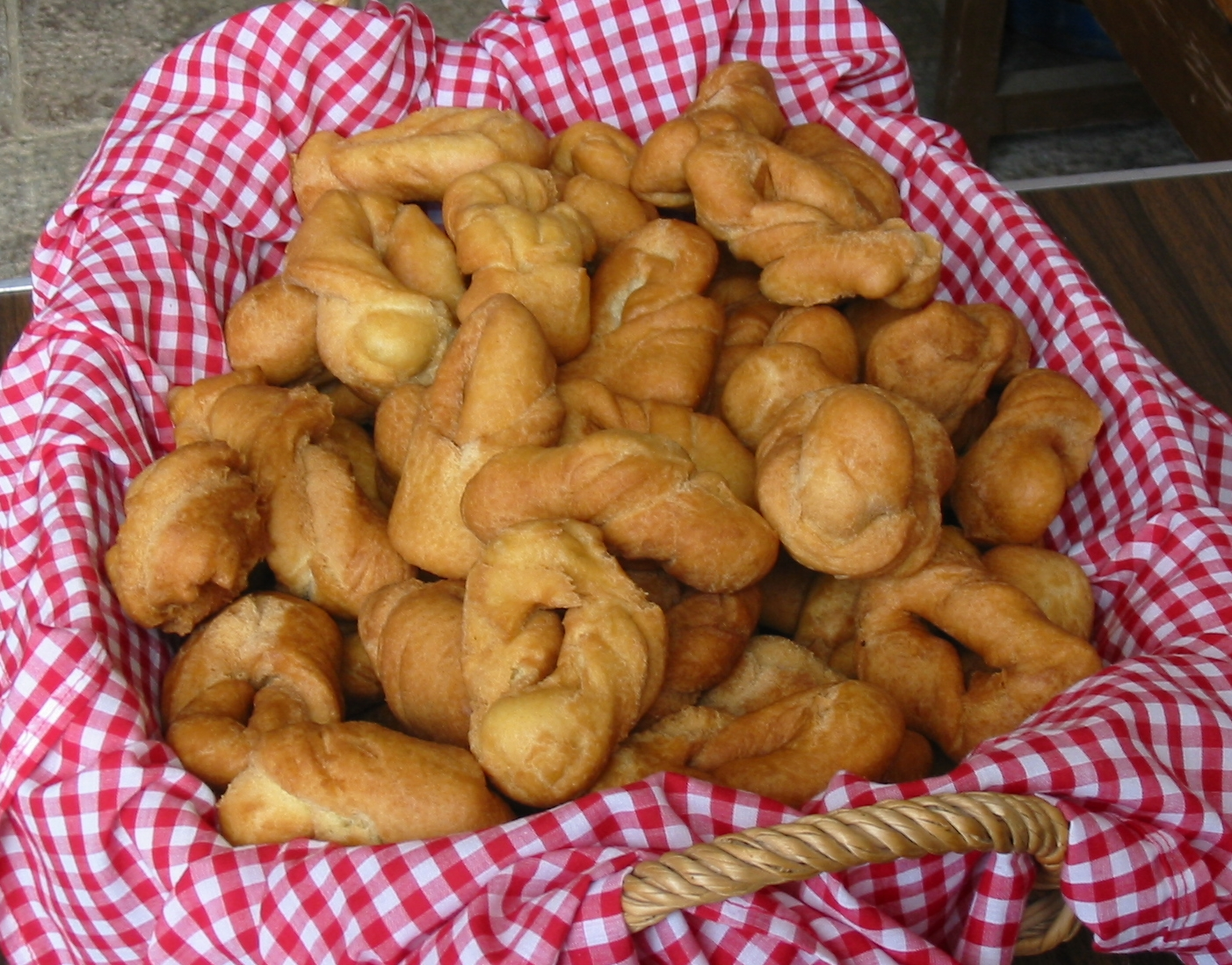
Jersey wonders, or mèrvelles, are a favourite snack consisting of fried dough, found especially at country fêtes. According to tradition, the success of cooking depends on the state of the tide.

Seafood has traditionally been important to the cuisine of Jersey: mussels (called moules in the island), oysters, lobster and crabs – especially spider crabs – ormers and conger.

Jersey milk being very rich, cream and butter have played a large part in insular cooking. Jersey Royal potatoes are the local variety of new potato, and the island is famous for its early crop of Chats (small potatoes) from the south-facing côtils (steeply sloping fields). They were originally grown using vraic as a natural fertiliser, giving them their own individual taste; only a small portion of those grown in the island still use this method. They are eaten in a variety of ways, often simply boiled and served with butter or when not as fresh fried in butter.

Apples historically were an important crop. Bourdélots are apple dumplings, but the most typical speciality is black butter (lé nièr beurre), a dark spicy spread prepared from apples, cider and spices. Cider used to be an important export. After decline and near-disappearance in the late 20th century, apple production is being increased and promoted. Besides cider, apple brandy is produced. Other production of alcohol drinks includes wine, and in 2013 the first commercial vodkas made from Jersey Royal potatoes were marketed.

Among other traditional dishes are cabbage loaf, Jersey wonders (les mèrvelles), fliottes, bean crock (les pais au fou), nettle (ortchie) soup, and vraic buns.

=== Sport ===
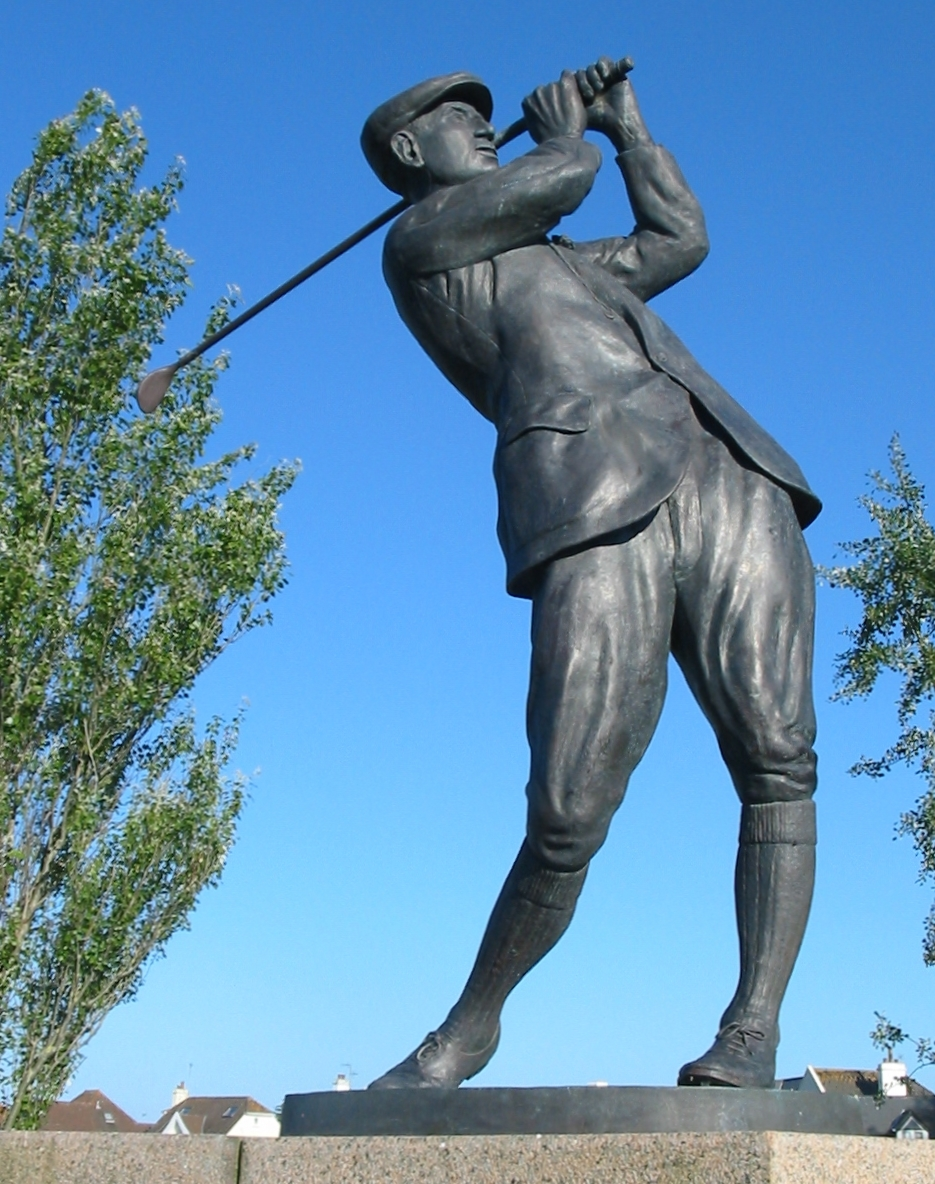
A statue of Jersey golfer, Harry Vardon, stands at the entrance to the Royal Jersey Golf Club.

In its own right, Jersey participates in the Commonwealth Games and in the biennial Island Games, which it first hosted in 1997 and more recently in 2015.

The Jersey Football Association supervises football in Jersey. As of 2022, the Jersey Football Combination has nine teams in its top division. Jersey national football team plays in the annual Muratti competition against the other Channel Islands. Rugby union in Jersey comes under the auspices of the Jersey Rugby Association (JRA), which is a member of the Rugby Football Union of England. Amateur side, Jersey RFC, won the English Regional Two South Central Division in the 2023/24 season and will play in fifth tier Regional One South Central next campaign.

Jersey Cricket Board is the official governing body of the sport of cricket in Jersey. Jersey Cricket Board is Jersey's representative at the International Cricket Council (ICC). It has been an ICC member since 2005 and an associate member since 2007. The Jersey cricket team plays in the Inter-insular match, as well as in ICC tournaments around the world in One Day Internationals and Twenty20 Internationals.

For horse racing, Les Landes Racecourse can be found at Les Landes in St. Ouen next to the ruins of Grosnez Castle.

Jersey has two public indoor swimming pools: AquaSplash, St Helier and Les Quennevais, St Brelade. Swimming in the sea, windsurfing and other marine sports are practised. Jersey Swimming Club has organised an annual swim from Elizabeth Castle to Saint Helier Harbour for over 50 years. A round-island swim is a major challenge: the record for the swim is Ross Wisby, who circumnavigated the island in 9 hours 26 minutes in 2015. The Royal Channel Island Yacht Club is based in St Brelade.

Two professional golfers from Jersey have won the Open Championship seven times between them; Harry Vardon won six times and Ted Ray won once, both around the turn of the 20th century. Vardon and Ray also won the U.S. Open once each. Harry Vardon's brother, Tom Vardon, had wins on various European tours.

Jersey Sport, an independent body that promotes sports in Jersey and support clubs, was launched in 2017.

=== Languages ===
Until the 19th century, indigenous Jèrriais – a variety of Norman – was the language of the island though French was used for official business. During the 20th century, British cultural influence saw an intense language shift take place and Jersey today is predominantly English-speaking. Jèrriais nonetheless survives; around 2,600 islanders (3%) are thought to be habitual speakers, and some 10,000 (12%) in all claim some knowledge of the language, particularly among the elderly in rural parishes. There have been efforts to revive Jèrriais in schools.

The dialects of Jèrriais differ in phonology and, to a lesser extent, lexis between parishes, with the most marked differences to be heard between those of the west and east. Many place names are in Jèrriais, and French and English place names are also to be found. Anglicisation of the place names increased apace with the migration of English people to the island.

=== Literature ===
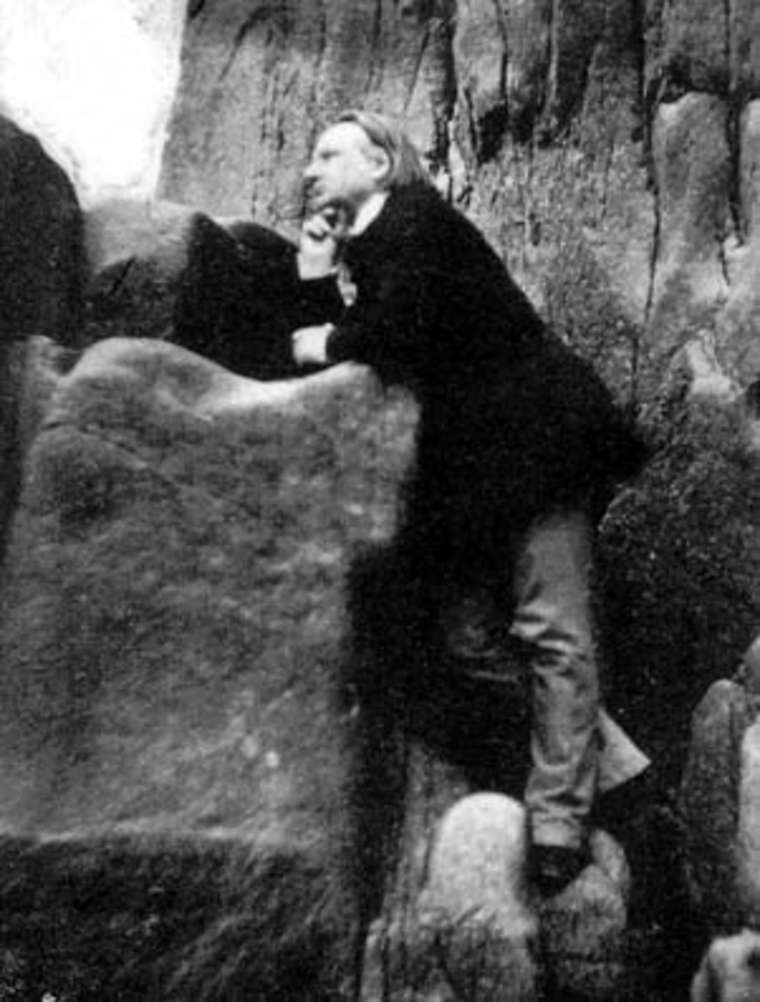
Victor Hugo in exile, 1850s

Wace was a 12th-century poet born in Jersey. He is the earliest known Jersey writer, authoring Roman de Brut and Roman de Rou, among others. Some believe him to be the earliest Jèrriais writer and he is known as the founder of Jersey literature, but the language in which he wrote is very different from modern Jèrriais.

As Jèrriais was not an official language in Jersey, it had no standard written form, which meant that Jersey literature is very varied, written in multiple forms of Jèrriais alongside Standard English and French.

Matthew Le Geyt was the first poet to publish in Jèrriais after the introduction of printing to the island in the 18th century. Philippe Le Sueur Mourant wrote in Jèrriais in the 19th century. Jerseyman George d'la Forge is named the 'Guardian of the Jersey Norman Heritage'. Though he lived in America for most of his life, he felt a strong attachment to Jersey and his native language. His works were turned into books in the 1980s.

After the failure of the 1848 revolution, thirty-nine French revolutionaries were exiled in Jersey, including the famous French author Victor Hugo, as Jersey's culture had a relation to their native French. Gerald Durrell, the famous zoologist who set up Jersey Zoo, was also an author, writing novels, non-fiction and children's books. He wrote in order to fund and further his conservation work.

== Education ==
Education in the island is managed by the Department for Children, Young People, Education and Skills of the Government of Jersey. The education system in Jersey is based on the English system. Full time education is compulsory for children aged 5 to 16. The Government provides limited free pre-school education to parents. Jersey schools must teach the Jersey Curriculum, which is based on the English National Curriculum, with differences to account for Jersey's unique position.

As of 2022, there are 24 States primary schools, seven private primary or preparatory schools, four comprehensive States secondary schools, two fee-paying States secondary schools, two private secondary schools and one provided grammar school and sixth form, Hautlieu School. Highlands College provides alternative post-16 and all post-18 education available on the island. However, higher education facilities are limited, so many students study off-island. In the UK, Jersey students pay the same rate as Home students.

== Environment ==
=== Environmental protection ===
Designations

Ramsar Wetland
- Official name: South East Coast of Jersey, Channel Islands
- Designated: 10 November 2000
- Reference no.: 1043

Three areas of land are protected for their ecological or geological interest as Sites of Special Interest (SSI). Jersey has four designated Ramsar sites: Les Pierres de Lecq, Les Minquiers, Les Écréhous and Les Dirouilles and the south east coast of Jersey (a large area of intertidal zone).

==== Land use planning ====
Jersey operates a planning system based on the discretionary system in use in the UK, where the States of Jersey passes a development plan, known as the Island Plan, which sets out zoning, development policies and sites allocated for development. Planning is regulated by the Island Planning Law 1964.

==== Geopark bid ====
The Aspiring Jersey Island Geopark (AJIG) project is a local campaign supported by the Government of Jersey and Jersey Heritage to achieve geopark status for the island of Jersey. The campaign intends to submit an application to UNESCO to designate the island as a Global Geopark. As part of this, Jersey Heritage launched a call for islanders to nominate sites of natural and cultural significance for individual nomination for geopark status.

=== Biodiversity ===
Four species of small mammal are considered native: the wood mouse, bank vole (an endemic subspecies Clethrionomys glareolus caesarius), lesser white-toothed shrew and crowned shrew. Three wild mammals are well-established introductions: the rabbit (introduced in the Middle Ages), red squirrel and hedgehog (both introduced in the 19th century). The stoat became extinct in Jersey between 1976 and 2000, and may have been outcompeted by feral ferrets which probably became established on the island in the 1960s.

The red-billed chough became extinct in Jersey around 1900, when changes in farming and grazing practices led to a decline in the coastal slope habitat required by this species. Birds on the Edge, a project between the Government of Jersey, Durrell Wildlife Conservation Trust and National Trust for Jersey, is working to restore Jersey's coastal habitats and reinstate the red-billed chough (and other bird species) to the island.

Four species of reptiles occur on Jersey: the western green lizard, wall lizard, slow worm, and barred grass snake. There are three species of amphibians: the spiny toad (known locally as the Crapaud), agile frog, and palmate newt. All are protected species, with Jersey being the only native habitat in the British Isles for the green lizard, wall lizard, spiny toad and agile frog.

The remaining population of agile frogs on Jersey is very small and is restricted to the south west of the island. The species is the subject of an ongoing programme to save it from extinction in Jersey via a collaboration between the Government of Jersey, Durrell Wildlife Conservation Trust and Jersey Amphibian and Reptile Group (JARG), with support and sponsorship from several other organisations. The programme includes captive breeding and release, public awareness and habitat restoration activities.

Notable marine species include the ormer, conger, bass, undulate ray, grey mullet, ballan wrasse and garfish. Marine mammals include the bottlenosed dolphin and grey seal.

Trees generally considered native are the alder, silver birch, sweet chestnut, hazel, hawthorn, beech, ash, aspen, wild cherry, blackthorn, holm oak, pedunculate oak, sallow, elder, elm and medlar. Among notable introduced species, the cabbage palm has been planted in coastal areas and may be seen in many gardens.

Historically the island has given its name to a variety of overly-large cabbage, the Jersey cabbage, also known as Jersey kale or cow cabbage.

Japanese knotweed is an invasive species that threatens Jersey's biodiversity. It is easily recognisable and has hollow stems with small white flowers that are produced in late summer. Other non-native species on the island include the Colorado beetle, burnet rose and oak processionary moth.

==== Zoological park ====
Jersey is the home of the Jersey Zoo (formerly known as the Durrell Wildlife Park) founded by the naturalist, zookeeper and author Gerald Durrell.

== Public services ==
=== Healthcare ===
Health services on the island are overseen by the Department for Health and Social Care. Jersey does not have a nationalised health service and the service is not part of the National Health Service. Many healthcare treatments are not free at the point of use; however, treatment in the accident and emergency department is free. For residents, prescriptions and some hospital treatments are free, but GP services are paid for.

=== Emergency services ===
Emergency services are provided by the States of Jersey Police with the support of the Honorary Police as necessary, States of Jersey Ambulance Service, Jersey Fire and Rescue Service and the Jersey Coastguard. The Jersey Fire and Rescue Service, Jersey Lifeboat Association and the Royal National Lifeboat Institution operate an inshore rescue and lifeboat service; Channel Islands Air Search provides rapid response airborne search of the surrounding waters.

The States of Jersey Fire Service was formed in 1938 when the States took over the Saint Helier Fire Brigade, which had been formed in 1901. The first lifeboat was equipped, funded by the States, in 1830. The RNLI established a lifeboat station in 1884. Border security and customs controls are undertaken by the States of Jersey Customs and Immigration Service. Jersey has adopted the 112 emergency number alongside its existing 999 emergency number.

=== Supply services ===
Water supplies in Jersey are managed by Jersey Water. Jersey Water supply water from two water treatment works, around 7.2 billion litres in 2018. Water in Jersey is almost exclusively from rainfall-dependent surface water. The water is collected and stored in six reservoirs and there is also a desalination plant that produces up to 10.8 million litres per day (around half of the Island's average daily usage). In 2017, 101 water pollution incidents were reported, an increase of 5% on 2016. Another estimated 515,700 m^{3} of water is abstracted for domestic purposes from private sources (around 9% of the population).

Electricity in Jersey is provided by a sole supplier, Jersey Electricity, of which the States of Jersey is the majority shareholder. Jersey imports 95 per cent of its power from France. 35% of the imported power derives from hydro-electric sources and 65% from nuclear sources. Jersey Electricity claims the carbon intensity of its electricity supply is 35g CO_{2} e / kWh compared to 352g CO_{2} e / kWh in the UK.

== See also ==
- Bibliography of Jersey
- Geology of Jersey
- Jersey Post
- Haut de la Garenne
- Outline of Jersey
- Royal Militia of the Island of Jersey
- List of tallest buildings and structures in Jersey
