= List of tallest buildings and structures in Jersey =

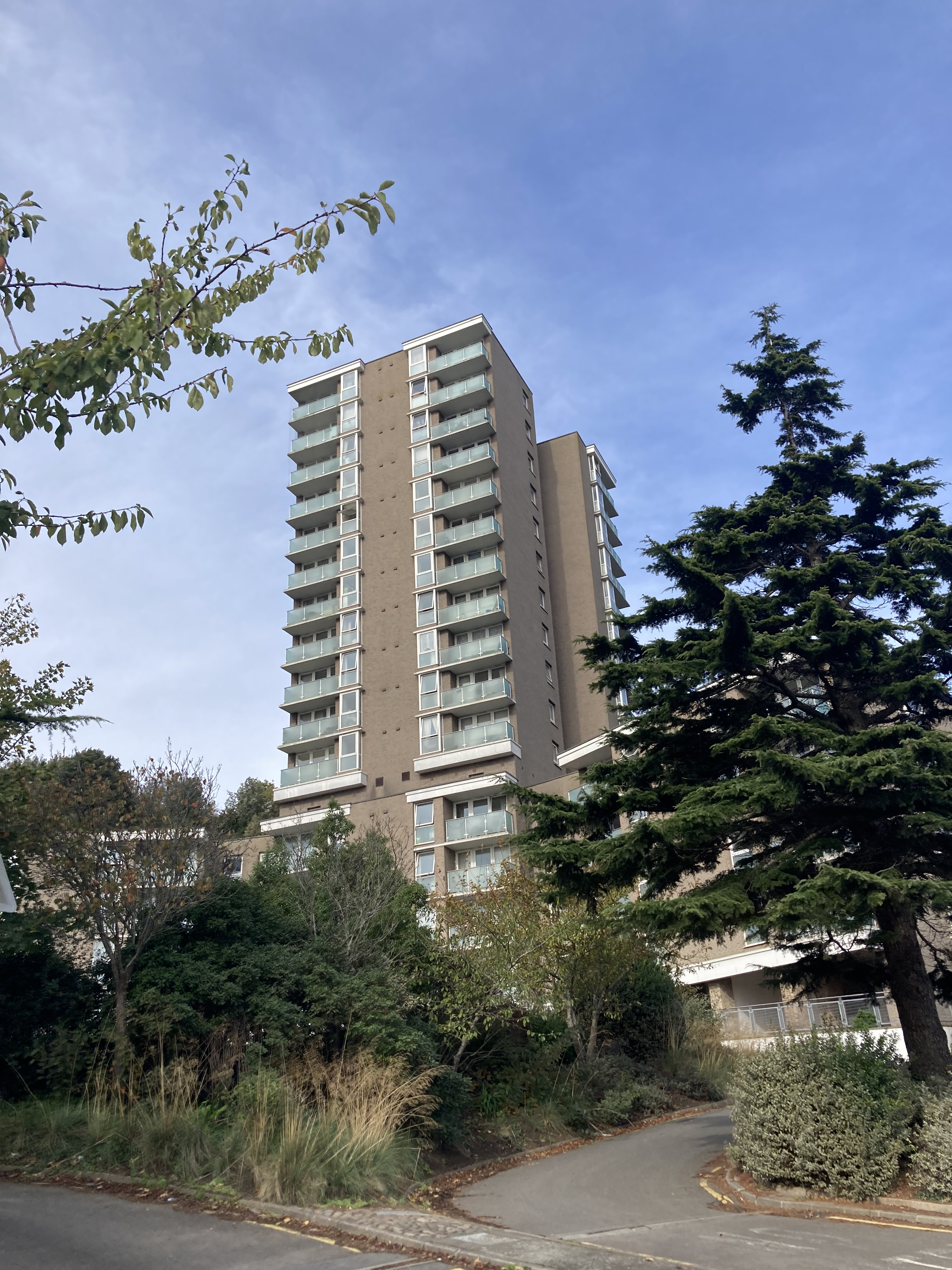
The Cedars, built in 1972, is the tallest inhabitable building on the island standing at 48 metres (157 ft)

This list of the tallest buildings and structures in Jersey ranks buildings and structures in Bailiwick of Jersey. Only structures taller than 98 feet (30 m) are listed.

The Island's tallest structure is the 139 metres (456 ft) Fremont Point transmitting station. The tallest inhabitable structure is the 157.5 feet (48.0 m) The Cedars. This list excludes the many churches scattered across the island except St Thomas Church.

== Brief history ==
In 1883 work started on St Thomas Church in St Helier, upon its completion in 1887, it was the tallest structure in the Channel Islands, standing at 197 ft (60m). It stayed that way until La Collette Chimney was constructed in 1966. It stands at 348ft (106m) and has been the tallest structure in Jersey ever since.

In 1963, the first high-rise building was constructed, with the La Collette High-Rise. Later in the 1970s many more high-rise buildings were built, especially in 1972 when the De Quetteville Court, the Le Marais blocks and The Cedars were built. The Cedars is the tallest inhabitable building on the Island. Ever since then, many more high-rise buildings were built, but quite a few under 30 metres (98 ft), so are not on this list.

As of November 2025 there are 25 buildings/structures in Jersey over 30 meters tall with two more under construction or approved.

== Tallest buildings and structures ==
An equal sign (=) following a rank indicates the same height between two or more buildings.

Rank	Name	Use	Image	Height (m)	Height (ft)	Floors	Year	Notes
1	Fremont Point transmitting station	FM radio and television transmission		139	456	N/A	1962	
2	La Collette Chimney	Chimney		106	348	N/A	1966	
3	St. Thomas Church	Church		60	197	N/A	1887	
4	The Cedars	Residential		48	157.5	16	1972	
5=	Le Marais Block E	Residential		44	144.3	14	1972	
5=	Le Marais Block F	Residential		44	144.3	14	1972	
5=	Le Marais Block G	Residential		44	144.3	14	1972	
5=	Le Marais Block H	Residential		44	144.3	14	1972	
9	La Collette	Residential		43	141	14	1963	
10	Plaisant Court	Residential		40	131	13	1976	
11	General Hospital	Hospital		39.6	130	8	1987	
12	Jersey Airport ATC Tower	ATC Tower		39.2	128	N/A	2010	
13	La Collette Waste Facility	Waste Facility		37	121	N/A	2011	
14	Horizon Block C	Residential		36.5	120	10	2023	
15=	Westmount Quarry Block B	Residential		33.5	110	10	2016	
15=	Westmount Quarry Block C	Residential		33.5	110	10	2016	
17	Horizon Block B	Residential		33.45	110	9	2023	
18=	Hue Court 1	Residential		33	108	10	1978	
18=	Hue Court 2	Residential		33	108	10	1978	
20	Union House	Office		32.3	106	9	1976	
21	Marina Court	Residential		31.5	103	10	1960s	
22	Cyril Le Marquand House	Office		31.9	104.5	7	2024	
23	Windsor Court	Residential		30.75	101	9	1976	
24	Horizon Block A	Residential		30.1	99	8	2023	
25	De Quetteville Court	Residential		30	98	9	1972	

== Tallest under construction, demolished, approved and proposed ==
Name	Use	Image	Height (m)	Height (ft)	Floors	Notes
Bellozanne Chimney	Chimney		100	328	N/A	Constructed in the 1970s, later demolished in 2014
The Gateway Building	Residential		≈50	≈164	16	Originally proposed as part of the new waterfront development but later withdrawn.
Cyril Le Marquand House	Office		42.8	140	9	Demolished 2021/2022
Dumaresq Street Redevelopment	Residential		33	108	9	Approved in July 2024
IFC 2	Office		30.3	99	7	Planning Approved, Tallest of the IFC buildings.
