= 2021 Jersey dispute =

Dispute over fishing licences

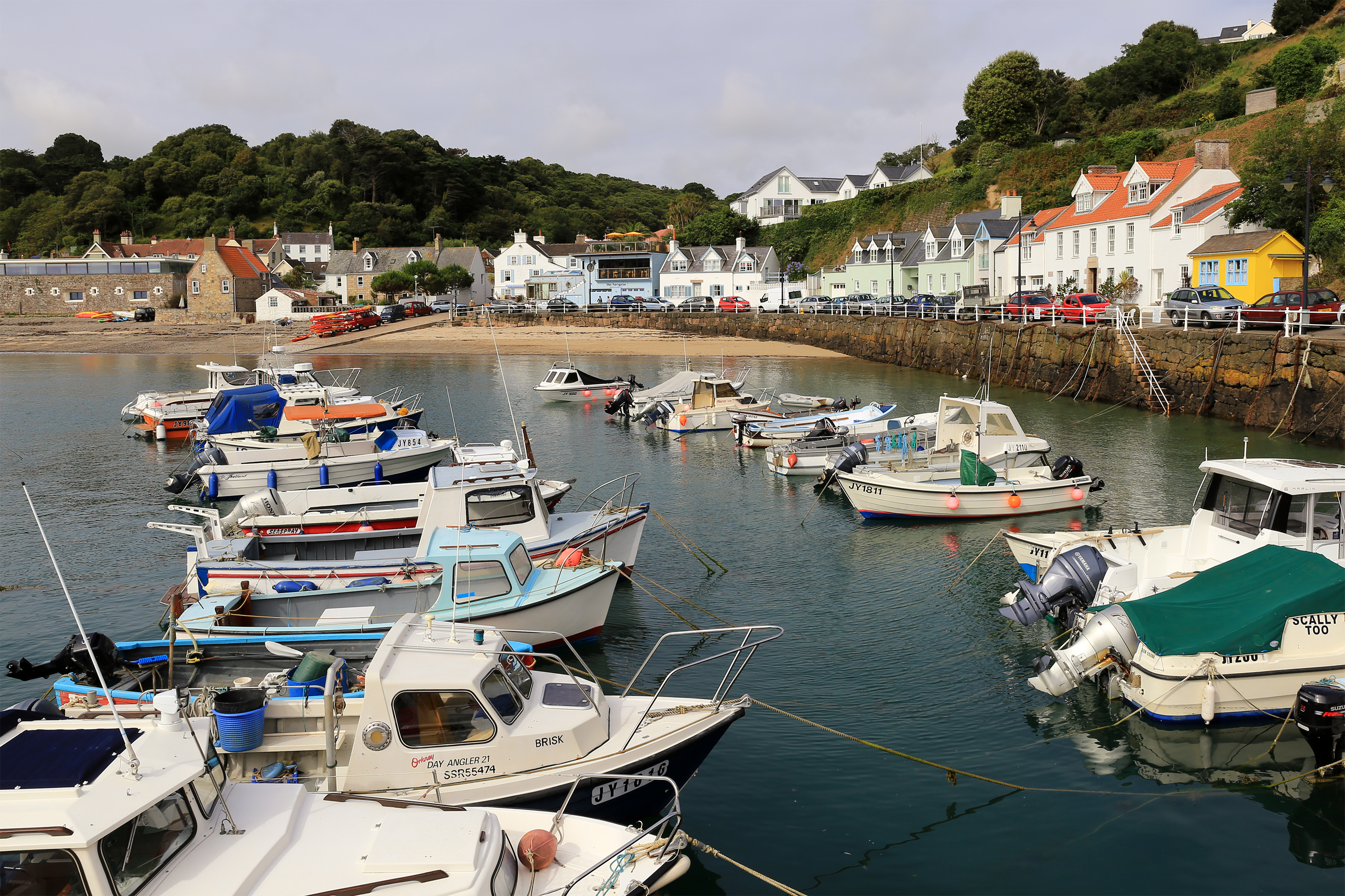
Small fishing boats in the harbour of Rozel on Jersey's north east coast

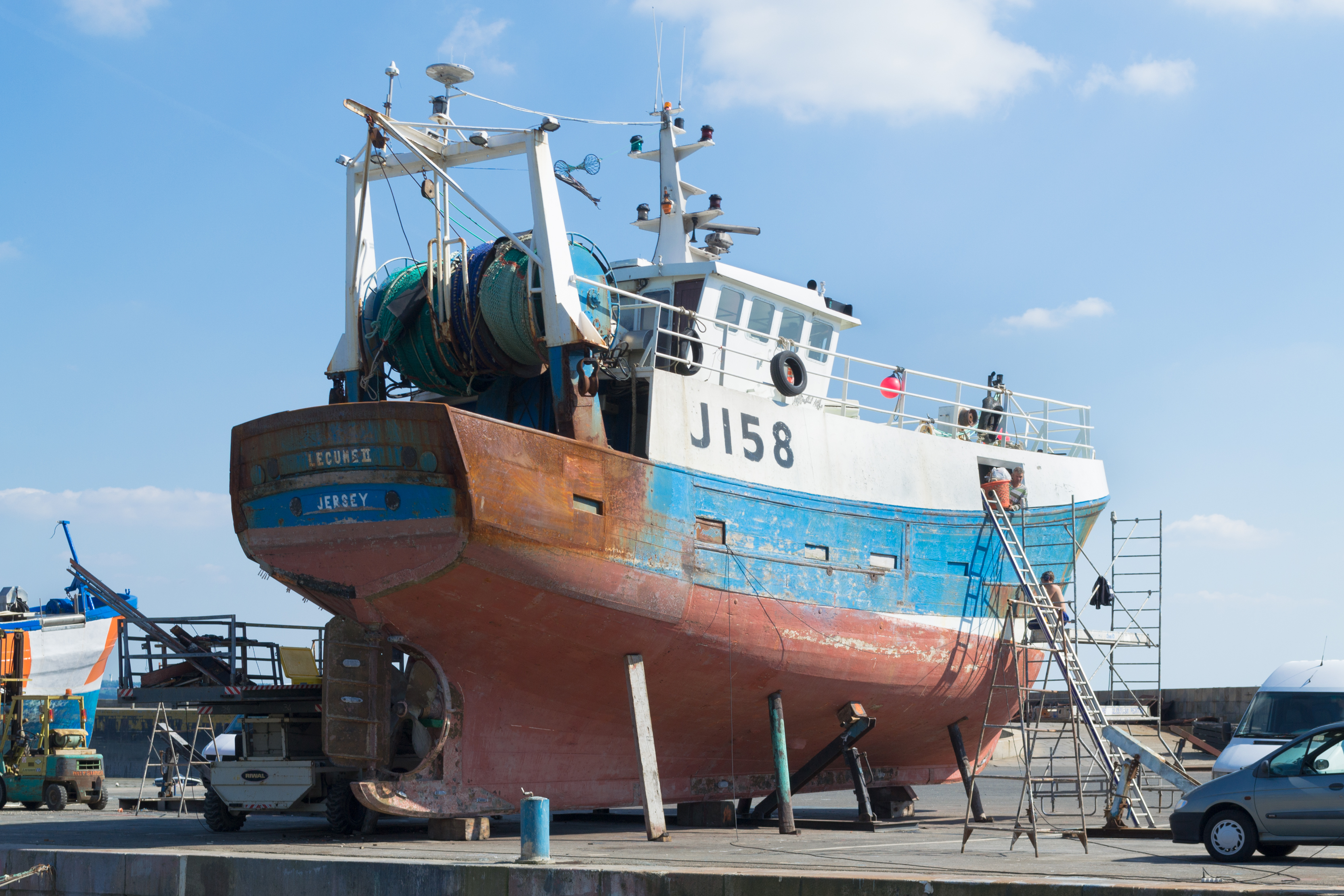
A 17-metre Jersey fishing trawler out of the water at Granville

In 2021, a dispute erupted between French fishermen and the Government of Jersey about the licensing of French fishing boats to fish in Jersey's territorial waters. Jersey is a British Crown Dependency, and despite not being part of the United Kingdom, the licensing of European Union fishing boats to fish in Jersey's territorial waters has changed after the UK exit from the EU. On 6 May 2021, French fishermen held a protest in the waters off Jersey's main harbour. The UK is responsible for the defence of the Channel Islands and sent two patrol boats to Jersey in response to the fishermen's threats to blockade it. French politicians suggested that Jersey's electricity supply fed by undersea cables from France could be cut off in retaliation for Jersey placing limitations on the extent to which French boats can fish in the island's waters.

As of March 2022, 131 boats had received permanent licences. Jersey considered the dispute to remain a live issue and were awaiting any formal complaint that France may lodge with the European Commission. The Jersey government continued to hold off enforcing some of the conditions of the French fishermen's licences, but intended to revisit them.

== Background ==
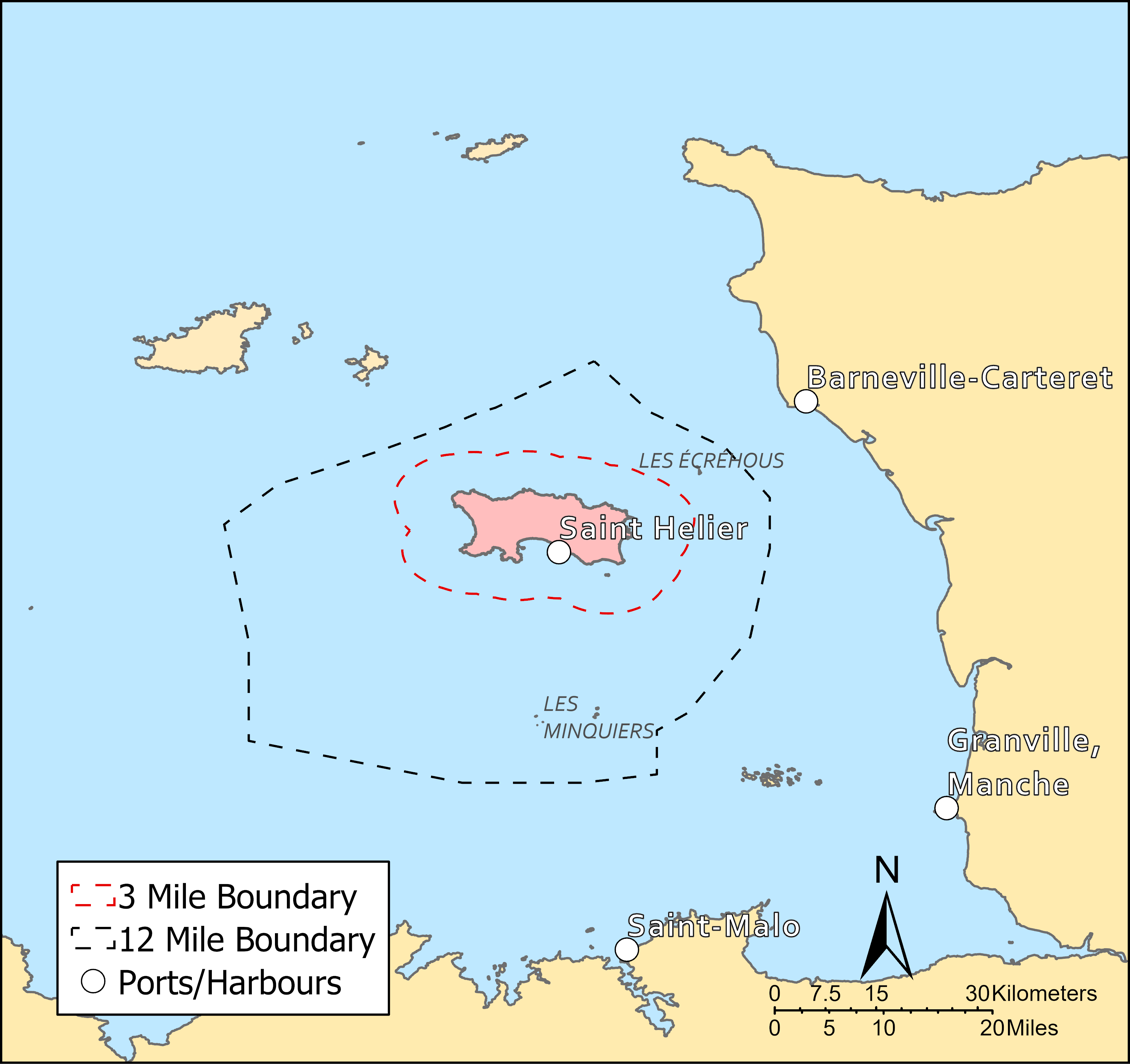
Jersey, its offshore reefs and territorial waters, and the adjacent coasts of France

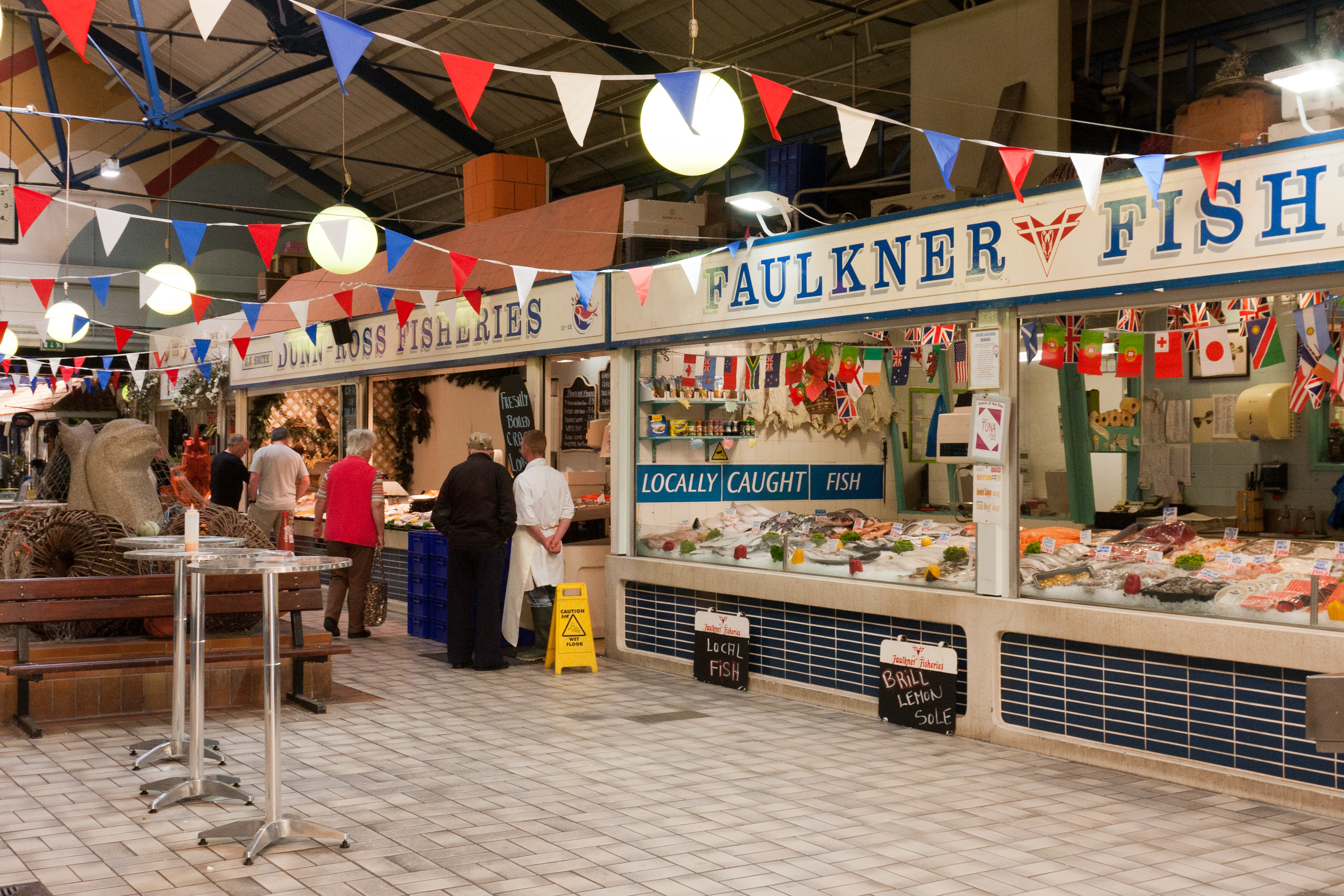
Jersey's fish market

Jersey is a Crown Dependency. Although the island was never part of the UK nor EU, in 1996 it signed a fisheries management agreement with the UK that enabled the Jersey fleet's catch to be treated 'as if from the UK' and required it to comply with the UK's EU obligations under the EU's Common Fisheries Policy for Jersey's extended territorial sea.

Two-thirds of the shellfish consumed in France comes from the Normandy fishing fleet, supporting 4,000 jobs. The fishing grounds surrounding Jersey are rich and diverse, with species including whelk, brown crab, cuttlefish, lobster, spider crab, scallop, clam, sole, ray and sea bream. French fishermen like to fish in Jersey's waters because they are wider and deeper, which often leads to catching bigger produce. Jersey boats seldom fish in French waters.

=== Normal relations between Jersey and the neighbouring French coastal towns ===
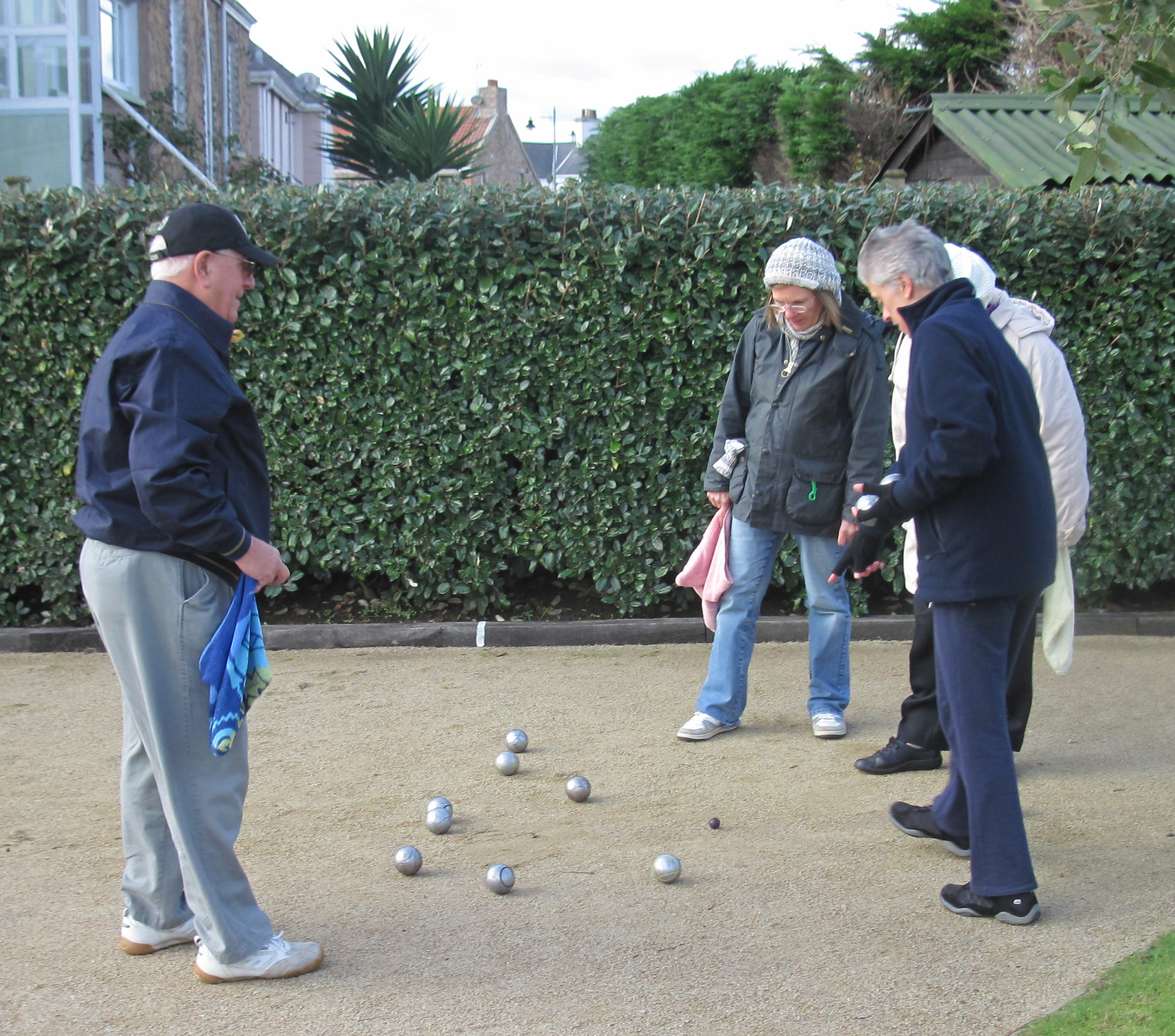
The game of pétanque is played between Jersey and Norman teams.

Jersey has historically enjoyed a cordial relationship with its Norman and Breton neighbours. Jersey was part of the Duchy of Normandy until 1204. The port of Barneville-Carteret is only 24 nautical miles (28 mi; 44 km) from Jersey's capital Saint Helier, and the larger ports of Granville and Saint-Malo are 30 nautical miles (35 mi; 56 km) and 35 nautical miles (40 mi; 65 km) away respectively. There is a passenger ferry service from the Norman ports to Saint Helier, and a fast ferry carrying foot passengers and vehicles to Saint Malo. The marinas in the four ports are popular destinations for recreational boat owners. Eleven of the twelve parishes of Jersey are twinned with towns in Normandy, and the game of pétanque is played competitively between teams on the island and those of Norman towns. Jersey and Guernsey share the Bureau des Îles Anglo-Normandes – a representative office in Caen, the capital of Normandy, and the departmental council of Manche and the regional council of Normandy shares an equivalent office in Jersey – the Maison de la Normandie et de la Manche – which is also the office of the French honorary consul.

Since 1985, Jersey has imported low-cost, low-carbon electricity from Normandy through undersea cables that form the Channel Islands Electricity Grid. Jersey retains the ability to generate all its own electricity but the Jersey Electricity Company only does so in the event of a failure of the French link which provides 95% of the island's power.

Speaking in the French Senate on 5 May 2021, Sénatrice Béatrice Gosselin said "I can see Jersey chimneys from home, we all are 'anglo-normands' ... Our lives are linked to each other, it's been the case for centuries. We have to take those very particular conditions into account, the life between Jersey and the Manche coast has always existed and we need to put that at the forefront and work hard to find solutions that are fair for everyone."

=== Granville Bay agreement ===
Historically, Jersey controlled its territorial waters up to 3 nautical miles (3.5 mi; 5.6 km) from its coast and around the Minquiers and Écréhous reefs which are part of the Bailiwick of Jersey. The area between Jersey and France's coastal waters was common sea, not belonging to or controlled by anyone.

In 1839 the first treaty on fishing in waters between Jersey and France was made, limited to regulating oyster farming. Slight amendments were made in 1920 and again in 1951 when the words 'oyster fishing' were omitted to widen the scope of the agreement, effectively giving French fishermen the right to fish up to three miles off Jersey's coast without restrictions or controls. By 1981 the growth in fishing and reducing stocks meant it was inadequate for modern fishing practices. From 1992 until 2000, Jersey Senator Pierre Horsfall negotiated a new agreement with his French counterparts. The Agreement Between The United Kingdom of Great Britain and Northern Ireland and The French Republic Concerning Fishing In The Bay of Granville was signed on 4 July 2000 by Michael Wilkes, Lieutenant Governor of Jersey on behalf of the Crown and Daniel Bernard, French ambassador on behalf of France, but its implementation would require changes to the legislation in both Jersey and France. It came into force on 1 January 2004, giving Jersey and France shared responsibility for the management of fishing in the area between 3 and 12 nautical miles (3.5 and 13.8 mi; 5.6 and 22.2 km) off Jersey's coast under terms of the agreement. As of February 2020, 392 French boats had active permits to fish under the terms of the agreement, 67 of which actively use Jersey's waters to fish.

Provisions of the agreement included:

- Vessels require a permit to fish commercially in the area
- A joint management committee composed of officials from France and Jersey would issue the permits and in doing so control the level of fishing effort in the area such as by increasing or reducing the number and size of boats, the type of fishing gear used and the level of catch allowed
- A joint advisory committee would represent the fishermen on both sides, giving them a forum to resolve disputes and enabling to engage with the government officials and scientists.

After the UK left the EU on 31 January 2020 there was a transition period of one year where EU law continued to apply to the UK. At the end of this period the Bay of Granville Agreement no longer had effect and Jersey's fishing relationship with France changed to be governed by the EU–UK Trade and Cooperation Agreement. Under the new agreement Jersey must allow licensed European vessels that have historically fished in its territorial waters to continue to do so. According to newspaper Ouest-France, French fishermen were wary of the changes and were considering ways to retaliate if their fishing rights were curtailed, including "'blackmail' in landing fish, to energy – since submarine cables supply the islands from Normandy – or in freight or customs duties".

=== Trade agreement ===
The EU–UK Trade and Cooperation Agreement (TCA) was signed by the EU and UK on 30 December 2020 after nearly ten months of trade negotiations. Three days earlier, Jersey formally agreed to be included in the deal, ensuring that it could continue to trade with Europe without tariffs. Its parliament – the States of Jersey – were given until the end of March to properly scrutinise the detail of the agreement. Once ratified, Jersey took sole responsibility for managing its territorial waters. Any restrictions it places on fishing must apply equally to Jersey and EU boats.

The TCA initially only provisionally applied until it formally came into force on 1 May 2021 after the UK and EU ratified the agreement.

== Fishing permits ==
When Jersey's Environment Minister John Young announced that Jersey would be taking full control of its territorial waters in December 2020, he expressed hope that a new system would better ensure the ecological conservation of fishing stocks in the Island's waters. On 14 February 2020, 100 Jersey fishermen and supporters staged a protest in St Helier for action to be taken against overfishing. The president of the Jersey Fishermen's Association stated during the protest that "It's all about the marine environment and taking care of it and looking after it for future generations."

The TCA says that "each Party shall grant vessels of the other Party access to fish in its waters reflecting the actual extent and nature of fishing activity that it can be demonstrated was carried out during the period beginning on 1 February 2017 and ending on 31 January 2020 by qualifying vessels of the other Party in the waters and under any treaty arrangements that existed on 31 January 2020."

On 25 January 2021 the Government of Jersey and EU Commissioner for Environment, Oceans and Fisheries Virginijus Sinkevičius agreed to formalise the amnesty period that Jersey had introduced, allowing French boats over 12 metres (39 ft) long to continue to fish until the end of April 2021. This was intended to enable EU fishermen to gather and submit the necessary evidence of their historic fishing activities in Jersey waters.

On 23 April 2021 Jersey implemented the provisions of the TCA in its domestic legislation through amendments to the Sea Fisheries (Jersey) Law 1994 and Sea Fisheries (Licensing of Fishing Boats) (Jersey) Regulations 2003, which defined the process for licensing of fishing boats operating in its waters.

The change means that Jersey now controls fishing activities for EU boats in Jersey waters which is of concern especially to French fishermen. According to the Normandy and Brittany fishers' federations it affects 250 of their fishing boats, about 900 families and 2,000 jobs on land.

The new permit system came into force for vessels over 12 metres (39 ft) long equipped with vessel monitoring systems (VMS) at the end of the amnesty period on 30 April 2021, and the Government of Jersey issued 41 permits, with a further 14 pending as of that date, out of 344 requests. When the fishermen received their licences via email there was surprise that they came with conditions, some of which were specific to their boat, including:

- how many days a boat may fish in Jersey waters, ranging from 7 to 170 days per year
- what species they may target
- what fishing gear can be used, and how dredging can be done
- temporary exclusion from sea bream spawning grounds to enable scientific research to take place

However, Jersey later suspended these extra conditions and also allowed for additional types of positional data to be accepted as evidence of historical fishing in addition to VMS such as AIS, logbooks, chart plotters and other written information, as well as GPS.

Young clarified that the fishing licensing scheme will allow Jersey to monitor and control an environmentally sustainable level of fishing in Jersey's territorial waters. Young further stated that; "Our fishing has been unsustainable because of overfishing in the past and I've been clear about that and there will need to be conservation measures. What we've got is a framework of licensing that creates a fair way of doing it, so both ourselves and the EU nations can have sustainable fishing."

On 29 September 2021, the Jersey government issued a total of 142 fishing permits, but stated they had rejected permits for 75 French vessel citing that they "do not meet the criteria and have either not fished in Jersey waters during the relevant period or have not been able to evidence their activity". In reciprocity, Jersey boats that have traditionally fished in French waters are expected to be given a permit to continue by the French authorities. As of 28 June 2021 only three Jersey fishing boats had applied for such a permit. A similar licensing regime exists for Jersey boats that wanted to continue to fish in Guernsey’s territorial waters. When that was introduced, only 18 of the 165 boats in Jersey's fishing fleet were granted licences, having provided sufficient proof of a track record of fishing in the area controlled by Guernsey.

The temporary licences expired on 1 February 2022, with 130 vessels permanently licensed. Young said that the island now intended to focus on the 'nature' and 'extent' clauses which were intended to limit how many days the boats could fish in Jersey waters, the species they could catch and the equipment they could use. Around 30 boats that had been given temporary licences would no longer be able to fish in Jersey waters, having not produced the evidence required. By 9 March 2022, one more boat had received a permanent licence, bringing the total to 131.

== Dispute ==
In February 2021, Jersey fishermen protested over their concerns that French fishing boats were exploiting the amnesty period by overfishing in Jersey's waters. Further concerns were raised in April that French fishing trawlers were using unsustainable fishing methods such as dredging during the amnesty period. Young accused French trawlers of "breaking the spirit of the amnesty" and that due to recent dredging by French trawlers that Jersey's marine ecology "won't take this for much longer and, if it goes on, we will have to close the area off for years".

The TCA says that "each Party shall notify the other Party of new measures as referred to in paragraph 1 that are likely to affect the vessels of the other Party before those measures are applied, allowing sufficient time for the other Party to provide comments or seek clarification." The French government said that these conditions had not been discussed previously and therefore had no effect. It complained at how the system had been implemented, calling the new rules "completely unacceptable" as they dictate where ships can and cannot go.

Jersey may not have received the information that the French fishermen provided to evidence their historic fishing activity in Jersey's waters. When a French fishing boat applies for a licence, the request is submitted by the French local authorities to the EU who forward it to the United Kingdom Single Issuing Authority (UKSIA) who forward it to Jersey. In an interview with France Bleu, Jersey politician Deputy Gregory Guida, a Frenchman by nationality, said "what we received was of very poor quality. The French administration sent us horrors: missing or duplicated documents of boats with just the minimum 10 days to issue licences without additional information to determine the importance of their annual activity in our waters." Normandy politician Sénatrice Gosselin told the fishermen that the missing documents may have been lost somewhere between the committee that checks that the information is complete, the Direction des pêches maritimes et de l'aquaculture (DPMA), the Minister of the Sea and Brussels. The Normandy Regional Fisheries Committee (CRPMEM) called her comments "irresponsible" and described the situation as "formidably complex".

French fishermen may have believed it was sufficient to produce evidence of ten days of fishing to receive a permit for the whole year, while in fact they needed to produce a minimum of ten days of evidence, plus evidence for the most days per year they had fished in the island's waters in the past three years.

=== 6 May protest ===
Norman and Breton fishermen met in Granville on 3 May, with some intent on blockading the port of Saint Helier on 6 May in protest at the system.

In the evening of the 5 May, UK Prime Minister Boris Johnson said "any blockade would be completely unjustified" and announced that the Royal Navy would send two patrol vessels to monitor the waters around Jersey as a precautionary measure. He also held meetings with Senator John Le Fondré, the Chief Minister of Jersey and Senator Ian Gorst, the island's Minister of External Relations, telling them of the need for a "de-escalation in tensions".

On 6 May, HMS Severn and HMS Tamar arrived off the south coast of Jersey where they maintained a presence and monitored the situation from a distance, but did not intervene. Later two French patrol boats, Athos and Thémis began patrolling just outside of the twelve nautical miles (22 km; 14 mi) limit, remaining in French waters.

Between 50 and 60 French fishing boats including trawlers and smaller craft entered the Saint Helier Harbour area, remaining outside the pierheads and for a time obstructing the freight ferry MV Commodore Goodwill from leaving her berth. Some lit distress flares and others displayed banners. The fishermen communicated amongst themselves over marine VHF radio. They were joined by a Jersey oyster fisherman supportive of the French on his converted landing craft, the Normandy Trader. One of the French fishermen said that having just spent €3m on two new trawlers he could go bankrupt if not allowed to continue to fish in Jersey waters on the same basis as before.

A member of the Jersey Militia reenactment group was seen at Elizabeth Castle firing a musket towards the French boats. A French fishing boat was filmed appearing to ram one of the only Jersey boats in the vicinity of the protest – a speedboat driven by a local entrepreneur who is alleged to have taunted the Frenchmen. Jersey's harbourmaster later investigated the altercation, but no charges were brought.

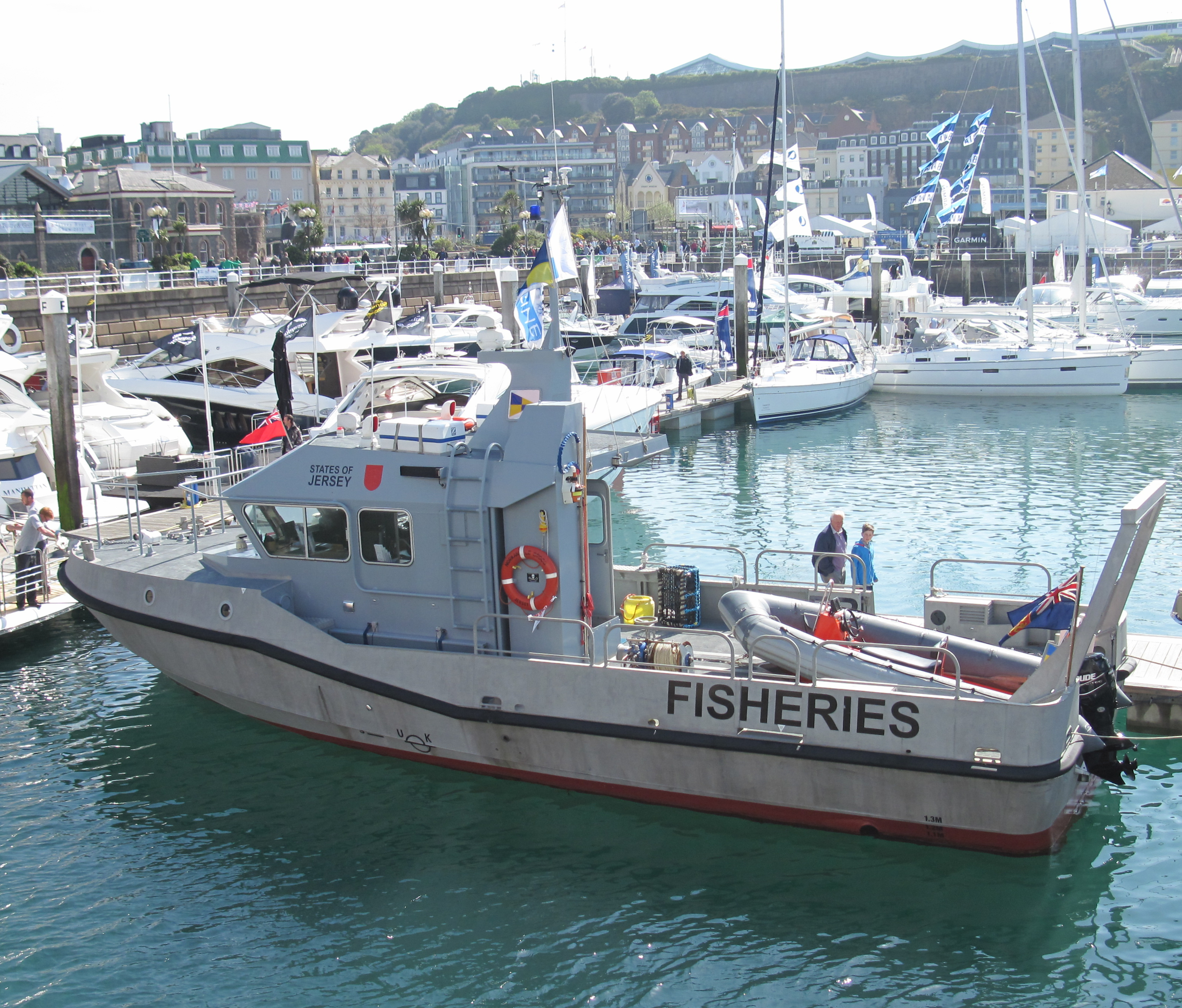
Jersey's fisheries protection vessel the Norman Le Brocq

At 11:40 am, two hours of discussions began in Saint Helier Harbour. In order to respect COVID-19 social distancing rules, Jersey officials aboard Jersey's fisheries protection vessel the Norman Le Brocq came alongside the Normandy Trader which had representatives of the French fishermen aboard. The lead representative from Jersey was its Assistant Minister for The Environment Deputy Guida — a fluent French speaker. Senator Gorst said the talks were positive, however a spokesman for Normandy fishermen said the talks put them "deeper into deadlock", and warned that retaliatory measures would be taken if this did not get resolved.

The protest ended at around 2 pm. Boris Johnson said the Royal Navy vessels would remain in place, but both ships left the area that evening. The protest was front-page news on most UK national newspapers whereas there was minimal coverage in France.

On 19 May, the French trawler Alizé 3 was intercepted illegally fishing in restricted bream breeding grounds. The trawler had been told by French authorities that French fishermen were allowed to fish wherever they wanted, despite the risk of breaking Jersey law. In August, another French trawler was accused of illegally fishing 1.2 tonnes of protected bluefin tuna in Jersey's territorial waters.

=== Closure of ports in Normandy to Jersey fishermen and freight ===
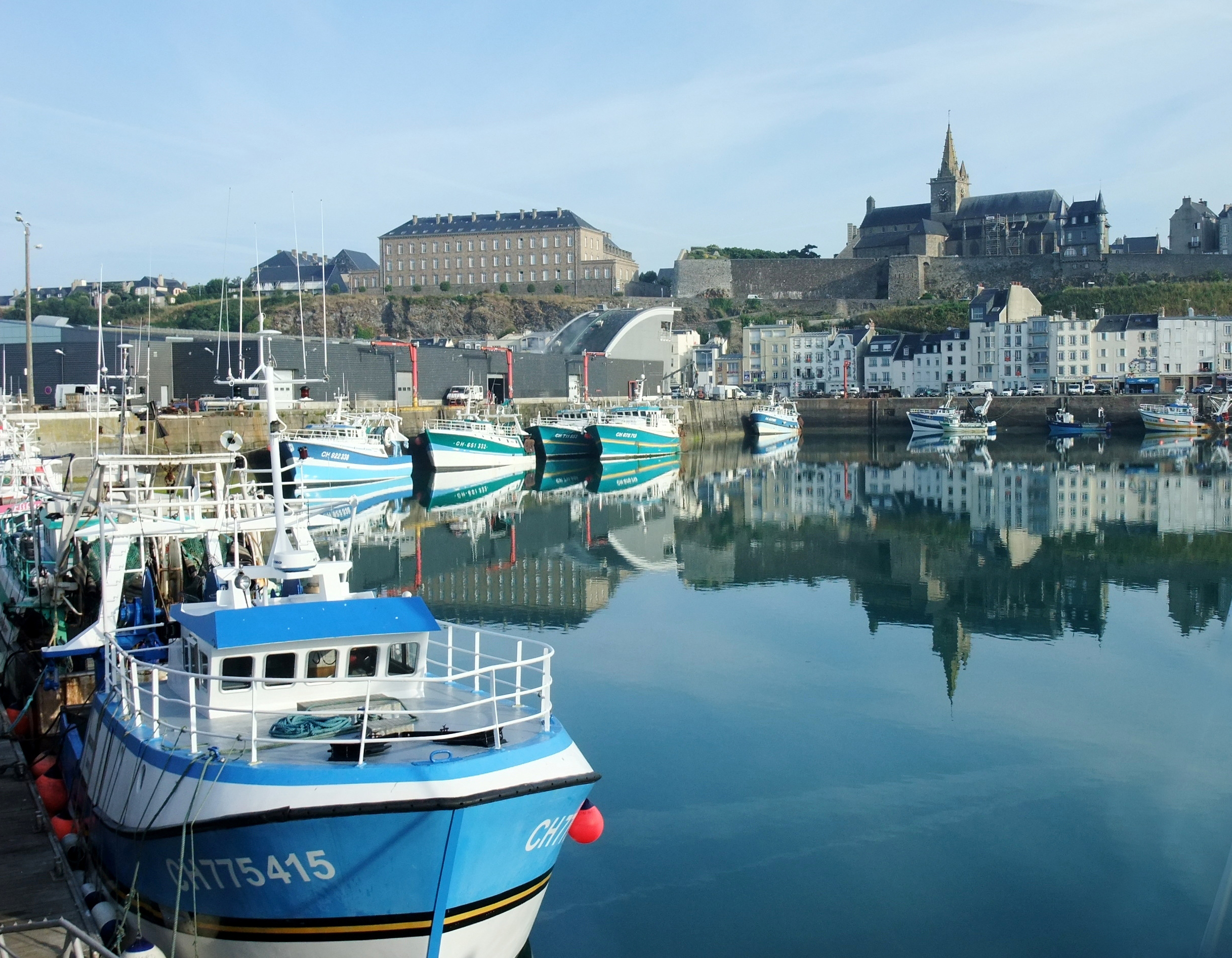
Some of the Granville fishing fleet in their home port

Jersey exports much of the fish that is caught locally by its own fishing fleet to France, landing it at the ports of Carteret, Granville or Saint Malo. Jersey boats registered with North East Atlantic Fisheries Commission can land crustaceans and fin fish they have caught, as these species are exempt from the EU sanitary and phytosanitary (SPS) requirements for an Export Health Certificate. However, specific French permission is required before each landing. Scallops, clams and whelks cannot be landed into the EU without a health certificate. On 10 March 2021, Jersey fishermen blocked the island's harbour to draw attention to being prevented from landing their catch in French harbours since Brexit. The day after the 6 May protest, a Jersey fishing boat was prevented from landing its catch of cuttlefish in Carteret by French fishermen who lined the quay.

On 7 May, the Manche government formally notified the Government of Jersey that it was suspending the landing of catches by Jersey boats in Granville, Carteret and Diélette until further notice. Jersey's government said it considered the ban to be non-compliant with the terms of the TCA and it would appeal to the European Commission. The ban was temporarily lifted on 10 May but was reinstated the following day and extended to prevent freight movements. Jersey businesses that regularly export fish to France were warned that even if the ports were officially open to Jersey exporters, local fishermen may obstruct them trying to offload their produce.

On 7 September, Jersey's Environment Minister told a scrutiny panel that work to rebuild relationships had led to better cooperation with the French, and the Government of Jersey was "not getting the complaints that [it] used to with landing, hostility, or anything of that nature anymore, that has gone away".

=== 18 September protest ===
At midday on 18 September, between 100 and 150 fishermen, their families and officials gathered on Armanville beach, Pirou to highlight the licensing issue and put pressure on the Jersey authorities. The beach is where Normandie 3, one of the three undersea electricity cables to Jersey is buried.

== Reactions ==
On 3 May, the Normandy region and the Manche department closed their combined offices in Jersey, which were set up in 1995, to protest their discontent and lack of understanding. The Maison de Normandie reopened on 1 July.

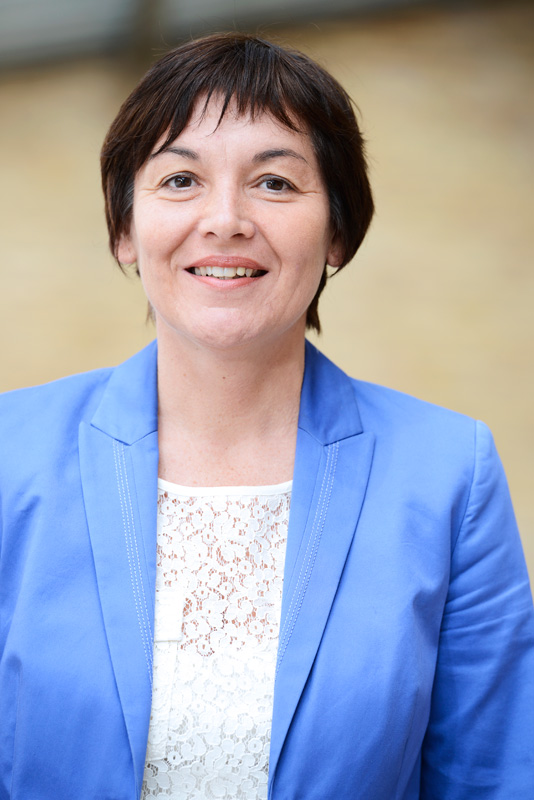
Annick Girardin, France's Minister of the Sea

On 5 May, the Maritime Minister Annick Girardin said France was "ready to use ... retaliatory measures" including cutting off the island's power supply from France. Former UK Secretary of State for Defence Penny Mordaunt wrote in a letter to the UK Secretary of State for Business, Energy and Industrial Strategy Kwasi Kwarteng that the proposed £1.2bn AQUIND Interconnector between Normandy and Portsmouth which would supply up to 5% of the UK's electricity needs should not proceed because of the risk that it would "become politicised and involved in any future discussions, in particular on fishing".

On the evening of the protest the UK Government issued a statement saying that under the Trade and Cooperation Agreement, Jersey authorities have a right to regulate fisheries in their waters and that they continue to support them in exercising those rights.

In the week after the protest, MEP Stéphanie Yon-Courtin suggested that the EU could apply economic sanctions by restricting agreements permitting Jersey to sell its financial services to EU citizens, and accused Jersey of being a tax haven. She said Jersey should withdraw from the TCA and revert to an agreement similar to the previous Granville Bay treaty that would provide more access to Jersey waters for French fishermen.

The European Commission spokesperson Vivian Loonela said UK was breaking the Brexit trade deal. The UK Secretary of State for Environment, Food and Rural Affairs George Eustice called the threat to shut down electricity to Jersey "disproportionate and unacceptable".

== Related disputes ==
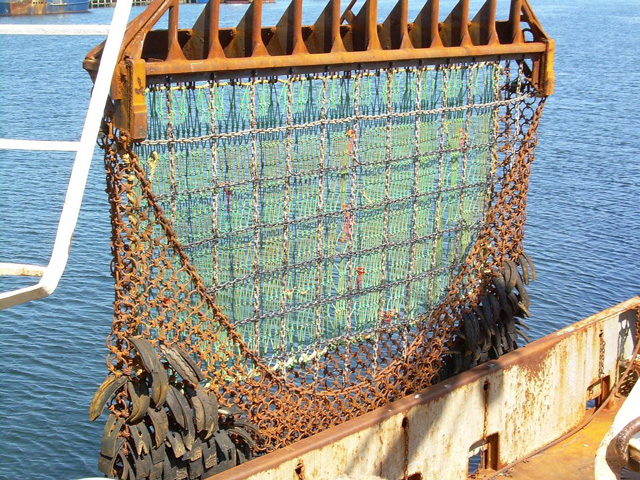
A scallop dredge

In October 2020, the Parliament of the United Kingdom passed the Fisheries Act 2020. It includes a 'permissive extent clause' that would enable the Government of the United Kingdom by an Order in Council to extend the provisions of the Act to cover the Crown Dependencies to bring them into line with the UK's international obligations. This move caused outrage in Jersey as it was seen to be contrary to Jersey's constitutional relationship with the UK. It was reported that the UK intended to cede Jersey's territorial waters as a bargaining chip in order to secure a better deal with the EU. This was denied by the British government.

== Attempts to resolve the dispute ==
During the discussions on the day of the protest, the Government of Jersey committed to setting up a telephone number which the French fishermen could use to speak directly with fluent French-speaking staff in its marine resources team as an addition to the formal diplomatic channels. On 12 May, Girardin called for this to be suspended.

Jersey extended the time that boats over 12 metres (39 ft) had to provide additional evidence of their historic fishing activities in the area until 1 July. However, on 12 May, Girardin wrote to the EU Commissioner Sinkevicius asking for all licences to be renewed until 30 September, without the new requirements that were imposed by Jersey. On 18 May, the Alizé 3 — a 16-metre (52 ft) French fishing boat from Granville — was alleged to have fished in an exclusion area where scientific research was due to take place. Jersey's fisheries protection vessel Norman Le Brocq intercepted the fishing boat whose skipper was adamant that he had permission to fish there. Deputy Guida said that Jersey would be lodging a complaint with the European Commission.

As of 19 June, with two weeks before the 1 July deadline, the Jersey authorities had not received any further data from French boats over 12 metres (39 ft) to evidence the extent that they had historically fished in Jersey's waters.

When questioned by the House of Lords' European Affairs Committee, the Ambassador of the European Union to the United Kingdom João Vale de Almeida said the way to resolve the dispute was to "use the instruments we created, the bodies we set up within the withdrawal agreement, the joint specialised committees within the Trade and Corporation Agreement, a number of committees and working groups" — a governance structure he described as "complex" — rather than unilateral measures.

On 28 June, Jersey media reported that the EU had recently requested a further extension to the transitional arrangements, and Jersey had agreed to do so until the end of September. The 47 larger boats equipped with tracking systems would continue to be able to fish, along with 177 smaller boats that had applied for licences, and the rules about the number of days that the French boats can fish and the gear that they can use would temporarily not apply. This time would enable "constructive discussions" to continue, and more historical catch data to be submitted and analysed during July. In exchange, Jersey sought assurances that the three of its fishing fleet that had requested permits to continue to fish in French waters would be granted them, and that the French would honour the terms of the trade deal by continuing to allow Jersey boats to unload their catch in France. As of 10 September 2021, the UKSIA listed 177 boats under 12 metres (39 ft) that had been authorised to fish under the transitional arrangements until 30 September 2021.

On 6 September, French prime minister Jean Castex wrote to President of the European Commission Ursula von der Leyen that there was a lack of "political will" to resolve the dispute, and called for a consultative body to be established, similar to those in place under the Granville Bay agreement.

On 7 September, Senator Gorst informed the House of Commons Justice Select Committee that the TCA made clear that it was up to Jersey to issue the licences, that there was no automatic transition from the previous treaty, and that the Island's government wanted to work through the technical details and data to respect the historic fishing rights of the French but "no more and no less". While the communication was more positive, Jersey "still did not have all the data" and was pushing all parties for the data via Brussels.

In January 2022, France's Europe Minister Clément Beaune said the French could take legal action, which Jersey's Environment Minister understood to mean they could ask the EU to invoke arbitration mechanisms that are built into the Withdrawal Agreement. As of 9 March 2022, no such complaint had been filed. President Macron had told Brittany and Normandy that they could negotiate directly with Jersey, alongside the formal route between Jersey, the UK, the EU, France and the regions, and the first such meeting had taken place.

The 'nature and extent' part of the licensing agreement that covers which species of fish each boat can catch, where and in what quantity remains under discussion as of December 2022, together with the rules on replacement vessels. Jersey's new Environment Minister, Deputy Jonathan Renouf was seeking approval for a change in the regulations so that there is more flexibility in how similar a replacement fishing boat needs to be to the old one. This would allow for the replacement to be slightly longer or have a bigger engine, for example.

== EU compensation scheme ==
A €60m EU-funded compensation scheme is intended to provide individual support to fishers that failed to be granted a licence, or to enable them to exit the profession.

== See also ==
- 1993 Cherbourg incident
- Cod Wars
- English Channel scallop fishing dispute
- External relations of Jersey
- Fish for finance
- France–United Kingdom relations
- Maritime history of the Channel Islands § Fishing
