= Tony Radakin =

Royal Navy Admiral (born 1965)

Admiral Sir Tony Radakin GBE KCB DL
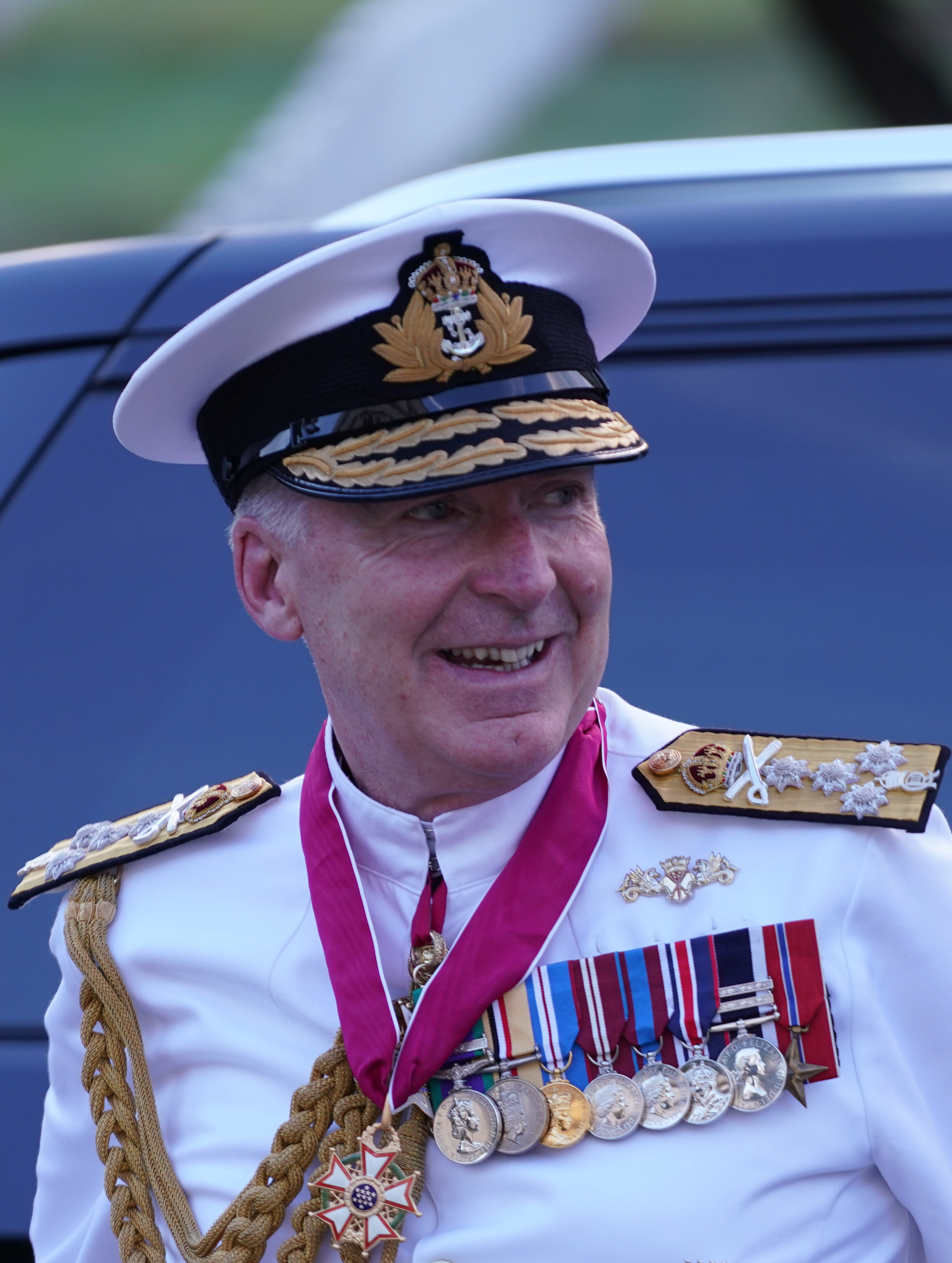
- Admiral Radakin in 2024
- Born: 10 November 1965 (age 60); Oldham, Lancashire, England
- Alma mater: University of Southampton (LLB); King's College London (MA)
- Spouse: Louise Radakin (m. 1995)
- Children: 4
- Military career
- Allegiance: United Kingdom
- Branch: Royal Navy
- Service years: 1990–2025
- Rank: Admiral
- Service number: C032545M
- Commands: Chief of the Defence Staff; First Sea Lord; Commander United Kingdom Maritime Forces; HMNB Portsmouth; Combined Task Force Iraqi Maritime; US/UK Naval Transition Team, Iraq; HMS Norfolk; Southampton URNU; HMS Blazer
- Conflicts: Iraq War
- Awards: Knight Grand Cross of the Order of the British Empire; Knight Commander of the Order of the Bath; Commander of the Legion of Merit (United States); Bronze Star Medal (United States); Badge of Honour of the Bundeswehr (Gold) (Germany)
- Other work: Lord High Constable of England (2023)

Admiral Sir Antony David Radakin, GBE, KCB, DL (born 10 November 1965) is a retired senior Royal Navy officer who served as Chief of the Defence Staff, the professional head of the British Armed Forces, from November 2021 to September 2025.

Radakin was previously the First Sea Lord, the professional head of the Naval Service from June 2019 to November 2021. He was Chief of Staff, Joint Forces Command, from 2016 to 2018, and the Second Sea Lord and Deputy Chief of the Naval Staff from 2018 to 2019. He was appointed Lord High Constable of England in 2023, and in that role took part in the Coronation of Charles III and Camilla.

== Early life and education ==
Radakin was born on 10 November 1965 in Oldham, Greater Manchester, England. He moved to Portishead, Somerset, when he was five years old. He was educated at St Brendan's College, then an all-boys Catholic direct grant grammar school in Bristol.

Radakin studied law at the University of Southampton, graduating with a Bachelor of Laws (LLB) degree in 1989. He was sponsored through university by the Royal Navy.

He continued his legal career alongside his naval service, and qualified as a barrister and was called to the Bar from the Middle Temple in 1996.

He later studied international relations and defence studies at King's College London, completing a Master of Arts (MA) degree in 2000.

== Naval career ==
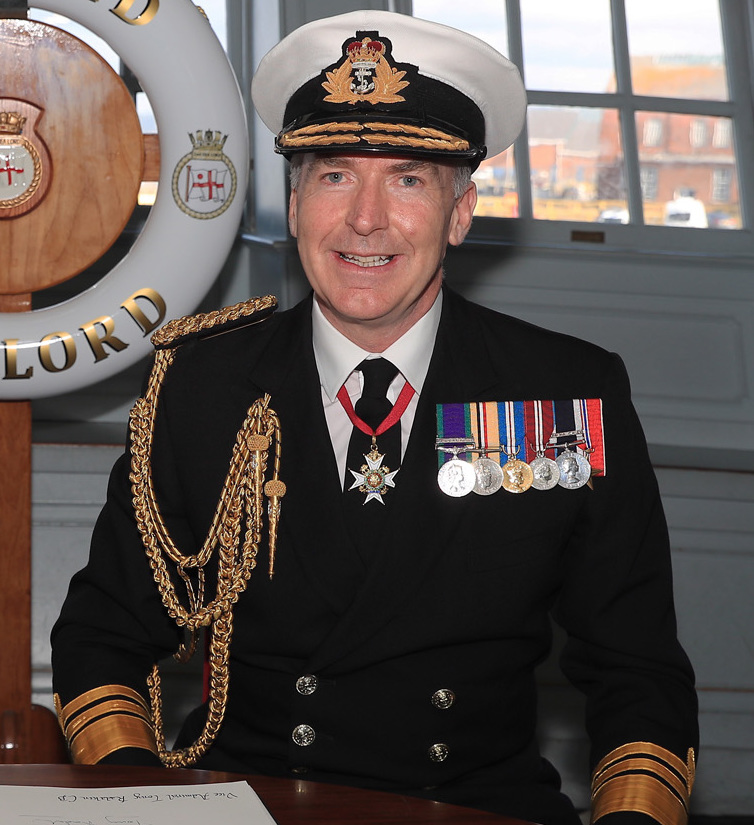
Vice Admiral Radakin as Second Sea Lord

Radakin gained his commission in the Royal Navy on 20 October 1990. After a period watchkeeping on HMS Leeds Castle, he was navigating officer aboard HMS Charybdis and HMS Andromeda (1991–1992). He was commanding officer of HMS Blazer from 1993 to 1995. He was promoted to lieutenant commander on 1 November 1996, and went on to become commanding officer of the frigate HMS Norfolk in 2003, commanding officer of the US/UK Iraqi Naval Transition Team in 2006, and commanding officer of the US/UK Combined Task Force Iraqi Maritime in 2010. For this tour he was awarded the Bronze Star Medal by the President of the United States.

Promoted to commodore on 30 August 2011, Radakin became commander of HMNB Portsmouth in October 2011. He was appointed Director of Force Development at the Ministry of Defence in November 2012. Promoted to rear admiral on 3 December 2014, he became Commander United Kingdom Maritime Forces and Rear Admiral Surface Ships in December 2014, and Chief of Staff, Joint Forces Command, in March 2016.

Promoted to the rank of vice admiral on 27 March 2018 on appointment as Second Sea Lord and Deputy Chief of the Naval Staff, Radakin was appointed a Companion of the Order of the Bath in the 2018 Birthday Honours three months later. He was promoted to admiral and succeeded Admiral Sir Philip Jones as First Sea Lord and Chief of the Naval Staff in June 2019.

In 2019, Radakin initiated a programme of reform across the Royal Navy under the banner of Royal Navy Transformation. The initiative encompassed increasing the UK's operational advantage in the North Atlantic, developing carrier strike operations using the newly constructed aircraft carriers HMS Queen Elizabeth and HMS Prince of Wales, increasing the Royal Navy's forward presence around the world, reforming the Royal Marines into the Future Commando Force and improving the Navy's use of technology and innovation. Controversially, this also included a forty per cent reduction in admirals across the Royal Navy and a forty per cent cut in headquarters staff.

Radakin was appointed Knight Commander of the Order of the Bath (KCB) in the 2021 Birthday Honours.

=== Chief of the Defence Staff ===
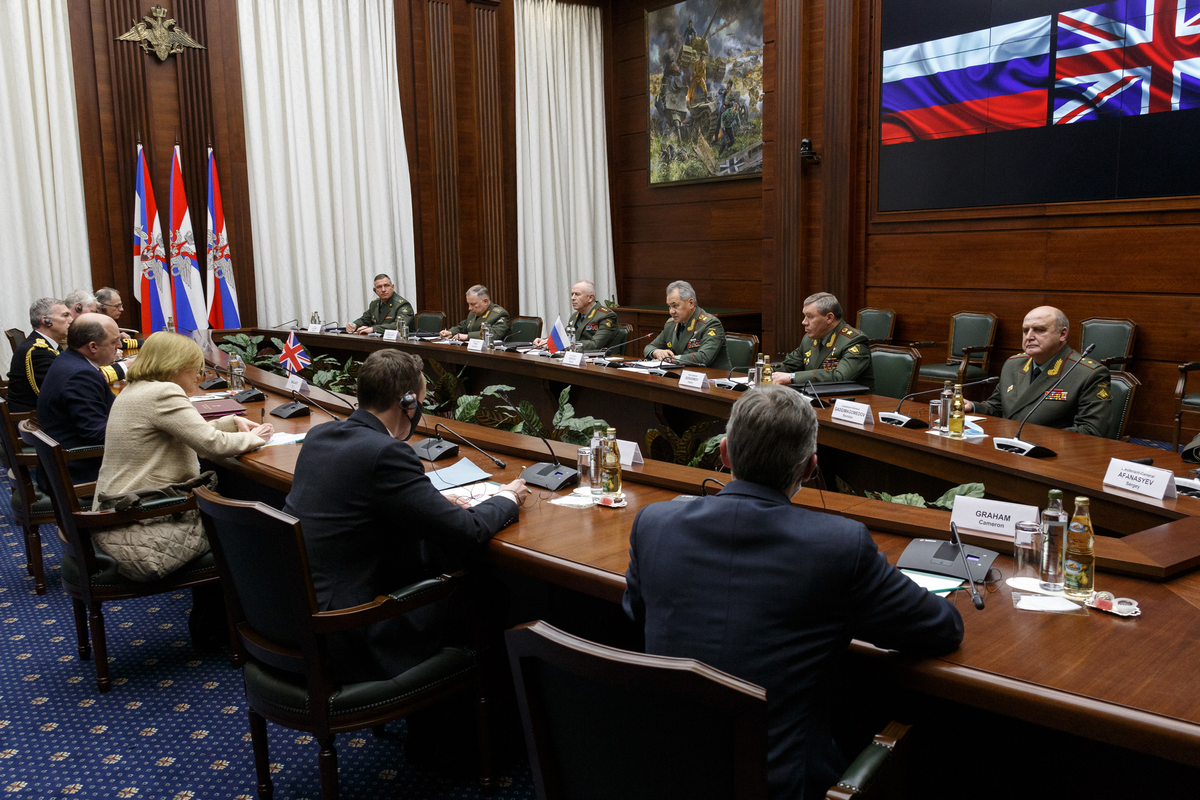
Radakin and UK Defence Secretary Ben Wallace with Russian Defence Minister Sergei Shoigu in Moscow on 11 February 2022

Radakin was appointed Chief of the Defence Staff on 30 November 2021. Prime Minister Boris Johnson appointed Radakin instead of the Ministry of Defence's preferred candidate, General Sir Patrick Sanders, due to Radakin's reputation as a reformer and Johnson's anticipation of future naval conflicts in the Mediterranean and Indo-Pacific regions. Radakin relinquished the position of First Sea Lord to Admiral Sir Ben Key on 8 November 2021.

Radakin made his first Chief of Defence Staff speech to the Royal United Services Institute in December 2021. He stated that the security outlook for the UK was "far more complex and dangerous than at any time over the past 30 years" and that the geopolitical situation was in "a real sense of back to the future, with the return of the State as the central, indispensable feature of the international system." Radakin also said that the UK military was at risk of looking "ridiculous" until it improved diversity and leadership in the armed forces.

Radakin said on 7 January 2022 that the UK faced a number of security challenges from Russia, and that an attempt to damage underwater communication cables could be considered by the UK as an "act of war". However, he also said that the UK and Russia continue to test daily the telephone connection between the UK Ministry of Defence and the Russian Situation centre, which could be used "if urgent talks were needed to de-escalate an incident."

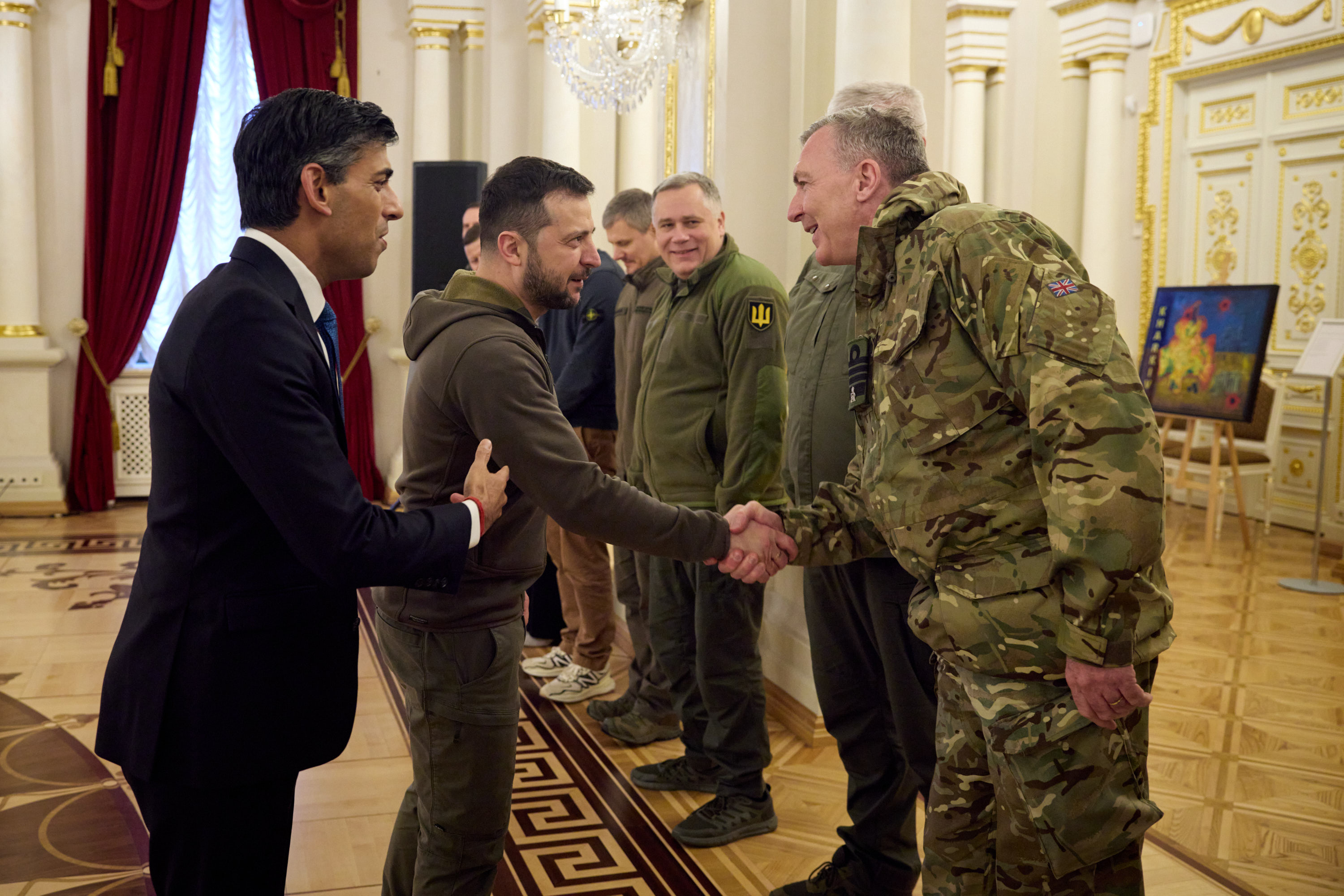
Radakin with Ukrainian President Volodymyr Zelenskyy and UK Prime Minister Rishi Sunak in Kyiv, Ukraine on 19 November 2022

On 11 February 2022, Radakin met with Valery Gerasimov, the Chief of the General Staff of the Russian Armed Forces. Gerasimov denied that Russia was planning to invade Ukraine.

Asked on the BBC's Sunday Morning programme shortly after the 2022 Russian invasion of Ukraine whether Russia taking over Ukraine was inevitable, Radakin said: "No. I think we’ve seen a Russian invasion that is not going well". Later, on 31 March 2022, he said Russian President Vladimir Putin had "already lost" the war in Ukraine due to "catastrophic misjudgments." In June 2022, Radakin answered questions from the House of Lords International Relations and Defence Committee. He said that, following support for Ukraine, replacing the weapons stockpiles of the UK could take "years" to achieve and that it may also be "five to ten years" before the UK was ready to deploy a division with sufficient capabilities to fight with US forces.

In July 2022, he said "As military professionals, we see a relatively stable regime in Russia. President Putin has been able to quash any opposition. We see a hierarchy that is invested in President Putin and so nobody at the top has got the motivation to challenge President Putin. And that is bleak."

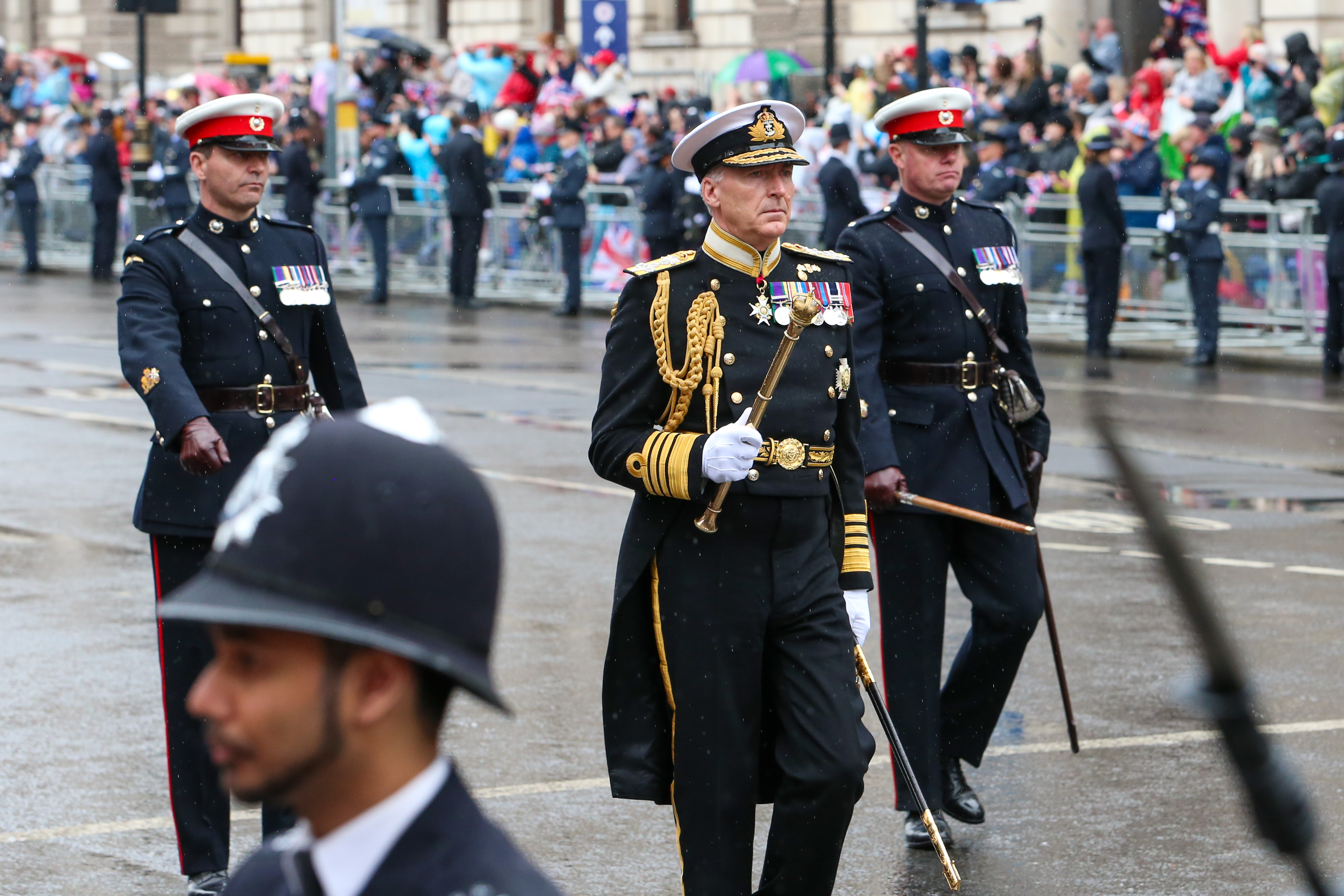
Radakin at the Coronation of Charles III in 2023

In September 2022, Radakin paid tribute to Queen Elizabeth II following her death. He described the relationship between the Queen and the armed forces as "deeply personal" and that the armed forces would perform their final duty to the Queen by participating in her state funeral.

On 19 October 2022, Radakin delivered the annual Lord Mayor of London Defence and Security Lecture in Mansion House, London. He discussed the wider security situation in Europe, focusing on Ukraine and Russia.

In light of the 2022 strikes, Radakin, said it would be "slightly perilous" to expect the UK Armed Forces to be used routinely in the event of strikes by public sector workers. "We're not spare capacity," he said. "We're busy and we're doing lots of things on behalf of the nation. We've got to focus on our primary role."

Radakin served as Lord High Constable of England at the coronation of King Charles III and Queen Camilla in 2023.

In September 2023, Radakin was appointed a Commander of the Legion of Merit by the United States. The honour was presented by General Mark Milley, Chairman of the Joint Chiefs of Staff.

It was announced in February 2024 that Radakin would stay in post as Chief of the Defence Staff until autumn 2025 after proving to be a key player in helping Ukraine in its fight against Russia.

In July 2024 he criticised "historic underinvestment" in the British Armed Forces leading to "deficiencies in people, equipment, stockpiles, training and technology".

On 2 August 2024, Radakin visited Israel and met with Israel's Chief of the General Staff Herzi Halevi to discuss "strategic security issues and cooperation in the region."

In September 2025, Radakin handed over command of the British Armed Forces to Air Chief Marshal Sir Rich Knighton, and on 9 November 2025 he formally retired from the navy.

Radakin was appointed a Knight Grand Cross of the Order of the British Empire (GBE) in the 2026 New Year Honours.

== Later life ==
Radakin was appointed a Deputy Lieutenant of Hampshire in March 2026.

== Personal life ==
In 1995, Radakin married. He lives in Hampshire with his wife, Louise, and their four sons. Radakin is president of the Royal Navy Squash Association and the Armed Forces Tennis Association, and the vice admiral of the Royal Naval Sailing Association.

== Honours and decorations ==

| Ribbon | Description | Notes |
| | Most Excellent Order of the British Empire | Appointed Knight Grand Cross in 2026 |
| | Most Honourable Order of the Bath | Appointed Companion in 2018; Appointed Knight Commander in 2021 |
| | General Service Medal (1962) | With "Gulf" clasp |
| | Iraq Medal | |
| | Queen Elizabeth II Golden Jubilee Medal | 6 February 2002 |
| | Queen Elizabeth II Diamond Jubilee Medal | 6 February 2012 |
| | Queen Elizabeth II Platinum Jubilee Medal | 6 February 2022 |
| | King Charles III Coronation Medal | 6 May 2023 |
| | Naval Long Service and Good Conduct Medal (1848) | With 2 Bars |
| | Commander of the Legion of Merit | Appointed in 2023 |
| | Bronze Star Medal | Awarded in 2010 |

In November 2025, Radakin was awarded the Cross of Honour in Gold of the Badge of Honour of the Bundeswehr 'for special services to the German Armed Forces' by the Inspector General of the Bundeswehr, Carsten Breuer.

Military offices
| Preceded by Robert Tarrant | Commander United Kingdom Maritime Forces; 2014–2016 | Succeeded by Alex Burton |
| Preceded by Jonathan Woodcock | Second Sea Lord and Deputy Chief of the Naval Staff; 2018–2019 | Succeeded by Nick Hine |
| Preceded by Sir Philip Jones | First Sea Lord; 2019–2021 | Succeeded by Sir Ben Key |
| Preceded by Sir Nick Carter | Chief of the Defence Staff; 2021–2025 | Succeeded by Sir Rich Knighton |
Court offices
| Vacant Title last held by The Viscount Alanbrooke | Lord High Constable of England; 2023 | Vacant |
