= 1993 Cherbourg incident =

Series of maritime incidents between the British Royal Navy and French fishermen

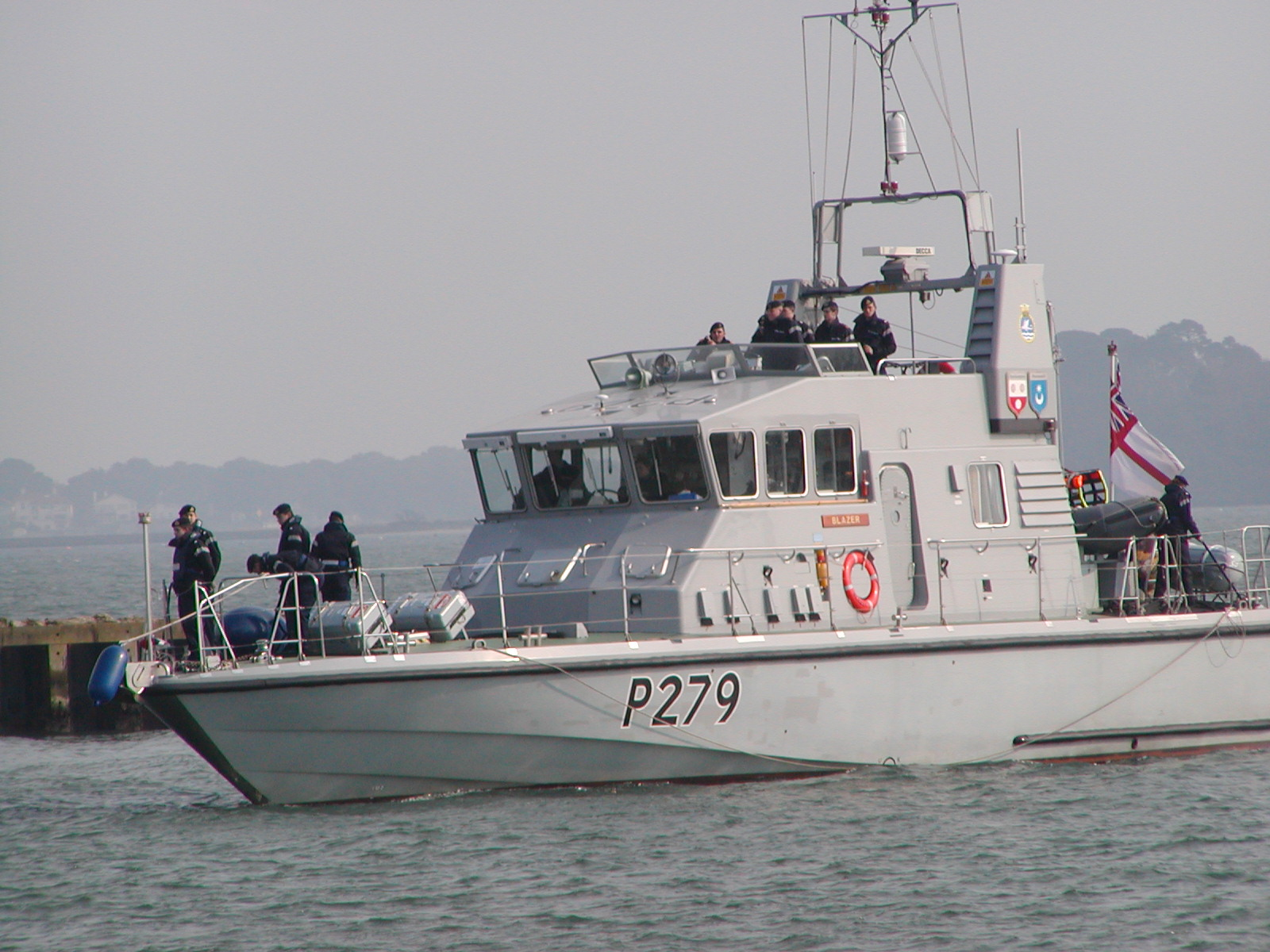
- HMS Blazer, one of the Royal Navy's craft involved
- Date: 26 March – 2 April 1993
- Location: Cherbourg Harbour, France; 49°39′54.70″N 1°40′21.45″W
- Caused by: Fishing rights dispute between Britain and France
- Result: Royal Navy ship boarded, ensign burned French trawler captured, skipper arrested

Parties
(France) French fishermen	Royal Navy
- Location within France

The 1993 Cherbourg incident were a series of maritime incidents which took place from 26 March to 2 April 1993 between the British Royal Navy and French fishermen as a result of a fishing rights dispute in and around the Channel Islands waters.

== Background ==
The tensions around the Channel Islands waters began to rise in September 1992, when the European Union (EU) recognised a six-mile (5.2 nmi; 9.7 km) British limit for exclusive fishing rights around the islands. Until then, British and French trawlers had operated in the zone without restrictions. The agreement left a three-mile (2.6 nmi; 4.8 km) limit from the coastline where only Jersey trawlers could fish, an area between the three-mile and the six-mile limits for any British-flagged boat, and an outer zone between the six-mile and the 12-mile (10 nmi; 19 km) limits, where only British and French fishing boats could operate.

== The incidents ==
The first incident took place on 26 March, when two fishing inspectors from the Channel Islands were illegally taken on the trawler Impatiens to the French port of Barneville-Carteret, after the French fishing boat was challenged by the British fishery vessel HMS Orkney from Guernsey, which confiscated her pots. The inspectors were rescued some hours later by a French coastguard vessel. On 28 March 1993, HMS Blazer was paying a visit to Cherbourg Harbour when the local fishermen learned that a boat from their fleet, La Calypso, had been stopped at sea by a British minesweeper, HMS Brocklesby. The captain of La Calypso refused to submit and set out for Cherbourg with three British fishery protection servicemen on board. A French port vessel later returned the personnel to Royal Navy control.

Eight French trawlers subsequently surrounded the Blazer at 3:00 pm and angry fishermen boarded the ship. According to witnesses, HMS Blazer was seized while manoeuvring outside the port and sailed to Cherbourg harbour by the intruders. Her crew of 16 were forced to remain below the deck for three hours, while the ship's White Ensign was burned. French authorities subsequently put an end to the situation and forcibly expelled the fishermen from Blazer and placed them under arrest. The French Navy, meanwhile, dispatched the patrol boat Coriander to Cherbourg.

On 29 March a flotilla of 36 French trawlers steamed up to Saint Peter Port in Guernsey, where a preliminary deal was agreed. After the first incidents, the Royal Navy deployed unarmed Royal Marines to conduct any future similar law enforcement operations. The marines were from 40 Commando, based at Taunton in Somerset. La Calypso was eventually caught by the fishery vessel HMS Jersey and her master was put under arrest in Guernsey on 2 April 1993. The skipper, Michel Mesnage, was released on bail on 3 April. A new incident took place on 30 June 1993, when the Guernsey-based trawler Sara P was seized by the French Navy, and had her pots confiscated.

== British and French reactions ==
A spokeswoman for the French fishermen accused the Royal Navy of "severe provocation", while the British minister of Agriculture, John Gummer, stated that "The rule of law must be upheld. I have always emphasised the need for fisheries regulations to be properly enforced throughout the EC. The regulations are there to conserve fish and the long-term interests of the fishermen themselves." The British Fisheries junior Minister, David Curry, claimed that the conflict was caused by the French authorities' failure to properly inform their fishermen about the agreement sanctioned by the EU in 1992, and the French legislative election, which in practice left no French government to deal with at the time of the incidents. The British Agriculture Minister had met his elected French counterpart on 1 April, and they had agreed that the 1992 EU decision should be enforced. The French government condemned the fishermen's actions. British and Cherbourg fishermen signed an informal agreement on 5 April, on the first day since the beginning of the crisis, that boats from England and the islands were allowed to unload their catch in France.

A definitive agreement regarding fishing around the Channel Islands and the Cotentin peninsula and Brittany was reached after an exchange of notes in Paris, on 16 August 1994.

== See also ==
- 2021 Jersey dispute
- Cod Wars
- English Channel scallop fishing dispute
- Exclusive economic zone
- International waters
- Lobster War
- Overfishing
- R (Factortame Ltd) v Secretary of State for Transport
- Turbot War
