= French patrol vessel Athos =

Patrol vessel of the French Navy

Class overview
- Builders: Chantier naval de l'Esterel, Cannes
- Operators: Marine Nationale (until 2016); Maritime Gendarmerie (since 2016)
- Built: 1978 – 20 November 1979
- In commission: 1980 – 8 December 2022

History

France
- Name: Athos
- Operator: French Navy (until 2016); Maritime Gendarmerie (since 2016)
- Builder: Chantier naval de l'Esterel, Cannes
- Laid down: 1978
- Launched: 20 November 1979
- Commissioned: 14 March 1980
- Decommissioned: 8 December 2022
- Identification: Pennant number A712

General characteristics
- Class & type: Patrol boat
- Displacement: 100 t (98 long tons) (full load)
- Length: 32.1 m (105 ft 4 in)
- Beam: 6.45 m (21 ft 2 in)
- Draft: 1.9 m (6 ft 3 in)
- Installed power: Electrical:
- Propulsion: Engines : 2 diesel, 2,250 hp (1,680 kW)
- Speed: 20 knots (37 km/h; 23 mph)
- Endurance: 25 hours at 28 knots (52 km/h; 32 mph); 48 hours at 18 knots (33 km/h; 21 mph)
- Complement: 13 core crew
- Sensors & processing systems: Navigation radar Racal-Decca; Furuno deep sea depth sounder; HF, UHF and VHF radio means, IFF answering machine
- Armament: 1 Browning M2 12.7 mm machine gun

Athos was a patrol vessel that was originally built for the French Navy. The pair of patrol vessels, Athos and Aramis, were sponsored by the commune of Auch in Gers until 2012. The commune of Saint-Martin-Sainte-Catherine in Creuse, has been the sponsor since 23 February 2013. Athos was transferred to the Maritime Gendarmerie at the beginning of 2016. The only French Navy vessel to be entirely made of beech wood, her hull was capable of withstanding M5 model 4 style torpedoes.

== History ==
The two boats were ordered for the support of the Centre d'Essais des Landes (C.E.L.). They joined the star division of the Adour, created on 14 March 1980, date of the admission to active service of Athos.

=== Service ===
The two boats were installed at the Bayonne naval base. This division, dissolved in 1993, took the name of Site Surveillance Patroller (PSS) in 1995. Their main mission is the surveillance of the shooting range, the positioning of the targets and their recovery and the support to the divers of the Center of Test of Missile Launch (CELM). Their secondary mission consists of maritime surveillance of the Bay of Biscay for the fisheries police, assistance operations and pollution control.

Athos joined the port of Cherbourg-Octeville in 2016. She supervises the Channel and the North Sea along with Aramis, while being assigned to the Maritime Gendarmerie.

During the 2021 Jersey dispute, France sent two of its own patrol boats, Athos and Thémis to Jersey on 6 May 2021 at around 13:30 BST. This was part of a chain of events sparked by a new fishing licence scheme, unilaterally introduced by the Jersey authorities in alleged contravention of an agreement between the UK and the EU nations containing conditions that had not been discussed with the French authorities. Athos was decommissioned, together with her sister boat Aramis, on 8 December 2022. Both vessels were replaced by new Maroni-class patrol boats.
