= French patrol vessel Thémis =

Patrol vessel of the French Navy

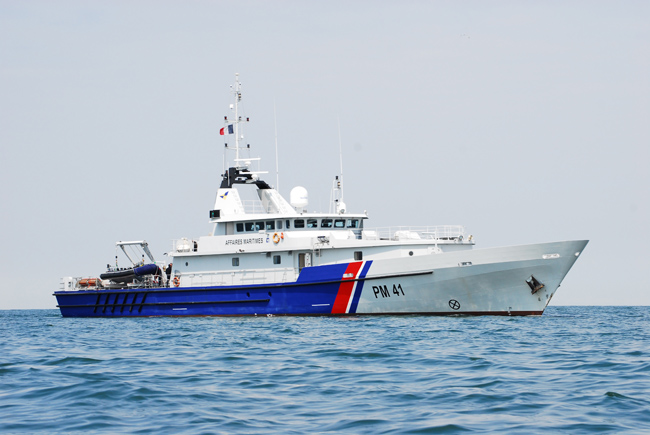

Class overview
- Builders: Constructions Mécaniques de Normandie
- Operators: Directorate of Maritime Affairs
- Built: 13 May 2003 – 5 April 2004
- In commission: 2004 – present

History

France
- Name: Thémis
- Operator: Directorate of Maritime Affairs
- Builder: Constructions Mécaniques de Normandie
- Laid down: 13 May 2003
- Launched: 5 April 2004
- Commissioned: 7 May 2004
- Identification: Pennant number PM41

General characteristics
- Class & type: Patrol boat
- Displacement: 409 t (403 long tons)
- Length: 52.5 m (172 ft 3 in)
- Beam: 9 m (29 ft 6 in)
- Draft: 2.43 m (8 ft 0 in)
- Propulsion: 6,310 hp (4,710 kW)
- Speed: 21 knots (39 km/h; 24 mph)
- Complement: 17 core crew
- Armament: 1 Browning M2 12.7 mm (0.50 in) machine gun (not mounted)

Thémis (PM 41) is a fast patrol vessel of the Directorate of Maritime Affairs based at the Cherbourg Naval Base.

== History ==
=== Service ===
Thémis carries out fishing control and marine environment protection operations in the Exclusive economic zone of France of the Eastern Channel - North Sea maritime zone. She carries out checks to prevent pollution due to exploration or exploitation operations of the seabed or subsoil. It bears the AEM (State Action at Sea, French: Action de l'État en mer) marking on its bow, the three inclined blue, white and red bands.

On 6 May 2021, France sent two of its own patrol boats, Athos and Thémis to Jersey at around 13:30 BST to ensure "the safety of navigation and the safeguard of human life at sea" in conjunction with the two British naval patrol boats; HMS Severn and HMS Tamar. Present were approximately fifty French fishing boats that came to demonstrate off the British Crown dependency of Jersey against the new fishing licensing conditions imposed by the Government of Jersey in its territorial waters.

== See also ==
- 2021 Jersey dispute
