= English Channel scallop fishing dispute =

Dispute between French and British fishers

- Date: 10 October 2012 or 8 October 2012; 28 August 2018; 13 October 2020
- Location: 15 nautical miles (28 km) off the coast of Le Havre, France.
- Caused by: Different fishing restrictions on British and French scallop fishing. French fishermen claim the British boats were within the 12-nautical-mile (22 km) fishing exclusion zone around the coast.
- Goals: To prevent British fishermen fishing for scallops.

Parties
British scallop fishermen	French scallop fishermen

Number
5 trawlers	40 boats

Casualties and losses
3 trawlers damaged	2 boats damaged

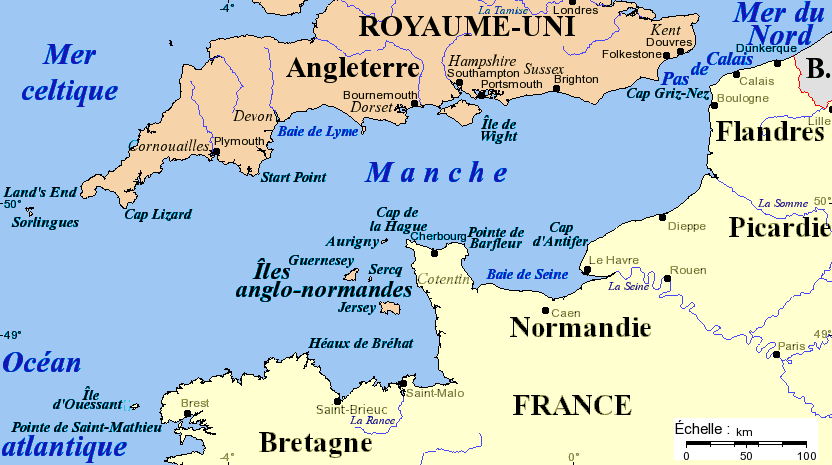
Channel map with main capes, islands and cities. Mercator projection, 2005 data

The English Channel scallop fishing dispute, also called the Great Scallop War or guerre de la coquille, occurred on 10 October 2012 or 8 October 2012, between British and French fishermen in the Channel 24 kilometres (15 mi) off the coast of Le Havre, France. The dispute arose because of a difference in fishing restrictions between the two countries. British scallop fishers are allowed to fish for scallops year round, whilst French scallop fishers are not permitted to fish between 15 May and 1 October each year. Other confrontations took place in the same area on 28 August 2018 and 13 October 2020.

== 2012 ==
Approximately 20 French fishing boats surrounded five British fishing boats and, according to the British fishermen, tried to ram the British boats, throwing rocks and nets and attempting to damage their propellers and engines. French fishermen claim their actions were in response to the British boats being inside the European Union's Common Fisheries Policy 19 kilometres (12 mi) fishing exclusion zone; British fishermen deny that they were within the exclusion zone.

The British Marine Management Organisation informed French authorities; the French Navy intervened and a meeting took place between the French and British fishermen to resolve the dispute.

== 2018 ==
On 28 August, 35 French fishing boats tried to prevent several British fishing vessels from catching sea scallops off the Normandy coast. Violence began when three large British trawlers were chased by the French fishing boats. British trawlers Golden Promise and Joanna C were damaged after being rammed and hit by stones, metal shackles, petrol bombs and rocket flares, and were eventually forced to seek shelter at Brixham. Scottish dredger Honeybourne III attempted to ram a number of French boats after a fire erupted on board; three French vessels were also damaged. The Scottish trawler eventually docked at Shoreham. The violence was condemned by both British and French officials. Talks started on 5 September but by 12 September had failed to conclude, owing to British and French intransigence. The French Navy vowed to intervene in the event of future clashes.

Subsequently, a "crab war" developed in which the British claimed that the French fishermen deliberately damaged their crab pots. This violence was also condemned by both British and French officials.

== 2020 ==
Further incidents occurred in 2020. On 13 October two British boats, Golden Promise and Girl Macey, based in Brixham, were in the Baie de Seine, near the 12-mile French territorial limit. One of the boats was surrounded by five French boats, the other by fifteen. Flares, oil and frying pans were thrown at the British boats by the French. The French boats also jammed frequencies used by the British trawlers.

== See also ==
- 1993 Cherbourg incident
- Cod Wars
- Lobster War
- Turbot War
- Peanut Hole
