= HMS Blazer (P279) =

Archer-class patrol vessel of the Royal Navy

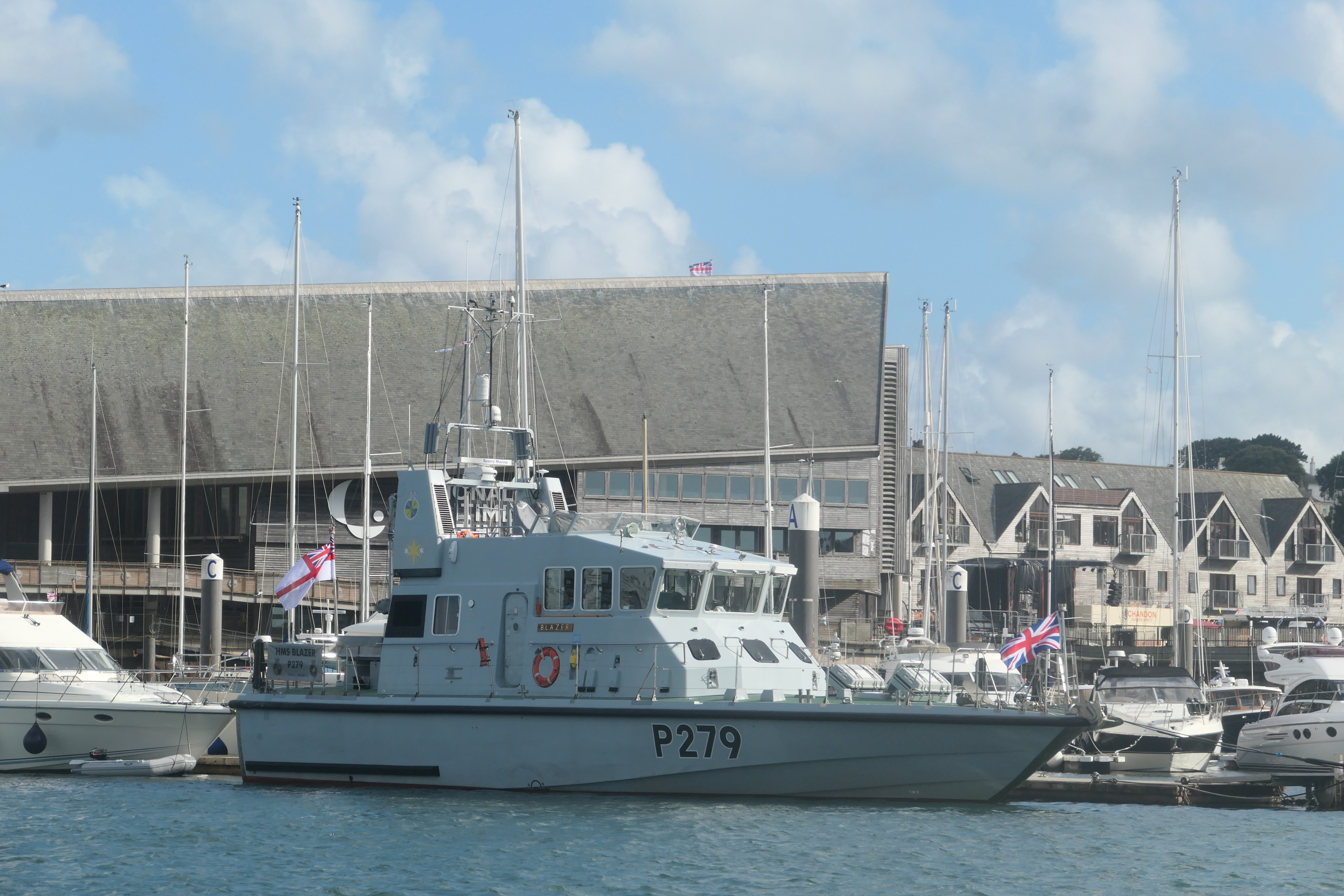
- HMS Blazer at Falmouth, 2023

History

United Kingdom
- Name: HMS Blazer
- Operator: Royal Navy
- Builder: Vosper Thornycroft
- Commissioned: 1988
- Identification: MMSI number: 235009870; Callsign: GAAU
- Motto: "Premier in the First"
- Status: In active service

General characteristics
- Class & type: Archer-class patrol vessel
- Displacement: 54 tonnes
- Length: 20.8 m (68 ft 3 in)
- Beam: 5.8 m (19 ft 0 in)
- Draught: 1.8 m (5 ft 11 in)
- Propulsion: 2 shafts, Rolls-Royce M800T diesels, 1,590 bhp (1,190 kW)
- Speed: 24 kn (44 km/h); 45 kn (83 km/h) (Hull design, but limited due to engine fitted)
- Range: 550 nmi (1,020 km)
- Complement: 16 (training) (Note: 5 ship's company, 1 training officer, 10 URNU students.); 12 (operational)
- Sensors & processing systems: Decca 1216 navigation radar
- Armament: 1 × Oerlikon 20 mm cannon on fo'c'sle ("for but not with"); 3 × General purpose machine guns (Note: When operational and not in URNU role.)

HMS Blazer is an Archer-class patrol vessel of the Royal Navy. She was built by Vosper Thornycroft. She is 20.8 metres (68 ft 3 in) long and 5.8 metres (19 ft 0 in) wide and powered by two Rolls-Royce diesel engines. The ship is based at HMNB Devonport, the shore base in Plymouth and was commissioned in 1988.

Blazer carries a crew of four, plus a commanding officer. A training officer accompanies up to 10 students when Blazer is operating in its URNU capacity. The ship is affiliated to both the Southampton University Royal Naval Unit (SURNU) and Portsmouth University Royal Naval Unit.

Tasking includes: officer cadet training with Britannia Royal Naval College; VVIP visits and security patrols.

On 29 March 1993 Blazer was involved in a fishing incident with French trawlers at the port of Cherbourg. According to witnesses, Blazer was seized by French fisherman while manoeuvring outside the port and sailed to Cherbourg harbour. Her crew of 16 were forced to remain below the deck for three hours, while the ship's White Ensign was burned. French authorities subsequently put an end to the situation and forcibly expelled the fishermen from Blazer and placed them under arrest. The French Navy, meanwhile, dispatched the patrol boat Coriander to Cherbourg to restore order.

In the early 2020s, Blazer, along with other Archer-class vessels, was given a more operational role as part of the reconstituted Coastal Forces Squadron. In early 2024, Blazer and three of her sister ships deployed to northern Norway as part of the NATO exercise "Steadfast Defender".
